= 1979 Scottish National Party leadership election =

Scottish National Party (SNP) leadership election

- 15 September 1979
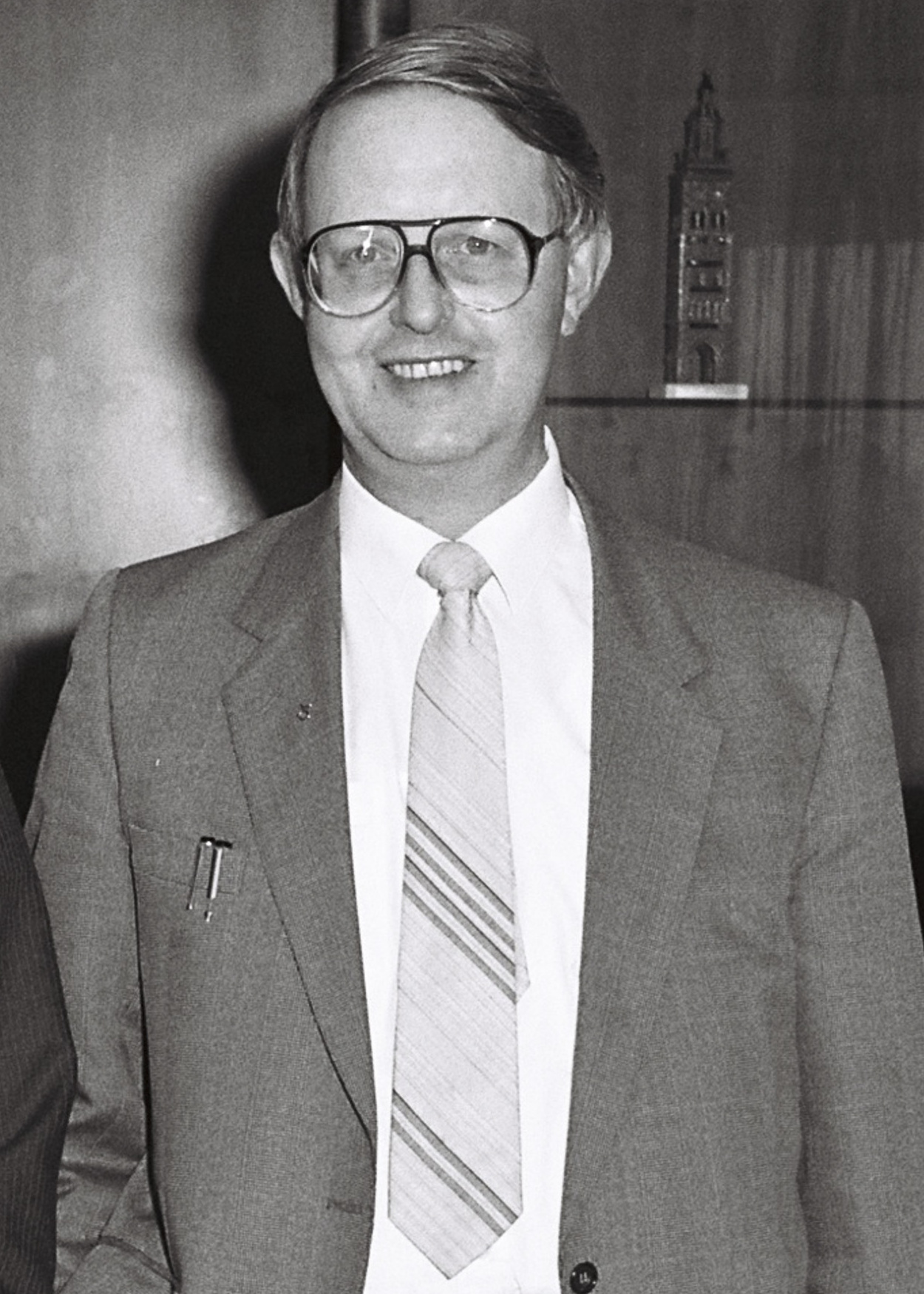

Candidate	Gordon Wilson	Stephen Maxwell	Willie McRae
Popular vote	530	117	52
Percentage	75.8%	16.7%	7.4%
Leader before election
William Wolfe
Elected Leader
Gordon Wilson

There was an election to choose a new leader of the Scottish National Party (SNP) held in 1979. The election saw Gordon Wilson become the party's new national convenor.

William Wolfe had been the leader of the SNP since winning a leadership election in 1969, and initially the party had performed well under his leadership. In 1978, he announced that he intended to stand down the following year and, as a result, he had little involvement with the party's campaign in the 1979 United Kingdom general election. The election went very badly for the SNP, which lost nine of its eleven seats in Parliament.

Immediately after the election, a group of left-wingers in the party, including Roseanna Cunningham and Margo MacDonald, formed what became the 79 Group. In response, those who wished to prioritise independence over all other considerations formed the Campaign for Nationalism in Scotland. Both groups put forward candidates for election to various posts in the election held at that year's conference, held in Dundee.

The most significant election at the conference was that for party leader. Three candidates stood to replace Wolfe:

- Stephen Maxwell, Vice Chair (Publicity), chair of the unsuccessful SNP campaign in the 1979 Scottish devolution referendum, and a leading figure in the 79 Group.
- Willie McRae, Vice Chair (Administration), solicitor and unsuccessful SNP candidate for Ross and Cromarty in the general election.
- Gordon Wilson, Member of Parliament for Dundee East, former leader of the SNP Parliamentary group and spokesperson on oil and energy.

Wilson easily won the election, with 530 votes. Maxwell took 117 votes, and MacRae only 52. The 79 Group failed to win any of the elections at the conference.
