= Golden Treasury of Scottish Poetry =

The Golden Treasury of Scottish Poetry was edited by Hugh MacDiarmid, and published in 1940. From the introduction:

The difference … between this anthology and all previous anthologies of Scottish poetry — is that some little effort has been made to present an "all-in view" of Scottish poetry and in particular to give some little representation to its Gaelic and Latin elements.

It contained a number of ballads, and other anonymous verse; and translations from Latin and Gaelic. George Buchanan's 'Quam misera sit conditio docentium literas humaniores Lutetiae' was translated into English by George Elder Davie. Sorley MacLean translated seven Gaelic poems into English for the anthology, including Alexander MacDonald's Birlinn Chloinne Raghnaill (The Birlinn of Clanranald). MacDiarmid's introduction makes the case for Lallans as a poetic language, contra Edwin Muir.

The book was given a positive review in 1941 by Louis Macneice, who ranked it with the Golden Treasury of Irish Verse, by Lennox Robinson.

== Poets included in The Golden Treasury of Scottish Poetry ==
Douglas Ainslie - Marion Angus - John Barbour - Patrick Birnie - Mark Alexander Boyd - Dugald Buchanan - George Buchanan - Robert Burns - Thomas Campbell - Helen B. Cruickshank - John Davidson - Gavin Douglas - William Drummond of Hawthornden - William Dunbar - Jean Elliot - Robert Fergusson - William Fowler - Robert Graham of Gartmore - Alexander Gray - Henry the Minstrel - Robert Henryson - James Hogg - Violet Jacob - James I of Scotland - Arthur Johnstone - Andrew Lang - Lady Anne Lindsay - William Livingston (poet) (Uilleam Macdhunleibhe) - Iain Lom - Sir David Lyndsay - Hugh Macdiarmid - Alasdair mac Mhaighstir Alasdair - Ronald Campbell Macfie - James Pittendrigh Macgillivray - Duncan Ban MacIntyre - A. D. Mackie - Alexander Mair - Sir Richard Maitland - Alexander Montgomerie - James Graham, Marquis of Montrose - Charles Murray - Will H. Ogilvie - David Rorie - William Ross - Alexander Scott - Sir Walter Scott - Donald Sinclair - John Skinner - Alexander Smith - William Soutar - Robert Louis Stevenson - Muriel Stuart - Rachel Annand Taylor - James Thomson (B.V.)

== See also ==
- Scottish literature
- Scottish Renaissance
- 1940 in poetry
- 1940 in literature
- English poetry
- List of poetry anthologies
