= Stephen Maxwell =

Scottish nationalist politician and intellectual

Stephen Maxwell (11 October 1942 – 24 April 2012) was a Scottish nationalist politician and intellectual and, from the 1980s, a leading figure in the Scottish voluntary sector.

== Early life ==
Born in 1942 in Edinburgh to a Scottish medical family, he was brought up in Yorkshire, England, where his father, John, accepted a job as a surgeon on return from service in India during the Second World War. Maxwell was educated at Pocklington School, Yorkshire, and at 17 won a scholarship to study Moral Sciences at St John's College, Cambridge. After graduating from Cambridge he made an unsuccessful attempt to move into journalism before going on to study for an MA in International Relations at the London School of Economics. On completion of the MA (for which he was awarded a distinction) he spent two years working on a PhD thesis on the irrationality of nuclear deterrence, also at the LSE.

== Life ==
In the late 1960s he abandoned academia in England and returned to Scotland, where he balanced his work at the University of Edinburgh with campaigning for the Scottish National Party (SNP). In 1973, at the age of 31, he was appointed Head of Press for the SNP. His friend Owen Dudley Edwards, an Irish-born Edinburgh historian, remembers his press briefings as unique: "Hostile journalists were staggered to hear him explain that their objections to this or that in the party were not really rewarding subjects but that a more useful question to raise would be this other."

During the 1970s Maxwell played a formative role in developing the SNP's industrial and defence policies and became known as one of the most radical and articulate figures in the party. In 1979 he directed the SNP's campaign for a Yes vote in the referendum on Scottish devolution. The campaign was ultimately unsuccessful and heralded the start of a period of decline in the SNP's fortunes.

In 1979 Maxwell, together with Margo MacDonald, Owen Dudley Edwards and a number of younger nationalist activists (including Alex Salmond and Kenny MacAskill) established the 79 Group, a left-wing faction within the SNP. Maxwell stood as the group's candidate in the 1979 Scottish National Party leadership election, taking a distant second place. In 1981 Maxwell wrote and published a pamphlet, The Case for Left-Wing Nationalism, which became the 79 Group's defining statement. Later that year, the 79 Group was expelled by the party leadership, partly because of its alleged affiliations to Irish republicanism.

Throughout the 1980s Maxwell wrote extensively for periodicals, including The Bulletin of Scottish Politics, Cencrastus and Radical Scotland. Following a second failed attempt to move into journalism, he became involved with the Scottish Council of Voluntary Organisations (SCVO).

He worked for the SCVO until he retired from his post as Associate Director in 2009. Between 2010 and his death in April 2012 he chaired the Scottish Urban Regeneration Forum and worked on a book, Arguing for Independence: Evidence, Risk and the Wicked Issues, which examines six cases for Scottish independence: the democratic, the economic, the social, the international, the cultural and the environmental. It was published in September 2012.

Upon his hearing of Maxwell's death, Scottish First Minister and SNP leader Alex Salmond said, "During Stephen’s long career he made an immense contribution to the national movement in Scotland, and was a key figure in the development of the modern SNP. But Stephen’s loss will be felt much more widely than just politics. Over a quarter of a century with the Scottish Council for Voluntary Organisations, Stephen was a tireless campaigner for the third sector in Scotland, helping it through the difficult days of the 1980s and establishing it as a major force in post-devolution Scotland. Above all, I will remember Stephen’s courtesy to all, his extraordinary intellect combined with gentle persuasiveness, and his lifelong service to others."

== Death ==
He died on 24 April 2012, aged 69. He is survived by his wife Sally, his children Luke, Katie and Jamie and his brother Peter.

== Bibliography ==
- Beyond Democracy, in Kennedy, Gavin (ed.) (1976), The Radical Approach, Palingenesis Press, Edinburgh, ISBN 0-905470-00-1
- Politics, in Carty, Tony & McCall Smith, Alexander (eds.) (1978), Power and Manoeuvrability, Q Press, Edinburgh, pp. 1 – 38 ISBN 0-905470-04-4
- Scotland in the British Crisis, in The Bulletin of Scottish Politics No. 1, Autumn 1980, pp. 62 – 68
- Encounter with the Third World, in Cencrastus No. 4, Winter 1980 - 81, ISSN 0264-0856
- The Case for Left-Wing Nationalism, SNP 79 Group Paper No. 6 (1981)
- Le Pouvoir Intellectuel, review of Teachers, Writers and Celebrities: The Intellectuals of Modern France by Régis Debray, in Murray, Glen (ed.) (1981), Cencrastus No. 7, Winter 1981-82, pp. 41 – 42, ISSN 0264-0856
- Scotland, Multinationals and the Third World, Mainstream Publishing, Edinburgh (1982), ISBN 9780906391280
- Radicalism without Ideology?, in 79 Group News, August 1982, p. 7
- review of Hugh Miller: Outrage and Order by George Rosie, in Hearn, Sheila G. (ed.), Cencrastus No. 10, Autumn 1982, pp. 41 & 42, ISSN 0264-0856
- Scotland's Cruel Paradox, in Dunion, Kevin (ed.), Radical Scotland, February/March 1983, pp. 12 – 14, ISSN 0262-6993
- Edinburgh University and the Community, in Lindsay, Maurice (ed.), The Scottish Review: Arts and Environment 31, August 1983, pp. 19 – 26, ISSN 0140-0894
- Scottish Universities, in Dunion, Kevin (ed.), Radical Scotland, February/March 1984, pp. 12 & 13
- The Fall and Fall of Toryism in Scotland, in Lawson, Alan (ed.), Radical Scotland, July 1985, pp. 7 – 9
- review of The Crisis of the Democratic Intellect by George Elder Davie, in Lawson, Alan (ed.), Radical Scotland, Oct/Nov 1986, pp. 16 & 17
- Norway's Economic Lessons for Scotland, in Lawson, Alan (ed.), Radical Scotland, Feb/Mar 1987, pp. 14 – 17
- Scotland in a Wider Europe, in Lawson, Alan (ed.), Radical Scotland, Aug/Sep 1989, pp. 24 – 26
- Scotland International, in Ross, Raymond J. (ed), Cencrastus No. 35, Winter 1989, pp. 15 – 18, ISSN 0264-0856
- The Scottish Middle Class and the National Debate, in Gallagher, Tom (ed.) (1991), Nationalism in the Nineties, Polygon, Edinburgh, pp. 126 – 151, ISBN 0-7486-6098-4
- with Harvie, Christopher, The Political Impact of North Sea Oil in Smout, T.C. (ed.) (1992), Scotland and the Sea, John Donald, Edinburgh, ISBN 9780859763387
- Arguing for Independence, Luath Press, Edinburgh (2012), ISBN 1-908373-33-4
- The Case for Left-Wing Nationalism, Luath Press, Edinburgh (2013), ISBN 9781908373878

== Reviews ==
- Carty, Tony (1982), review of Scotland and the Multinationals, in Hearn, Sheila G. (ed.), Cencrastus No. 10, Autumn 1982, p. 44, ISSN 0264-0856

Party political offices
Preceded by Janette Jones	Scottish National Party Vice Chair (Publicity); 1977–1979?	Succeeded by Colin Bell
Preceded by Gordon Murray	Scottish National Party Vice-President (Local Government); 1981–1982	Succeeded by Janette Jones?
