= The Democratic Intellect =

1961 book by George Elder Davie

- First edition
- Author: George Elder Davie
- Genre: Philosophy
- Publisher: Edinburgh University Press
- Publication date: 1961
- Media type: Print

The Democratic Intellect: Scotland and her Universities in the Nineteenth Century is a 1961 book by philosopher George Elder Davie.
