= 1990 Scottish National Party leadership election =

Scottish National Party (SNP) leadership election

- 22 September 1990
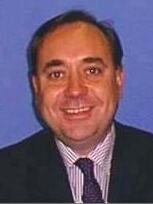

Candidate	Alex Salmond	Margaret Ewing
Popular vote	486	186
Percentage	72.3%	27.7%
Leader before election
Gordon Wilson
Elected Leader
Alex Salmond

There was a Scottish National Party leadership election to choose the new leader of the Scottish National Party (SNP) in 1990. The election followed the announcement by SNP Leader Gordon Wilson, that he would not seek re-nomination as party leader.

Two candidates presented themselves for election. Alex Salmond, the party's depute leader and Member of Parliament for Banff and Buchan, and Margaret Ewing, MP for Moray, who had served as depute leader until 1987. Both candidates were seen as being on the left wing of the party.

Jim Sillars, the party's other Westminster MP, supported Ewing. Although Ewing's official campaign remained positive, Silllars created an unofficial group of Ewing supporters who were highly critical of Salmond.

The result of the election was announced at the party conference, held in Perth on 22 September. Salmond won the election by 486 votes to 186, a larger-than-expected margin.
