= Ronald Campbell Macfie =

Scottish medical doctor (1867–1931)

Ronald Campbell Macfie (1867–1931) was a Scottish medical doctor, poet and science writer specialising in eugenics and evolution. Macfie was a critic of Darwinism and developed his own non-Darwinian evolution theory which was a form of neovitalism. He believed that chance played no role in evolution and that evolution was directed. Macfie was also a panpsychist as he believed mind was to be found in all matter.

== Biography ==
He was a Scottish physician and writer. He had qualified in medicine in Aberdeen in 1897 and specialised in the treatment of tuberculosis.

He was also a Liberal Member of British Parliament mentioned in The Bookman Treasury of Living Poets (4th edition 1931) as a contributor to such works as Fairy Tales for Old and Young (1909), and The Golden Treasury of Scottish Poetry (1940). Among his works are "Man’s Record in the Rocks" (My Magazine, May 1921) The Art of Keeping Well Cassell & Co. 1918/The Vegetarian Society and Evolutionary Consequences of War (cited below).

Campbell Macfie suggested that male war deaths (during World War I) would create a surplus of fertile women, thus reducing the overall birthrate whilst the surviving men would select partners from a wide range of 'surplus' females according to eugenically (sexually) attractive characteristics. He averred that:

Nature has wisely arranged that men should be attracted (to women) by characteristics that imply a superior capacity for motherhood... (thus)...every war will do something to set up evolutionary tendencies opposite to its own, brutal, truculent, anti-social spirit.

== Books published ==
- The Romance of Medicine (1907)
- Air and Health (1909)
- Science, Matter, and Immortality (1909)
- The Titanic: (An Ode of Immortality) (1912)
- Heredity, Evolution, and Vitalism (1912)
- The Romance of the Human Body (1919)
- War: an Ode and Other Poems (1920)
- Sunshine and Health (1927)
- The Faiths and Heresies of a Poet and Scientist (1932)
- The Theology of Evolution (1933)

== See also ==
- Lady Margaret Sackville
- Baby Boom
- Flora Thompson
