= George Elder Davie =

Scottish philosopher

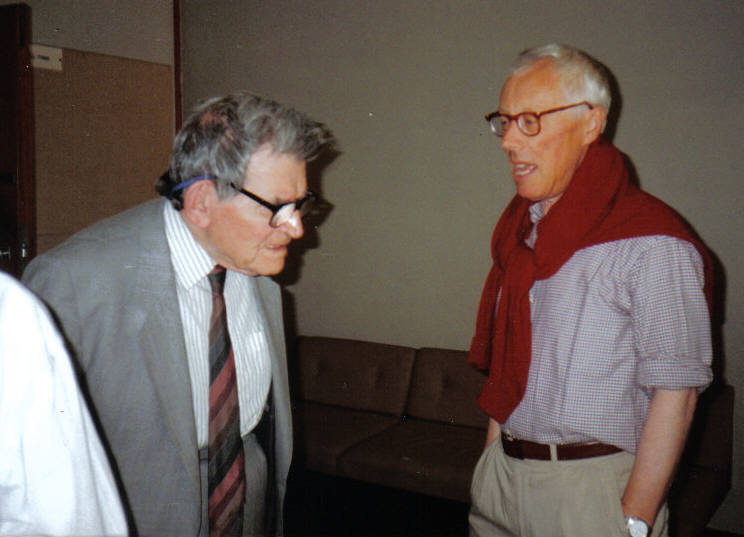
- George Davie with Dr. Vincent Hope in 1996
- Born: 18 March 1912; Dundee, Scotland, UK
- Died: 20 March 2007 (aged 95); Sutton Veny, England, UK
- Occupations: Writer, philosopher, academic
- Spouse: Elspeth Mary Dryer
- Children: 1 daughter
- Writing career
- Pen name: G.E. Davie
- Genres: Non-fiction, philosophy, James Frederick Ferrier

George Elder Davie (18 March 1912 – 20 March 2007) was a prominent Scottish philosopher whose well-received book, The Democratic Intellect (1961), concerns the treatment of philosophy in 19th century Scottish universities.

== Life ==
He was born at no. 4 Baxter Park Terrace, Dundee on 18 March 1912. His father, George Myles Davie was a pharmacist and chemistry teacher, and his mother was Isabella Calder Elder. He married Elspeth Mary Dryer, an art teacher, on 5 October 1944 at Bonnyrigg Church in Midlothian. Elspeth Davie later became a respected writer and was awarded the Katherine Mansfield Prize in 1978. They had one daughter with whom he resided at Sutton Veny, Wiltshire at the time of his death on 20 March 2007.

== Career ==
George Davie was educated at the High School of Dundee, after which he was offered a place at Oxford University but turned it down in favour of the University of Edinburgh. While a student there, he became acquainted with the poet and cultural polemicist Hugh MacDiarmid and in 1934 introduced him to Sorley Maclean, who was training as a teacher at Moray House at the time.

Davie graduated MA in 1935 with a first-class honours degree in Classics. In 1939 he was appointed assistant lecturer in the Department of Philosophy at Edinburgh University. He was assistant to Norman Kemp Smith and later co-edited the latter's collected papers. His English translation of George Buchanan's 'Quam misera sit docentium literas humaniores Lutatiae' was published in Hugh MacDiarmid's anthology Golden Treasury of Scottish Poetry (1940) under the title 'The Sad Lot of the Humanists in Paris'. His war service between 1941 and 1945 was in the Royal Corps of Signals.

After the war, he was appointed lecturer in philosophy at Queen's University, Belfast, where he remained till 1959 when he returned to Edinburgh University as Lecturer. He retired in 1982 and was appointed Reader Emeritus at Edinburgh in 1987. In 1954, he was awarded the degree of DLitt by the University of Edinburgh for his thesis, "The Scotch Metaphysics – the Theory of Knowledge in the Scottish Universities 1730–1860". This thesis was published in 2000 under the title, The Scotch Metaphysics : a Century of Enlightenment in Scotland.

A Conference was held in his honour at Edinburgh University on 13 to 15 September 1996. It was entitled: 'The Legacy of Empiricism, A Conference in Honour of George Davie', and held in the David Hume Tower. On Sunday 15 September 1996, he delivered a conference paper entitled "Five Philosophical Theses from Ferrier". In spite of becoming blind by that time he held the rapt attention of his audience for an hour and a half.

== The Democratic Intellect ==
In this book, Davie deals with the struggle during the 19th century in Scotland to maintain a generalist form of education which is not only philosophical but also scientific, humanistic and democratic. The book has been described as "a thesis about liberal education – pursued by a micro-historical investigation of the culture and academic politics of Scotland's universities in the 19th century. More than 40 years on, the book's discussions of the restriction of academic independence by centralisation, inter-university competition for prestige, research versus teaching and even versus scholarship, notions of abandoning moral discourse for ill-examined claims regarding scientific advance, are still relevant."

Davie's somewhat prolix style of writing is exemplified here:

It is possible to confirm still further the importance which this ideal of a philosophical education had for the Scots if we turn from the achieved pattern of national pedagogy to the plans which were being mooted for its development. What these plans reveal – until well on in the nineteenth century – is the remarkable hold on the country of the belief in the possibility of general education through philosophy. Not that the Scots had any dislike of professional accomplishment; on the contrary, they admired it even to excess, and were eager for the introduction into their educational system of training centres for higher education and specialisation in the new subjects. But the distinctive mark of their thinking about these matters and of the organised projects it inspired was that they wanted to retain philosophy as a compulsory part of what we would now call secondary education (fifteen to nineteen), and that admission to the specialist schools – though it was to be granted early – nevertheless would require, as a preliminary, philosophical education in the old style."

Davie claimed that he had been rebuked by University of Edinburgh Principal, Sir Edward Appleton for the implicit criticism of academic specialism in his book.

== Honours ==
- Honorary Doctorate at Dundee University
- Honorary Doctorate at Edinburgh University, awarded 1995.
- Fellow of the Royal Society of Edinburgh
- Fellow of the Educational Institute of Scotland
- Andrew Fletcher of Saltoun Award of the Saltire Society
- Festschrift published in his honour by Dr. Vincent Hope in 1984

== Publications ==
- The Democratic Intellect: Scotland and her Universities in the Nineteenth Century. Edinburgh: University Press, 1961, 1964 and 1999, ISBN 0-85224-435-5
- The social significance of the Scottish philosophy of common sense, being the Dow lecture delivered before the University of Dundee on 30 November 1972.
- The Scottish Enlightenment. London Historical Association, 1981.
- The Crisis of the Democratic Intellect: The Problem of Generalism and Specialisation in Twentieth-Century Scotland. Edinburgh: Polygon, 1986, ISBN 0-948275-18-9
- 'Scottish Philosophy and Specialisation: a Long View'. Occasional papers of the Royal Society of Edinburgh, nos. 2–6. Edinburgh: 1985, p. 41–56.
- The Scottish Enlightenment and Other Essays. Edinburgh: Polygon, 1991, ISBN 0-7486-6069-0
- A Passion for Ideas: Essays on the Scottish Enlightenment 2. Edinburgh: Polygon, 1994.
- The Scotch Metaphysics : a Century of Enlightenment in Scotland. London & New York: Routledge, 2000.

== Reviews ==
- Maxwell, Stephen (1986), The Crisis of the Democratic Intellect, in Lawson, Alan (ed.), Radical Scotland, Oct/Nov 1986, pp. 16 & 17, ISSN 0262-6993
