= Elspeth Davie =

Scottish writer

- Born: Elspeth Dryer; 20 March 1918; Kilmarnock
- Died: 14 November 1995 (aged 77); Edinburgh
- Occupation: Novelist, short story writer, writer, art educator
- Spouse(s): George Elder Davie

Elspeth Mary Davie (née Dryer) (20 March 1918 - 14 November 1995) was a Scottish novelist, short story writer, painter, and art teacher. Her novels include Providings (1965) and Creating a Scene (1971), but she achieved most of her acclaim for her short stories, principally for the collections The Spark (1968) and The Man Who Wanted To Smell Books (2001).

Davie was awarded the 1978 Katherine Mansfield Prize for Short Stories. Her work was released by Calder Publications. She was married to the Scottish philosopher and writer George Elder Davie.
