= Rosemary Hall (political activist) =

Rosemary Hall (22 April 1925 – 29 May 2011) was a political organiser in the Scottish National Party (SNP).

Born in Aberdeen as Rosemary Johnston, she grew up in Montrose, where her father ran a fishing business and served for a time as Provost. She studied at Cranleigh School in Edinburgh, and was evacuated to Speyside during World War II. She then worked as an administrator in Edinburgh before marrying the architect Eric Hall.

Following her marriage, Hall quit paid work, but became active in the Campaign for Nuclear Disarmament, the Church of Scotland, and in Scottish nationalist politics. She took a public relations position in the party, and in 1965 was appointed as National Organising Secretary. She then served as National Secretary from 1972 to 1975, in which position she organised the successful February and October 1974 general election campaigns.

Party political offices
Preceded by Muriel Gibson	National Secretary of the Scottish National Party; 1972–1975	Succeeded by Muriel Gibson
