= William Livingston (poet) =

Uilleam Mac Dhunlèibhe

- Uilleam Mac Dhunlèibhe
- Born: 1808; Gartmain, near Bowmore, Islay, Scotland
- Died: 1870 (aged 61–62)
- Occupation: Poet
- Writing career
- Language: Scottish Gaelic
- Notable works: A' maidin neochiontas na h-óige, Vindication of the Celtic Character, Eirinn a' Gul, Fios thun a' Bhàird

The poet William Livingston (Scottish Gaelic: Uilleam Mac Dhunlèibhe) (1808–1870) was a Scottish Gaelic poet from Bowmore, Islay and important figure in 19th-century Scottish Gaelic literature.

== Life ==
Livingstone was born upon the farm of Gartmain, near Bowmore (Scottish Gaelic: Bogh Mòr) in Islay (Scottish Gaelic: Ìle) in the Scottish Gàidhealtachd in 1808. A passionate autodidact, he was a tailor by trade, yet he taught himself the Latin, Greek, Hebrew, French and Welsh languages. During his travels through the Scottish lowlands, Livingstone collected an extensive knowledge of the Scottish nation's topography, place-names and folklore.

He lived and worked in multiple locations, including Greenock, before eventually settling in Tradestown, Glasgow.

== Writing ==
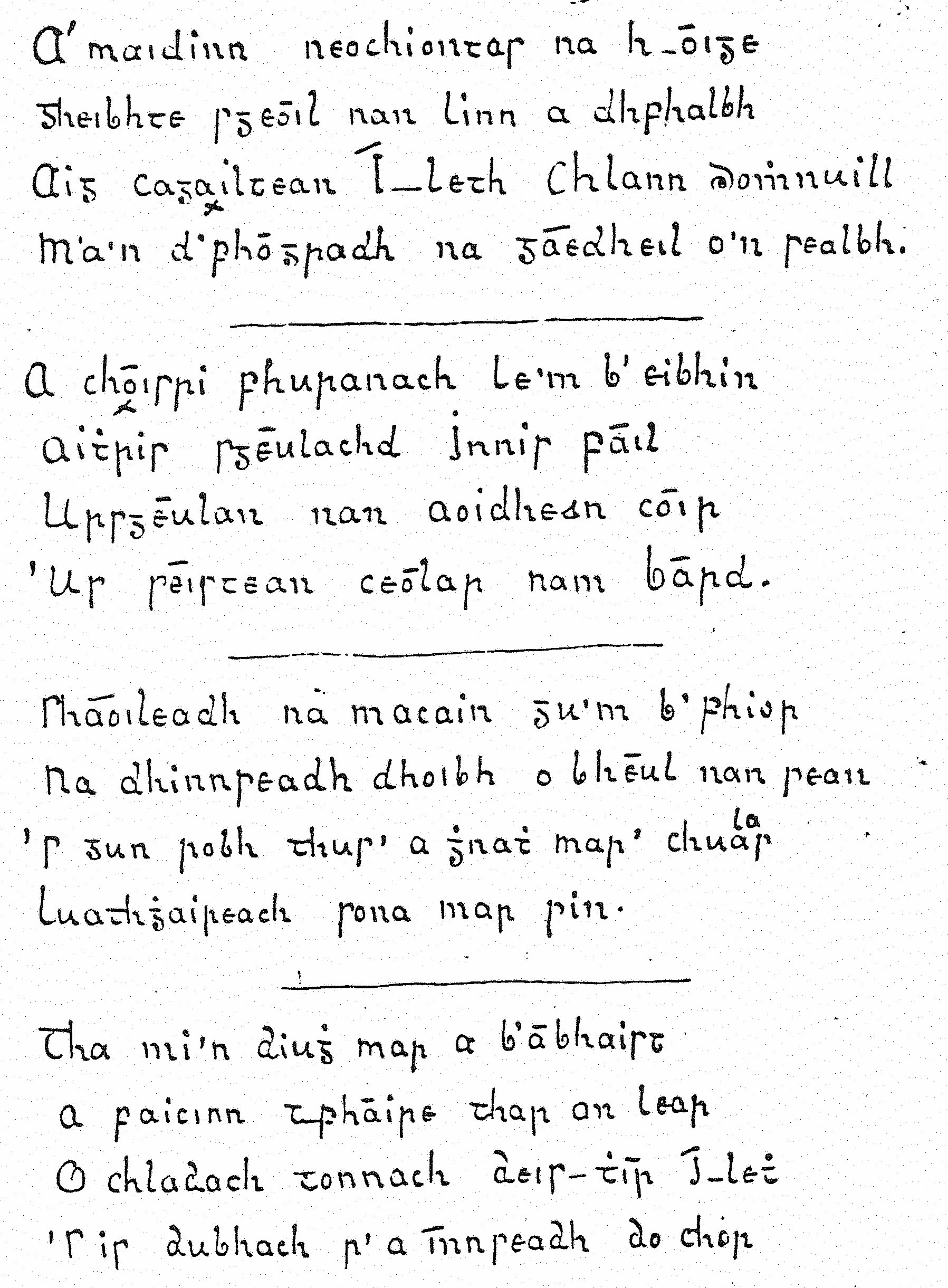
A' maidin neochiontas na h-óige (in Gaelic type, 19th century)

Livingston was a hyper patriotic Scottish nationalist, propagandist for the Gaelic language, war poet, and author of epic poetry.

According to Derick S. Thomson, "Heroic Gaels are always at the center of the action. There is some stirring descriptive verse in these, but the long poems are formless and often bombastic, the epics may owe more to MacPhersons Ossian, too little to Homer. Some of Livingstone's patriotic verse with an evictions background is much tauter, especially Fios thun a' Bhàird."

Enraged by what he saw as, "a war of attrition against the Gaels", embodied in the Highland Clearances, Livingstone published, Vindication of the Celtic Character, which Donald E. Meek has described as, "an untidy and little known compendium of historical narratives and political rants", at Greenock in 1850.

In his 1861 poem Eirinn a' Gul ("Ireland Weeping"), Livingstone recalled the many stories of the Gaels of Inis Fáil (Ireland) he heard in the Ceilidh houses of Islay, before that island was emptied by the Highland Clearances. He then lamented the destruction wreaked upon the Irish people by both famine and brutal mass evictions ordered by Anglo-Irish landlords. He also laments the loss of the Chiefs of the Irish clans, who led their clansmen in war and provided, according to Donald E. Meek, "leadership of the old and true Gaelic kind". Livingstone comments sadly that the mid-19th century leaders and fighters for Irish republicanism had none of the heroic qualities shown by Red Hugh O'Donnell, Hugh O'Neill, and Hugh Maguire during the Nine Years War against Queen Elizabeth I. Sadly, but expressing hope for the future of the Irish people, Livingstone closes by asking where are the Irish clan warriors who charged out of the mist and slaughtered the armies of the Stranger at the Battle of the Yellow Ford and the Battle of Moyry Pass.

In his famous poem Fios thun a' Bhàird ("A Message to the Bard"), which denounces the mass evictions ordered upon Islay after the island was purchased by James Morrison and which was composed to the air When the kye came hame, William Livingstone presents, according to John T. Koch, “a stark view of an Islay in which the human world has been all but banished from the natural landscape.”

Examples of William Livingston's work may be viewed in the Golden Treasury of Scottish Poetry.

Towards the end of his life, Livingstone, according to Donald E. Meek, "produced a fascinating range of celebratory poems, commemorating friends, worthies of the Glasgow Gaelic circuit, and scholars such as Eugene O'Curry."

== See also ==
- Poetry of Scotland
- 1808 in poetry
- 1870 in poetry
- 1882 in poetry
- 1808 in Scotland
- 1865 in Scotland
- 1882 in Scotland
