= Muriel Gibson (politician) =

Scottish nationalist politician

Margaret Muriel Gibson (29 November 1912 – 22 October 2005), known as Muriel Gibson, was a Scottish nationalist politician.

== Life ==
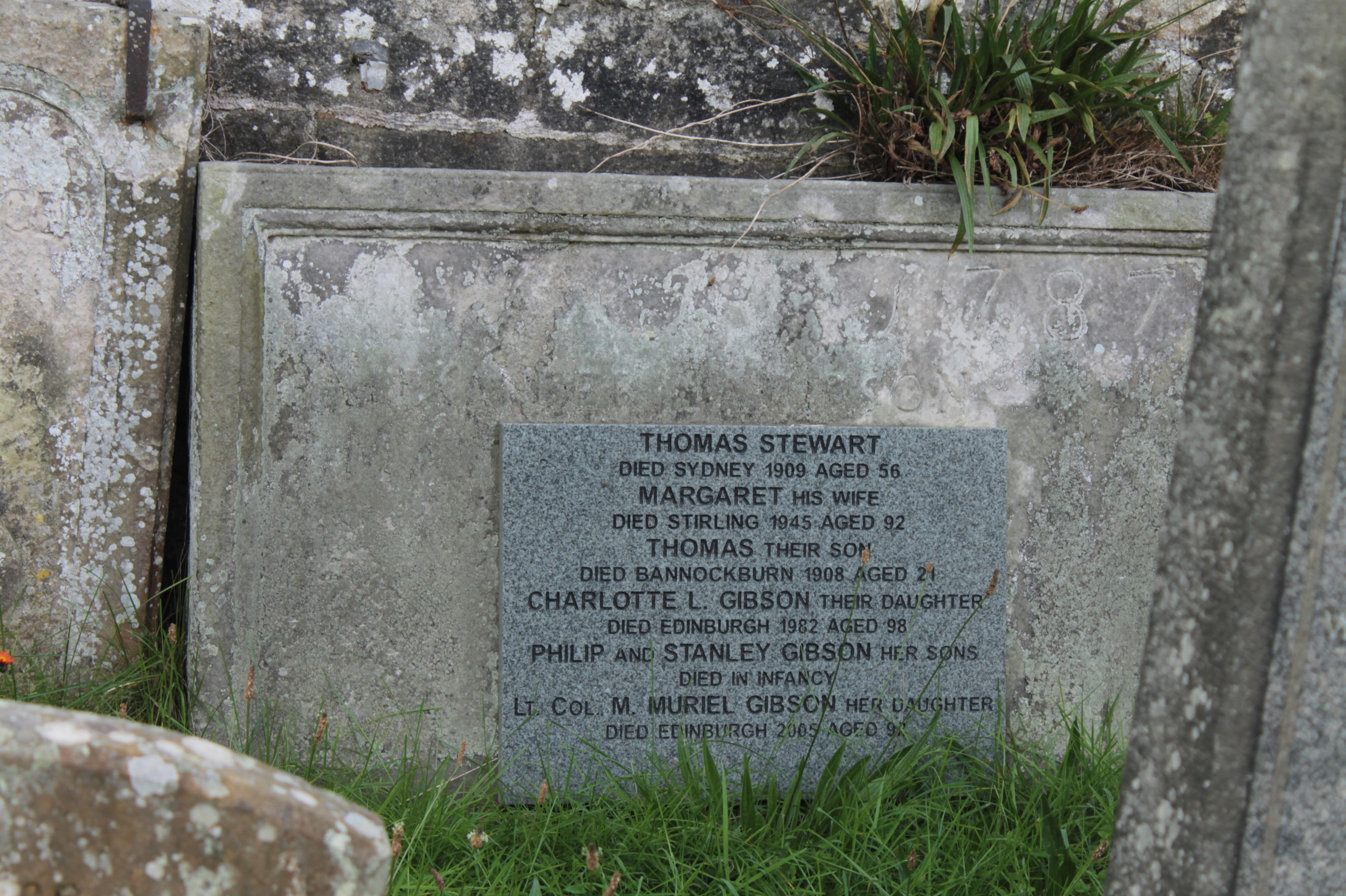
Grave of Lt Col Margaret Muriel Gibson, St Ninian's Churchyard, Stirling

Born in Glasgow, Gibson attended the High School for Girls, before working in the Education Department of Glasgow City Council. She joined the National Party of Scotland in 1932, and then the Scottish National Party upon its formation, and was briefly detained at the start of World War II on account of her membership. In later life, she claimed to have been kept under surveillance for several years; however, she went on to serve in the Voluntary Aid Detachment and then the Women's Royal Army Corps in Africa, Germany and Italy. Although she left at the end of the conflict, she soon rejoined and eventually rose to Lieutenant-Colonel: the second-highest rank of any woman in the British Army at the time.

Back in civilian life, Gibson worked for Ferranti and the Red Cross before becoming organising secretary of the Royal Scottish Country Dance Society. She also served two stints as National Secretary of the SNP, and stood unsuccessfully for the party at the 1970 general election in Edinburgh West.

Party political offices
Preceded by Gordon Wilson	National Secretary of the Scottish National Party; 1971–1972	Succeeded by Rosemary Hall
Preceded by Rosemary Hall	National Secretary of the Scottish National Party; 1975–1977	Succeeded by Chrissie MacWhirter
