= The Crisis of the Democratic Intellect =

- Author: George Elder Davie
- Subject: non-fiction
- Genre: Philosophy
- Publisher: Polygon
- Publication date: 1986
- Media type: Print

The Crisis of the Democratic Intellect: The Problem of Generalism and Specialisation in Twentieth-Century Scotland is a 1986 book by philosopher George Elder Davie.

== Reviews ==
- Maxwell, Stephen, 1986), The Crisis of the Democratic Intellect, in Lawson, Alan (ed.), Radical Scotland, Oct/Nov 1986, pp. 16 & 117, ISSN 0262-6993
