= David Rorie =

David Rorie, DSO, MDCM, DPH (1867 – 18 February 1946) was a medical doctor, folklorist and poet writing in his native language, Scots. As a poet he is known chiefly for his authorship of the well-known song, 'The Lum Hat wantin' the Croon', (sung in Ladysmith during the siege, and widely amongst Scots troops in the Great War) and a volume of collected poems which appeared under that title in 1935.

Educated at Aberdeen and Edinburgh Universities, where he gained an MD in 1908, he was for some years joint Editor of the Caledonian Medical Journal, contributing numerous articles to that journal as well as to the Edinburgh Medical Journal and the British Medical Journal, and becoming a well-known authority on matters of public health in Scotland.

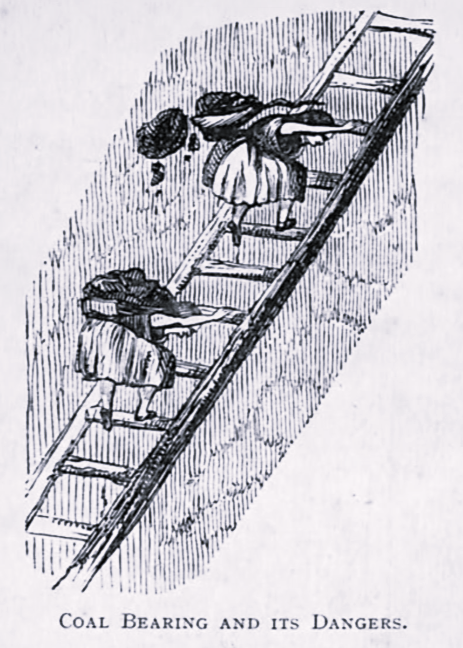
Children coal bearing in Fife

As an enthusiastic collector and editor of Scottish folklore he is known for his interest in folk-medicine and his authorship of Folklore of the Mining Folk of Fife (Folklore Society, 1912) - this last stemming no doubt from his period as a busy doctor in Bowhill (Cardenden), Fife In 1905 he was elected a member of the Harveian Society of Edinburgh.

Dr Rorie served in the RAMC during the 1914-18 War, attained the rank of colonel, and was awarded the DSO and Chevalier de la Légion d'Honneur.
