= 79 Group =

- Ideology: Socialism; Left-wing nationalism Scottish Independence Scottish republicanism
- Political position: Left-wing

The 79 Group was a faction within the Scottish National Party (SNP), named after its year of formation, 1979. The group sought to persuade the SNP to take an active left-wing stance, arguing that it would win more support; they were also highly critical of the established SNP leaders. Although it had a small membership, the group caused sufficient disquiet that it was expelled from the SNP in 1982. Nonetheless, its members were subsequently readmitted and many attained senior positions in the Scottish Government after 2007. Alex Salmond, a leading member of the group, later became First Minister from 2007 to 2014.

== Background ==
The idea for the 79 Group came from Roseanna Cunningham, then assistant research officer for the SNP, and her brother Chris, during the devolution referendum in early 1979. Although a majority of those voting backed devolution in the referendum, the vote was close and crucially the Yes votes did not reach the threshold of 40% of the electorate set by Parliament. At the SNP national council meeting a few days after the result of the referendum, Margo MacDonald argued that because working-class Scots had supported devolution and middle-class Scots had opposed, the SNP should aim to build its support among the working-class.

A group of eight SNP members who shared this opinion met on 10 March 1979. Before they could meet again, the SNP lost nine of its 11 seats in the 1979 general election; the poor result prompted a period of internal questioning by many SNP members about the direction the party should take. More than 30 attended a second meeting at the Belford Hotel in Edinburgh on 31 May which agreed to set up an "Interim Committee for Political Discussion". This interim committee later became the 79 Group.

== Formation ==
The founders decided to establish their group on a formal footing, with membership cards and elected officers. Three spokespeople were appointed, including Margo MacDonald and Alex Salmond. Stephen Maxwell became the group's principal political theorist. The group was formed as a left wing organisation committed to the establishment of a "socialist and republican Scotland". They began producing campaign material in support of their policies, and standing for internal SNP posts. The established SNP wing, now dubbed "traditionalists", disliked the party appearing ideological. Winifred Ewing eventually formed the 'Campaign for Nationalism in Scotland' as a second internal SNP group to oppose the 79 Group.

Many SNP activists became attracted to the 79 Group, seeing it as a debating forum to discuss the SNP's future, but most left quickly when not attracted by the ideology driving the group. At the 1979 SNP conference, 79 Group candidates were heavily defeated by those in the SNP who put achieving independence over all other policy considerations.

== Advances ==
In 1980, the former Labour MP and founder of the Scottish Labour Party (SLP), Jim Sillars, joined the SNP along with some other SLP members. Given the SLP's stance on the left, Sillars was naturally in line with the 79 Group's policy and immediately joined it too. Although no members of the 79 Group were elected to the SNP National executive at the 1980 conference less than a month after Sillars joined, at the 1981 SNP conference, five were.

== Scottish Resistance ==
A passionate appeal by Stephen Maxwell failed to get a motion critical of private industry passed at the 1981 conference, but conference did vote by a big majority for a motion calling for "a real Scottish resistance" including "political strikes and civil disobedience on a mass scale" after a speech by Sillars. The new policy, dubbed "Scottish Resistance", was unveiled in September 1981 with a logo consisting of figures with raised clenched fists.

Sillars, who was elected as the SNP's Executive Vice-Chairman for Policy, was put in charge of the campaign with the details planned by the Demonstrations Committee. He led the campaign on 16 October 1981 by breaking in, with five other 79 Group members, to the Royal High School in Edinburgh which had been converted to house the Scottish Assembly. The intention had been to symbolically read out a declaration on what the Scottish Assembly would have done to counter unemployment, but the participants were arrested before they had the chance, and a planned later mass demonstration was cancelled. Sillars was later fined for wilful damage by breaking a window to get in. Many in the SNP were uncomfortable with this sort of action; three senior members were quoted in The Scotsman opposing the occupation.

== 79 Group News ==
From the Spring of 1981, the 79 Group published a monthly newsletter entitled 79 Group News. The Editorial Committee comprised Chris Cunningham, Stewart Buchanan, Steve Butler, Graeme Purves and Douglas Robertson. After the group was proscribed, Graeme Purves, Douglas Robertson and graphic designer Crawford Cumming became members of the team which relaunched Radical Scotland as a bi-monthly political magazine edited by Kevin Dunion in February 1983.

== Proscription of the 79 Group ==
Early in 1982, Sinn Féin wrote inviting a 79 Group speaker to its ardfheis (conference). With Provisional Irish Republican Army violence ongoing, Sinn Féin were considered unacceptable to public opinion in Great Britain. Alex Salmond moved to reject the request and won, but minutes of the meeting were leaked to the press, linking the two groups. Soon after, the 1982 conference of the SNP voted to ditch "Scottish Resistance", despite a strong speech by Salmond claiming that to do so was to adopt "a defeatist and cringing mentality". Many non-79 Group members felt that the civil disobedience campaign had collapsed in farce.

The SNP leadership under Gordon Wilson finally decided that the group's activity must be stopped. At the 1982 SNP conference in Ayr, Wilson threatened to resign unless the conference passed a motion to proscribe all organised political groupings within the party (the motion covered Winifred Ewing's Campaign for Nationalism in Scotland as well). He won what was described as a Pyrrhic victory by 308 to 188. However the 79 Group's members mostly retained their offices within the party. Siol nan Gaidheal was similarly proscribed in 1982.

== Expulsions ==
After the conference resolution, the 79 Group decided to agree to disband, but rather than going away, the Group formed an interim committee to create the "79 Group Socialist Society" outside the party. The interim committee was the same as the executive of the 79 Group. The National Executive declared that membership of this committee was incompatible with that of the SNP.

Armed with the conference mandate, the leadership then moved to expel the leading 79 Group members. Alex Salmond, Kenny MacAskill, Stephen Maxwell, and others were expelled; Roseanna Cunningham was not, on the grounds that she was not a member of the interim committee. Margo MacDonald was not expelled but resigned from the SNP in protest. Other members of the 79 Group in party offices were left alone; when the expelled members appealed against their expulsion, the committee hearing the appeal included 79 Group member Stewart Stevenson.

A Scottish Socialist Society was formed, open to non-SNP members; among those who joined were Susan Deacon and Sarah Boyack, who later became Labour MSPs. However the society was short-lived.

The appeals were narrowly rejected when the SNP National Council debated the report of the Appeals Committee. However, the substantial support for those expelled and the minority report submitted by Stewart Stevenson persuaded National Council to allow their re-admission to the SNP. Once back in the party many would go on to high office in the SNP.
