= Scottish National Party =

Political party

Scottish National Party Pàrtaidh Nàiseanta na h-Alba Scots National Pairty
- Abbreviation: SNP
- Leader: John Swinney
- Depute leader: Keith Brown
- Westminster leader: Dave Doogan
- President: Maureen Watt
- Chief executive: Callum McCaig
- Founded: 7 April 1934; 92 years ago
- Merger of: National Party of Scotland; Scottish Party
- Headquarters: Gordon Lamb House, Edinburgh
- Student wing: SNP Students
- Youth wing: Young Scots for Independence
- LGBT wing: Out for Independence
- Membership (December 2025): 51,000
- Ideology: Scottish nationalism; Scottish independence; Social democracy
- Political position: Centre-left
- European affiliation: European Free Alliance
- Colours: Yellow; Black
- Anthem: "Scots Wha Hae" ('Scots Who Have')
- House of Commons: 8 / 57 (Scottish seats)
- Scottish Parliament: 57 / 129
- Councillors in Scotland: 413 / 1,226
- Councils led in Scotland: 15 / 32

Election symbol

Website
- snp.org

The Scottish National Party (SNP; Scottish Gaelic: Pàrtaidh Nàiseanta na h-Alba [ˈpʰaːrˠtʰi ˈn̪ˠaːʃən̪ˠt̪ə nə ˈhal̪ˠapə] Scots: Scots National Pairty) is a Scottish nationalist and social democratic political party in Scotland. It holds 57 of the 129 seats in the Scottish Parliament and 8 out of the 57 Scottish seats in the House of Commons. It is represented by 413 of the 1,226 local councillors across Scotland. The SNP supports and campaigns for Scottish independence from the United Kingdom and for an independent Scotland's membership in the European Union, with a platform based on centre-left progressive social policies and civic nationalism.

Founded in 1934 with the amalgamation of the National Party of Scotland and the Scottish Party, it has had continuous parliamentary representation in Westminster since Winnie Ewing won the 1967 Hamilton by-election. At the February 1974 general election it scored 22% of the vote and 30% in the October general election of the same year; it received 7 seats in the former and 11 in the latter of 72 Scottish seats up for election. With the establishment of the devolved Scottish Parliament in 1999, the SNP became the second-largest party, serving two terms as the opposition to a Labour–Liberal Democrat coalition.

The SNP entered government under Alex Salmond at the 2007 Scottish Parliament election with 45% of the vote, forming a minority government, before going on to win the 2011 Parliament election, after which it formed Holyrood's first majority government. After Scotland voted against independence in the 2014 referendum, Salmond resigned and was succeeded by Nicola Sturgeon. In the run up to the 2015 election, the SNP tripled its membership to 110,000. The SNP achieved a record number of 56 seats in Westminster after the 2015 general election to become the third-largest party but in Holyrood it was reduced back to being a minority government at the 2016 election. At the 2021 election, the SNP gained one seat and entered a power-sharing agreement with the Scottish Greens. In that same year, the police launched Operation Branchform to examine claims the party had misused donations. In March 2023, Sturgeon resigned as first minister and party leader and was succeeded by Humza Yousaf.

In April 2024, Yousaf collapsed the power-sharing deal with the Greens and resigned the following week due to the fallout from the decision. The current leader, John Swinney, was elected in May 2024. At the 2024 general election, the SNP lost 6 seats, remaining the biggest party in Scotland and the fourth-largest party in the House of Commons. The SNP does not have any members of the House of Lords on the principle that it opposes an unelected upper house of Parliament and calls for it to be scrapped. The SNP is a member of the European Free Alliance (EFA).

== History ==
=== Foundation and early breakthroughs (1934–1970) ===
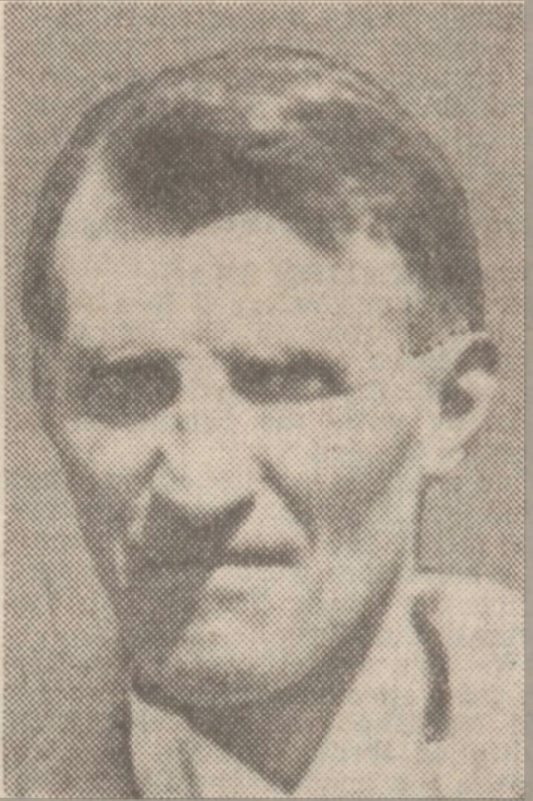
Alexander MacEwen, the first leader of the Scottish National Party from 1934 to 1936

The SNP was formed in 1934 through the merger of the National Party of Scotland and the Scottish Party, with the Duke of Montrose as its first president and Cunninghame Graham as Honorary Vice-President. Alexander MacEwen was its first chairman.

The party was divided on its approach to the Second World War. Professor Douglas Young, who was SNP leader from 1942 to 1945, campaigned for the Scottish people to refuse conscription and his activities were popularly vilified as undermining the British war effort against the Axis powers. Young was imprisoned for refusing to be conscripted. The party suffered its first split during this period with John MacCormick leaving the party in 1942, owing to his failure to change the party's policy from supporting all-out independence to Home Rule at that year's conference in Glasgow. McCormick went on to form the Scottish Covenant Association, a non-partisan political organisation campaigning for the establishment of a devolved Scottish Assembly.

However, wartime conditions also enabled the SNP's first parliamentary success at the Motherwell by-election in 1945, but Robert McIntyre MP lost the seat at the general election three months later. The 1950s were characterised by similarly low levels of support, and this made it difficult for the party to advance. Indeed, in most general elections they were unable to put up more than a handful of candidates. The 1960s, however, offered more electoral successes, with candidates polling credibly at Glasgow Bridgeton in 1961, West Lothian in 1962 and Glasgow Pollok in 1967. Plaid Cymru, a Welsh nationalist party that co-operates with the SNP, won the Camarthern by-election in 1966 with Gwynfor Evans becoming their first MP. This foreshadowed Winnie Ewing's surprise victory the following year in a by-election at the previously safe Labour seat of Hamilton. This brought the SNP to national prominence, leading to the establishment of the Kilbrandon Commission.

=== Becoming a notable force (1970s) ===
In October 1974 the SNP won 11 constituencies, a record that would stand until Nicola Sturgeon assumed the party's leadership.

Despite this breakthrough, the 1970 general election was to prove a disappointment for the party as, despite an increase in vote share, Ewing failed to retain her seat in Hamilton. The party did receive some consolation with the capture of the Western Isles, making Donald Stewart the party's only MP. This was to be the case until the 1973 by-election at Glasgow Govan where a hitherto safe Labour seat was claimed by Margo MacDonald.

1974 was to prove something of an annus mirabilis for the party, as it deployed its highly effective It's Scotland's oil campaign. The SNP gained six seats at the February general election before hitting a high point in the October re-run, polling almost a third of all votes in Scotland and returning 11 MPs to Westminster. Furthermore, during that year's local elections the party claimed overall control of Cumbernauld and Kilsyth.

This success was to continue for much of the decade, and at the 1977 district elections the SNP saw victories at councils including East Kilbride and Falkirk and held the balance of power in Glasgow. However, this level of support was not to last and by 1978 Labour revival was evident at three by-elections (Glasgow Garscadden, Hamilton and Berwick and East Lothian) as well as the regional elections.

In 1976, James Callaghan's minority government made an agreement with the SNP and Plaid Cymru. In return for their support in the Commons, the government would respond to the Kilbrandon commission and legislate to devolve powers from Westminster to Scotland and Wales. The resulting Scotland Act 1978 would create a Scottish assembly, subject to a referendum. Labour, the Liberals and the SNP campaigned for a "yes" vote in the referendum on the Scotland Act and "yes" won a majority, but a threshold imposed by anti-devolution Labour MP George Cunningham requiring 40% of the electorate to be in favour was not reached due to low turnout. When the government decided not to implement the Act, the SNP's MPs withdrew their support and voted to support Margaret Thatcher's motion of no confidence in Callaghan's government. In the ensuing general election, the party experienced a large drop in its support. Reduced to just 2 MPs, the successes of October 1974 were not to be surpassed until the 2015 general election.

=== Factional divisions and infighting (1980s) ===
The 79 Group sought to define the party on the left.

Following this defeat, a period of internal strife occurred within the party, culminating with the formation of the left-wing 79 Group. Traditionalists within the party, centred around Winnie Ewing, by this time an MEP, responded by establishing the Campaign for Nationalism in Scotland which sought to ensure that the primary objective of the SNP was campaigning for independence without a traditional left-right orientation, even though this would have undone the work of figures such as William Wolfe, who developed a clearly social democratic policy platform throughout the 1970s.

These events ensured the success of a leadership motion at the party's annual conference of 1982, in Ayr, despite the 79 Group being bolstered by the merger of Jim Sillars' Scottish Labour Party (SLP) although this influx of ex-SLP members further shifted the characteristics of the party leftwards. Despite this, traditionalist figure Gordon Wilson remained party leader through the electoral disappointments of 1983 and 1987, where he lost his own Dundee East seat won 13 years prior.

Through this period, Sillars' influence in the party grew, developing a clear socio-economic platform including Independence in Europe, reversing the SNP's previous opposition to membership of the then-EEC which had been unsuccessful in a 1975 referendum. This position was enhanced further by Sillars reclaiming Glasgow Govan in a by-election in 1988.

Despite this moderation, the party did not join Labour, the Liberal Democrats and the Greens as well as civil society in the Scottish Constitutional Convention which developed a blueprint for a devolved Scottish Parliament due to the unwillingness of the convention to discuss independence as a constitutional option.

=== First Salmond era (1990s) ===
In 1994 the SNP gained control of Tayside, the only time the party controlled a regional council, albeit without a majority.

Alex Salmond was elected MP for Banff and Buchan in 1987, after the re-admittance of 79 Group members, and was able to seize the party leadership after Wilson's resignation in 1990 after a contest with Margaret Ewing. This was a surprise victory as Ewing had the backing of much of the party establishment, including Sillars and then-party secretary John Swinney. The defection of Labour MP Dick Douglas further evidenced the party's clear left-wing positioning, particularly regarding opposition to the poll tax. Despite this, Salmond's leadership was unable to avert a fourth successive general election disappointment in 1992 with the party reduced back from 5 to 3 MPs.

The mid-90s offered some successes for the party, with North East Scotland being gained at the 1994 European elections and the party securing a by-election at Perth and Kinross in 1995 after a near-miss at Monklands East the previous year. 1997 offered the party's most successful general election for 23 years, although in the face of the Labour landslide the party was unable to match either of the two 1974 elections. That September, the party joined with the members of the Scottish Constitutional Convention in the successful Yes-Yes campaign in the devolution referendum which led to the establishment of a Scottish Parliament with tax-varying powers.

In 1999, the first elections to the parliament were held. The party suffered a disappointing result, gaining just 35 MSPs in the face of Salmond's unpopular 'Kosovo Broadcast' which opposed NATO intervention in the country.

=== Opposing Labour-Liberal Democrat coalitions (1999–2007) ===
This meant that the party began as the official opposition in the parliament to a Labour-Liberal Democrat coalition government. Salmond found the move to a more consensual politics difficult and sought a return to Westminster, resigning the leadership in 2000 with John Swinney, like Salmond a gradualist, victorious in the ensuring leadership election. Swinney's leadership proved ineffectual, with a loss of one MP in 2001 and a further reduction to 27 MSPs in 2003 despite the Officegate scandal unseating previous First Minister Henry McLeish. However, the only parties to gain seats in that election were the Scottish Greens and the Scottish Socialist Party (SSP) which like the SNP support independence.

Following an unsuccessful leadership challenge in 2003, Swinney stepped down following disappointing results in the European elections of 2004 with Salmond victorious in the subsequent leadership contest despite initially refusing to be candidate. Nicola Sturgeon was elected Depute Leader and became the party's leader in the Scottish Parliament until Salmond was able to return at the next parliamentary election.

=== Salmond governments (2007–2014) ===
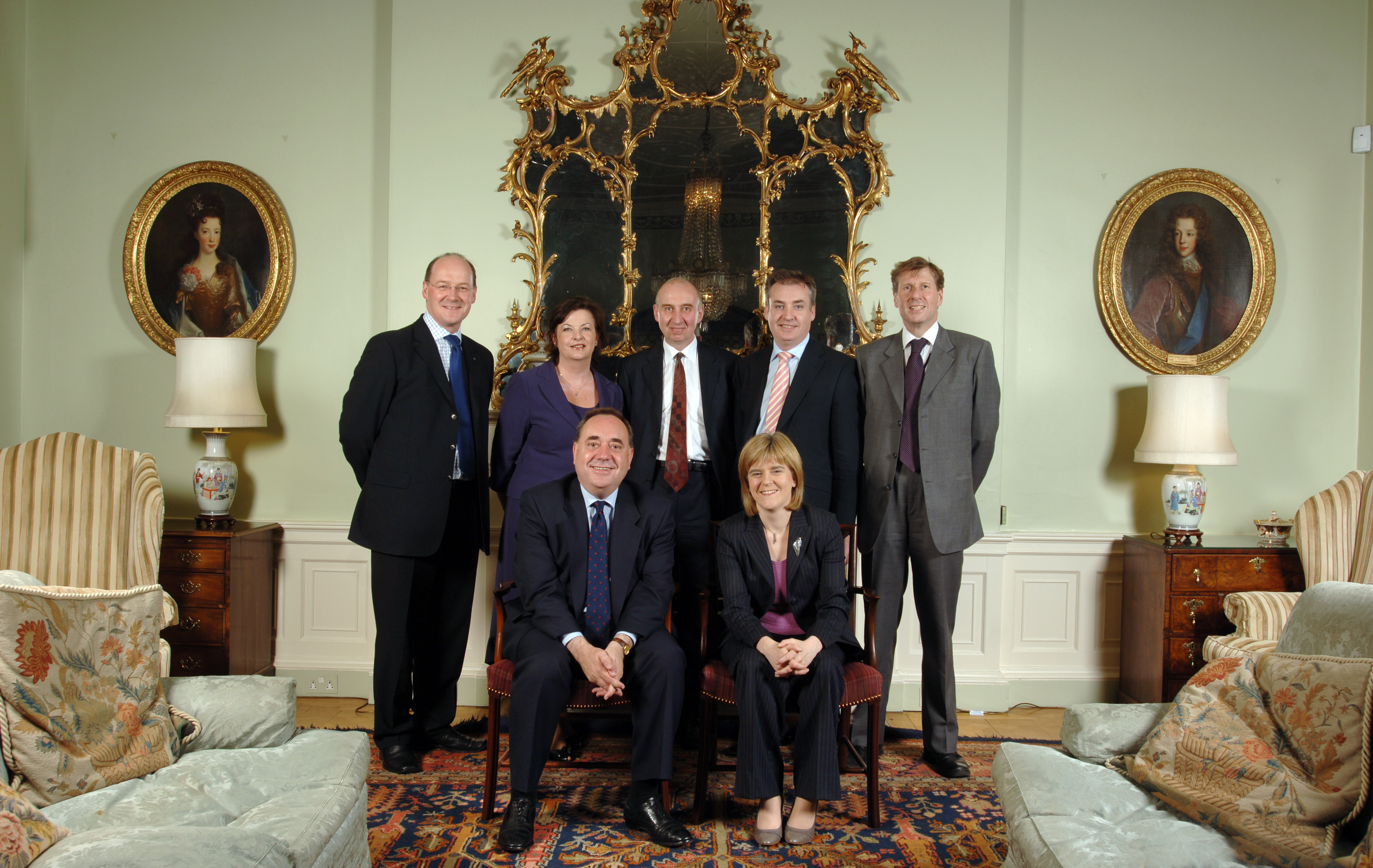
The first SNP government led by Alex Salmond as First Minister of Scotland, here seated next to Nicola Sturgeon who served as his deputy, in Bute House

In 2007, the SNP emerged as the largest party in the Scottish Parliament with 47 of 129 seats, narrowly ousting Scottish Labour with 46 seats and Alex Salmond becoming First Minister after ousting the Liberal Democrats in Gordon. The Scottish Greens supported Salmond's election as First Minister, and his subsequent appointments of ministers, in return for early tabling of the climate change bill and the SNP nominating a Green MSP to chair a parliamentary committee. Despite this, Salmond's minority government tended to strike budget deals with the Conservatives to stay in office.

In the final few years of the New Labour government, there were four parliamentary by-elections in Scotland. The SNP saw marginal swings towards the party in three of them; 2006 in Dunfermline and West Fife, 2008 in Glenrothes and 2009 in Glasgow North East. None were as notable than the 2008 Glasgow East by-election, in which the SNP's John Mason took the third safest Labour seat in Scotland on a 22.5% swing.

In May 2011, the SNP won an overall majority in the Scottish Parliament with 69 seats. This was followed by a reverse in the party's previous opposition to NATO membership at the party's annual conference in 2012 despite Salmond's refusal to apologise for the Kosovo broadcast on the occasion of the Kosovo Declaration of Independence.

This majority enabled the SNP government to hold a referendum on Scottish independence in 2014. The "No" vote prevailed in a close-fought campaign, prompting the resignation of First Minister Alex Salmond. Forty-five percent of Scottish voters cast their ballots for independence, with the "Yes" side receiving less support than late polling predicted. Exit polling by Lord Ashcroft suggested that many No voters thought independence too risky, while others voted for the Union because of their emotional attachment to Britain. Older voters, women and middle class voters voted no in margins above the national average.

Following the Yes campaign's defeat, Salmond resigned and Nicola Sturgeon won that year's leadership election unopposed.

=== Sturgeon years (2014–2023) ===
In 2015, the SNP won 56 out of 59 seats and 50% of the popular vote.

The SNP rebounded from their loss at the independence referendum at the 2015 general election eight months later, led by former Depute Leader Nicola Sturgeon. The party went from holding six seats in the House of Commons to 56, ending 51 years of dominance by the Scottish Labour Party. All but three of the fifty-nine constituencies in the country elected an SNP candidate in the party's most comprehensive electoral victory at any level.

At the 2016 Scottish election, the SNP lost a net total of six seats, losing its overall majority in the Scottish Parliament, but returning for a third consecutive term as a minority government despite gaining an additional 1.1% of the constituency vote, for the party's best-ever result, from the 2011 election however 2.3% of the regional list vote. On the constituency vote, the SNP gained a net 10 seats from Labour. The Conservatives and Liberal Democrats each gained two constituency seats from the SNP on 2011.

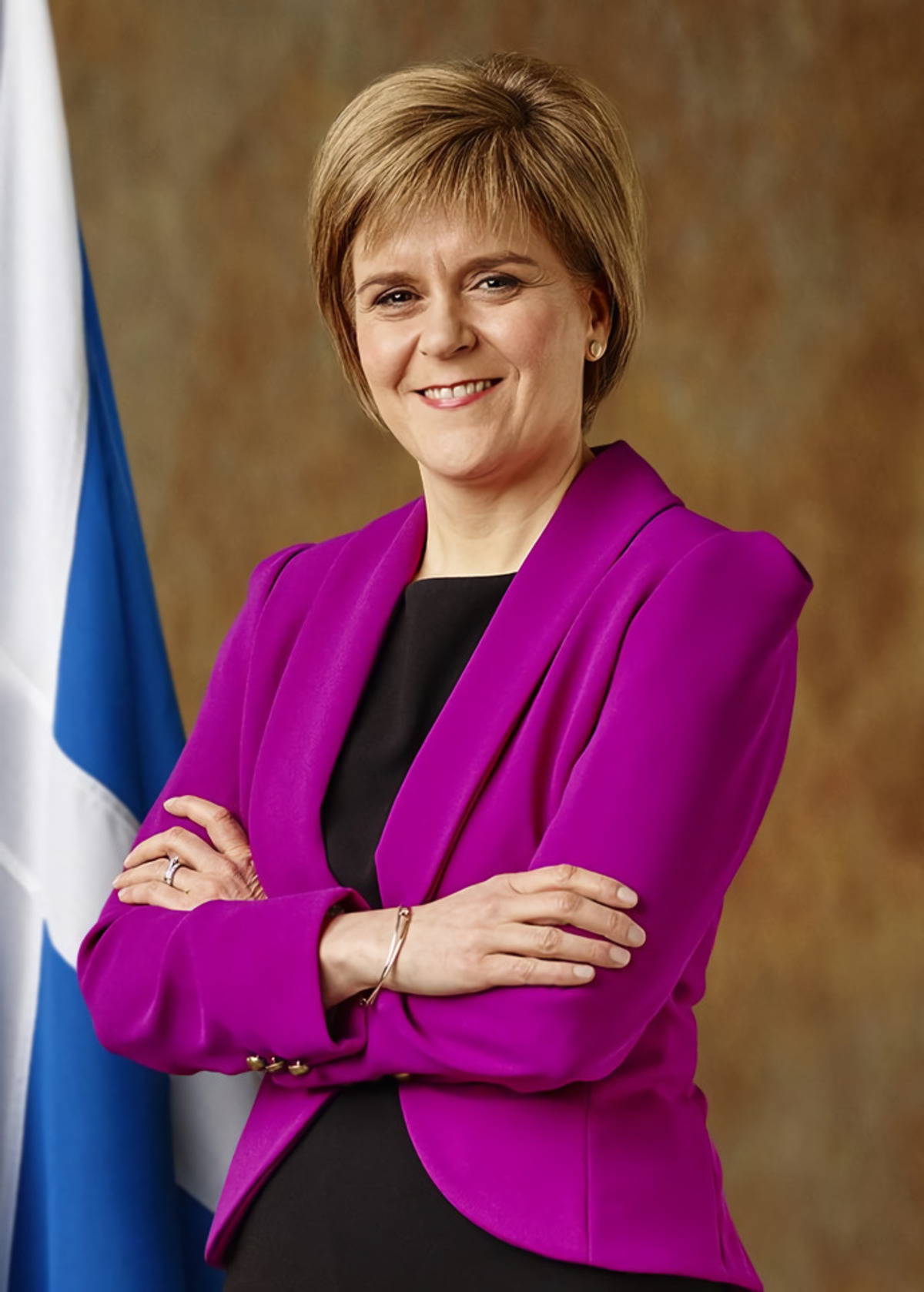
Nicola Sturgeon led the party and served as First Minister for eight years from November 2014 to March 2023.

This election was followed by the 2016 European Union referendum, after which the SNP joined with the Liberal Democrats and Greens to call for continued UK membership of the EU. Despite a consequential increase in the Conservative Party vote at the 2017 local elections the SNP for the first time became the largest party in each of Scotland's four city councils: Aberdeen, Dundee, Edinburgh and Glasgow, where a Labour administration was ousted after 37 years.

At the 2017 general election, the SNP underperformed compared to polling expectations, losing 21 seats to bring their number of Commons seats down to 35 – however, this was still the party's second-best result ever at the time. This was largely attributed by many, including former Deputy First Minister John Swinney, to their stance on holding a second Scottish independence referendum and saw a swing to the unionist parties, with seats being picked up by the Conservatives, Labour and the Liberal Democrats and a reduction in their majorities in the other seats. High-profile losses included SNP Commons leader Angus Robertson and former SNP leader and First Minister Alex Salmond.

The SNP went on to achieve its best-ever European Parliament result in the final election before Brexit, the party taking its MEP total to three (or half of Scottish seats) and achieving a record vote share for the party. This was also the best performance of any party in the era of proportional elections to the European Parliament in Scotland. This was suggested as being due to the party's europhile sentiment during what amounted to a single-issue election.

Later that year, the SNP experienced a surge in support at the 2019 general election, winning a 45.0% share of the vote and 48 seats, its second-best result ever. The party gained seven seats from the Conservatives and 6 from Labour. This victory was generally attributed to Sturgeon's cautious approach regarding holding a second independence referendum and a strong emphasis on retaining EU membership during the election campaign. The following January, the strengthened Conservative government ensured that the UK left the European Union on 31 January 2020.

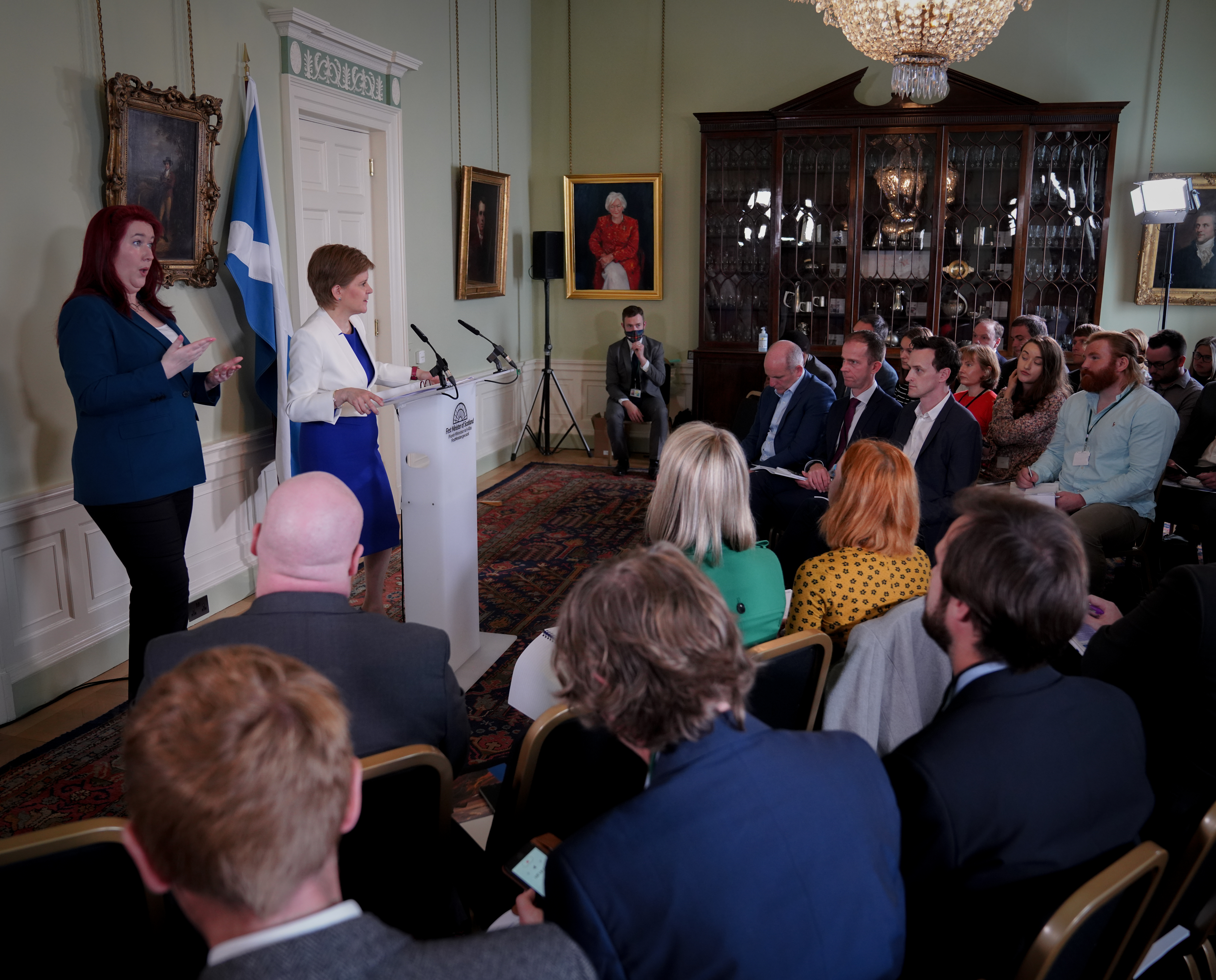
Sturgeon addresses journalists at Bute House over her plans to hold a referendum in 2023, a proposal that would fail after the Supreme Court ruled the parliament didn't have the power.

At the 2021 Scottish election, the SNP won 64 seats, one seat short of a majority, albeit achieving a record high number of votes, vote share and constituency seats, and leading to another minority government led by the SNP. Sturgeon emphasised after her party's victory that it would focus on controlling the COVID-19 pandemic as well as pushing for a second referendum on independence.

Although they won with a majority in 2021, a majority of MSPs elected had come from parties that supported Scottish independence; this prompted negotiations between the SNP and the Scottish Green Party to secure a deal that would see Green ministers appointed to government and the Scottish Greens backing SNP policies, with hopes that this united front on independence would solidify the SNP's mandate for the second independence referendum. The Third Sturgeon government was formed with Green support.

In July 2021, the Scottish Police launched an investigation into possibly missing funds raised between 2017 and 2020 specifically for a second referendum. The investigation was given the code name Operation Branchform. In the 2022 Scottish local elections, the SNP remained as the biggest party, winning a record number of councillors and securing majority control of Dundee. On 15 February 2023, Sturgeon announced her intention to resign as leader and first minister.

On 16 March 2023, it was revealed that the SNP's membership had fallen to 72,000, down from over 125,000 at the end of 2019. As a result of this, CEO Peter Murrell resigned on 18 March after criticism was levied at him over the way the figures were published.

=== Yousaf era (March 2023–May 2024) ===
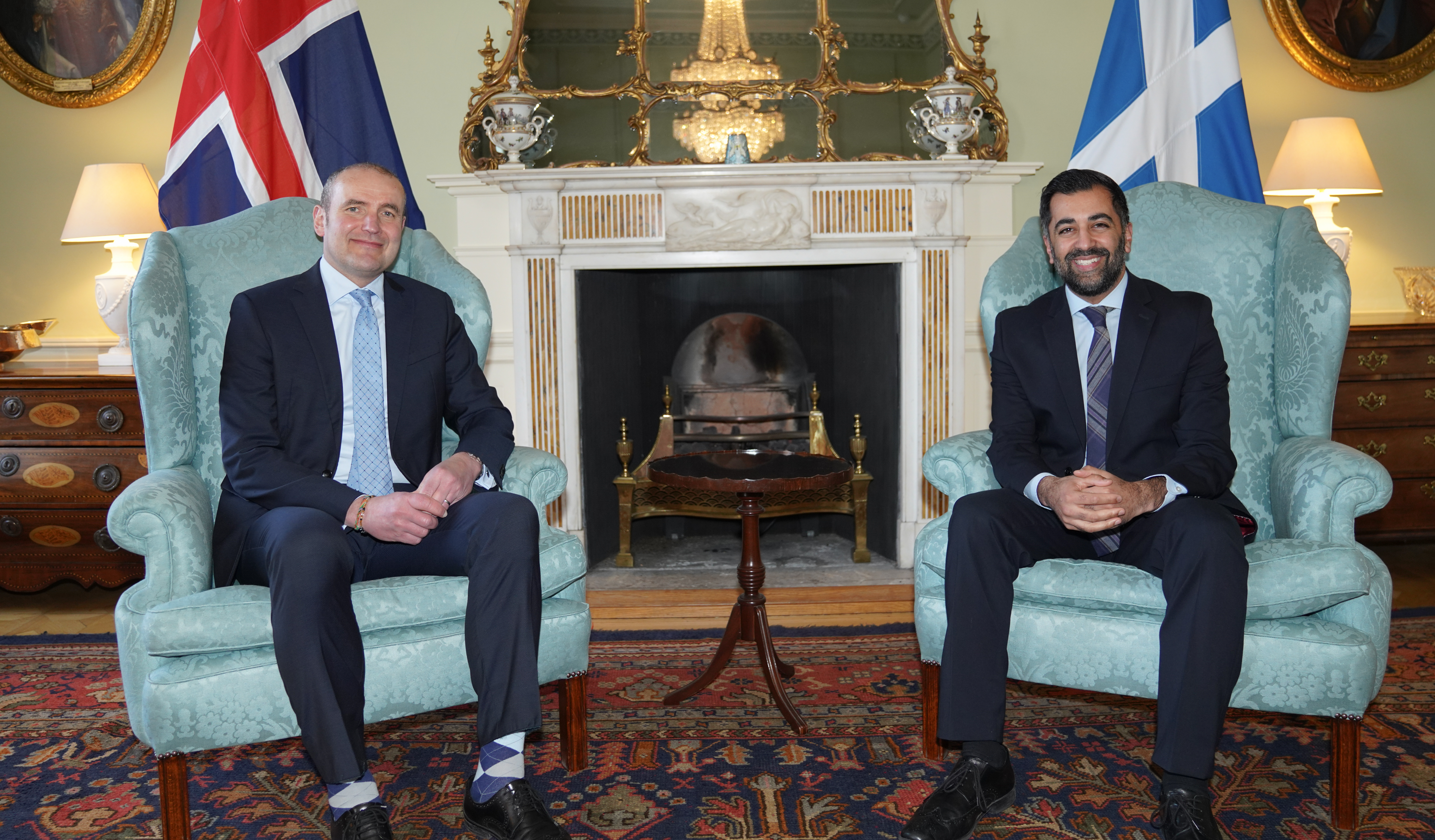
Yousaf meets with President of Iceland, Guðni Th. Jóhannesson, 2024

Humza Yousaf was announced as the next Leader of the Scottish National Party on 27 March 2023 after winning the leadership election. Yousaf defeated challenger Kate Forbes in the final stage, with 52% of the vote to Forbes' 48%. The leadership election was dominated by the strategy for a second independence referendum and the Gender Recognition Reform Bill, which has divided the party. On 29 March 2023, Yousaf was appointed First Minister of Scotland. On 18 April, his government published its policy prospectus titled "Equality, opportunity, community: New leadership – A fresh start"

On 23 August 2023, Murray Foote was appointed as the new Chief Executive of the SNP. On 12 October 2023, MP Lisa Cameron crossed the floor to join the Scottish Conservatives, ahead of counting the votes on her selection contest within the SNP for the 2024 United Kingdom general election. She became the first elected representative from the SNP to defect to a unionist party. Cameron claimed a "toxic and bullying" culture in the SNP led to her defection.

On 15 October 2023, the SNP National Conference voted in favour of Yousaf's strategy on Scottish independence, including a number of amendments proposed from senior SNP representatives. This committed the SNP to launching a Scotland-wide independence campaign before the end of 2023. Yousaf also made a number of policy announcements, including a freeze on Council Tax rates, additional funding for the NHS to reduce waiting lists as well as the issuing of government bonds to fund infrastructure projects.

On 25 April 2024, it was announced that the Bute House Agreement would come to an end before a vote was to be held by the Scottish Greens on whether to continue the agreement. Four days later, Yousaf announced that he would be resigning as Leader of the Scottish National Party and as First Minister of Scotland.

==== Operation Branchform ====
In April 2023, two SNP officials were arrested and released without charge in connection with the investigation into Scottish National Party finances: Peter Murrell was arrested on 5 April and Colin Beattie, the SNP treasurer, on 18 April. Murrell is the husband of former party leader, Nicola Sturgeon. The day Murrell was arrested and interviewed, Police Scotland also searched a number of addresses, including the SNP's headquarters and Murrell's home in Glasgow. Beattie resigned as SNP treasurer and was replaced by Stuart McDonald.

Also in April, it was reported that the SNP's auditors, Johnston Carmichael, had resigned from their role around October 2022, and were yet to be replaced, three months before the party's accounts 2022 were due to be submitted to the Electoral Commission. New auditors were appointed in May. Filing the party accounts in June 2023, the new auditors highlighted that they had not been able to find original records for some cash and cheques.

Murrell was re-arrested on 18 April 2024 and charged with embezzlement. He later resigned his membership of the SNP. A Crown Office and Procurator Fiscal Service spokesman confirmed that it received a report in relation to Murrell and that an investigation into two other individuals "a man aged 72 and a 53-year-old woman" were still ongoing. Murrell appeared in court for the first time on 20 March 2025 charged with embezzlement. He was released on bail. At the same time, Police Scotland confirmed that its inquiries into Nicola Sturgeon and Colin Beattie had concluded and they were no longer under investigation.

=== Swinney era (May 2024–present) ===
Swinney became party leader on 6 May 2024 and subsequently became First Minister of Scotland on 8 May.

On 6 May 2024, John Swinney was confirmed as the new leader of the Scottish National Party in the 2024 Scottish National Party leadership election. He was unopposed in the race as on 2 May his main speculated challenger, Kate Forbes, announced she would not stand in the race and endorsed Swinney. Further, on 5 May, Graeme McCormick claimed that he secured enough member votes for a nomination. However, he dropped out the same evening following a conversation with Swinney; he ultimately endorsed Swinney.

During the campaign for the 2024 general election, the SNP was investigated by Holyrood authorities for allegedly misusing MSPs' expenses to fund their campaigning. An anonymous complaint was sent to Alison Johnstone in which an individual claimed that stamps bought with expenses were given to Westminster election candidates for mailing leaflets. The complaint included a WhatsApp screenshot showing MSP staff discussing the traceability of the stamps. Parliamentary rules state that stationery and postage provided by the Scottish Parliament Corporate Body "must be used only for parliamentary duties and must not be used for any other purpose, including party political purposes". It was reported that John Swinney's office manager had told an SNP staff WhatsApp group chat that "stamp fairy is very useful when it comes to campaigns". An SNP spokesperson confirmed the investigation and emphasized compliance with the rules, while John Swinney stated that he had been "assured that no parliamentary stamps that have been provided by Parliament have been used to support election purposes", adding that he was "confident" that there had been no use of any public money to support the SNP general election campaign. This investigation occurred amid SNP's financial struggles, falling membership, and the police investigation into alleged embezzlement. Despite a £128,000 bequest boosting their campaign, SNP spending was minimal compared to other parties.

The SNP ultimately won nine seats in the 2024 election, a loss of 39 seats on its 2019 result, reducing it to the second-largest party in Scotland, behind Scottish Labour, and the fourth-largest party in Westminster. Swinney took full responsibility but said that he would not resign as leader. He said of the results, "There will have to be a lot of soul searching as a party as a consequence of these results that have come in tonight", and that the SNP has to be "better at governing on behalf of the people of Scotland", admitting the party was not "winning the argument" on Scottish independence.

In November 2024, the SNP announced a plan to reduce permanent paid staff at its headquarters from twenty-six to sixteen, a reduction of more than a third, in order to "protect the long-term finances of the party" before the next Scottish Parliament election. The pressure on the SNP's finances was attributed to a reduction in Short Money they receive following the 2024 general election, along with an increased reliance on membership fees over substantial donations.

At the 2026 Scottish election, the SNP won 58 seats, remaining the largest party in the Scottish Parliament and securing a fifth consecutive term in government under Swinney, despite losing a net total of six seats compared to 2021. The party achieved the largest gap between first and second place in Scottish Parliament election history, finishing 41 seats ahead of Scottish Labour and Reform UK who both tied on 17 seats. The SNP received 38.2% of the constituency vote and 27.2% of the regional vote, both down on its 2021 performance.

The SNP also achieved a significant breakthrough in Shetland Islands, winning the constituency for the first time in the party’s history with Hannah Mary Goodlad gaining the seat from the Liberal Democrats with 47% of the vote.

Despite the decline in vote share and seats, parties supporting Scottish independence increased a majority in the Scottish Parliament, with the SNP and Scottish Greens together holding 73 seats, the highest number of pro-independence MSPs elected. Swinney described the result as a mandate for Scotland to retain the option of holding another referendum on Scottish independence.

On 14 September 2026, the SNP along with Plaid Cymru, who support Welsh independence, and Sinn Féin, who support Irish reunification, signed a memorandum of understanding calling for the UK government to "prepare for, plan and facilitate constitutional change" to enable self-determination for each nation.

== Constitution and structure ==
The local Branches are the primary level of organisation in the SNP. All of the Branches within each Scottish Parliament constituency form a Constituency Association, which coordinates the work of the Branches within the constituency, coordinates the activities of the party in the constituency and acts as a point of liaison between an MSP or MP and the party. Constituency Associations are composed of delegates from all of the Branches within the constituency.

The annual National Conference is the supreme governing body of the SNP and is responsible for determining party policy and electing the National Executive Committee. The National Conference is composed of:

- delegates from every Branch and Constituency Association
- the members of the National Executive Committee
- every SNP MSP and MP
- all SNP councillors
- delegates from each of the SNP's Affiliated Organisations (Young Scots for Independence, SNP Students, SNP Trade Union Group, the Association of Nationalist Councillors, the Disabled Members Group, the SNP BAME Network, Scots Asians for Independence, and Out for Independence)

There are also regular meetings of the National Assembly, which provides a forum for detailed discussions of party policy by party members.

=== Membership ===
The SNP experienced a large surge in membership following the 2014 Scottish independence referendum. In 2013, the party's membership stood at just 20,000, but that number had swelled to over 100,000 by 2015. Party membership peaked in 2019 at around 125,000. Annual accounts submitted by the party to the Electoral Commission showed the SNP to have over 119,000 members in 2021. By the end of 2021, the party reported that this number was 103,884. Membership then continued to fall: to 85,000 at the end of 2022, and to 72,186 in March 2023. By the end of 2023, this had fallen to 69,325 and then to 64,525 by June 2024.

=== European affiliation ===
The SNP retains close links with Plaid Cymru, its counterpart in Wales. MPs from both parties co-operate closely with each other and work as a single parliamentary group within the House of Commons. Both the SNP and Plaid Cymru are members of the European Free Alliance (EFA), a European political party comprising regionalist political parties. The EFA co-operates with the larger European Green Party to form The Greens–European Free Alliance (Greens/EFA) group in the European Parliament. Before its affiliation with The Greens–European Free Alliance, the SNP had previously been allied with the European Progressive Democrats (1979–1984), Rainbow Group (1989–1994) and European Radical Alliance (1994–1999).

As the UK is no longer a member of the EU, the SNP has no MEPs.

== Policies ==
=== Ideology ===
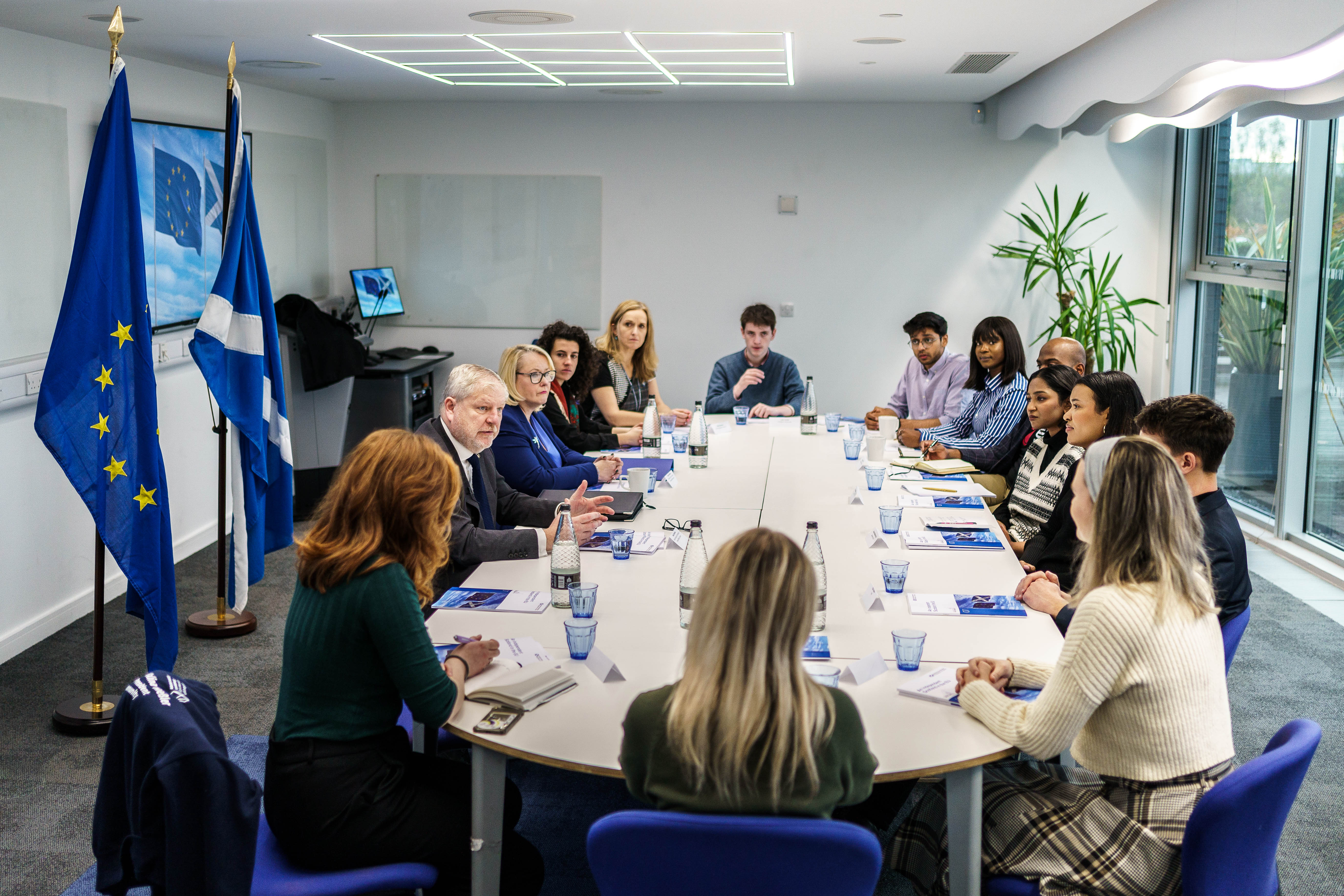
The SNP advocate for Scotland to regain its independence and re–join the European Union.

The Scottish National Party did not have a clear ideological position until the 1970s, when it sought to explicitly present itself as a social democratic party in terms of party policy and publicity. During the period from its foundation until the 1960s, the SNP was essentially a moderate centrist party. Debate within the party focused more on the SNP being distinct as an all-Scotland national movement, with it being neither of the left nor the right, but constituting a new politics that sought to put Scotland first.

The SNP was formed through the merger of the centre-left National Party of Scotland (NPS) and the centre-right Scottish Party. The SNP's founders were united over self-determination in principle, though not its exact nature, or the best strategic means to achieve self-government. From the mid-1940s onwards, SNP policy was radical and redistributionist concerning land and in favour of 'the diffusion of economic power', including the decentralisation of industries such as coal to include the involvement of local authorities and regional planning bodies to control industrial structure and development. Party policies supported the economic and social policy status quo of the post-war welfare state.

By the 1960s, the SNP was starting to become defined ideologically, with a social democratic tradition emerging as the party grew in urban, industrial Scotland, and its membership experienced an influx of social democrats from the Labour Party, the trade unions and the Campaign for Nuclear Disarmament. The emergence of Billy Wolfe as a leading figure in the SNP also contributed to the leftwards shift. By this period, the Labour Party was also the dominant party in Scotland, in terms of electoral support and representation. Targeting Labour through emphasising left-of-centre policies and values was therefore electorally logical for the SNP, as well as tying in with the ideological preferences of many new party members. In 1961, the SNP conference expressed the party's opposition to the siting of the US Polaris submarine base at the Holy Loch. This policy was followed in 1963 by a motion opposed to nuclear weapons: a policy that has remained in place ever since. The 1964 policy document, SNP & You, contained a clear centre-left policy platform, including commitments to full employment, government intervention in fuel, power and transport, a state bank to guide economic development, encouragement of cooperatives and credit unions, extensive building of council houses (social housing) by central and local government, pensions adjusted to cost of living, a minimum wage and an improved national health service.

The 1960s also saw the beginnings of the SNP's efforts to establish an industrial organisation and mobilise amongst trade unionists in Scotland, with the establishment of the SNP Trade Union Group, and identifying the SNP with industrial campaigns, such as the Upper-Clyde Shipbuilders Work-in and the attempt of the workers at the Scottish Daily Express to run as a co-operative. For the party manifestos for the two 1974 general elections, the SNP finally self-identified as a social democratic party, and proposed a range of social democratic policies. There was also an unsuccessful proposal at the 1975 party conference to rename the party as the Scottish National Party (Social Democrats). In the UK-wide referendum on Britain's membership of the European Economic Community (EEC) in the same year as the aforementioned attempted name change, the SNP campaigned for Britain to leave the EEC.

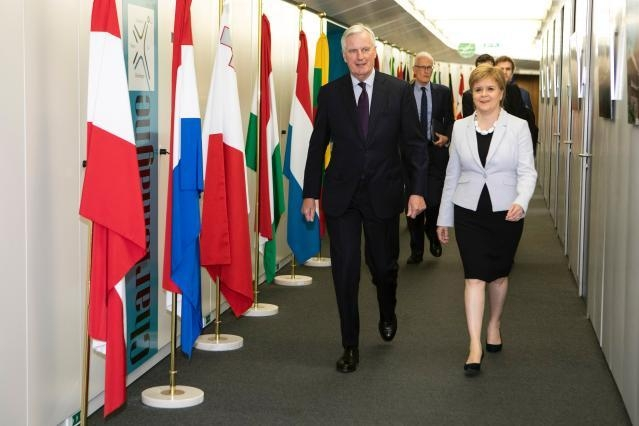
Sturgeon meets with Michel Barnier from the European Commission, 2019

There were further ideological and internal struggles after 1979, with the 79 Group attempting to move the SNP further to the left, away from being what could be described a "social-democratic" party, to an expressly "socialist" party. Members of the 79 Group – including future party leader and First Minister Alex Salmond – were expelled from the party. This produced a response in the shape of the Campaign for Nationalism in Scotland from those who wanted the SNP to remain a "broad church", apart from arguments of left vs. right. The 1980s saw the SNP further define itself as a party of the political left, such as campaigning against the introduction of the poll tax in Scotland in 1989; one year before the tax was imposed on the rest of the UK.

Ideological tensions inside the SNP are further complicated by arguments between the so-called SNP gradualists and SNP fundamentalists. In essence, gradualists seek to advance Scotland to independence through further devolution, in a "step-by-step" strategy. They tend to be in the moderate left grouping, though much of the 79 Group was gradualist in approach. However, this 79 Group gradualism was as much a reaction against the fundamentalists of the day, many of whom believed the SNP should not take a clear left or right position.

=== Economy ===
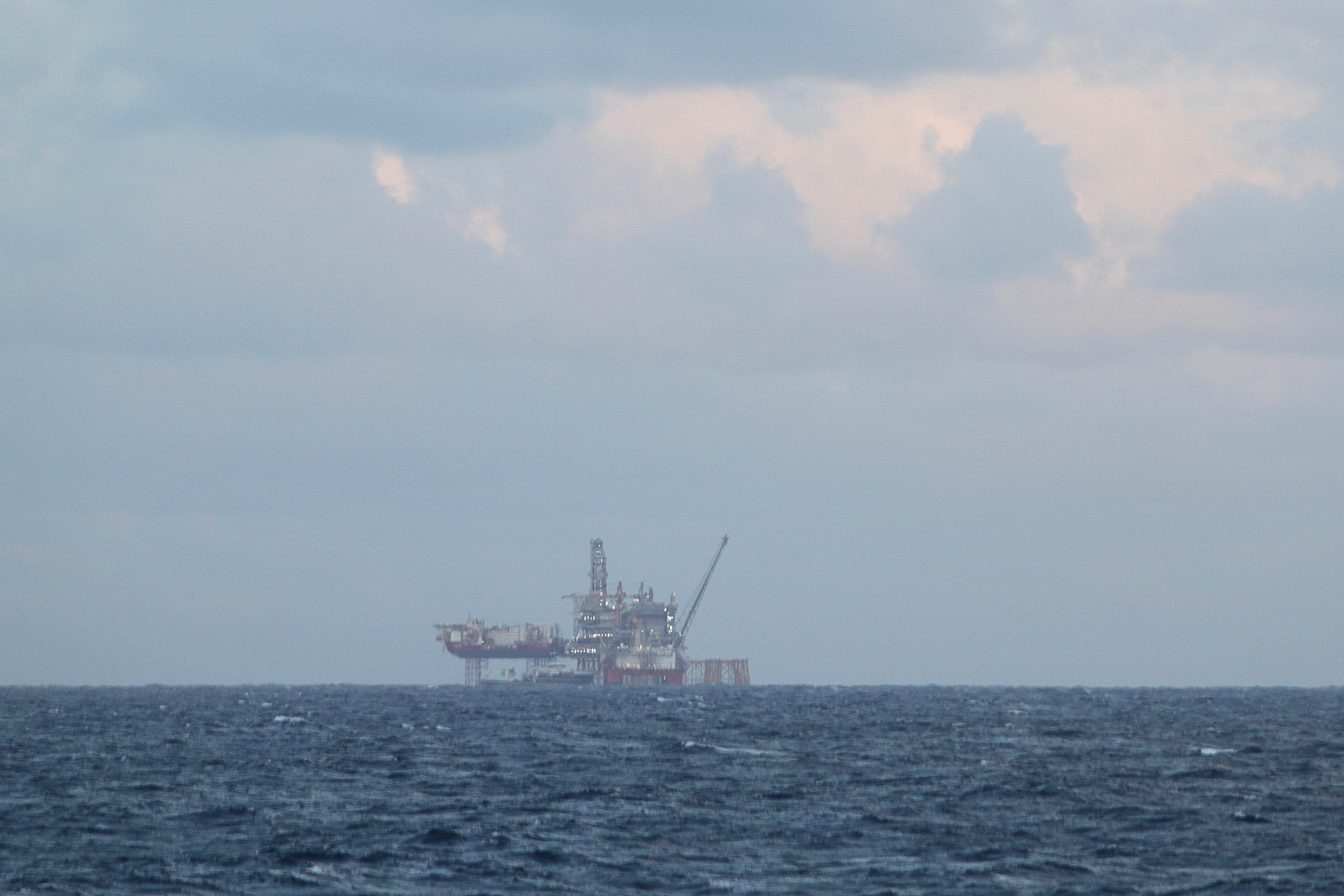
Following oil discovery in the North Sea of the coast of Scotland, the SNP used the campaign slogan It's Scotland's oil.

During the 1970s the SNP campaigned widely on the political slogan It's Scotland's oil, where it was argued that the discovery of North Sea oil off the coast of Scotland, and the revenue that it created would not benefit Scotland to any significant degree while Scotland remained part of the United Kingdom.

The Sturgeon Government in 2017 adjusted income tax rates so that low earners would pay less and those earning more than £33,000 a year would pay more. Previously the party had replaced the flat rate Stamp Duty with the LBTT, which uses a graduated tax rate. Whilst in government, the party was also responsible for the establishment of Revenue Scotland to administer devolved taxation.

Having previously defined itself in opposition to the poll tax the SNP has also championed progressive taxation at a local level. Despite pledging to introduce a local income tax the Salmond Government found itself unable to replace the council tax and the party has, particularly since the ending of the council tax freeze under Nicola Sturgeon's leadership, committing to increasing the graduated nature of the tax. Conversely, the party has also supported capping and reducing Business Rates in an attempt to support small businesses.

It has been noted that the party contains a broader spectrum of opinion regarding economic policy than most political parties in the UK due to its status as "the only viable vehicle for Scottish independence", with the party's parliamentary group at Westminster in 2016 including socialists such as Tommy Sheppard and Mhairi Black, capitalists such as Stewart Hosie and former Conservative, Tasmina Ahmed-Sheikh.

=== Social justice ===
In 1980, when Robin Cook moved an amendment to legalise homosexual acts to the Bill which became the Criminal Justice (Scotland) Act 1980, the SNP's two MPs Gordon Wilson and Donald Stewart both voted against the amendment. In June 2000, the SNP supported the repeal of Section 28, a series of laws across Britain that prohibited the "promotion of homosexuality" by local authorities. In government in July 2012, the SNP announced that they would legislate for civil and religious same-sex marriage in Scotland. The bill was fast-tracked through the Scottish Parliament, and approved with 105 MSPs in favour in February 2014. Under Sturgeon's leadership, Scotland was twice in succession named the best country in Europe for LGBT+ legal equality. The party is considered very supportive of gays, lesbians and bisexuals – something that historically was not the case, as stated above.

The SNP legislated to improve gender self-identification with the Gender Recognition Reform (Scotland) Bill. The policy was controversial within the SNP, with some of the party's social conservatives claiming the reforms could be open to abuse. In 2020, the Scottish Government paused the legislation in order to find "maximum consensus" on the issue and commentators described the issue as having divided the SNP like no other, with many dubbing the debate a "civil war". In January 2021, a former trans officer in the SNP's LGBT wing, Teddy Hope, quit the party, describing it was one of the "core hubs of transphobia in Scotland". Large numbers of LGBT activists followed suit and Sturgeon released a video message in which she said that transphobia is "not acceptable" and that she hoped they would one day rejoin the party. In December 2022, the Gender Recognition Reform (Scotland) Bill was passed by a majority of 86 to 39, with nine SNP members voting against the bill and 54 for.

Particularly since Nicola Sturgeon's elevation to First Minister the party has highlighted its commitments to gender equality – with her first act being to appoint a gender balanced cabinet. The SNP have also taken steps to implement all-women shortlists whilst Sturgeon has introduced a mentoring scheme to encourage women's political engagement. The SNP supports multiculturalism with Scotland receiving thousands of refugees from the Syrian Civil War. To this end it has been claimed that refugees in Scotland are better supported than those in England. More generally, the SNP seeks to increase immigration to combat a declining population and calling for a separate Scottish visa even within the UK. However, data for 2022 shows that Scotland houses proportionally fewer asylum seekers relative to its population than England.

=== Foreign affairs and defence ===
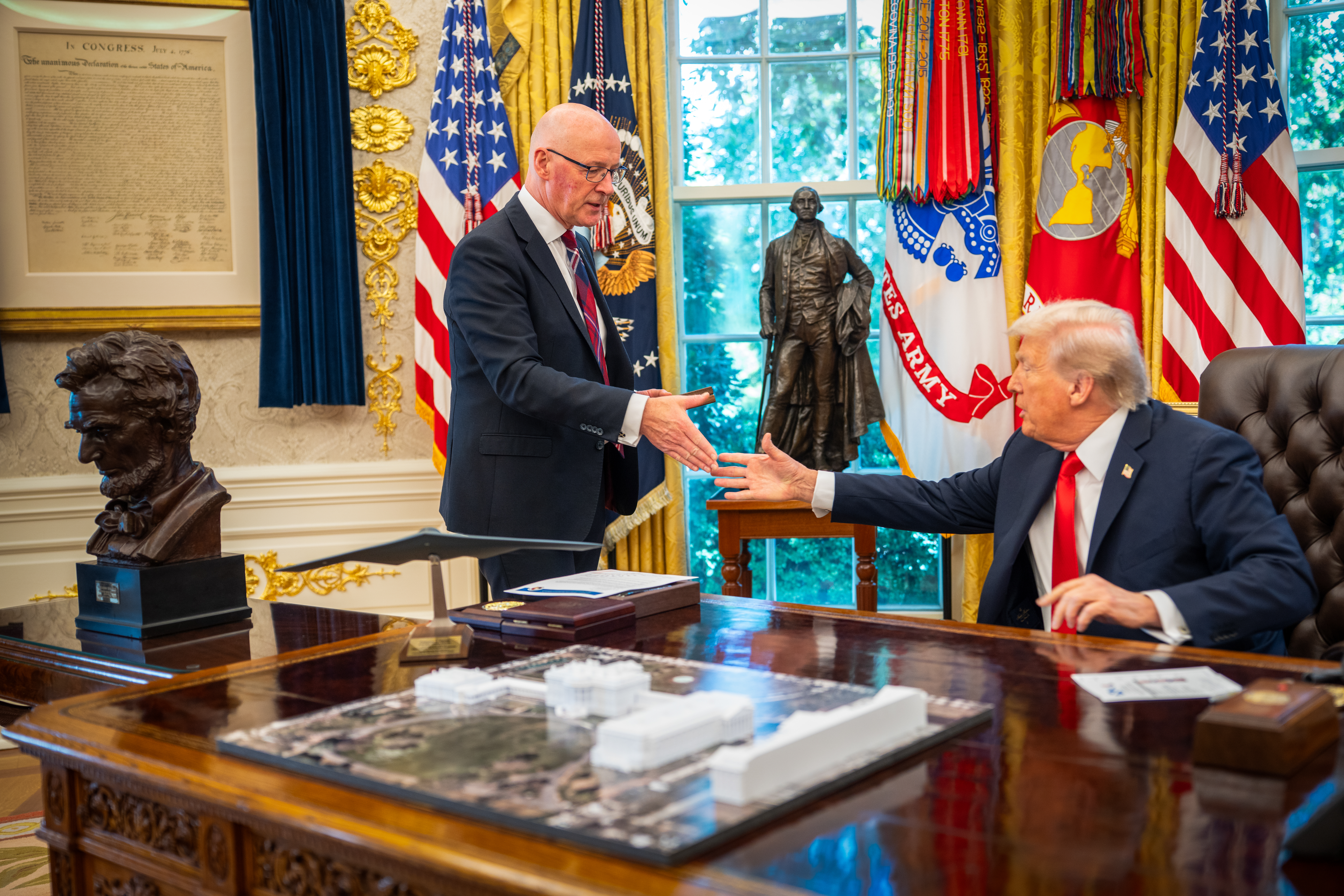
First Minister Swinney with U.S. President Donald Trump. The SNP increasingly supports Atlanticist institutions like NATO.

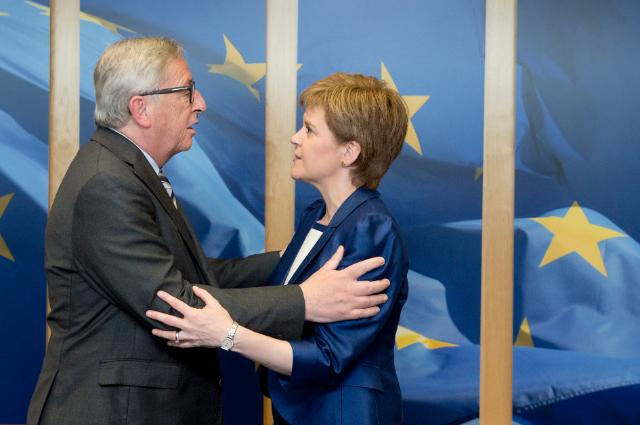
Sturgeon meeting the president of the European Commission Jean-Claude Juncker in 2017. Pro-Europeanism has been central to the SNP.

Despite traditionally supporting military neutrality the SNP's policy has in recent years moved to support both the Atlanticist and Europeanist traditions. This is particularly evident in the conclusion of the NATO debate within the party in favour of those who support membership of the military alliance. This is despite the party's continuing opposition to Scotland hosting nuclear weapons and then-leader Salmond's criticism of both the Kosovo intervention and the Iraq War. The party has placed an emphasis on developing positive relations with the United States in recent years despite a lukewarm reaction to the election of part-Scottish American Donald Trump as President due to long running legal disputes.

Having opposed continued membership in the 1975 referendum, the party has supported membership of the European Union since the adoption of the Independence in Europe policy during the 1980s. Consequentially, the SNP supported remaining within the EU during the 2016 referendum where every Scottish council area backed this position. Consequently, the party opposed Brexit and sought a further referendum on the withdrawal agreement, ultimately unsuccessfully. The SNP would like to see an independent Scotland as a member of the European Union and NATO and has left open the prospect of an independent Scotland joining the euro.

The SNP has also taken a stance against Russian interference abroad – the party supporting the enlargement of the EU and NATO to areas such as the Western Balkans and Ukraine to counter this influence. The party called for repercussions for Russia regarding the poisoning of Sergei and Yulia Skripal and has criticised former leader Alex Salmond for broadcasting a chat show on Kremlin-backed network RT. Elsewhere in Europe, the SNP support the independence movement in Catalonia which seeks to establish Catalonia as an independent country from Spain. Consequently, this resulted in hostilities between both the Scottish Government and Spanish Government, particularly from Prime Minister of Spain Mariano Rajoy, who frequently claimed that Scotland would be required to reapply for membership of the European Union should it become independent. These claims were subsequently rejected by the SNP.

The party have supported measures including foreign aid which seek to facilitate international development through various charitable organisations. In recognition of Scotland's historic links to the country, these programmes are mostly focused in Malawi in common with previous Scottish governments. With local authorities across the country, including Glasgow City Council being involved in this partnership since before the SNP took office in 2007.

=== Health and education ===
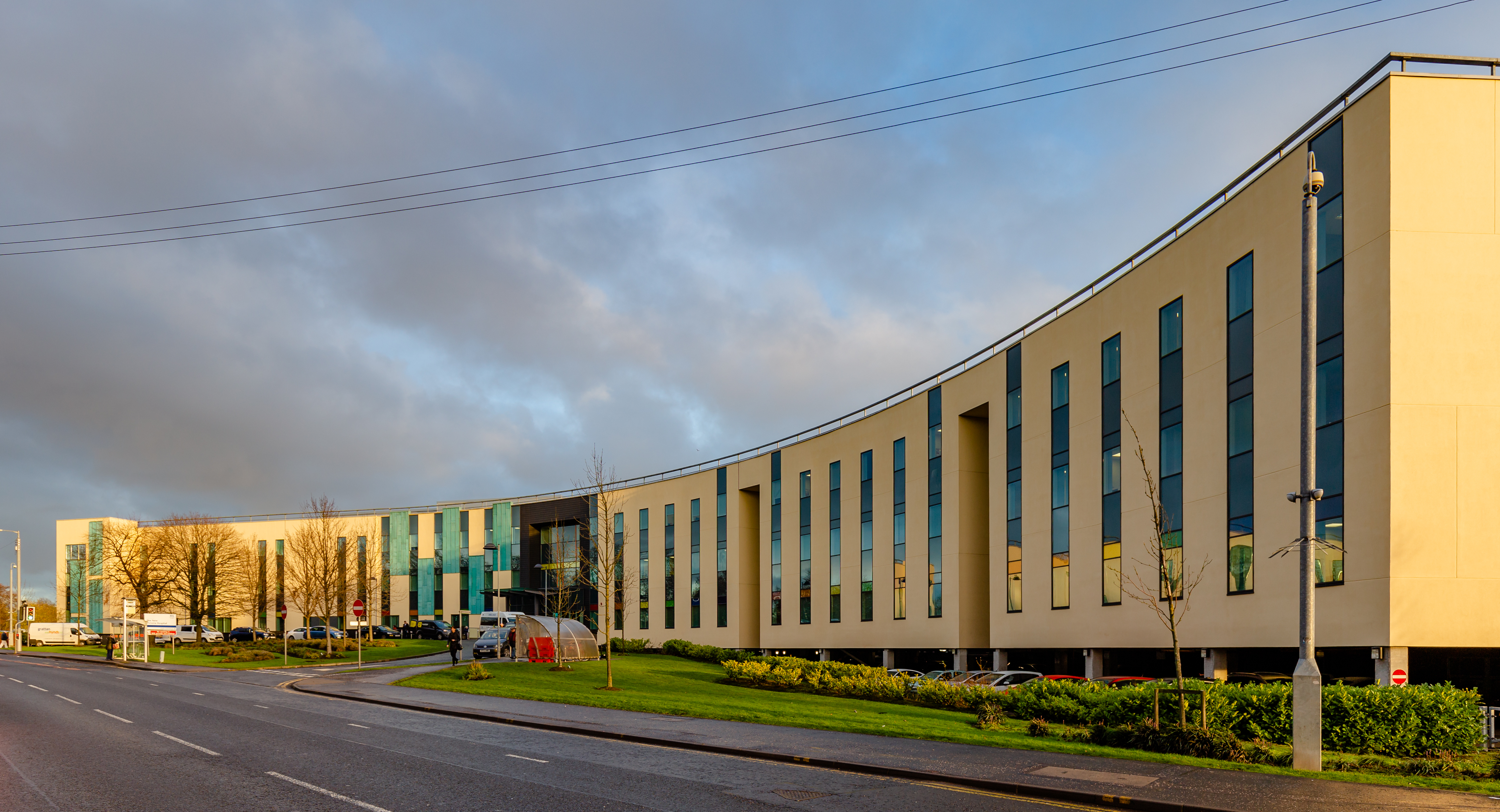
The SNP abolished parking charges at hospitals including the Victoria Hospital in Glasgow.

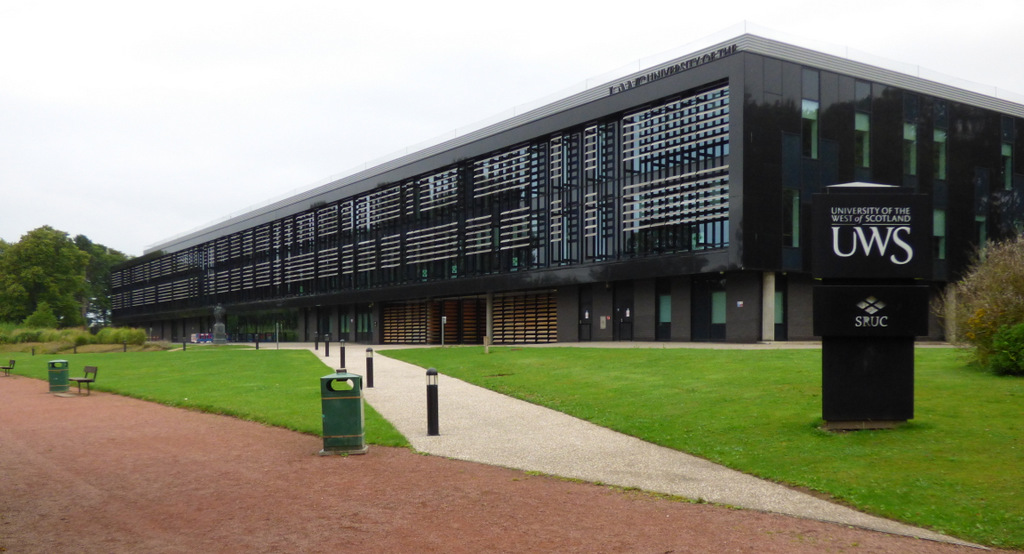
University tuition fees were abolished under Alex Salmond.

The SNP have pledged to uphold the public service nature of NHS Scotland and are consequently opposed to any attempts at privatisation of the health service, including any inclusion in a post-Brexit trade deal with the United States. The party has been fond of increasing provision under the NHS with the introduction of universal baby boxes based on the Finnish scheme. This supported child development alongside other commitments including the expansion of free childcare for children younger than school age and the introduction of universal free school meals in the first three years of school.

Previously, SNP governments have abolished hospital parking charges as well as prescription charges in efforts to promote enhanced public health outcomes by increasing access to care and treatment. Furthermore, during Sturgeon's premiership, Scotland became the first country in the world to introduce alcohol minimum unit pricing to counter alcohol problems. Recently, the party has also committed to providing universal access to sanitary products and the liberalisation of drugs policy through devolution, in an effort to increase access to treatment and improve public health outcomes. Between 2014 and 2019 the party slashed the budget for drug and alcohol treatments by 6.3% – a cut that has been linked with Scotland recording the highest number of drug deaths per head in Europe.

The party aspires to promote universal access to education, with one of the first acts of the Salmond government being to abolish tuition fees – although it has also introduced a cap on the number of Scots who can attend university and cut funding for further education colleges. More recently, the party has turned its attention to widening access to higher education with Nicola Sturgeon stating that education is her number one priority. At school level, the SNP had the OECD review the Curriculum for Excellence. When the review found that the "visionary ideals" of Curriculum for Excellence (CfE) had not fully succeeded, they announced a series of educational reforms and the scrapping of the Scottish Qualifications Authority. Furthermore, it has been claimed that a recent decline in Scotland's educational standards as illustrated by PISA studies is directly related to CfE's implementation in 2012.

=== Constitution ===
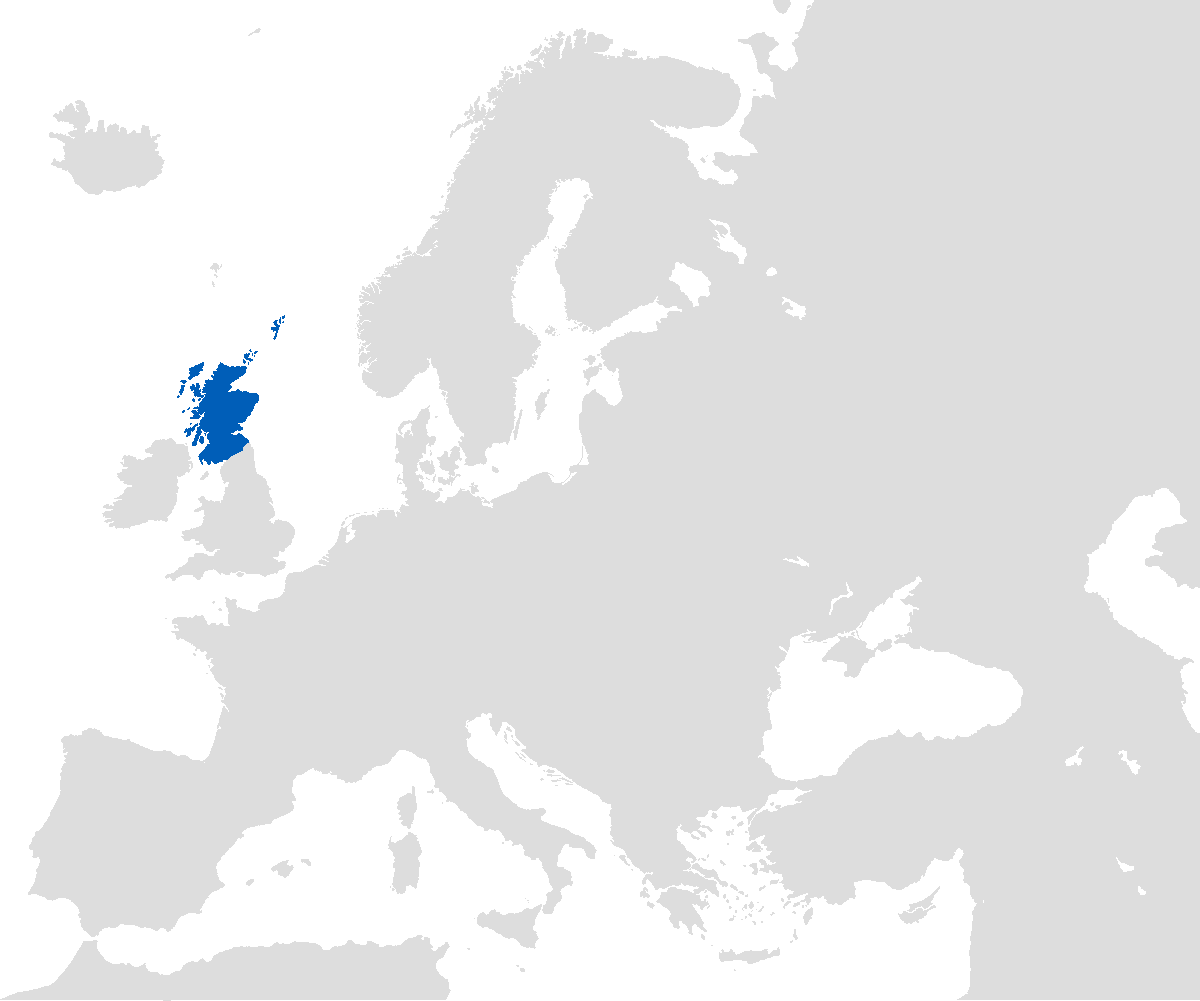
Scotland (in blue) within Europe (grey)

The foundations of the SNP are a belief that Scotland would be more prosperous by being governed independently from the United Kingdom, although the party was defeated in the 2014 referendum on this issue. The party has since sought to hold a second referendum at some point in the future, perhaps related to the outcome of Brexit, as the party sees a referendum as the only route to independence. In 2016 the party convened the Sustainable Growth Commission to advise on the economy and currency of an independent Scotland. Although the Sustainable Growth Commission's report, published in 2018, divides opinion it contains the party's official economic recommendations in the event of independence. The party is constitutionalist and as such rejects holding such a referendum unilaterally or any course of actions that could lead to comparisons with cases such as Catalonia with the party seeing independence as a process that should be undertaken through a consensual process alongside the UK Government. As part of this process towards independence, the party supports increased devolution to the Scottish Parliament and the Scottish Government, particularly in areas such as welfare and immigration.

Official SNP policy is supportive of the monarchy. Many party members are republicans including former party leader Humza Yousaf but his predecessor, Nicola Sturgeon, believes it is a "model with many merits", although she has proposed reducing the funds spent on the royal family. Separately, the SNP has always opposed the UK's unelected House of Lords and would like to see both it and the House of Commons elected by a form of proportional representation. The party also supports the introduction of a codified constitution, either for an independent Scotland or the UK as a whole, going as far as producing a proposed interim constitution for Scotland during the independence referendum campaign.

==== Fundamentalists and gradualists ====
There have always been divisions within the party on how to achieve Scottish independence, with one wing described as 'fundamentalists' and the other 'gradualists'. The SNP leadership generally subscribes to the gradualist viewpoint, that independence can be won by the accumulation over time by the Scottish Parliament of powers that the UK Parliament currently has. Fundamentalism holds that the SNP should emphasise independence more widely to achieve it. It is argued that if the SNP is unprepared to argue for its central policy then it is unlikely ever to persuade the public of its worthiness.

== Leadership ==
=== Leader of the Scottish National Party ===
Leader of the Scottish National Party
Leader (birth-death)	Portrait	Political office	Took office	Left office
Alexander MacEwen (1875–1941)		Provost of Inverness (1925–1931); Inverness town councillor (1908–1931); Inverness-shire county councillor for Benbecula (1931–1941); Candidate for Western Isles (1935) former member, Liberal Party founding member, Scottish Party	7 April 1934	1936
Prof Andrew Dewar Gibb (1888–1974)		Candidate for Combined Scottish Universities (1936, 1938) former member, Unionist Party; Scottish Party	1936	1940
William Power (1873–1951)		Candidate for Argyllshire (1940)	1940	30 May 1942
Douglas Young (1913–1973)		Candidate for Kirkcaldy Burghs (1944)	30 May 1942	9 June 1945
Prof Bruce Watson (1910–1988)			9 June 1945	May 1947
Robert McIntyre (1913–1998)		MP for Motherwell (1945); Provost of Stirling (1967–1975); Stirling Burgh Councillor (1956–1975) former member, Labour Party	May 1947	June 1956
James Halliday (1927–2013)		Candidate for Stirling and Falkirk (1955 and 1959); Candidate for West Fife (1970)	June 1956	5 June 1960
Arthur Donaldson (1901–1993)		Angus County Councillor (1946–1955); Forfar town councillor (1945–1968) former member, National Party of Scotland	5 June 1960	1 June 1969
William Wolfe (1924–2010)		Candidate for West Lothian (1970–79)	1 June 1969	15 September 1979
Gordon Wilson (1938–2017)		MP for Dundee East (1974–1987)	15 September 1979	22 September 1990
Alex Salmond (1954–2024) (1st Term)		MP for Banff and Buchan (1987–2010); MSP for Banff and Buchan (1999–2001)	22 September 1990	26 September 2000
John Swinney (born 1964) (1st Term)		MP for North Tayside (1997–2001)	26 September 2000	3 September 2004
Alex Salmond (1954–2024) (2nd Term)		First Minister (2007–2014); MSP for Aberdeenshire East (2011–2016); MSP for Gordon (2007–2011); MP for Gordon (2015–2017)	3 September 2004	14 November 2014
Nicola Sturgeon (born 1970)		First Minister (2014–2023); Deputy first minister (2007–2014); MSP for Glasgow Southside (2011–2026); MSP for Glasgow Govan (2007–2011); MSP for Glasgow (1999–2007)	14 November 2014	27 March 2023
Humza Yousaf (born 1985)		First Minister (2023–2024); MSP for Glasgow Pollok (2016-2026); MSP for Glasgow (2011–2016)	27 March 2023	6 May 2024
John Swinney (born 1964) (2nd Term)		First Minister (2024–present); Deputy first minister (2014–2023); MSP for Perthshire North (since 2011); MSP for North Tayside (1999–2011); MP for North Tayside (1997–2001)	6 May 2024	Incumbent

=== Depute leader of the Scottish National Party ===
Depute Leader of the Scottish National Party
Depute leader (birth-death)	Portrait	Political office	Took office	Left office
Sandy Milne (1920–1984)		Councillor for Stirling (1950s)	17 May 1964	5 June 1966
William Wolfe (1924–2010)		Candidate for West Lothian (1966)	5 June 1966	1 June 1969
George Leslie (1936–2023)		Councillor for Calderwood/St Leonards (1974–1978)	1 June 1969	30 May 1971
Douglas Henderson (1935–2006) (1st Term)		MP for East Aberdeenshire (1974–1979)	30 May 1971	3 June 1973
Gordon Wilson (1938–2017)		MP for Dundee East (1974–1987)	3 June 1973	2 June 1974
Margo MacDonald (1943–2014)		MSP for Lothian (1999–2014); MP for Glasgow Govan (1973–1974)	2 June 1974	15 September 1979
Douglas Henderson (1935–2006) (2nd Term)		MP for East Aberdeenshire (1974–1979)	15 September 1979	30 May 1981
Jim Fairlie (born 1940)		Candidate for Dunfermline West (1983)	30 May 1981	15 September 1984
Margaret Ewing (1945–2006)		MSP for Moray (1999–2006); MP for Moray (1987–2001); MP for East Dunbartonshire (1974–1979)	15 September 1984	26 September 1987
Alex Salmond (1954–2024)		MP for Banff and Buchan (1987–2010)	26 September 1987	22 September 1990
Alasdair Morgan (born 1945)		MSP for South of Scotland (2003–2011); MSP for Galloway and Upper Nithsdale (1999–2003); MP for Galloway and Upper Nithsdale (1997–2001)	22 September 1990	22 September 1991
Jim Sillars (born 1937)		MP for Glasgow Govan (1988–1992); MP for South Ayrshire (1970–1979)	22 September 1991	25 September 1992
Allan Macartney (1941–1998)		MEP for North East Scotland (1994–1998)	25 September 1992	25 August 1998
John Swinney (born 1964)		MSP for Perthshire North (since 2011); MSP for North Tayside (1999–2011); MP for North Tayside (1997–2001)	25 August 1998	26 September 2000
Roseanna Cunningham (born 1951)		MSP for Perthshire South and Kinross-shire (2011–2021); MSP for Perth (1999–2011); MP for Perth (1997–2001); MP for Perth and Kinross (1995–1997)	26 September 2000	3 September 2004
Nicola Sturgeon (born 1970)		Deputy First Minister (2007–2014); MSP for Glasgow Southside (2011–2026); MSP for Glasgow Govan (2007–2011); MSP for Glasgow (1999–2007)	3 September 2004	14 November 2014
Stewart Hosie (born 1963)		MP for Dundee East (2005–2024)	14 November 2014	13 October 2016
Angus Robertson (born 1969)		MSP for Edinburgh Central (since 2021); MP for Moray (2001–2017)	13 October 2016	3 February 2018
Keith Brown (born 1961)		MSP for Clackmannanshire and Dunblane (since 2011); MSP for Ochil (2007–2011); Leader of Clackmannanshire Council (1999–2003); Councillor for Alva (1996–2007)	8 June 2018	Incumbent

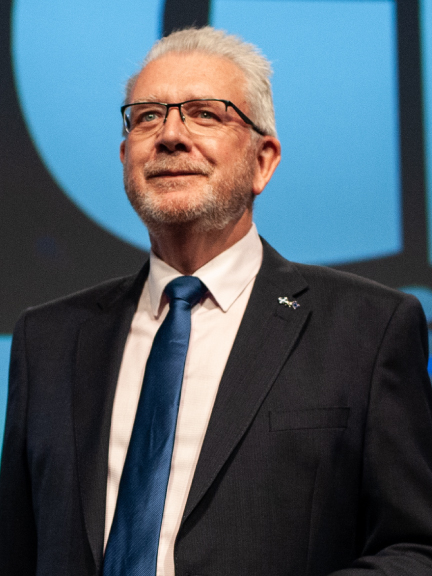
Mike Russell, the most recent President of the Scottish National Party

=== President of the Scottish National Party ===
- James Graham, 6th Duke of Montrose 1934–1936
- Roland Muirhead, 1936–1950
- Tom Gibson, 1950–1958
- Robert McIntyre, 1958–1980
- William Wolfe, 1980–1982
- Donald Stewart, 1982–1987
- Winnie Ewing, 1987–2005
- Ian Hudghton, 2005–2020
- Michael Russell, 2020–2023
- Maureen Watt, 2024–present

=== National Secretary of the Scottish National Party ===
- John MacCormick, 1934–1942
- Robert McIntyre, 1942–1947
- Mary Fraser Dott, 1947–1951
- Robert Curran, 1951–1954
- John Smart, 1954–1963
- Malcolm Shaw, 1963–1964
- Gordon Wilson, 1964–1971
- Muriel Gibson, 1971–1972
- Rosemary Hall, 1972–1975
- Muriel Gibson, 1975–1977
- Chrissie MacWhirter, 1977–1979
- Iain Murray, 1979–1981
- Neil MacCallum, 1981–1986
- John Swinney, 1986–1992
- Alasdair Morgan, 1992–1997
- Stewart Hosie, 1999–2003
- Alasdair Allan, 2003–2006
- Duncan Ross, 2006–2009
- William Henderson, 2009–2012
- Patrick Grady, 2012–2016
- Angus MacLeod, 2016–2020
- Stewart Stevenson, 2020–2021
- Lorna Finn, 2021–2024
- Alex Kerr, 2024–present

=== Leader of the parliamentary party, Scottish Parliament ===
- Alex Salmond (Banff and Buchan), 1999–2000
- John Swinney (North Tayside), 2000–2004
- Nicola Sturgeon (Glasgow). 2004–2007
- Alex Salmond (Aberdeenshire East), 2007–2014
- Nicola Sturgeon (Glasgow Southside), 2014–2023
- Humza Yousaf (Glasgow Pollok), 2023–2024
- John Swinney (Perthshire North), 2024–present

=== Deputy Leader of the parliamentary party, Scottish Parliament ===
- John Swinney (North Tayside), 1999–2000
- Roseanna Cunningham (Perth, 2000–2004
- Kenny MacAskill (Lothians), 2004–2007
- Nicola Sturgeon (Glasgow Govan) ('07-'11),(Glasgow Southside)('11-14), 2007–2014
- John Swinney (Perthshire North), 2014–2023
- Shona Robison (Dundee City East), 2023–2024
- Kate Forbes (Skye, Lochaber and Badenoch), 2024–2026
- Jenny Gilruth (Mid Fife and Glenrothes), 2026–

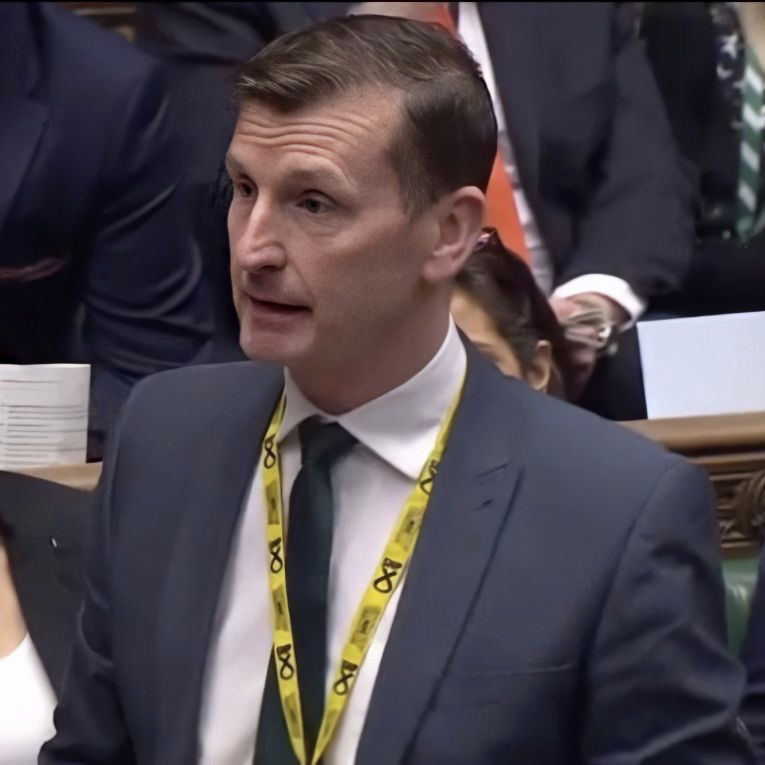
Dave Doogan, SNP Westminster Leader

=== Leader of the parliamentary party, House of Commons ===
- Donald Stewart (Western Isles), 1974–1987
- Margaret Ewing (Moray), 1987–1999
- Alasdair Morgan (Galloway and Upper Nithsdale), 1999–2001
- Alex Salmond (Banff and Buchan), 2001–2007
- Angus Robertson (Moray), 2007–2017
- Ian Blackford (Ross, Skye and Lochaber), 2017–2022
- Stephen Flynn (Aberdeen South), 2022–2026
- Dave Doogan (Angus and Perthshire Glens), 2026–present

=== Deputy Leader of the parliamentary party, House of Commons ===
- Stewart Hosie (Dundee East) 2015–2017
- Kirsty Blackman (Aberdeen North) 2017–2020
- Kirsten Oswald (East Renfrewshire) 2020–2022
- Mhairi Black (Paisley and Renfrewshire South) 2022–2024
- Pete Wishart (Perth and North Perthshire) 2024–present

=== Chief Executive ===
- Michael Russell, 1994–1999
- Vacant 1999–2001
- Peter Murrell, 2001–2023
- Michael Russell, 18–27 March 2023
- Murray Foote, 2023–2024
- Carol Beattie, 2024–2025
- Callum McCaig, 2025–present

=== Current SNP Council Leaders ===
- Clackmannanshire: Ellen Forson (Clackmannanshire South), since 2018
- Dundee City: Mark Flynn (Coldside), since 2024
- East Ayrshire: Douglas Reid (Kilmarnock West and Crosshouse), since 2007
- Falkirk: Cecil Meiklejohn (Falkirk North), since 2017
- Glasgow City: Susan Aitken (Langside), since 2017
- Renfrewshire: Iain Nicolson (Erskine and Inchinnan), since 2017

== Scottish Parliament ==
=== Members of the Scottish Parliament ===
The SNP has formed the Scottish Government since 2007. As of May 2026, the Cabinet of the Scottish Government is as follows:

Portfolio	Portrait	Minister	Term
First Minister		John Swinney MSP	8 May 2024–present
Cabinet secretaries
Deputy First Minister		Jenny Gilruth MSP	20 May 2026–present
Cabinet Secretary for Finance and Local Government		Jenny Gilruth MSP	20 May 2026–present
Cabinet Secretary for Health and Care		Angela Constance MSP	20 May 2026–present
Cabinet Secretary for Economy, Transport and Tourism		Stephen Flynn MSP	21 May 2026–present
Cabinet Secretary for Climate Action and Rural Affairs		Gillian Martin MSP	11 July 2025–present
Cabinet Secretary for Education, Culture and Gaelic		Màiri McAllan MSP	20 May 2026–present
Cabinet Secretary for Public Service Reform		Ivan McKee MSP	21 May 2026–present
Cabinet Secretary for Social Justice and Housing		Shirley-Anne Somerville MSP	20 May 2026–present
Cabinet Secretary for Justice		Neil Gray MSP	20 May 2026–present
Also attending cabinet meetings
Minister for Parliamentary Business & Veterans		Jamie Hepburn	20 May 2026–present
Lord Advocate		Dorothy Bain	19 June 2026–present

== List of Junior Ministers ==
Junior ministers
Post	Minister	Term
Minister for Parliamentary Business & Veterans	Jamie Hepburn MSP	2026–present
Minister for Europe, External Affairs and Energy	Stephen Gethins MSP	2026–present
Minister for Public Finance	Hannah Mary Goodlad MSP	2026–present
Minister for Victims and Community Safety	Kirsten Oswald MSP	2026–present
Minister for Community Care	Alison Thewliss MSP	2026–present
Minister for Mental Wellbeing, Public Health, Sport, Alcohol & Drugs	Maree Todd MSP	2025–present
Minister for Agriculture, Marine and the Islands	Jim Fairlie MSP	2024–present
Minister for Children, Young People and the Promise	Siobhian Brown MSP	2026–present
Minister for Innovation, Technology & Tertiary Education	Alyn Smith MSP	2025–present
Minister for Equalities and International Development	Simita Kumar MSP	2026–present
Minister for Business and Fair Work	Tom Arthur MSP	2026–present

== Parliament of the United Kingdom ==
=== Members of Parliament ===
Following the 2024 general election, the SNP holds nine seats in the House of Commons. The SNP frontbench team in the House of Commons is as follows.

Frontbench Team of Dave Doogan
Portfolio	Spokesperson
Group Leader	Dave Doogan MP
Deputy Leader	Pete Wishart MP
Chief Whip	Kirsty Blackman MP

== Local government ==
=== Councillors ===
The SNP had 453 councillors in local government elected from the 2022 Scottish local elections.

== Electoral performance ==
=== Scottish Parliament ===
Election	Leader	Constituency			Regional			Total seats	±	Pos.	Government
Election	Leader	Vote	%	Seats	Vote	%	Seats	Total seats	±	Pos.	Government
1999	Alex Salmond	672,768	28.7	7 / 73	638,644	27.3	28 / 56	35 / 129	N/A	2nd	Opposition
2003	John Swinney	455,722	23.7	9 / 73	399,659	20.9	18 / 56	27 / 129	▼8	2nd	Opposition
2007	Alex Salmond	664,227	32.9	21 / 73	633,611	31.0	26 / 56	47 / 129	▲20	▲1st	Minority
2011	Alex Salmond	902,915	45.4	53 / 73	876,421	44.0	16 / 56	69 / 129	▲22	1st	Majority
2016	Nicola Sturgeon	1,059,898	46.5	59 / 73	953,587	41.7	4 / 56	63 / 129	▼6	1st	Minority
2021	Nicola Sturgeon	1,291,204	47.7	62 / 73	1,094,374	40.3	2 / 56	64 / 129	▲1	1st	Minority
2026	John Swinney	877,077	38.2	57 / 73	625,949	27.2	1 / 56	58 / 129	▼6	1st	Minority

=== House of Commons ===
Election	Leader	Scotland			UK	±	Position		Government
Election	Leader	Votes	%	Seats	%	±	(Scotland)	(United Kingdom)	Government
1935	Alexander MacEwen	29,517	1.1	0 / 71	0.2	N/A	Steady	Steady	—N/a
1945	Douglas Young	26,707	1.2	0 / 71	0.1	Steady	Steady	Steady	—N/a
1950	Robert McIntyre	9,708	0.4	0 / 71	0.03	Steady	Steady	Steady	—N/a
1951	Robert McIntyre	7,299	0.3	0 / 71	0.03	Steady	Steady	Steady	—N/a
1955	Robert McIntyre	12,112	0.5	0 / 71	0.1	Steady	Steady	Steady	—N/a
1959	Jimmy Halliday	21,738	0.5	0 / 71	0.1	Steady	Steady	Steady	—N/a
1964	Arthur Donaldson	64,044	2.4	0 / 71	0.2	Steady	Steady	Steady	—N/a
1966	Arthur Donaldson	128,474	5.0	0 / 71	0.5	Steady	Steady	Steady	—N/a
1970	William Wolfe	306,802	11.4	1 / 71	1.1	▲1	▲4th	▲5th	Opposition
Feb 1974	William Wolfe	633,180	21.9	7 / 71	2.0	▲6	▲3rd	▲4th	Opposition
Oct 1974	William Wolfe	839,617	30.4	11 / 71	2.9	▲4	3rd	4th	Opposition
1979	William Wolfe	504,259	17.3	2 / 71	1.6	▼9	▼4th	▼6th	Opposition
1983	Gordon Wilson	331,975	11.7	2 / 72	1.1	Steady	▼5th	▼7th	Opposition
1987	Gordon Wilson	416,473	14.0	3 / 72	1.3	▲1	▲4th	▲5th	Opposition
1992	Alex Salmond	629,564	21.5	3 / 72	1.9	Steady	4th	▼7th	Opposition
1997	Alex Salmond	621,550	22.1	6 / 72	2.0	▲3	▲3rd	▲5th	Opposition
2001	John Swinney	464,314	20.1	5 / 72	1.8	▼1	3rd	5th	Opposition
2005	Alex Salmond	412,267	17.7	6 / 59	1.5	▲1	3rd	5th	Opposition
2010	Alex Salmond	491,386	19.9	6 / 59	1.7	Steady	3rd	5th	Opposition
2015	Nicola Sturgeon	1,454,436	50.0	56 / 59	4.7	▲50	▲1st	▲3rd	Opposition
2017	Nicola Sturgeon	977,568	36.9	35 / 59	3.0	▼21	1st	3rd	Opposition
2019	Nicola Sturgeon	1,242,380	45.0	48 / 59	3.9	▲13	1st	3rd	Opposition
2024	John Swinney	724,758	30.0	9 / 57	2.5	▼39	▼2nd	▼4th	Opposition

=== Local councils ===
The Local Government (Scotland) Act 1973 established a two-tier system of regions and districts (except in the islands, which were given unitary, all-purpose councils). It replaced the counties, burghs, and districts established by the Local Government (Scotland) Act 1947, which were largely based on units of local government dating from the Middle Ages.

District councils					Regional and island councils				
Election	Votes		Seats	Councils	Election	Votes		Seats	Councils
Election	%	Pos.	Seats	Councils	Election	%	Pos.	Seats	Councils
1974	12.4	3rd	62 / 1,158	1 / 53	1974	12.6	3rd	18 / 524	0 / 12
1977	24.2	3rd	170 / 1,158	5 / 53	1978	20.9	3rd	18 / 524	0 / 12
1980	15.5	3rd	54 / 1,158	0 / 53	1982	13.4	▼4th	23 / 524	0 / 12
1984	11.7	▼4th	59 / 1,158	1 / 53	1986	18.2	4th	36 / 524	0 / 12
1988	21.3	▲3rd	113 / 1,158	1 / 53	1990	21.8	▲3rd	42 / 524	0 / 12
1992	24.3	3rd	150 / 1,158	1 / 53	1994	26.8	▲2nd	73 / 453	0 / 12

2022 local election results in Scotland where yellow represents the Scottish National Party

The two-tier system of local government lasted until 1 April 1996 when the Local Government etc. (Scotland) Act 1994 came into effect, abolishing the regions and districts and replacing them with 32 unitary authorities. Elections for the new mainland unitary authorities were first contested in 1995. The Local Governance (Scotland) Act 2004 switched the electoral system for Scottish local elections from first past the post (FPTP) to single transferable vote (STV), beginning in 2007.

Election	Leader	1st Pref Votes		Councillors		Councils		Pos.
Election	Leader	Votes	%	Seats	+/-	Majorities	+/-	Pos.
1995 (Note: The three island regional councils (Orkney, Shetland and the Western Isles) were retained from the previous two-tier system of local government. These councils did not take part in the 1995 election, having held local elections in 1994.)	Alex Salmond	444,918	26.1	181 / 1,155	N/A	3 / 29	N/A	2nd
1999	Alex Salmond	655,299	28.9	201 / 1,222	▲20	1 / 32	▼2	2nd
2003	John Swinney	451,660	24.1	171 / 1,222	▼30	1 / 32	Steady	2nd
2007	Alex Salmond	585,885	29.7	363 / 1,222	▲192	0 / 32	▼1	▲1st
2012	Alex Salmond	503,233	32.3	425 / 1,223	▲62	2 / 32	▲2	1st
2017	Nicola Sturgeon	610,454	32.3	431 / 1,227	▲6	0 / 32	▼2	1st
2022	Nicola Sturgeon	633,252	34.1	453 / 1,226	▲22	1 / 32	▲1	1st

=== Results by council (2022) ===
Council	Votes		Seats	Administration
Council	%	Pos.	Seats	Administration
Aberdeen City	35.0	1st	20 / 45	SNP–Lib Dem
Aberdeenshire	30.8	2nd	21 / 70	Opposition
Angus	38.3	1st	13 / 28	SNP–Independent
Argyll and Bute	31.0	1st	12 / 36	Opposition
Clackmannanshire	39.4	1st	9 / 18	Minority
Dumfries and Galloway	28.2	2nd	11 / 43	SNP–Labour
Dundee City	41.4	1st	15 / 29	Majority
East Ayrshire	37.9	1st	14 / 32	Minority
East Dunbartonshire	30.4	1st	8 / 22	Minority
East Lothian	28.2	▲2nd	7 / 22	Opposition
East Renfrewshire	28.6	▲1st	6 / 18	Opposition
City of Edinburgh	25.9	1st	19 / 63	Opposition
Falkirk	39.7	1st	12 / 30	Minority
Fife	36.9	1st	34 / 75	Opposition
Glasgow City	35.5	1st	37 / 85	Minority
Highland	30.1	▲1st	22 / 74	SNP–Independent
Inverclyde	37.7	2nd	8 / 22	Opposition
Midlothian	37.6	▲1st	8 / 18	Minority
Moray	36.0	▼2nd	8 / 26	Opposition
Na h-Eileanan Siar	21.3	2nd	6 / 29	Opposition
North Ayrshire	36.3	1st	12 / 33	Minority
North Lanarkshire	43.6	1st	36 / 77	Opposition
Orkney	0.0	▲3rd	0 / 21	Opposition
Perth and Kinross	36.6	▲1st	16 / 40	Minority
Renfrewshire	41.7	1st	21 / 43	Minority
Scottish Borders	21.0	2nd	9 / 34	Opposition
Shetland	4.4	▼3rd	1 / 23	Opposition
South Ayrshire	33.4	2nd	9 / 28	Opposition
South Lanarkshire	36.9	1st	27 / 64	Opposition
Stirling	33.3	▲1st	8 / 23	Opposition
West Dunbartonshire	42.5	▼2nd	9 / 22	Opposition
West Lothian	37.9	1st	15 / 33	Opposition

=== European Parliament (1979–2020) ===
The SNP achieved pluralities in all mainland council areas in 2019.

During the United Kingdom's membership of the European Union (1973–2020), Scotland participated in European Parliament elections, held every five years from 1979 until 2019. Elections between 1979 and 1994 were contested under the first past the post (FPTP) electoral system. The European Parliamentary Elections Act 1999 introduced a closed-list party list system method of proportional representation and a single Scotland-wide electoral region, which came into effect in 1999.

Election	Group	Leader	Scotland				Pos.	
Election	Group	Leader	Votes	%	Seats	±	(Scotland)	(United Kingdom)
1979	EPD	William Wolfe	247,836	19.4	1 / 8	N/A	3rd	3rd
1984	EDA	Gordon Wilson	230,594	17.8	1 / 8	Steady	3rd	3rd
1989	RBW	Gordon Wilson	406,686	25.6	1 / 8	Steady	▲2nd	3rd
1994	ERA	Alex Salmond	487,237	32.6	2 / 8	▲1	2nd	▼4th
1999	G-EFA	Alex Salmond	268,528	27.2	2 / 8	Steady	2nd	▼6th
2004	G-EFA	John Swinney	231,505	19.7	2 / 7	Steady	2nd	6th
2009	G-EFA	Alex Salmond	321,007	29.1	2 / 6	Steady	▲1st	▼7th
2014	G-EFA	Alex Salmond	389,503	29.0	2 / 6	Steady	1st	▲5th
2019	G-EFA	Nicola Sturgeon	594,553	37.8	3 / 6	▲1	1st	▼6th

== See also ==
- Bo'ness Branch SNP
- Culture of Scotland
- Politics of Scotland
- Scottish devolution
- Radio Free Scotland
- Scottish Campaign for Nuclear Disarmament
- The National (Scotland)
