= Campaign for Nationalism in Scotland =

The Campaign for Nationalism in Scotland was an internal grouping within the Scottish National Party (SNP) that formed in response to the efforts of the 79 Group within the party. The 79 Group was another internal grouping within the SNP that was attempting to turn the party into an expressly socialist party. The Campaign for Nationalism in Scotland formed itself to try to ensure that the SNP avoided traditional debates of left and right, arguing that the cause of Scottish independence transcended such arguments. It had the support of prominent traditionalists inside the party such as Winnie Ewing who had been a member of parliament in the 1960s and was by this stage a Member of the European Parliament. The group had open constitution to avoid being labelled a splinter group. The Campaign for Nationalism in Scotland group launched at a fringe meeting at the 1982 SNP party conference.

The formation of the Campaign for Nationalism in Scotland group brought the issue of factions within the party to a head. SNP leader Gordon Wilson was determined to end factionalism inside the SNP, and at the party conference of 1982 voted for internal groupings to be banned. Following the decision to proscribe groups, Wilson gave them a three-month dealine to accept the decision- the Campaign immediately ceased. The 79 Group who faded in significance after this decision was taken. However, many of the members of the 79 group were readmitted; further, after a period of many years, they came to lead the party.
