= History of the Scottish National Party =

Aspect of Scottish political history

In Scotland, the Scottish National Party (SNP) is a left social democratic political party which campaigns for Scottish independence. The SNP has controlled Scotland's devolved legislature since the 2007 election as a minority government, and were a majority government from the 2011 election and have been a minority government, since the 2016 election.

== Early years (1934–1960) ==
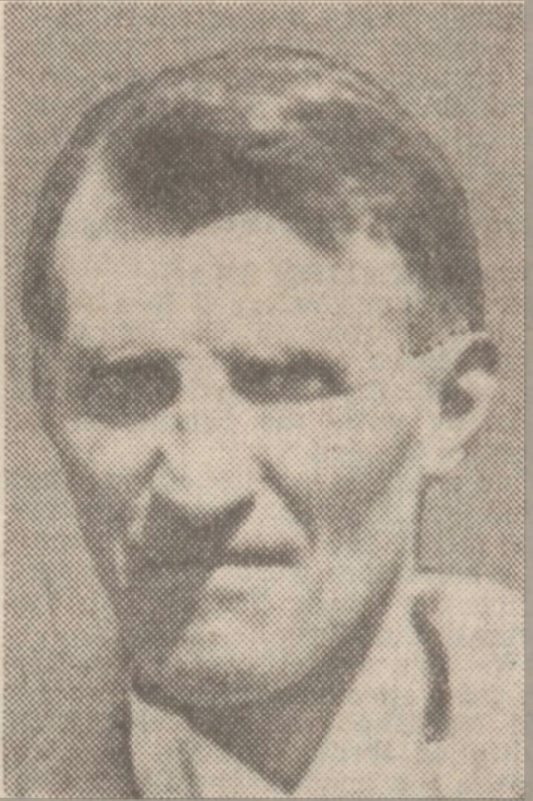
Sir Alexander MacEwen the first leader of the SNP (1934–1936)

The party was founded on 7 April 1934 as the result of a merger between the National Party of Scotland (NPS) and the Scottish Party. Sir Alexander MacEwen became the new party's first leader. The merger was the brainchild of leading NPS figure John MacCormick, who desired unity for the nationalist movement in Scotland, and, upon learning of the Scottish Party's emergence, moved to secure it.

Initially, the SNP did not support all-out independence for Scotland, but rather the establishment of a devolved Scottish Assembly within the United Kingdom. This became the party's initial position on the constitutional status of Scotland as a result of a compromise between the NPS, who did support independence, and the Scottish Party, who were devolutionists. John MacCormick wanted a merger between the two parties and knew that it would only be through the support of devolution rather than independence that the Scottish Party would be persuaded to merge. However, the SNP quickly reverted to the NPS stance of supporting full independence for Scotland.

Professor Douglas Young was the leader of the Scottish National Party from 1942 to 1945. Young fought for the Scottish people to refuse conscription and his activities were popularly vilified as undermining the British war effort against the Nazis. Young was imprisoned for refusing to be conscripted.

John MacCormick left the party in 1942, owing to his failure to change the party's policy from supporting all out independence to Home Rule at that year's SNP conference in Glasgow. McCormick went on to form the Scottish Covenant Association, a non-partisan political organisation campaigning for the establishment of a devolved Scottish Assembly. This Covenant in itself proved politically challenging for the SNP, as it stole their nationalist platform. It also deprived the party of many members, who left with MacCormick.

The Covenant managed to get over 2 million signatures to a petition demanding Home Rule for Scotland in the late 1940s and early 1950s, and secured support from across the parties, but it eventually faded as a political force.

The SNP's early years were characterised by a lack of electoral progress and it wasn't until 1945 that the SNP's first member was elected to the UK parliament at Westminster. The party's first MP was Robert McIntyre who won a by-election for Motherwell under unusual wartime conditions, but he lost the seat in the general election later that year.

McIntyre's brief spell did not particularly galvanise the SNP. The 1950s were characterised by low levels of support, and this made it difficult for the party to advance. Indeed, in most general elections they were unable to put up more than a handful of candidates. The party's former president, Roland Muirhead, devoted much of his time to the Scottish National Congress, a direct action organisation which competed for support with the SNP.

A split occurred in the SNP in 1955 (although not as large as that of 1942) when a grouping styled the 55 Group started an organised campaign of internal dissent. This group was formed mainly of younger SNP members frustrated at the lack of progress of the party. This split proved to be minor and involved only a few members, mainly located in the city of Edinburgh, and the new National Party of Scotland made no impact whatsoever in the long-run.

== The 1960s ==
Despite the poor record the SNP had in the 1950s, by the 1960s, they were beginning to make more impact. They won a significant vote in the 1961 Glasgow Bridgeton by-election, and William Wolfe did well at the 1962 West Lothian by-election. The party began to grow quickly in the 1960s with a rapid growth in the number of recognised branches. For example, in 1966 alone the SNP National Executive recognised 113 new branches of the party. 1967 was the year that the party signalled they could begin to make an impact electorally. The party polled very well at the Pollok by-election, winning some 28% of the votes cast in a constituency where they had never stood before.

Later that year, the SNP scored an even greater electoral success. Winnie Ewing won the Hamilton constituency in a by-election in 1967 with the help of national organizer John McAteer. Consequently, the SNP began to make a serious impact on the political scene. Ewing famously said on the night of her by-election victory, 'stop the world, Scotland wants to get on', and this spirit seemed to be embraced by many Scots. Her victory propelled the party into the popular conscience and many new members joined as a result.

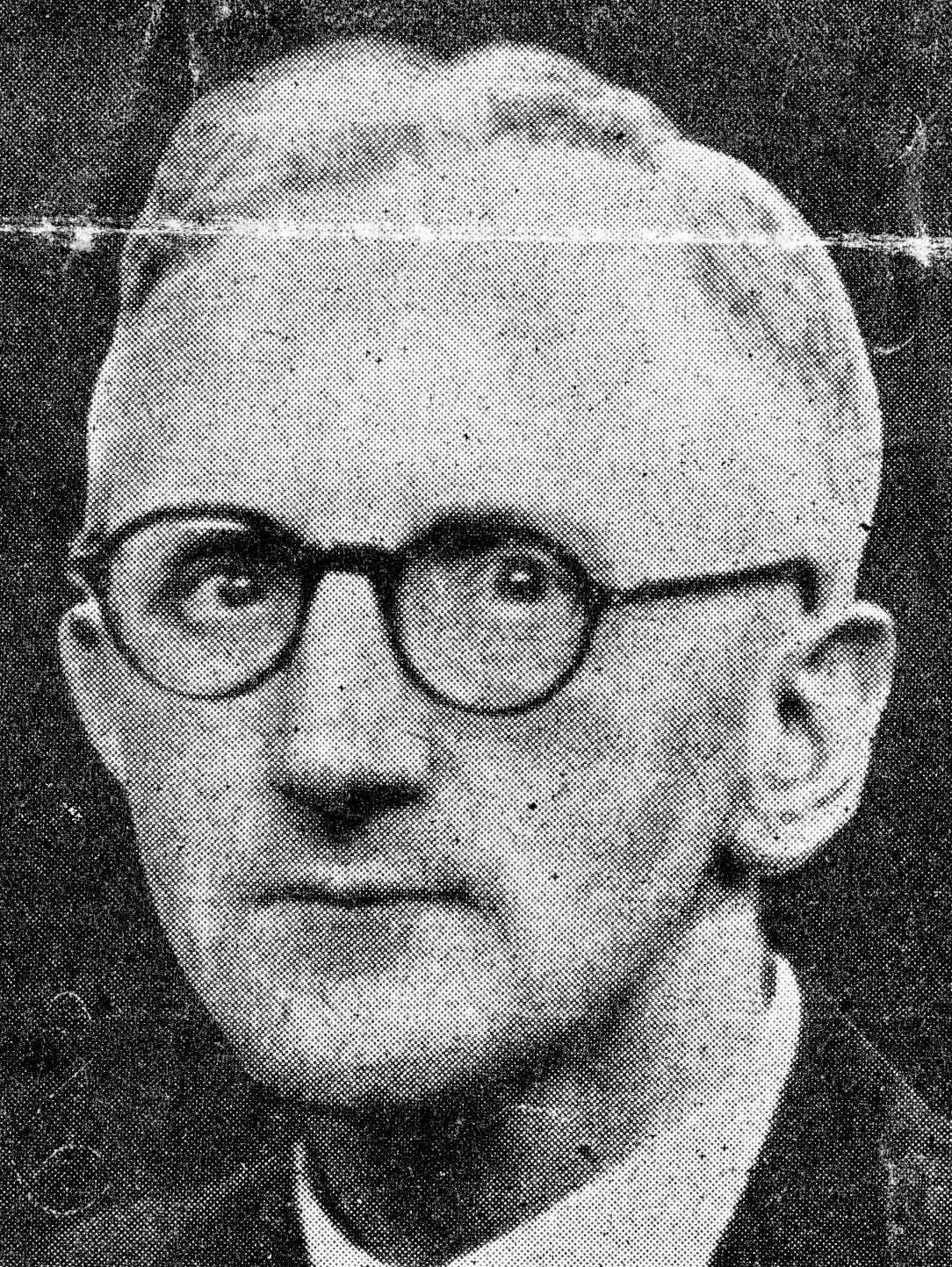
Arthur Donaldson was the leader from 1960 to 1969.

A novel feature of the 1967 SNP Annual Conference was that the party leader Arthur Donaldson was challenged for the position of party convenor. His challenger was Douglas Drysdale, who was vocally critical of Donaldson's leadership. Donaldson overwhelmingly defeated Drysdale to retain his position. Several prominent individuals formed the 1320 Club, hoping to develop a wider movement in the style of the Scottish Covenant Association, but they were expelled in 1968 for advocating paramilitary activity.

In local elections, the SNP were beginning to show they could compete also. In the 1967 Local Council elections, the SNP secured over 200,000 votes across the country making 27 gains in the burgh elections, and 42 in the counties. They managed to take control of Stirling council where former party leader Robert McIntyre became Provost. The SNP then went onto secure the largest share of the Scottish vote of any of the parties contesting the 1968 Local Council elections, winning some 40% of the vote.

Ewing's by-election victory and this improved electoral performance in the local elections helped to provoke the then UK Labour Government to establish the Kilbrandon Commission to set up the blue-print for the establishment of a devolved Scottish Assembly. It also prompted Edward Heath's announcement at the Conservative Perth Conference in 1968 that if he became Prime Minister he would establish a Scottish Assembly.

Scotland's unionist politicians were becoming increasingly worried at the growth of the SNP. The Labour Party in particular had cause for alarm as Scotland provided so much of their support base, and the SNP were now picking up support in their very heartlands.

At the 1969 party conference, William Wolfe was elected SNP leader in place of Arthur Donaldson.

== The 1970s ==
Map of the results of the October 1974 election in Scotland; an SNP Westminster high-water mark.

At the 1970 general election, the SNP improved their vote over 1966, but did not make a serious breakthrough. Ewing lost her Hamilton seat and the only consolation for the SNP was the capture of the Western Isles, making Donald Stewart into their only MP. Thereafter, though, the SNP entered a period of sustained growth following the pattern of the 1960s: a number of strong showings in individual by-elections.

There was a minor setback in the early 1970s when a small number of party members in Dundee left to form a Labour Party of Scotland. This new party contested the Dundee East by-election of 1973, and the number of votes they captured was more than the Labour candidate's margin of victory over the SNP candidate, Gordon Wilson. However, in the long-run, this new party folded and most of its members returned to the SNP.

They were bolstered by their capture of the Glasgow Govan seat with Margo MacDonald as their candidate from the Labour Party in a by-election in 1973. This again signalled to Labour that the SNP posed an electoral threat to them and in the February 1974 General Election they returned 7 MPs. The failure of the Labour Party to secure an overall majority prompted them to quickly return to the polls to secure such and in the October 1974 General Election the SNP performed even better than they had done earlier in the year, winning 11 MPs and managing to get over 30% of the vote across Scotland.

The main driving force behind the growth of the SNP in the 1970s was the discovery of oil in the North Sea off the coast of Scotland. The SNP ran a hugely successful It's Scotland's oil campaign, emphasising the way in which they believed the discovery of oil could benefit all of Scotland's citizens. While Scottish Labour's electoral dominance had been well-established at this point, since Labour – as the party that created the National Health Service galvanised support for its vision of the welfare state and working class solidarity across the nations of the UK; the discovery of North Sea oil offered nationalists an equally compelling vision – where oil wealth would provide Scotland an escape from the stagflation the British economy was experiencing and the social unrest it led to.

Former SNP leader William Wolfe has argued that along with this campaign, the SNP was aided by their support for the workers in the Upper Clyde Shipbuilders Work-in, being led by Jimmy Reid, as well as supporting the workers at the Scottish Daily Express when they attempted to run the paper themselves and other such campaigns.

=== 1979 United Kingdom general election ===
The SNP continued to ride high in the opinion polls throughout the 1970s, and many members are convinced that if the Liberals, led by David Steel hadn't maintained the Labour Government of the time in power, the SNP might have made further electoral gains in the resulting general election. It did well at the local elections of 1977, making 98 net gains and leaving much of Scotland under hung councils. However 1978 saw a Labour revival at the expense of the SNP, at three by-elections (Glasgow Garscadden, Hamilton and Berwick and East Lothian) and the local elections. The general election did not come until 1979, by which time the SNP's support had dwindled.

By 1976, the Labour Government had lost the three-seat majority it won at the 1974 general election after a series of by-election defeats, making its survival dependent on SNP support. In a position of the kingmaker, the SNP named home rule for Scotland as its price. Conservative opposition forced progress of the Scottish bill to a crawl, nevertheless, a bill to hold a referendum on establishing a devolved legislative assembly for Scotland was passed in 1978. However, Labour MP George Cunningham inserted an amendment requiring that the proposal be approved by 40% of all registered voters in order to take effect. In practice this doomed the home rule cause as while the proposed Scottish Assembly secured a majority of 51.6% at the referendum, a turnout of 63.7% meant only 32.9% of the electorate approved the bill. As a result, the SNP withdrew its support for the Labour Government.

In 1979, the SNP Parliamentary Group voted against the Labour Government in a Vote of No Confidence, causing the dissolution of the government and subsequent election. The then Labour Prime Minister, James Callaghan famously described this decision by the SNP as that of "turkeys voting for Christmas". After the 1979 general election, the SNP had only two seats, representing a net loss of nine seats. Margaret Thatcher became the UK's Prime Minister.

==== UK Government interference ====
The party was accused of paranoia when its leaders claimed it was being spied upon by government agents, but this belief was eventually substantiated by declassified government files. These files proved that the government had in fact spied on the SNP in the 1950s. During the 1970s, the British government used both police and agents placed within trade unions to limit the growth of the SNP the best it could. The Labour Party, which controlled the government at the time and drew a great deal of support from Scotland, saw that the SNP had become much more than a protest vote. It is alleged that government interference is part of what helped bring about the collapse in support for the party in 1979. Labour continues to ridicule the SNP for their claims of government interference. "The SNP appears totally paranoid. All the evidence shows they are absolutely no threat whatsoever to the British state," said a Labour spokesperson in response to the SNP's complaints. Despite these words, the Labour government has had several files on the SNP sealed for fifty years, citing reasons of national security.

=== Factionalism after 1979 ===
Scottish National Party 79 Group Logo

The party went into a period of decline after the failure to secure a devolved Scottish Assembly in 1979, its poor performance in the general election of that year, and a perceived complicity in helping Thatcher get elected by voting for the dissolution of the Labour government. A period of internal strife followed, culminating in the proscription of two internal groups, Siol nan Gaidheal and the left-wing 79 Group. However, several 79 Group members would later return to prominence in the party, including Alex Salmond, who would later lead the party. It proved too much for Margo MacDonald though, who was defeated by Douglas Henderson for the position of party deputy leader at the 1979 party conference, and left the SNP, angry at the treatment of the left wing of the party, although she would later return to the party and be elected as an MSP.

There was also another internal grouping formed within the party, primarily as a response to the growth of the 79 Group entitled the Campaign for Nationalism in Scotland, with the support of traditionalists such as Winnie Ewing. This group sought to ensure that the primary objective of the SNP was campaigning for independence outwith a traditional left-right orientation. If the group was successful, it would have undone the work of figures such as William Wolfe, who moved the SNP to become a clearly defined social democratic party in the 1970s.

== The 1980s ==
The period of internal factionalism inside the SNP came to an end at the 1982 SNP Conference, where internal factions were banned. The 79 Group, despite their proscription, were bolstered by the collapse of the Scottish Labour Party (SLP) in the aftermath of the 1979 election. This resulted in the SLP's leading figure, Jim Sillars deciding to join the SNP, as did a great number of other ex-SLP members. Sillars had been a Labour Party MP in the 1970s but, dissatisfied with the Labour Government's policy on Scottish devolution and their socio-economic programme, had in 1976 formed the SLP. This influx of ex-SLP members served to strengthen the left of the party, to which these new members naturally gravitated.

In 1979, William Wolfe stood down as SNP leader, and in the resultant leadership election Gordon Wilson was elected leader with 530 votes to 79 Group member Stephen Maxwell's 117 votes, and Willie McRae's 52 votes.

The 1980s offered little hope for the SNP with poor performances in both the 1983 and 1987 General Elections. Indeed, even the party leader, Gordon Wilson lost his seat in 1987. The party took stock of these results and started to analyse its policy platform. Sillars began to grow in influence in the party and the SNP was firmly placing itself on the left of centre.

Sillars argued against the idea that the party should eschew left-right politics in favour of focussing solely on independence by stating the Scottish people had to be given reasons as to why independence would benefit their lives, and that this should involve a fully developed socio-economic programme. He argued against the idea that somehow the country could be guided in a "tartan trance" to independence, as if the Scottish people could ignore the realities of the economic system in which they found themselves. Sillars was also key in moving the party to adopting a position of Independence in Europe to alleviate the "separatist" tag that the SNP's unionist opponents attached to them. Previously, the SNP had been sceptical about Scotland's continued membership of the EEC, but Sillars helped secure a firm commitment to an independent Scotland's membership.

There was a minor setback in 1987 when a few members on the left of the party broke away to establish a Scottish Socialist Party (not the same one that is in existence now) but in the long-run this small party did not establish itself and it folded without threatening to make a major electoral breakthrough.

As the 1980s wore on, the party managed to re-group and in 1988 the SNP managed to win the Govan seat in a by-election for the second time, with Sillars as their candidate. This was a huge upset, as the SNP overturned a Labour majority of around 19,000 and had not been expected to win. However, a hard-fought campaign using the party's sizeable activist base won through. Sillars' oratorical capabilities and street campaigning methods also played a decisive role in the party's victory.

Sillars' victory provoked great alarm amongst the Labour Party hierarchy in Scotland, much as Ewing's had in the 1960s. Fearing that their strong Scottish electoral base was under threat, they helped establish the Scottish Constitutional Convention to set out a blueprint for devolution. Initially the SNP looked as though they would get involved and party leader Gordon Wilson and Sillars attended an initial meeting of the convention. However, the convention's unwillingness to contemplate independence as a constitutional option persuaded Sillars in particular against getting involved and the SNP did not take part.

== The 1990s ==
=== The first Salmond era ===
In 1990 Wilson stood down as leader and was replaced by Alex Salmond, who defeated Margaret Ewing for the post by 486 votes to 186. Salmond's victory surprised many as Ewing had the backing of most of the party leadership, including Sillars and the party secretary at the time, John Swinney, although he would go on to become a key ally of Salmond. Ewing's prominent supporters made her many people's favourite to win the contest, but in the end Salmond was the convincing victor. He proved a capable leader with his witty and intelligent style of debate giving him a national prominence and boosting the SNP's profile.

In that same year the SNP presence at Westminster was boosted when Labour MP for Dunfermline West, Dick Douglas defected to the SNP, citing his dissatisfaction with the way Labour had handled the Poll Tax issue as one reason. This boosted the SNP numbers at Westminster to five.

The 1992 General Election had promised much for the SNP. It proved to be mixed in fortunes. The SNP held three seats they had won in 1987, but lost Govan. They also lost Dunfermline West, but this was not helped by the sitting MP Dick Douglas deciding to stand against Labour MP Donald Dewar in his Glasgow seat instead of defending the seat he had represented for years.

1999 Scottish Parliament election results

The SNP had failed to make headway in terms of winning seats. However, their campaign proved a success in terms of votes won, with the SNP vote going up by 50% from their 1987 performance. It proved too much to bear for Sillars though, and he quit active politics, famously describing the Scots as '90 minute patriots'. It also signaled the breakdown of the political relationship between Sillars and Salmond.

The intervening years between the 1992 and 1997 general elections were marked by some SNP electoral success. In the 1994 elections for the European Parliament the party managed to secure over 30% of the popular vote and return two MEPs (Winnie Ewing and Allan MacCartney). The SNP also came very close to winning the Monklands East by-election of that year, caused by the death of the leader of the Labour Party, John Smith. In 1995 they went one better, when the Perth and Kinross by-election was won by Roseanna Cunningham who later became the party's deputy leader.

The 1997 General Election saw the SNP double their number of MPs from three to six.

=== The Scottish Parliament ===
The return of the Labour Party to power came along with a referendum on Scottish devolution, which resulted in the establishment of the Scottish Parliament. This gave the SNP an opportunity to firmly establish itself as a political force in Scotland, and it returned 35 MSPs in the first Scottish Parliament election in 1999. Later that year, the party returned two members to the European Parliament, narrowly missing out on sending a third.

== The 2000s ==
=== Swinney era ===
In 2000 John Swinney MSP was elected leader, defeating Alex Neil MSP by 547 votes to 268 in a hotly contested leadership election to replace Alex Salmond as National Convenor. Swinney's leadership quickly came under challenge. His subdued style of debating technique was often contrasted with that of his more charismatic predecessor.

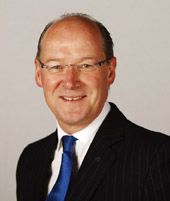
John Swinney served as leader from 2000 to 2004.

The first term of the Scottish Parliament did not offer the SNP much comfort. Two MSPs quit the party, Margo MacDonald and Dorothy-Grace Elder, citing the actions of some of their colleagues as reasons for their resignations. The SNP also performed poorly at the 2001 UK general election with a reduced share of the vote and one fewer MP.

Despite optimism that the party would at least retain the same number of MSPs they gained in 1999, a downturn in electoral fortune at the 2003 Scottish Parliament Elections weakened them somewhat. They returned 27 elected members in the Scottish Parliament, though remained the second largest party. The only parties which increased their representation in that election were the Scottish Socialist Party (SSP) and the Scottish Green Party, both of which also support independence.

Soon, Swinney's leadership was challenged by grassroots activist, Dr. Bill Wilson, in the summer of 2003. Wilson was broadly critical of what he argued were the centralising tendencies of the Swinney leadership, as well as a drift to the centre ground of politics away from the SNP's traditional position of the left. At the party conference of that year, the election took place with Swinney receiving 577 votes and Wilson taking 111.

2004 did not get off to a good start for Swinney's leadership. On 1 January, a former parliamentary candidate and a party activist in the Shetland Islands Brian Nugent announced that he was forming his own pro-independence party, the "Scottish Party" (which eventually relaunched itself as the Free Scotland Party) in response to what he perceived to be an overly pro-EU stance by the SNP.

Soon afterwards, the party's National Executive Committee decided to suspend and then expel Campbell Martin, an SNP MSP. Martin had backed Wilson's leadership challenge and had continued to be overtly critical of Swinney's leadership, resulting in disciplinary action.

Despite a slump in the vote and a decrease in the number of available seats from 7 to 6, the SNP was able to retain its two Members of the European Parliament at the 2004 European elections. Nonetheless, John Swinney announced his resignation on 22 June 2004. He said that he would remain as caretaker leader until a successor was elected.

=== 2004 leadership contest ===
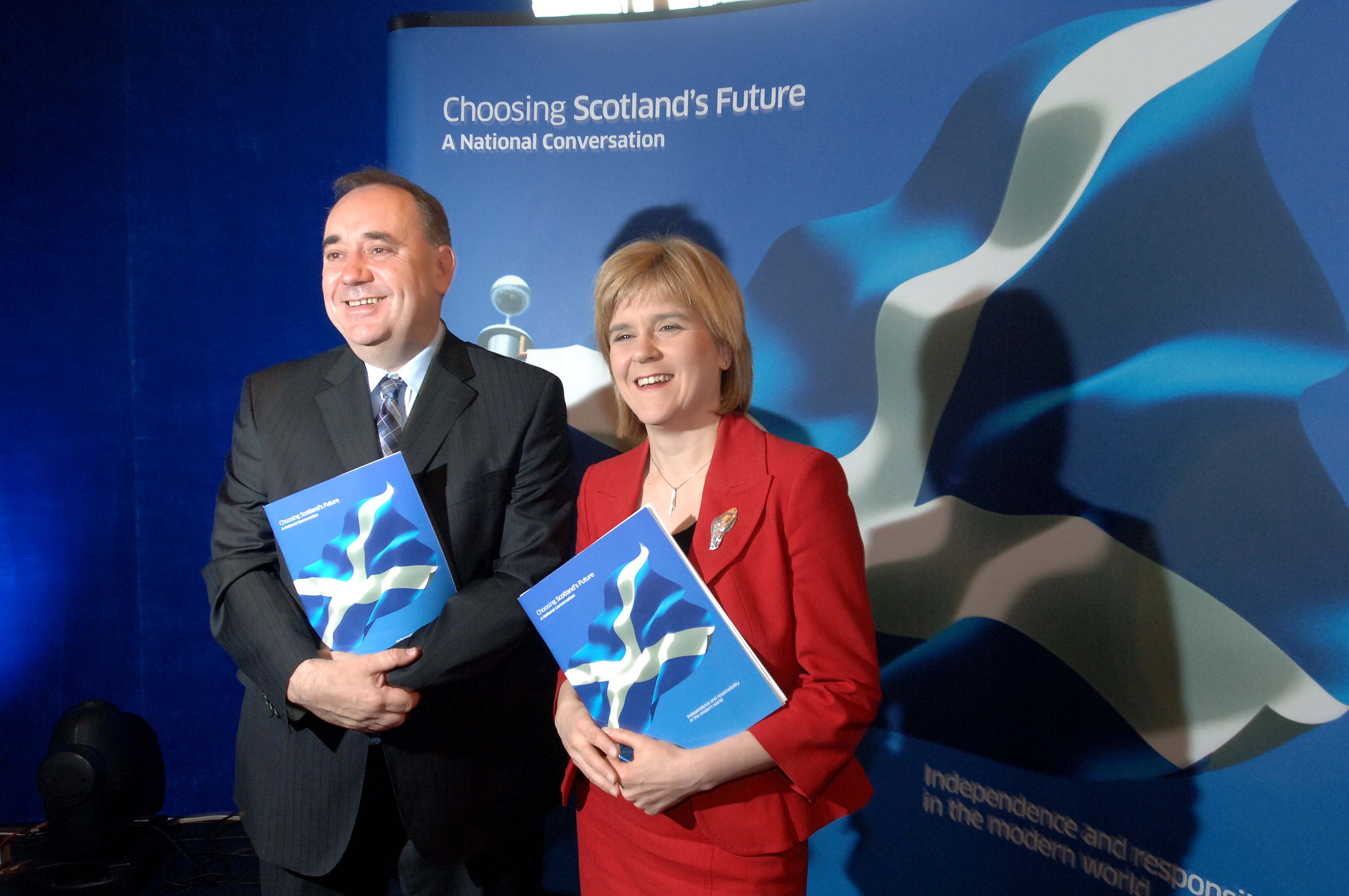
Alex Salmond and Nicola Sturgeon were elected Leader and Deputy Leader of the Scottish National Party in 2004.

Shortly afterwards, two MSPs (Roseanna Cunningham and Nicola Sturgeon) and one former MSP (Mike Russell) announced that they would be candidates in the election for the party leadership. Alex Neil MSP announced that he would not be a candidate, citing what he believed to be the hostility of senior party figures such as Fergus Ewing and Alex Salmond to the prospect of his becoming leader. In a surprise announcement on 15 July 2004, Alex Salmond announced that he would also be a candidate in the leadership race, despite having previously said "if asked, I'll decline, if nominated, I'll defer, and if elected, I'll resign". Nicola Sturgeon then withdrew from the contest and declared her support for Salmond and decided to stand for Deputy Leader.

This resulted in Kenny MacAskill pulling out of the race for deputy and declaring his support for Salmond and Sturgeon, leaving Sturgeon standing against Fergus Ewing and Christine Grahame. Shortly after Salmond and Sturgeon announced they were running on a joint ticket.

The campaign for leader was characterised by being a low-key affair. Salmond remained firm favourite to win back the leadership of the SNP. There remained greater doubt as to who would be the deputy leader with it being widely expected to be a much more close run affair than that for the post of leader.

There were some surprises during the course of the campaign. Alex Neil and Adam Ingram both came out in support of Alex Salmond, although they supported Grahame for deputy rather than Sturgeon. This was unexpected as both men had previously been critics of Salmond in the past. It was particularly surprising in light of Salmond's earlier comments, before he had entered the race that he would have difficulties working with Neil should he be elected leader, although he later went on the record to say that he should not have publicly said this.

There was some degree of criticism of Salmond's position by other candidates, who felt that his decision to lead the SNP from being a member of the British Parliament at Westminster rather than from the Scottish Parliament was contrary to the party's aim of independence. Nonetheless, on 3 September 2004, Salmond and Sturgeon were elected leader and deputy respectively. The result of the Leadership contest, in what was the first "One Member One Vote" election run by the SNP (as opposed to the delegate based elections of the past) was Salmond 4,952 (75.8%); Cunningham 953 (14.6%); and Russell 631 (9.7%). The result of the contest for Deputy Leader was Sturgeon 3,521 (53.9%); Ewing 1,605 (24.6%); and Grahame 1,410 (21.6%).

Since Salmond was an MP until 2010, Sturgeon led the party at the Scottish Parliament until Alex Salmond was elected as an MSP in 2007.

=== 2005 United Kingdom general election ===
The SNP had mixed fortunes in the general election held on 5 May 2005. They managed to gain two seats (Angus MacNeil winning in Na h-Eileanan an Iar and Stewart Hosie in Dundee East) from the notional four they held to bring their total to six Members of Parliament. MacNeil's victory received particular praise for the 9.2% swing from Labour that led to the victory, especially as it was the first SNP gain from Labour in a UK general election for 31 years. However, there was also disappointment in that the sitting MP Annabelle Ewing did not manage to win the new Ochil and South Perthshire constituency, finishing 688 votes behind the Labour candidate.

There was also disappointment in that the SNP's share of the Scottish vote fell to 17.7% and that they finished third behind the Liberal-Democrats; this was the first time this had ever happened. The SNP's share of the vote across the Scottish Central Belt was particularly low, with some candidates only just managing to achieve a high enough share of the vote in their constituency to retain their £500 deposit.

However, Alex Salmond was in buoyant mood in the aftermath of the campaign, describing the SNP's Westminster parliamentary group as "Scotland's Super Six" and also promising that the SNP would be far more competitive in the 2007 election for the Scottish Parliament.

=== The second Salmond era ===
The return of Salmond marked an important milestone in the SNP's ideological transformation. Already during his first stint as leader, Salmond had convinced the party to embrace gradualism and adopt "independence must be achieved by a referendum" as the new strategy – an end to the long-held nationalist suspicion of referendums as a tool for unionists to thwart the independence cause, as had been the case in the 1979 devolution referendum. With a strategy that would later be adopted by Conservative leader David Cameron, Salmond decided the only way to end New Labour's electoral dominance was to emulate it, while highlighting their few ideological differences where New Labour was less popular, such as its support for the Trident nuclear deterrent based in Scotland. Like New Labour, the SNP embraced neo-liberal economics and sought to follow the Irish model by slashing corporation tax and attracting international businesses, while ending its traditional radicalism by abandoning its plans for nationalisation and higher income taxes. Unlike New Labour, however, Salmond and his deputy Nicola Sturgeon coated their policies with a heavy douse of social democratic rhetoric in order to appear more authentically left-wing than Labour to the latter's supporters.

=== 2007 Scottish Parliament general election ===
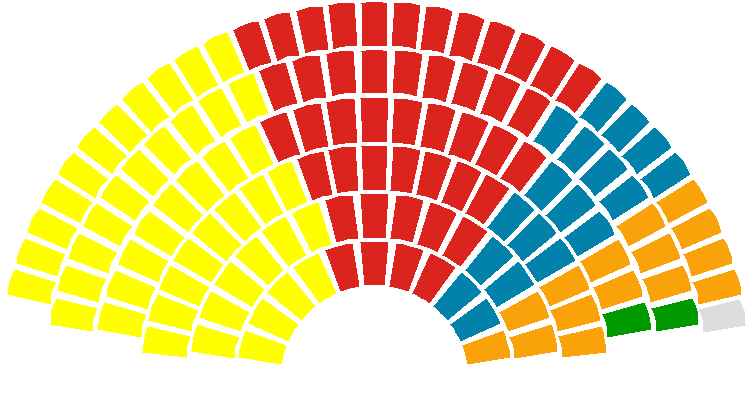
The SNP won 47 of the 129 seats, one seat more than Scottish Labour.

The Scottish National Party was victorious in the 2007 election to the Scottish Parliament, emerging as the largest party with 47 seats. It narrowly defeated the incumbent Scottish Labour Party, which had 46 seats. The Conservatives won 17 seats, the Lib Dems 16 seats, the Greens 2 seats, and the Independent candidate Margo MacDonald was re-elected. On 16 May 2007, Alex Salmond was elected First Minister by the Parliament and sworn in the next day at the Court of Session in Edinburgh. The SNP went on to win the 2008 Glasgow East by-election and the largest share of the Scottish popular vote in the 2009 European Parliament election. The SNP exploited voter fatigue with Labour – a 2006 poll found 56% Scots believed Labour had been in power in Scotland for too longer, the fallout from the 2003 invasion of Iraq and the power struggle between Tony Blair and Gordon Brown which eroded Labour's popularity. Devolution had clearly become a turning point in the SNP's electoral fortunes, as while it would struggle for relevance in a UK election, the devolved parliament provided the SNP with oxygen it otherwise could not compete with Labour. As all of the SNP's MPs made the switch to the Scottish Parliament while only a handful of Labour MPs followed suit, the clear contrast in commitment to Scotland further the SNP's narrative that it, not Labour, was fighting for Scotland's interests. Salmond became the first pro-independence Scottish leader since the Act of Union of 1707.

== The 2010s ==
The 2010 general election proved disappointing for the SNP, as the party only retained their six seats without making any gains, although they did overtake the Liberal Democrats to become the second-largest party on the popular vote share.

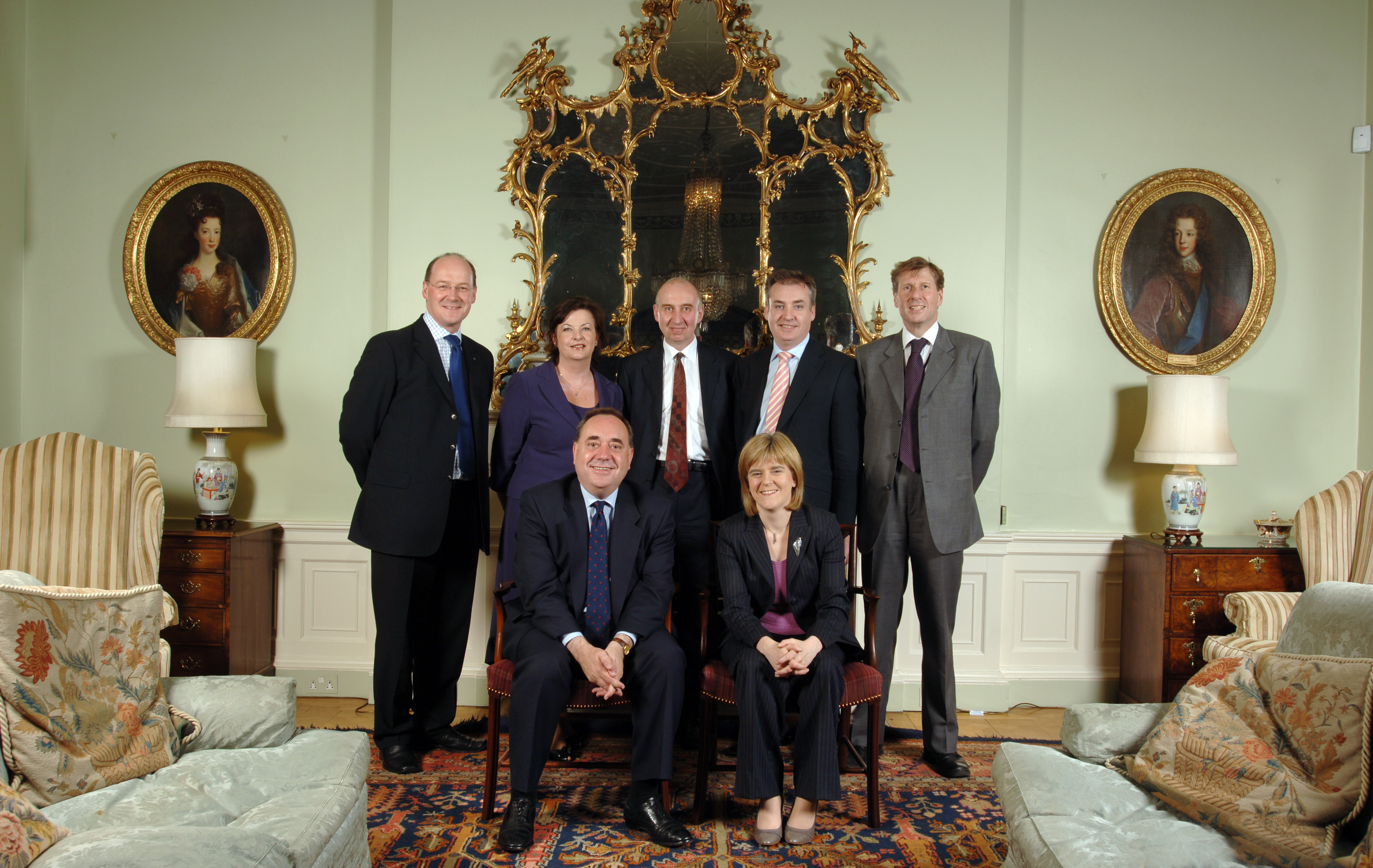
First SNP government led by Alex Salmond, 2007

=== Majority government in Holyrood ===
The 2011 Scottish Parliament election, however, delivered the first majority government of the devolved Scottish Parliament as the SNP won a landslide of 69 seats, considered a remarkable feat as the Additional Member System used to elect MSPs was originally implemented to prevent single-party governments, as well as to produce proportional results. Following the result, the leaders of all the main opposition parties resigned their positions. The SNP's victory came on the back of the collapse of the Lib Dems, who was tainted by its participation in the Conservative-led UK Government, while Scottish Labour had clearly failed to inspire voters in opposition. Later, the SNP confirmed its intent to hold a referendum on Scottish independence.

=== Independence referendum campaign ===
Yes Scotland campaign logo

In October 2012, the SNP voted at its party conference to change their stance on NATO, supporting continued membership for an independent Scotland. This was widely seen as the resolution of the long-standing NATO debate within the party. In response, two MSPs – John Finnie and Jean Urquhart – resigned from the party and became Independent MSPs. Another MSP, John Wilson, followed after the independence referendum.

In November 2013, some policies the SNP would pursue in an independent Scotland were detailed in Scotland's Future, the Scottish Government's 670-page white paper on the case for Scottish independence and the means through which Scotland would become an independent country. It had previously been claimed by the SNP that the White Paper would be a "game changer" and support for independence did rise after the publication of the document.

The referendum was held on Thursday 18 September 2014. The Yes Campaign was defeated, with 44.7% of voters voting "Yes" and 55.3% voting "No" in response to the question "Should Scotland be an independent country?". The turnout was 84.6%.

=== Sturgeon era ===
Following the defeat of the Yes Campaign, on the morning of 19 September, Alex Salmond announced he intended to step down as Leader of the Scottish National Party and First Minister of Scotland at the SNP's Autumn Conference.

On 14 November 2014, Nicola Sturgeon was elected as Leader of the Scottish National Party unopposed, with Dundee East MP Stewart Hosie elected as Depute Leader. On 20 November 2014, Sturgeon was formally sworn in as First Minister of Scotland, becoming the first female to hold the position. She embarked on a tour of Scotland, speaking to 12,000 people at the Hydro Arena in Glasgow on 22 November 2014.

Winning 56 of 59 seats in 2015 and 50% of the popular vote

The SNP's party membership increased dramatically post referendum, from around 25,000 members on the day of the referendum to around 92,000 as of 22 November 2014.

=== 2015 SNP landslide ===
The SNP rebounded from the loss in the independence referendum at the 2015 UK general election, led by Nicola Sturgeon. The party went from holding six seats in the House of Commons to 56, mostly at the expense of the Labour Party. All but three of the fifty-nine constituencies in the country elected an SNP candidate in the party's most comprehensive electoral victory at any level; the party became the third-largest in the Commons, overtaking the Liberal Democrats — the Lib Dems or Liberals had been the third party since the Second World War.

=== 2016 parliamentary elections ===
The SNP remained in control of the Scottish Parliament following the 2016 parliamentary elections. However, the SNP dropped from 69 seats at the 2011 election to 63, losing their majority. Nicola Sturgeon retained her post as First Minister under an SNP minority government.

=== 2016 United Kingdom European Union membership referendum ===
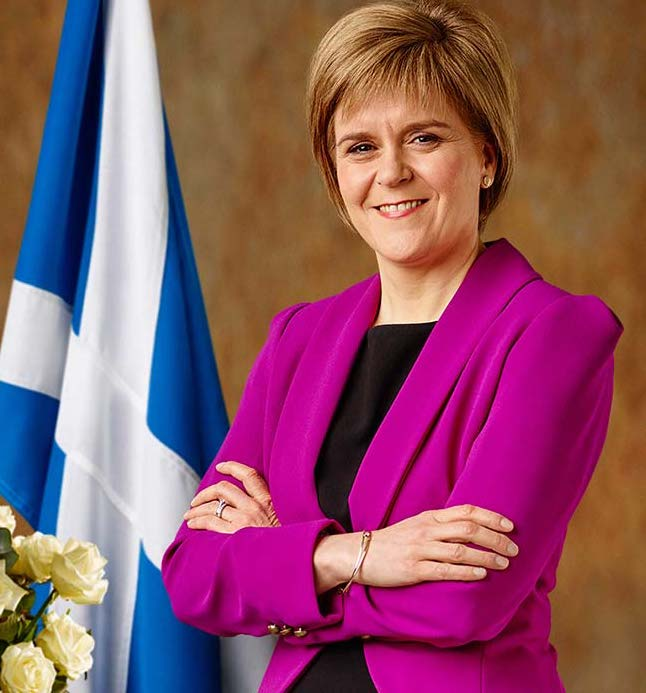
Nicola Sturgeon is the first female leader and First Minister of Scotland.

The SNP was the only party to oppose the parliamentary bill which authorised a referendum on the UK's membership of the EU a year prior. While the SNP campaigned against European Communities membership in the 1975 referendum, it campaigned for Remain alongside Labour, the Liberal Democrats, the Greens and Plaid Cymru, while the Remain campaign was also supported by the UK Government and Prime Minister David Cameron, despite the Conservative Party remaining officially neutral. The UK Independence Party was the only main party in Great Britain to campaign for Leave. The UK as a whole voted for Leave by 52% on the back of English support, with England voting for Leave by 53%, while Scotland voted overwhelmingly for Remain by 62%, alongside Northern Ireland and Greater London. In its manifesto for the 2016 Scottish Parliament election, launched in April, two months before the EU referendum, the SNP stated that "a significant and material change in the circumstances that prevailed in 2014, such as Scotland being taken out of the EU against our will" would justify another independence referendum. Scotland's desire to remain in the EU and the direction taken by Conservative governments since the referendum have driven the SNP campaign for another independence referendum.

=== 2017 United Kingdom general election ===
The SNP underperformed against polling expectations, losing 21 seats to bring their Westminster MPs down to 35. In what was largely attributed to their stance on holding a second Scottish independence referendum and saw a significant swing to the Unionist parties, with seats being gained by the Conservatives, Labour and the Liberal Democrats and a significant reduction in their majorities in the seats they did manage to retain. High-profile losses included: SNP House of Commons leader Angus Robertson in Moray and former SNP leader and First Minister Alex Salmond in Gordon; both of whom lost their seats to the Conservative Party.

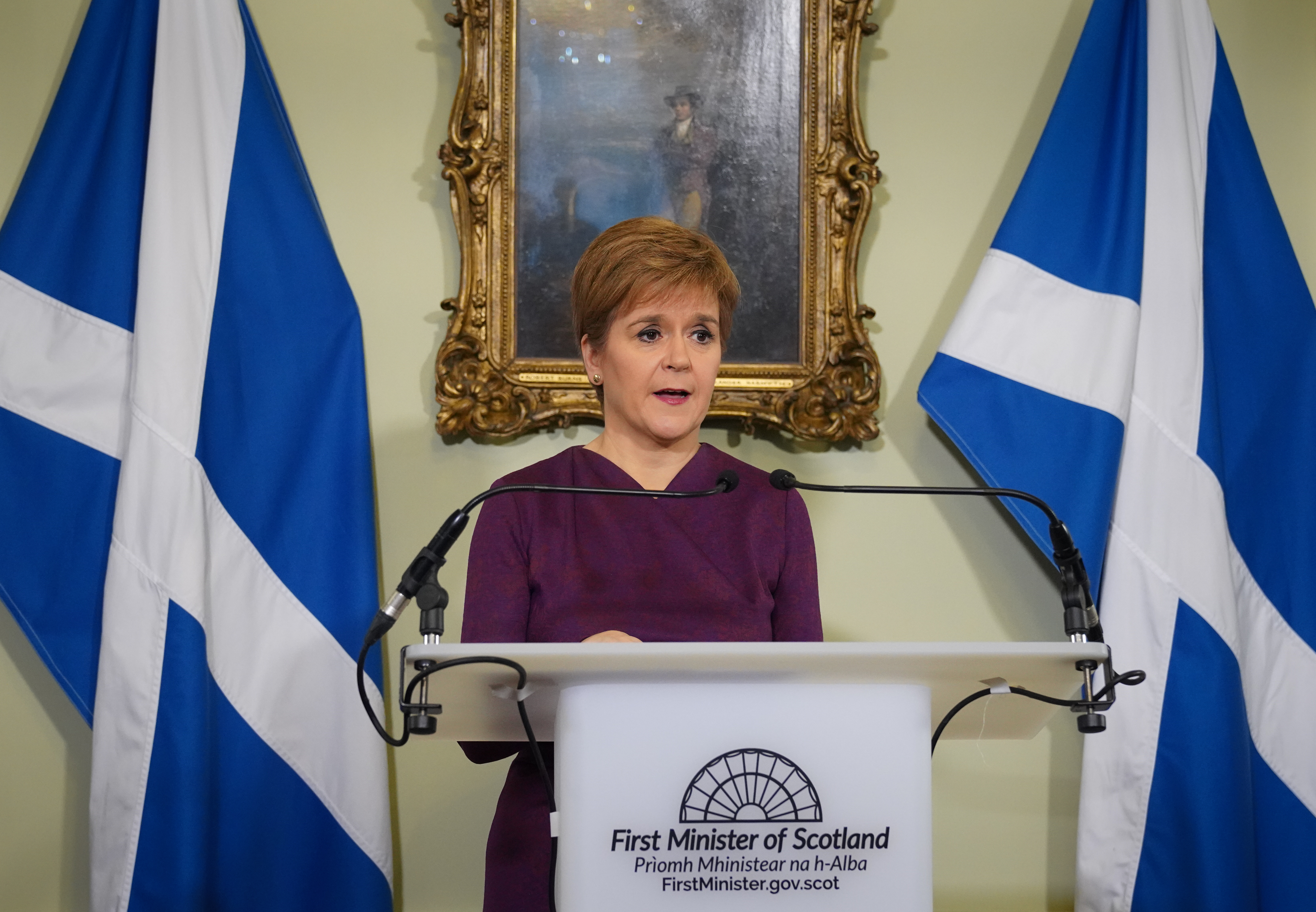
Sturgeon requesting a transfer of powers for a second independence referendum, 2019

=== 2019 United Kingdom general election ===
The party achieved its best ever European Parliament result in the final election before Brexit, with the party taking its MEP total to 3 or half of Scottish seats. Later that year the SNP experienced a surge in the 2019 general election, winning 45.0% of the vote in Scotland. Although the party suffered a loss to the Liberal Democrats, it gained the seat of its then UK leader Jo Swinson, along with 7 from the Conservatives and 6 from Labour. Overall the party finished with 48 out of 59, or 81% of Scotland's Westminster seats.

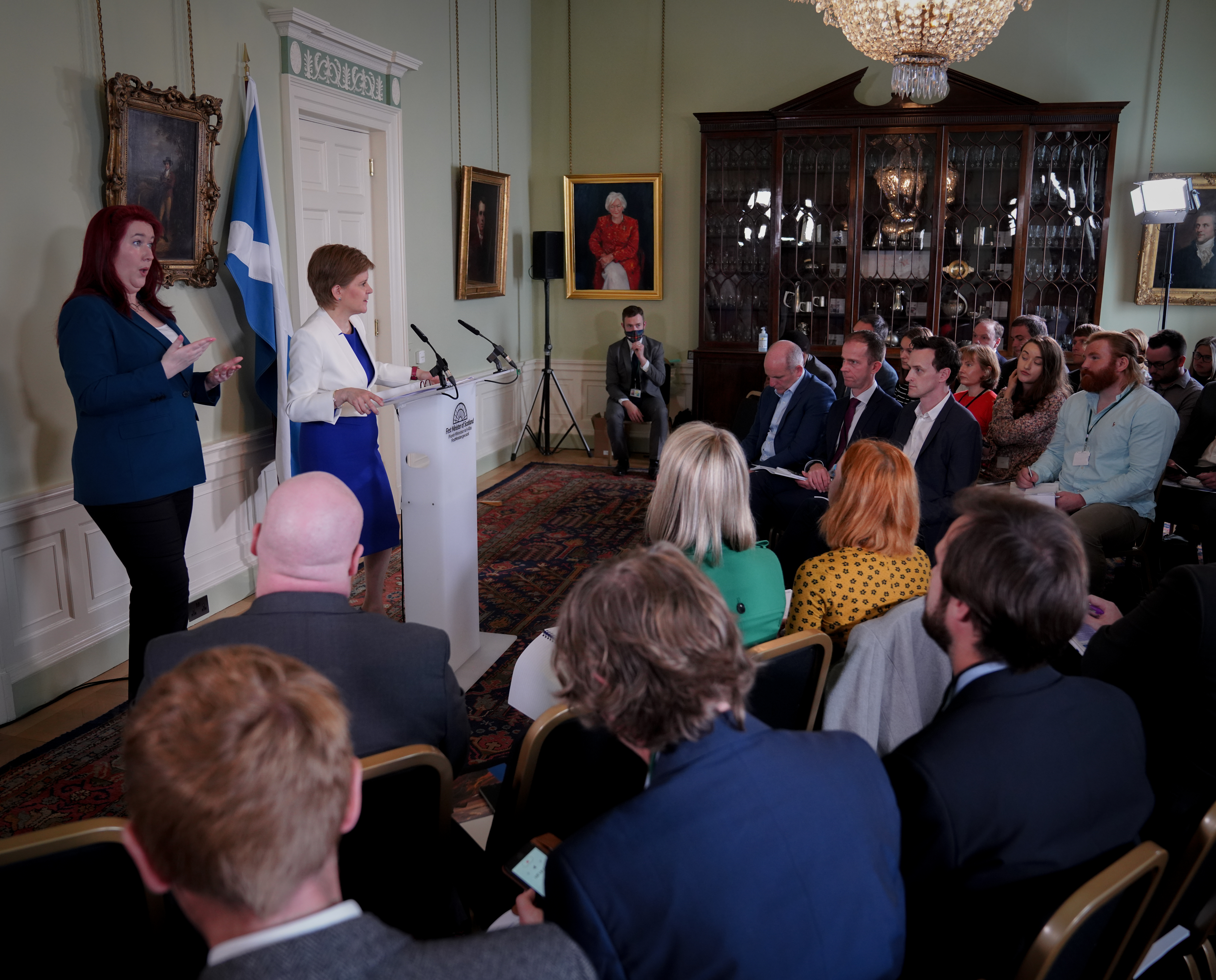
Sturgeon addresses journalists at Bute House over her plans to hold a referendum in 2023, a proposal that would fail after the Supreme Court ruled the parliament didn't have the power.

== The 2020s ==
=== 2021 Scottish Parliament Election ===
At the 2021 Scottish election, the SNP won 64 seats, one seat short of a majority, albeit achieving a record high number of votes, vote share and constituency seats, and leading to another minority government led by the SNP. Sturgeon emphasised after her party's victory that it would focus on controlling the COVID-19 pandemic as well as pushing for a second referendum on independence.

Although in 2021 they won with a minority, a majority of MSPs elected had come from parties that supported Scottish independence; this prompted negotiations between the SNP and the Scottish Green Party to secure a deal that would see Green ministers appointed to government and the Scottish Greens backing SNP policies, with hopes that this united front on independence would solidify the SNP's mandate for the second independence referendum. The Third Sturgeon government was formed with Green support.

In the 2022 Scottish local elections, the SNP remained as the biggest party, winning a record number of councillors and securing majority control of Dundee.

On 15 February 2023, Sturgeon announced her intention to resign as leader and first minister.

On 16 March 2023, it was revealed that the SNP's membership had fallen to 72,000, down from over 125,000 at the end of 2019. As a result of this, CEO Peter Murrell resigned on 18 March after criticism was levied at him over the way the figures were published.

=== Post Sturgeon era (2023 onwards) ===
Humza Yousaf was announced as the next leader of the SNP on 27 March 2023 after winning the leadership election. Yousaf defeated Kate Forbes in the final stage, with 52% of the vote to Forbes's 48%. The leadership election was dominated by the strategy for a second independence referendum and the Gender Recognition Reform Bill, which has divided the party. Yousaf's views align with the party establishment and he is expected to continue Sturgeon's policies. The other two candidates, Forbes and Regan, were seen to be part of a new generational shift in the party.

On 5 April 2023, Peter Murrell, husband of Nicola Sturgeon and former party CEO, was arrested in connection with an investigation into Scottish National Party finances. It was reported that Police Scotland were searching a number of addresses including SNP headquarters and his home in Glasgow. A Niesmann + Bischoff motorhome was subsequently seized from a home in Fife that is believed to belong to Murrell's mother. He was later released without charge, pending further investigation. On 7 April 2023 it was announced that the SNP's auditors, Johnston Carmichael, had resigned from their role around October 2022, leaving only three months for their successors to approve and submit to the Electoral Commission the party's annual accounts for 2022. However, Humza Yousaf claimed he was unaware of the resignation until he won the SNP leadership contest in late March 2023. This comes less than a year after Douglas Chapman, SNP MP, resigned as their national treasurer stating that he was not given sufficient information to discharge his role.

In October 2023, Ash Regan defected to the breakaway Alba Party after being a candidate in the previous leadership election against Yousaf and Forbes. In April 2024, a government crisis lead to the resignation of Humza Yousaf as first minister of Scotland. John Swinney returned as SNP leader after being elected unopposed in the 2024 Scottish National Party leadership election. In the July 2024 United Kingdom general election in Scotland, the SNP faced catastrophic losses in terms of seats falling from 48 seats to just 9. They were wiped out of the Central Belt, and their seats were now concentrated in North East Scotland and the Scottish Highlands. In October 2024, former SNP leader Alex Salmond died suddenly in North Macedonia.
