= Leader of the Scottish National Party =

Head of the Scottish National Party

- Logo of the Scottish National Party

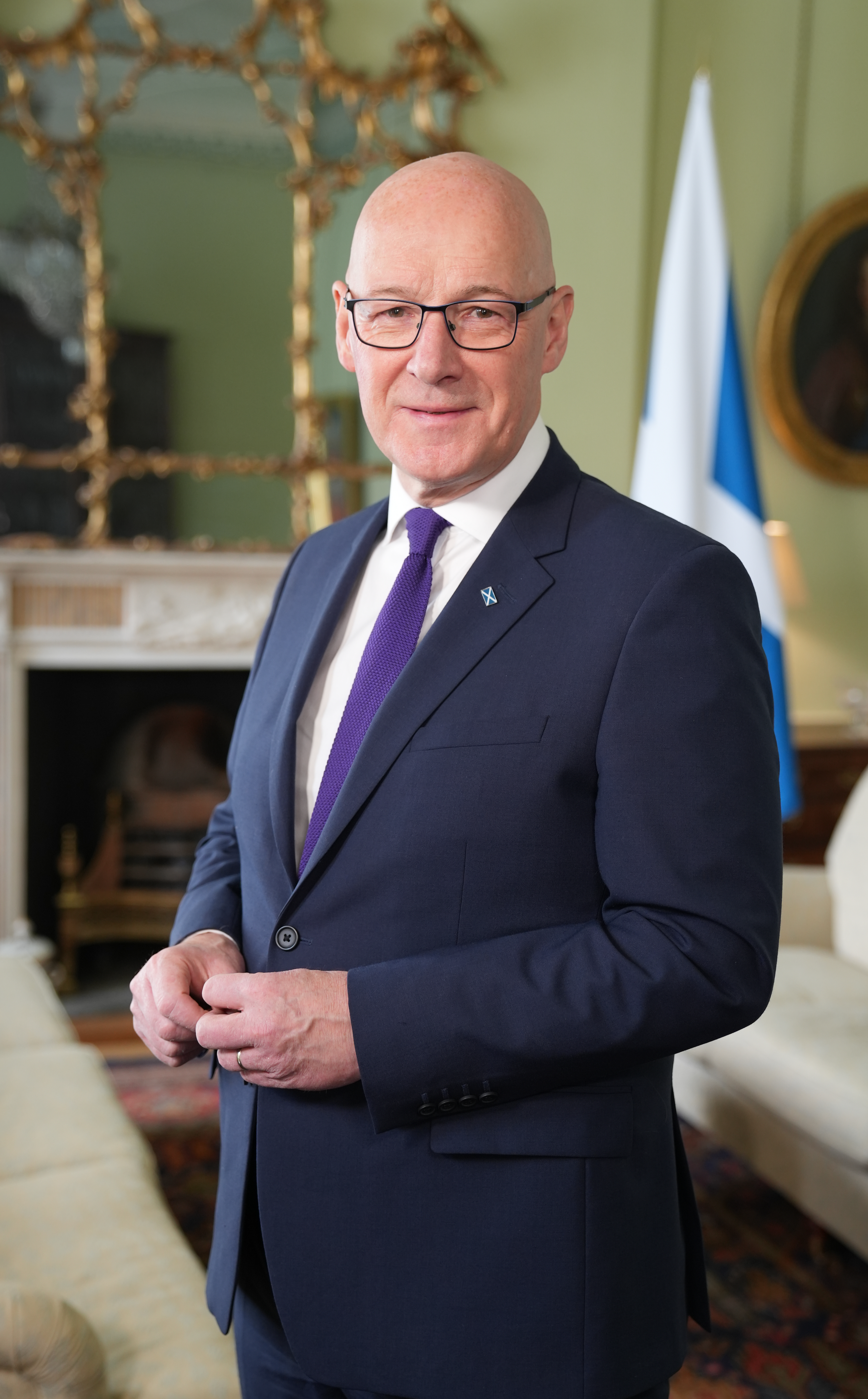
- Incumbent; John Swinney since 6 May 2024
- Inaugural holder: Alexander MacEwen
- Formation: 7 April 1934
- Deputy: Keith Brown
- Website: https://www.snp.org

The leader of the Scottish National Party is the highest position within Scotland's Scottish National Party (SNP). The incumbent is John Swinney, who was elected unopposed in the 2024 leadership election on 6 May 2024, succeeding Humza Yousaf as party leader.

Scotland has had a devolved government since 1999. When the SNP is Scotland's major governing party, as it currently is, its leader has also been the First Minister of Scotland.

== History ==
The post was officially created on 7 April 1934 with the foundation of the SNP. The role was titled Chairman of the Scottish National Party from 1934 until 1969, with the first chairman, Alexander MacEwen, appointed to the office in 1934. In 1969 the title of chairman was replaced with that of National Convener, with William Wolfe the first person elected as National Convener. The post gained its current title of Leader at the SNP spring conference on 24 April 2004.

While Gordon Wilson had the longest uninterrupted spell as leader, lasting just over eleven years from 1979 to 1990, Alex Salmond has been the party's longest-serving leader overall, serving twenty years and two months across two spells as leader.

== Other party leadership ==
Keith Brown is the deputy leader of the party; however, he is not the Deputy First Minister of Scotland. Dave Doogan is the party's leader in Westminster since 2026, following the disqualification of Stephen Flynn due to his election to the Scottish Parliament.

== Leaders of the Scottish National Party (1934–present) ==
Leader (Birth–Death)	Portrait	Political office	Took office	Left office
Sir Alexander MacEwen (1875–1941)		Provost of Inverness (1925–1931); Councillor for Benbecula (1931–1941)	7 April 1934	1936
Prof Andrew Dewar Gibb KC (1888–1974)		Candidate for Combined Scottish Universities (1936, 1938)	1936	1940
William Power (1873–1951)		Candidate for Argyllshire (1940)	1940	30 May 1942
Douglas Young (1913–1973)		Candidate for Kirkcaldy Burghs (1944)	30 May 1942	9 June 1945
Prof Bruce Watson (1910–1988)			9 June 1945	May 1947
Dr Robert McIntyre (1913–1998)		MP for Motherwell (1945); Provost of Stirling (1967–1975); Councillor for Stirling (1956–1975)	May 1947	June 1956
James Halliday (1927–2013)		Candidate for Stirling and Falkirk (1959)	June 1956	5 June 1960
Arthur Donaldson (1901–1993)		Councillor for Angus (1946–1955); Councillor for Forfar (1945–1968)	5 June 1960	1 June 1969
William Wolfe (1924–2010)		Candidate for West Lothian (1970–79)	1 June 1969	15 September 1979
Gordon Wilson (1938–2017)		MP for Dundee East (1974–1987)	15 September 1979	22 September 1990
Alex Salmond (1954–2024) (1st Term)		MP for Banff and Buchan (1987–2010); MSP for Banff and Buchan (1999–2001)	22 September 1990	26 September 2000
John Swinney (born 1964) (1st Term)		MSP for North Tayside (1999–2011); MP for North Tayside (1997–2001)	26 September 2000	3 September 2004
The Right Hon. Alex Salmond (1954–2024) (2nd Term)		First Minister (2007–2014); MSP for Aberdeenshire East (2011–2016); MSP for Gordon (2007–2011); MP for Gordon (2015–2017)	3 September 2004	14 November 2014
The Right Hon. Nicola Sturgeon (born 1970)		First Minister (2014–2023); MSP for Glasgow Southside (2011–2026); MSP for Glasgow Govan (2007–2011); MSP for Glasgow (1999–2007)	14 November 2014	27 March 2023
The Right Hon. Humza Yousaf (born 1985)		First Minister (2023–2024) MSP for Glasgow Pollok (2011–2026); MSP for Glasgow (2011–2016)	27 March 2023	6 May 2024
The Right Hon. John Swinney (born 1964) (2nd Term)		First Minister (2024–present); MSP for Perthshire North (since 2011); MSP for North Tayside (1999–2011); MP for North Tayside (1997–2001)	6 May 2024	Incumbent
