= Billy Wolfe (politician) =

Scottish politician

Leader of the Scottish National Party
- In office 1 June 1969 – 15 September 1979
- Preceded by: Arthur Donaldson
- Succeeded by: Gordon Wilson

Depute Leader of the Scottish National Party
- In office 1966–1969
- Leader: Arthur Donaldson
- Preceded by: Sandy Milne
- Succeeded by: George Leslie

Personal details
- Born: William Cuthbertson Wolfe; 22 February 1924 Bathgate, West Lothian, Scotland
- Died: 18 March 2010 (aged 86) Hamilton, South Lanarkshire, Scotland
- Party: Scottish National Party
- Spouses: Arna Dinwiddie (m. 1953; div. 1989) Catherine McAteer (m. 1993)
- Children: 4 (1st marriage)
- Profession: Chartered accountant

William Cuthbertson Wolfe (22 February 1924 – 18 March 2010) was a Scottish accountant, manufacturer and Scottish National Party (SNP) politician. He was the National Convenor (leader) of the SNP from 1969 to 1979, playing a central role in the transformation of the SNP into a modern, progressive political movement, and in the development of the SNP's social democratic political philosophy.

== Background ==
Wolfe was born in Bathgate, West Lothian, the son of Thomas Wolfe, owner of George Wolfe & Sons Ltd. and the Bathgate Forge Co. Ltd, which manufactured shovels. He was educated at Bathgate Academy and George Watson's College, Edinburgh, and saw active service during World War II, serving with the Scottish Horse (Royal Artillery) from 1942 to 1947 in France, the Low Countries, Germany, Indonesia and Malaya. Following demobilization, he qualified as a chartered accountant in 1952, and was company secretary of the family firms from 1952 to 1964.

He later established his own business, Chieftain Forge Ltd (1964–1986), supplying and manufacturing forestry equipment and shovels. Billy Wolfe was a man of wide interests: a longstanding member of the Saltire Society, the Scout Association and the Scottish Campaign for Nuclear Disarmament, a Justice of the Peace, and an officebearer in the Scottish Poetry Library, as well as being a poet in Scots in his own right. Initially he was more interested in cultural matters, but his dissatisfaction with the government of Scotland grew, and he became convinced of the need for Scottish independence.

== Political career ==
Wolfe joined the SNP in 1959. He stood as the SNP candidate in the 1962 West Lothian by-election against Tam Dalyell, making a stunning impact by coming in second place in an area where the SNP had previously made little impact. The result propelled him into party office as vice-chairman for Policy and Publicity in 1964, and then as Senior Vice-chairman (Deputy Leader) in 1966. Wolfe formed the Social and Economic Inquiry Society of Scotland, a forum committed to advancing the case for independence through statistical research. His idea of fusing the St Andrew's Cross with a thistle led to the creation of a distinctive new SNP logo, which is still in use today. He played a central role in the development of party policy, writing an iconic policy statement, SNP and You, which radically changed the SNP's outlook, adapting the existing policy on decentralization to accommodate the social strains from ongoing deindustrialization. Wolfe stood as SNP parliamentary candidate for West Lothian at the 1964, 1966, 1970, both elections in 1974, and 1979 general elections.

In June 1969, at the SNP Annual National Conference in Oban, Wolfe was elected as chairman (leader) of the SNP, defeating the incumbent leader, Arthur Donaldson, by 544 votes to 238. Having swung his support behind the 'It's Scotland's oil' campaign that changed the party's fortunes, he associated the SNP with the trade union campaigns against shipyard and other industrial closures and asserted its role as a radical participant in Scottish politics. Wolfe was instrumental in identifying publicly the social democratic, left-of-centre credentials of the SNP.

It was during Wolfe's period as leader that the party had considerable electoral success in elections to the Westminster parliament, winning 30% of the vote in Scotland and 11 of the 71 Scottish seats in the October 1974 General Election, though Wolfe failed to win a seat of his own in West Lothian in the two general elections of that year, despite gaining an increased share of the vote. His exclusion from the powerful new group of SNP MPs caused some difficulties for his leadership of the party. However, following a difficult period which saw the passing of the Scotland Act 1978, a number of internal divisions in the SNP and the failure of the party to win in a series of by-elections, in 1978 Wolfe announced his intention to stand down as leader after almost ten tumultuous years in office. The resultant loss of influence led to his being sidelined as the SNP moved into the 1979 general election campaign, and a disastrous performance in which the SNP only managed to retain 2 of their 11 MPs. Wolfe was succeeded by Gordon Wilson at the SNP Annual National Conference in September 1979.

In 1979, Wolfe encouraged a band of left-wingers in the SNP, known as the 79 Group, annoying those on the fundamentalist wing. Although he was elected as president of the SNP in 1980, succeeding Robert McIntyre, Wolfe's term of office ended in June 1982, following an intervention by him in advance of the proposed visit of Pope John Paul II to Scotland, causing serious controversy by claiming the Pope represented an "alien culture".

In a January 1982 letter to the Church of Scotland magazine, Life and Work, Wolfe attacked the appointment of a papal nuncio to the United Kingdom. In a subsequent letter to The Scotsman in April 1982, following the outbreak of the Falklands War, he said it would be a negation of democracy for "the cruel and ruthless fascist dictatorship of a Roman Catholic state", i.e. Argentina, to take over the "mainly Protestant and democratically minded Falklanders, mostly descendants of Scots". In both instances the SNP's National Executive Committee disowned Wolfe's statements, causing Wolfe to withdraw his candidacy from that year's election for the office of party president. Wolfe later apologised for his remarks, saying "I ask for forgiveness of those whom I hurt, if they understand me now. I can see myself then as others saw me ... I don't know why I did it". His second wife, Kate McAteer, was a practising Roman Catholic.

== Personal life ==
William Wolfe married Arna Dinwiddie in 1953 and they had four children. They divorced in 1989. He married Catherine McAteer in 1993. The marriage lasted until his death.

He died at Udston Hospital, Hamilton in March 2010, aged 86. Alex Salmond and Iain Gray were among the political leaders who offered their condolences. Salmond stated that Wolfe had "transformed it [the SNP] into a modern political party".

== Positions and commitments ==
- Treasurer, Saltire Society, 1953–1960
- West Lothian County Commissioner, Scout Association, 1960–1964
- Honorary President of Heriot-Watt University Students' Association, 1966–1969
- Member, Forestry Commission's National Committee for Scotland, 1974–1987
- Treasurer, Scottish Campaign for Nuclear Disarmament, 1982–1985
- Secretary, Scottish Poetry Library, 1985–1991
- Director, Eriskay Pony (Purebred) Studbook Society - Comann Each nan Eilean Ltd, 2002–2010

== Publications ==
- Scotland Lives: the Quest for Independence, 1973

Party political offices
Preceded by Sandy Milne	Vice Chairman of the Scottish National Party; 1963–1966 with Sandy Milne 1963–1964; Douglas Drysdale 1964–1966	Succeeded by James Braid, Douglas Drysdale, John Gair and James C. Lees
Preceded by Sandy Milne	Senior Vice Chairman (Depute Leader) of the Scottish National Party; 1966–1969	Succeeded by George Leslie
Preceded by Arthur Donaldson	National Convener (Leader) of the Scottish National Party; 1969–1979	Succeeded by Gordon Wilson
Preceded by Robert McIntyre	President of the Scottish National Party; 1980–1982	Succeeded by Donald Stewart
