= 1967 Scottish National Party leadership election =

Scottish National Party (SNP) leadership election

- 1967
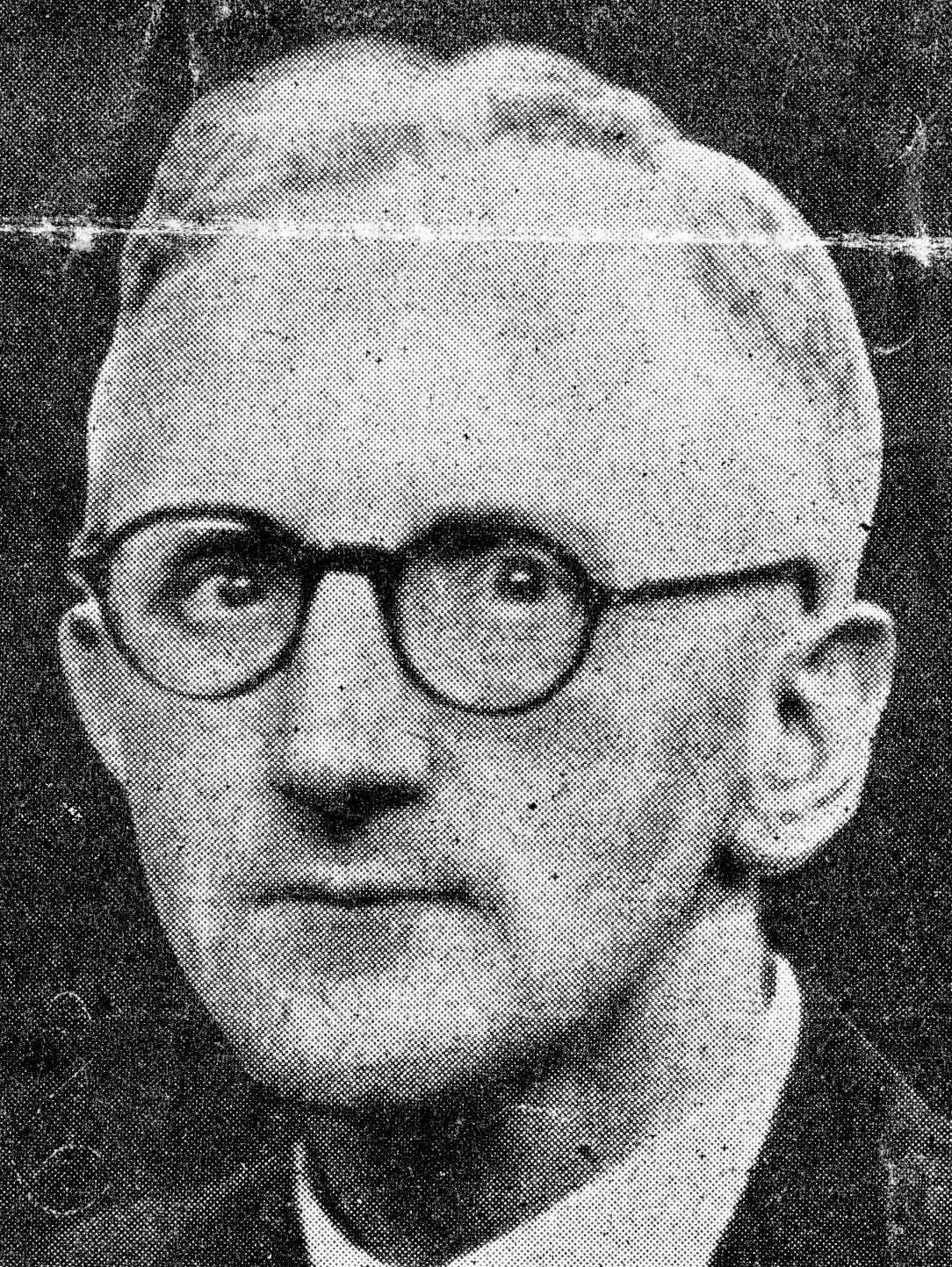

Candidate	Arthur Donaldson	Douglas Drysdale
Popular vote	362	37
Percentage	90.7%	9.3%
Leader before election
Arthur Donaldson
Elected Leader
Arthur Donaldson

There was a leadership election for the Scottish National Party (SNP) held in 1967. Arthur Donaldson easily retained the leadership of the party.

Arthur Donaldson had been leader of the SNP since 1960, during which time the party had increased its membership, and won a seat in Parliament. However, Douglas Drysdale, the party's Vice Chairman (Finance) had become increasingly critical of Donaldson's leadership and stood against him at the party conference. Drysdale was regarded as talented, but was little-known among the party's grassroots.

The 1967 conference was much larger than previous events, and many attendees were new to politics and to the SNP. However, they were familiar with Donaldson, who also wrote regularly for the Scots Independent newspaper, and chaired the conference.

Donaldson won the election in a landslide, with 362 votes to Drysdale's 37. Donaldson decided to stand down two years later, triggering the 1969 Scottish National Party leadership election.
