= Electoral history of Humza Yousaf =

List of elections featuring Humza Yousaf as a candidate

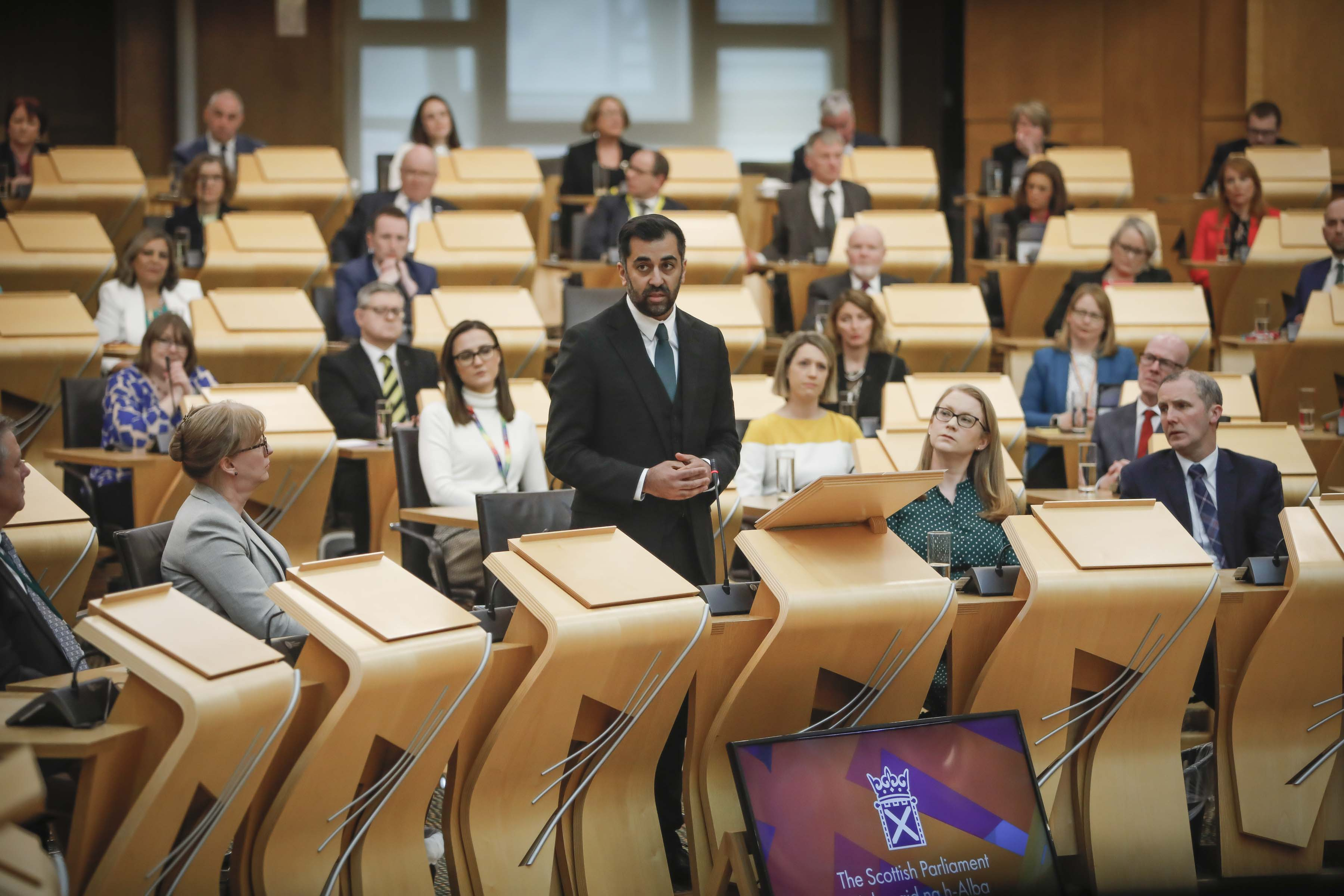
Humza Yousaf was the First Minister of Scotland and Leader of the Scottish National Party, the first minority ethnic person to hold either of the positions.

This is a summary of the electoral history of Humza Yousaf, the First Minister of Scotland and Leader of the Scottish National Party between 2023 and 2024, and Member of the Scottish Parliament for Glasgow Pollok since 2016.

== Scottish Parliamentary elections ==
=== 2016 Scottish Parliament election ===
2016 Scottish Parliament election: Glasgow Pollok
Party	Candidate	Constituency			Regional		
Party	Candidate	Votes	%	±%	Votes	%	±%
SNP	Humza Yousaf (Note: Incumbent member on the party list, or for another constituency)	15,316	54.8	▲10.1	13,902	49.5	▲7.4
Labour Co-op	Johann Lamont (Note: Lamont stood on a joint ticket on behalf of Scottish Labour and the Scottish Co-operative Party. The regional list vote was for Scottish Labour only.) (Note: Incumbent member for this constituency)	8,834	31.6	▼15.8	7,237	25.8	▼12.3
Conservative	Thomas Haddow	2,653	9.5	▲3.8	2,545	9.1	▲4.9
Liberal Democrats	Isabel Nelson	585	2.1	0.0	375	1.3	▼0.1
TUSC	Ian Leech	555	2.0	New			
Scottish Green					1,363	4.9	▲2.4
Solidarity					915	3.3	New
UKIP					582	2.1	▲1.6
BUP					341	1.2	New
Animal Welfare					224	0.8	New
Scottish Christian					212	0.8	0.0
RISE					185	0.7	New
Women's Equality					158	0.6	New
Independent	Andrew McCullagh				25	0.1	New
Majority		6,482	23.2	N/A			
Valid Votes		27,943			28,064		
Invalid Votes		142			69		
Turnout		28,085	45.8	▲6.3	28,133	45.9	▲6.4
SNP gain from Labour Co-op		Swing		▲13.0			

== Party elections ==
=== 2023 Scottish National Party leadership election ===
Candidate	First preferences	%	Final result	%
Humza Yousaf ✓	24,336	48.2%	26,032	52.1%
Kate Forbes	20,559	40.7%	23,890	47.9%
Ash Regan	5,599	11.1%	Eliminated	

== First Minister Nominating Elections ==
First minister nominative elections
Parliamentary term	Date	Candidates	Votes received
6th Parliament	28 March 2023	Humza Yousaf	64
6th Parliament	28 March 2023	Douglas Ross	31
6th Parliament	28 March 2023	Anas Sarwar	22
6th Parliament	28 March 2023	Alex Cole-Hamilton	4
