= Scottish Oil =

Articles on Scottish Oil include:

- Scottish Oils Ltd, a shale oil company
- It's Scotland's oil, a political slogan relating to North Sea oil
