= 1945 Motherwell by-election =

UK parliamentary by-election

- 12 April 1945

Motherwell constituency for the House of Commons
	First party	Second party
Candidate	Robert McIntyre	Alexander Anderson
Party	SNP	Labour
Popular vote	11,417	10,800
Percentage	51.4%	48.6%
Swing	▲51.4%	▼2.1%
- Map showing the Motherwell Parliamentary constituency within Scotland.
MP before election
James Walker
Labour
Subsequent MP
Robert McIntyre
SNP

The 1945 Motherwell by-election was held on 12 April 1945, following the death of Labour MP for Motherwell, James Walker.

The by-election took place during the Second World War during unusual political conditions. No general election had been held since 1935, at which James Walker narrowly gained the seat for Labour from the Unionist Party.

There was a truce between the major parties: Labour, the Conservative Party, Liberal Party and the Liberal National Party. The Communist Party of Great Britain, which had held Motherwell in the past, also undertook to abide by the truce. As a result, the only opposition in by-elections came from independents, minor parties and occasional unofficial party candidates aligned with major parties.

For the by-election, the Labour Party selected Alexander Anderson. His only opposition came from the Scottish National Party, then a small party advocating Scottish independence, who selected Party Secretary Robert McIntyre.

== Result ==
The by-election was won by McIntyre, who became the first SNP Member of Parliament. However, Anderson regained the seat from McIntyre at the 1945 general election a few months later.

1945 Motherwell by-election
Party	Candidate	Votes	%	±%
SNP	Robert McIntyre	11,417	51.4	New
Labour	Alexander Anderson	10,800	48.6	−2.1
Majority		617	2.8	N/A
Turnout		22,217	54.0	−21.9
SNP gain from Labour		Swing		

== See also ==
- List of United Kingdom by-elections (1931–1950)
