= Alexander Anderson (Scottish politician) =

Scottish politician

Alexander Anderson (12 April 1888 – 11 February 1954) was a Labour Party politician in Scotland, who represented the Motherwell constituency in the House of Commons for nine years.

Born in Wick, Caithness, Anderson was educated at the University of Edinburgh. He became a teacher, and also joined the Social Democratic Federation. He served on its executive in 1902, and then on that of its successor, the British Socialist Party (BSP), in 1913 and 1914. In 1915, he tied in the vote with John Maclean, but he won a re-vote. However, he was defeated in 1916.

The BSP affiliated to the Labour Party, and Anderson thereafter devoted his time to it, serving on Motherwell and Wishaw Town Council from 1929 until 1945.

He first stood for the seat at a by-election in April 1945, when he lost to Dr. Robert McIntyre of the Scottish National Party. He won it at the general election in July that year, and held it until his death in 1954 aged 65. During his time in parliament he was Chairman of the Estimates Committee and served on parliamentary delegations to Iceland, Germany and Australia.

After his death, the London correspondent for The Glasgow Herald described him as "the very model of a good House of Commons man" and stated news of his "passing grieved M.P.s of all parties". The same reporter stated that he "was unsurpassed in his party for all-round knowledge of Scottish affairs" and described Anderson as "one of the wittiest and most companionable of men". The same report also stated that Anderson had been visibly in failing health during what would prove to be his final session in parliament. Indeed, it noted that his friends had been concerned that he had suddenly collapsed in the House of Commons the Tuesday before his death, but had insisted on remaining at Westminster for a session of the Scottish Grand Committee. The article argued that his death in these circumstances raised issues about "whether the incessant strain of parliamentary life" was not becoming more than older MPs could cope with.

Parliament of the United Kingdom
Preceded by Robert McIntyre	Member of Parliament for Motherwell; 1945–1954	Succeeded by George Lawson
