= Ian Macdonald (Scottish politician) =

Scottish politician (born 1934)

National Organiser of the Scottish National Party
- In office 1962–1968
- Preceded by: Office established
- Succeeded by: John McAteer

Personal details
- Born: Ian C. H. Macdonald; 1934 (age 91–92)
- Party: Scottish National Party

Ian C. H. Macdonald (born 1934) is a former Scottish nationalist activist.

Macdonald studied at the Glasgow Academy and University of Glasgow before undertaking National Service He joined the Scottish National Party (SNP), and began working on a farm in Killearn, in 1956 starting a branch of the SNP in nearby Balfron. The following year, he inherited the family farm in Newmilns, and started the Irvine Valley branch of the party. He was elected to the SNP organisation committee, and in 1961 to its executive. The party also stood him as its candidate at the 1961 Glasgow Bridgeton by-election, its first by-election candidacy in nine years. Supported by election agent Alan Niven, Macdonald won 18.7% of the vote in a seat which the party had never previously contested. This result delighted Macdonald, who sold the farm to become the SNP's first full-time national organiser since the early 1950s.

Macdonald proved a very effective organiser, travelling the nation to set up new branches. He married Karen, daughter of SNP activist Douglas Drysdale, although then struggled as Douglas interfered with his work.

By the time Macdonald stood down, in 1968, the SNP had gone from having 140 branches to having 484, and official membership had risen to 120,000. He subsequently became a vice-president of the party, and remained on the party's national executive through the 1970s, during which time he ran a dry cleaning business. He also stood unsuccessfully for the SNP in several elections: Clackmannan and Eastern Stirlingshire in 1970, Hamilton in February and October 1974, when he took 39% of the vote, and Central Ayrshire in 1979.

Macdonald also received an Honorary Doctorate from Heriot-Watt University in 1967. He was interviewed by The National in 2025, alongside Karen, at which time the couple remained SNP members.

Party political offices
Preceded by New position	National Organiser of the Scottish National Party; 1962–1968	Succeeded by John McAteer
Preceded by James C. Lees	Scottish National Party Vice Chairman (Organisation); 1970–1975	Succeeded by Brian Innes-Will
