= Alexander MacEwen =

British politician (1875–1941)

Sir Alexander MacEwen
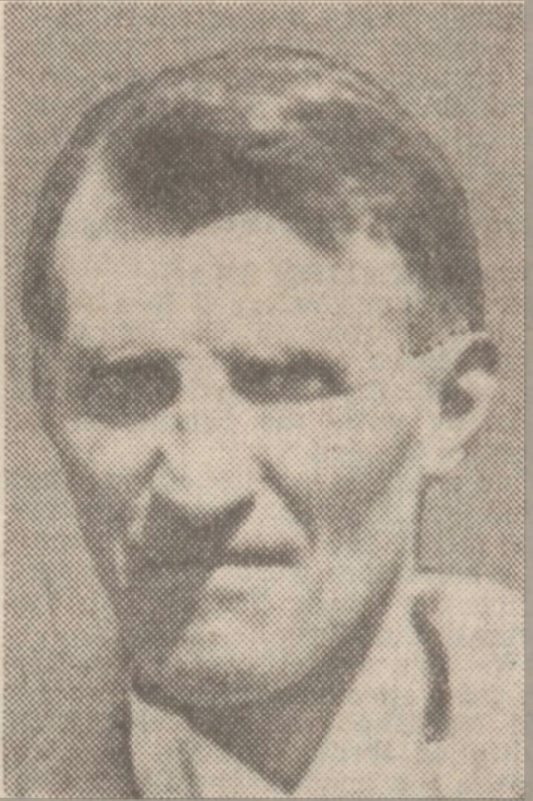

Leader of the Scottish National Party
- In office 7 April 1934 – 1936
- Preceded by: New office
- Succeeded by: Andrew Dewar Gibb

Personal details
- Born: Alexander Malcolm MacEwen; 10 January 1875 Kolkata, British India
- Died: 29 June 1941 (aged 66) North Kessock, Ross and Cromarty, Scotland
- Party: Scottish National Party (1934–1941)
- Other political affiliations: Liberal Party; Scottish Party
- Spouse: Mary Henderson (m. 1906–1941)
- Children: 5
- Education: University of Edinburgh
- Profession: Solicitor

Sir Alexander Malcolm MacEwen (10 January 1875 – 29 June 1941) was a Scottish politician and solicitor who served as the inaugural leader of the Scottish National Party (SNP) from 1934 to 1936.

== Early life ==
Alexander Malcolm MacEwen was born on 10 January 1875 in Calcutta, India, the son of Robert Sutherland Taylor MacEwen (1839–1900), a barrister from Dornoch who served in India as the Recorder of Rangoon. MacEwen was educated at Clifton College, Bristol and the University of Edinburgh. After qualifying as a solicitor in 1901, he began his legal career in Stornoway, before joining the Inverness legal firm of Stewart Rule & Co., where he later became senior partner.

== Political career ==
A member of the Liberal Party, MacEwen was elected to Inverness Town Council in 1908, and served as Provost of Inverness 1925–1931. During his period in office, Provost MacEwen promoted schemes for the improvement of public health and housing in Inverness, and served as a member of the Inverness-shire Education Committee, and as chairman of the Board of Directors of the Royal Northern Infirmary. He also served as a councillor on Inverness County Council, representing Benbecula.

He was Chief of the Gaelic Society in 1930.

In 1932 MacEwen was one of the founders of the Scottish Party, and in the 1933 Kilmarnock by-election he stood as the joint candidate of the Scottish Party and the National Party of Scotland, coming fourth with 6,098 votes.

=== Leadership of the Scottish National Party (1934–1936) ===
With the merger of the National Party of Scotland and the Scottish Party on 7 April 1934 to form the Scottish National Party, MacEwen became the new party's first leader. The party's performance in the 1935 general election was disappointing with only Inverness and MacEwan in the Western Isles achieving respectable results.

MacEwen stood down as leader of the SNP in 1936, when he was succeeded by Andrew Dewar Gibb. He died at his home on the Black Isle in 1941, aged 66. MacEwen had three sons and two daughters. His son Malcolm joined the Communist Party of Great Britain and became a prominent conservationist.

== Honours ==
He was knighted by King George V in the 1932 Birthday Honours for services to local government and public health in Scotland. MacEwen Drive in Inverness is named after him.

== Publications ==
- The Thistle and the Rose - Scotlands Problem To-Day, 1932
- Scotland at School - Education for Citizenship, 1938
- Towards Freedom, 1938

Party political offices
New political party	Chairman (Leader) of the Scottish National Party; 1934–1936	Succeeded by Andrew Dewar Gibb
