= Douglas Drysdale =

Scottish nationalist, activist and businessman (1915–1984)

Charles Douglas Drysdale (16 October 1915 – 22 December 1984) was a Scottish nationalist activist and businessman.

== Life and career ==
Drysdale was born in Glasgow on 16 October 1915, the second son of William Drysdale of Drysdales of Yoker, the pump manufacturers who supplied most of Glasgow's shipbuilding industry. He qualified as an engineer, and spent the war years with the Royal Electrical and Mechanical Engineers (REME), achieving the rank of major and being awarded the MBE.

At the end of the war, Douglas and his elder brother, Ian Drysdale, left Drysdales (which had been bought out by Weir Pumps by then) and started Drysdale Brothers (Larbert) Ltd, Bronze Founders and Engineers.

He became active in the Scottish National Party (SNP) in 1962, having moved from Glasgow first to Dunblane and then to Dollar, Clackmannanshire. His wife, Olwen Drysdale, started the Dollar Branch of the SNP in 1962 and they were both very active politically.

Despite having no previous political experience, he was elected as the SNP's Vice Chairman with responsibility for Organisation and Finance in 1964. In 1966, his area of responsibility was reduced to only Finance.

Drysdale first stood for the SNP at the 1964 general election in Clackmannan and Eastern Stirlingshire, taking 12.2% of the vote and narrowly failing to hold his deposit. At the 1966 general election, Drysdale increased his vote share to just over 20%, one of the SNP's best results. However, he became unhappy with the leadership of Arthur Donaldson, and in 1967 he stood for the leadership of the party against Donaldson. He had little support among the party's grassroots, and was heavily defeated, 362 votes to 37.

He had a major stroke in 1969, but continued to be supportive of the cause for independence as much as he could until his death in 1984. His elder daughter Karen married the SNP National Organiser, Ian Macdonald, in 1963, and his younger daughter Lorna married Robert Anderson, who was involved in the "Tartan Army" Scottish nationalist direct action movement of the mid-1970s.

Drysdale died at Perth Royal Infirmary on 22 December 1984, aged 69.

Party political offices
Preceded by Sandy Milne; William Wolfe	Scottish National Party Vice Chairman (Organisation and Finance); 1964–1966	Succeeded by Douglas Drysdale; James C. Lees
Preceded by Douglas Drysdale	Scottish National Party Vice Chairman (Finance); 1966–1967	Post abolished
