= Bruce Watson (politician) =

Scottish politician (1910–1988)

Dr Bruce Watson B.Sc. PhD FRIC

Leader of the Scottish National Party
- In office 9 June 1945 – May 1947
- Preceded by: Douglas Young
- Succeeded by: Robert McIntyre

Personal details
- Born: 3 April 1910 Aberdeen, Scotland
- Died: 16 May 1988 (aged 78) Invergordon County Hospital, Ross and Cromarty, Scotland
- Party: Scottish National Party
- Spouse: Johan Angus (m. 1939-1988)
- Education: University of Aberdeen
- Profession: Lecturer, Professor (Chemistry)

Mearns Bruce Watson (3 April 1910 – 16 May 1988) was a Scottish organic chemist and Scottish National Party politician. He was the leader of the Scottish National Party (SNP) from 1945 to 1947.

Watson was born in Rubislaw, Aberdeen, the son of Mearns Watson snr, a fruit salesman. He studied chemistry at the University of Aberdeen and later taught there from 1935 to 1945 as an assistant lecturer in chemistry, and then as professor of organic chemistry. In 1945 he moved to Robert Gordon's Institute of Technology, where he was Head of Chemistry until he retired in 1975. As an organic chemist, Watson was exempted from military service during World War II and served instead as gas protection officer for the whole of the north of Scotland.

In 1945, the SNP Chairman Douglas Young resigned after the party banned members from also holding membership of British political parties. Watson held that attempting to win self-government through British parties was a waste of time, and took up the vacant party chairmanship without facing a challenge.

In 1946, Watson chaired a large conference in Perth which demanded self-government for Scotland. In 1947, he stood down from the Chairmanship of the SNP in order that he could be succeeded by Robert McIntyre, a former Member of Parliament and the best-known figure in the party.

Based in Aberdeen, Watson remained active in the SNP into the 1960s.

Party political offices
Preceded by Douglas Young	Chairman (Leader) of the Scottish National Party; 1945–1947	Succeeded by Robert McIntyre
