= Sandy Milne =

Scottish politician (1920–1984)

William Alexander Milne, known as Sandy Milne (17 March 1920 – 1984) was the first deputy leader of the Scottish National Party.

Milne was born and grew up in Stirling, where he studied at Stirling High School before attending the University of Glasgow. While there, he joined the Glasgow University Scottish Nationalist Association, and became its president in 1947. He then returned to Stirling to work as a teacher, having joined the Scottish National Party (SNP), for which he was elected to Stirling Town Council and later became Senior Bailie. He stood in Aberdeen North at the 1959 general election, where he took 5.8% of the vote, then again in Stirling and Falkirk Burghs at the 1964 general election, managing 10%. In 1966, he increased this to 14.4%.

In 1960, Milne was elected as Vice-Chairman of the SNP. William Wolfe was elected alongside him in 1963, but the following year, he became the party's first Senior Vice Chairman, and Deputy Leader, serving for two years. He died in Stirling in 1984.

Party political offices
Preceded by George Leask; Malcolm Shaw	Vice Chairman of the Scottish National Party; 1960–1964; With: William Wolfe 1963–1964	Succeeded by William Wolfe
New post	Senior Vice Chairman (Depute Leader) of the Scottish National Party; 1964–1966	Succeeded by William Wolfe
