= John McAteer =

Scottish politician

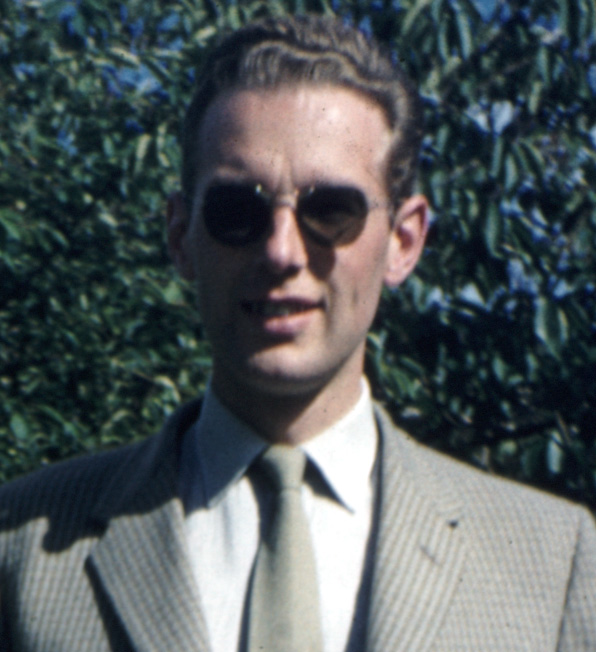
- John McAteer, circa 1960s

National Organiser of the Scottish National Party
- In office 1968–1977
- Preceded by: Ian Macdonald
- Succeeded by: Alan McKinney

Personal details
- Born: 5 January 1933 Coatbridge, North Lanarkshire, Scotland
- Died: 22 February 1977 (aged 44) Glasgow, Scotland
- Party: Scottish National Party
- Spouse(s): Kate Parker (m. 1961)
- Children: 4

John McAteer (5 January 1933 – 22 February 1977) was a Scottish politician who was a leading figure in the Scottish National Party of the 1960s and 1970s.

== Formative years ==
McAteer was the eldest of three children. His parents, Unity Begley and James McAteer, were Irish immigrants from the Fanad peninsula, County Donegal. Born in Coatbridge, he was sent to his aunt's croft in Fanad at the age of 2 to be cured of a stutter. He returned to Coatbridge at 6 years old speaking only Gaelic. His parents and two sisters emigrated to the US in the mid-1950s, but he did not follow them.

== Teaching ==
Following national service in Egypt and Aden, he attended Jordanhill teacher training college where he qualified as a Technical teacher. He went on to teach woodwork, metalwork and technical drawing at several schools, eventually taking a post as Principal of technical at Saint Saviour's, Bellshill.

== Marriage ==
He married Kate Parker in 1961. They had four boys.

== SNP Years ==
McAteer became active in the Scottish National Party in the 1950s.

=== Hamilton By-Election 1967 ===
He was Winnie Ewing's election agent in her successful by-election campaign in Hamilton in 1967. In her autobiography, Ewing says "...as I fought the seat I had many homes from homes, the main one being that of John and Kate McAteer..." She goes on to say: "... my agent, John McAteer, a descendant of an Irish rebel, was totally splendid in the job." Gordon Wilson: "Under the direction of John McAteer... there was a taut, well-organised campaign supported by thousands of supporters."

George Leslie: "We had to take the good points from the Pollok campaign and make them better. The most important person in all of this was John McAteer, who was Winnie's election agent and, later, national organiser. There was a plan in Hamilton." The organisation on the ground was formidable. "Again, it was John McAteer."

Hugh MacDonald: "John was the architect of the organisational and political strategy that shattered the Labour establishment with in its fortress of Hamilton. In terms of sheer professionalism it was the finest piece of organisation and deployment of forces that the National Party has witnessed."

=== SNP National Organiser ===
He served as National Organiser for the SNP from 1968 until his death in 1977. During this period, the SNP saw sustained growth, culminating in the return of 7 Westminster MPs in the 1974 General Election. Also notable during this time was Margo MacDonald's victory in the Govan by-election in 1973.

As National Organiser he drove across Scotland to visit local party branches and received significant annual mileage reimbursements.

=== Illness and death ===
Initially misdiagnosed with lower back pain, he died of bladder cancer in a Glasgow hospital on 22 February 1977.

Party political offices
Preceded by Ian Macdonald	National Organiser of the Scottish National Party; 1968–1977	Succeeded by Alan McKinney
