= 1969 Scottish National Party leadership election =

Scottish National Party (SNP) leadership election

- 2 June 1969
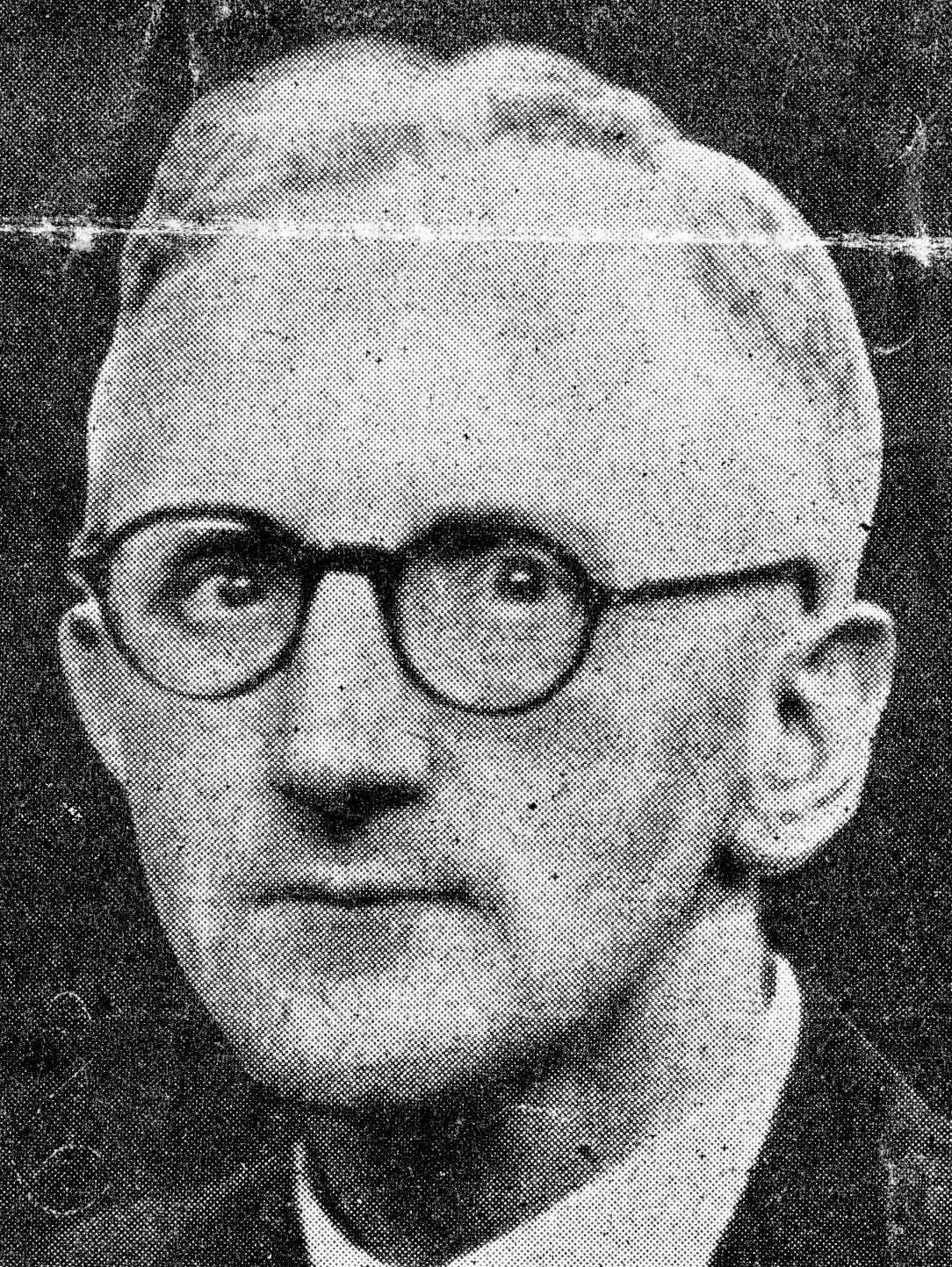
Candidate	William Wolfe	Arthur Donaldson
Popular vote	544	238
Percentage	69.6%	30.4%
Leader before election
Arthur Donaldson
Elected Leader
William Wolfe

There was a Scottish National Party leadership election in 1969. The election saw the incumbent Arthur Donaldson defeated by William Wolfe.

By 1969, Arthur Donaldson had been party leader for nine years, and was in his late 60s. Despite his success in growing the party, Donaldson was not without his critics, and at the 1967 SNP Annual Conference he had faced a leadership challenge from Douglas Drysdale, which he comfortably defeated.

In January 1969, Arthur Donaldson announced his intention to stand down from the SNP leadership. Many party members felt the SNP needed someone younger than Donaldson (then 68 years old) to lead the party. However, following a number of requests from SNP branches and members that he reconsider his decision to resign so close to a forthcoming general election, he decided to put himself forward for re-nomination as leader at the 1969 SNP Annual National Conference. At conference in June of that year, the SNP's deputy leader, William Wolfe, was elected as leader by 544 votes to 238 for Donaldson.

== Result ==
Candidate	Delegate votes	
Candidate	Votes	%
William Wolfe ✓	544	69.6%
Arthur Donaldson	238	30.4%
