= 55 Group =

Scottish internal body within the SNP (formed 1955)

The 55 Group were an internal body within the Scottish National Party (SNP) formed in 1955 (hence the name of the group).

This grouping started an organised campaign of internal dissent. This group was formed mainly of younger SNP members frustrated at the lack of electoral progress of the party in this period. There was also overt tones of anti-English sentiment amongst this grouping, epitomised by the publication of a leaflet The English: Are They Human?. This anti-English streak proved too much to bear for the SNP leadership and the 55 Group were expelled.

Some of their members went on to form a new political party, the Nationalist Party of Scotland (not to be confused with the earlier National Party of Scotland which merged with the Scottish Party in 1934 to form the SNP). This split in the SNP proved to be minor and involved only a few members, mainly located in the city of Edinburgh, and the new party made no impact whatsoever in the long-run.

The 55 Group are not the only organisation to have been proscribed by the SNP. In the early 1980s the 79 Group (like the 55 Group, named after the year they were formed, but unlike the 55 Group not an anti-English body, but a radical socialist organisation) and Siol nan Gaidheal were banned, and in more recent times they have banned their members from joining the Scottish Republican Socialist Movement.
