= Jimmy Halliday =

Scottish author, historian and politician (1927–2013)

James Halliday

Leader of the Scottish National Party
- In office May 1956 – May 1960
- Preceded by: Robert McIntyre
- Succeeded by: Arthur Donaldson

Personal details
- Born: 27 February 1927 Wemyss Bay, Renfrewshire, Scotland
- Died: 3 January 2013 (aged 85) Dundee, Scotland
- Party: Scottish National Party
- Spouse: Olive Campbell (m. 1955–2013)
- Children: 2
- Education: University of Glasgow
- Profession: Teacher, lecturer (History)

James Halliday (27 February 1927 – 3 January 2013) was a Scottish author, historian and politician. He was the chairman (leader) of the Scottish National Party (SNP) from 1956 to 1960.

== Early life ==
Halliday was born in Woodburn Cottage, Wemyss Bay, Renfrewshire, the son of James Wightman Halliday, an estate gardener. Halliday was educated at Skelmorlie Primary School and Greenock Academy. He joined the SNP in 1943, aged 16, and also registered for military service in World War II. Halliday began studying at the University of Glasgow in 1944, joining the Glasgow University Scottish Nationalist Association and playing an active part in union debates. Then tuberculosis of the spine left him unable to stand until 1947, and it was 1952 before he graduated.

== Educator ==
Halliday worked teaching history at Coatbridge High School, Uddingston Grammar School and Dunfermline High School. From 1967 to 1988 he taught at the Dundee College of Education, initially joining as a lecturer in history before becoming principal lecturer of history and head of department in 1979. He specialised in modern history and had a particular interest in the history, politics and constitution of the United States.

== Political office ==
In 1956, Halliday was elected leader of the SNP when Robert McIntyre decided to step down due to his belief that there was some opposition to him remaining leader amongst the party ranks. Although aged only 28, Halliday seemed the natural replacement as he had been the SNP parliamentary candidate for Stirling and Falkirk Burghs at the 1955 general election, and the only other SNP candidate besides McIntyre. Halliday contested the Stirling and Falkirk Burghs seat again at the 1959 general election and West Fife in 1970.

Halliday led the SNP for four years but felt he had to resign due to the pressures of working life. Halliday remained active in the SNP, and was a regular columnist for the Scots Independent newspaper and chairman of the company which publishes it.

== Personal life ==
In 1955 he married Olive Campbell and they had two sons.

== Published works ==
Source: Source:

- America (World in Transformation) (1970)
- Scotland: A Concise History (1990)
- 1820 Rising: The Radical War (1993)
- Yours for Scotland - a Memoir (2011)

Political offices
Preceded by Robert McIntyre	Chairman (Leader) of the Scottish National Party; 1956–1960	Succeeded by Arthur Donaldson
