= James C. Lees =

James Corson Lees (11 August 1912 – 8 June 2001) was a pathologist and Scottish nationalist politician.

== Biography ==
Lees was born in Newhaven, Edinburgh. His father died in a fishing accident while he was young. He studied at Trinity Academy and the University of Edinburgh qualifying as a medical doctor. He served in the military during World War II. He then worked in London as a pathologist at the London Cancer Hospital, before moving to laboratories in Kingston-upon-Thames as a histopathologist with an focus on cancer. Next, he became a lecturer in Texas, where he was made an honorary sheriff of Dallas. Much of his research was conducted with his brother Thomas W. Lees, a lecturer at the University of Edinburgh.

In 1962, Lees moved to Kirkcaldy and worked at the Victoria Hospital. He became active in the Scottish National Party (SNP), working closely with James Braid and Ian Macdonald to build up branches around the country. He stood unsuccessfully for the party in the 1963 Dundee West by-election, and then in Kirkcaldy Burghs at the 1964, 1966 and 1970 general elections. From 1966 until 1970, he served as a vice-chairman of the party, with responsibility for organisation.

In retirement, Lees was a director of and contributor to the Scots Independent newspaper.

Party political offices
Preceded by Douglas Drysdale	Scottish National Party Vice Chairman (Organisation); 1966–1970	Succeeded by Ian Macdonald
