= Arthur Donaldson =

Scottish journalist and politician

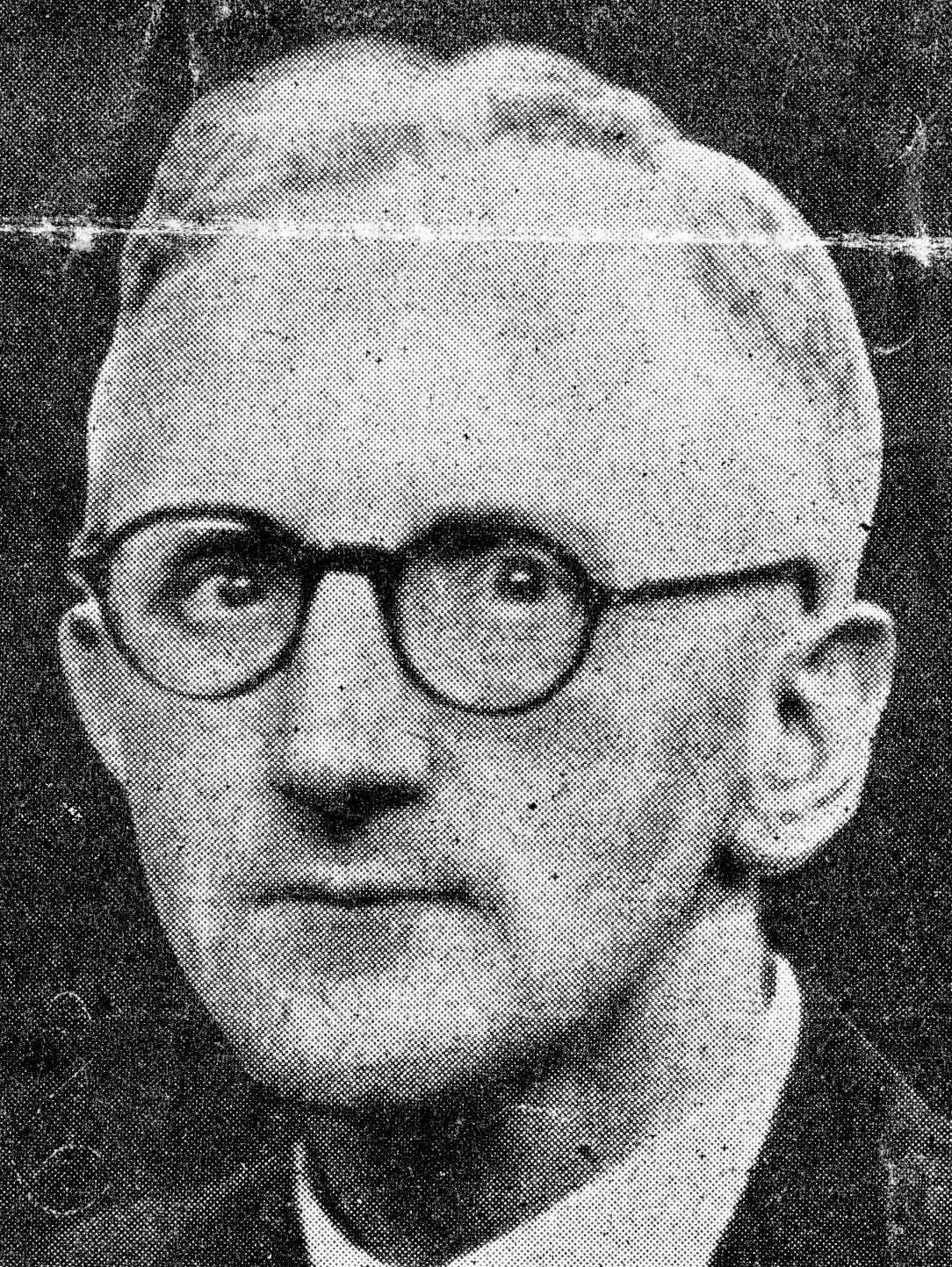
- Donaldson, c. 1945

Leader of the Scottish National Party
- In office 5 June 1960 – 1 June 1969
- Preceded by: Jimmy Halliday
- Succeeded by: William Wolfe

Personal details
- Born: Arthur William Donaldson; 13 December 1901 Dundee, Scotland
- Died: 18 January 1993 (aged 91) Forfar, Angus, Scotland
- Party: Scottish National Party
- Spouse: Violet Bruce (m. 1932–1993)
- Children: 2
- Education: Detroit Institute of Technology
- Profession: Journalist, Business executive, Farmer

Arthur William Donaldson (13 December 1901 – 18 January 1993) was a Scottish journalist and Scottish National Party (SNP) politician. He was leader of the Scottish National Party from 1960 to 1969.

== Early years ==
Donaldson was born in Dundee, the son of George Donaldson, a yarn dresser. He was educated at Harris Academy, leaving in 1917 with five Higher leaving certificate passes. After working as an assistant registrar of births, deaths and marriages in Dundee from 1918-20, he began a career in journalism as a reporter with The Courier, a Dundee newspaper. In 1923, he decided to emigrate to the United States to try his hand as a journalist there. Donaldson did not find work as a journalist and instead found employment in Detroit, MI as secretary to the head of an engineering department in the automotive industry, then attended the Detroit Institute of Technology to study engineering. He eventually became assistant secretary in the Chrysler Corporation's public procurement division, responsible for dealing with the United States Department of Defense.

Although now beginning to be established in the United States, Donaldson took a keen interest in the developing political movement for Scottish independence back home. To that end, in 1928 he joined the newly formed National Party of Scotland as an overseas member. In 1932, Donaldson married Violet "Vi" Bruce, another expatriate Scot (from Forfar) and they set up home in Washington D.C., where he continued to work for Chrysler. Donaldson joined the Scottish National Party in 1934, and three years later returned to Scotland with his family, settling at Lugton, Ayrshire, where he established a poultry farm. In 1944, he moved to his wife's native Forfar, where he worked in retail business and as a freelance journalist.

== Political career ==
Donaldson came into contact with Robert McIntyre, one of the leading members of the SNP, and his involvement with the party deepened.

In May 1941, during the Second World War, Donaldson's home was raided by the police, who suspected him and a number of other SNP figures of "subversive activities", due to their support for the Scottish Neutrality League. An informant of MI5 told the desk officer Richard Brooman-White that in the event of a German invasion of Britain, Donaldson had told him that he intended to set up a puppet government akin to that of Vidkun Quisling in Norway. As a result of this information, Donaldson was arrested and interned under Defence Regulation 18B, sent first to Kilmarnock Prison and then to Barlinnie Prison in Glasgow. He was held for six weeks. An MI5 file, published in 2005, outlined how Donaldson had revealed to a close confidant - who was also a British agent - that a network of Nazi sympathisers was planning to undermine the war effort. His United Scotland Movement was said to be contemplating "spreading confusion by false reports and minor acts of sabotage, and is in fact now endeavouring to start a whispering campaign to spread rumours, particularly of shipping losses". Donaldson was also recorded as saying that he believed a German invasion would be successful and that "The movement in Scotland must then be able to show the German government that it is organised and has a clear-cut policy, that it is not with England in the war."

Donaldson remained a member of the SNP throughout the 1940s and 1950s, when it was particularly weak and much of the focus of nationalist efforts was being invested in the Scottish Covenant of John MacCormick. MacCormick had left the SNP in 1942, as he had been unable to persuade the party to adopt a position of supporting devolution rather than independence, a split which Donaldson himself had put down more to a personality clash than to ideological differences.

After the split of 1942, Donaldson became a leading SNP figure, along with McIntyre. Donaldson stood as SNP candidate for Dundee at the 1945 general election, coming bottom of the poll with 7,775 votes. In 1948 he moved to Forfar, where he soon became editor of the Forfar Dispatch. He became active in local government in Angus, as a member of Forfar Town Council from 1945 to 1968, and as the town treasurer. He also served as a member of Angus County Council from 1946 to 1955. These commitments meant that Donaldson was not active in the general elections of 1950, 1951, and 1955, but in 1959 he fought the Kinross and Western Perthshire constituency.

== Leadership ==
Donaldson became SNP leader in June 1960, when he was elected unopposed, replacing James Halliday, and it was during his term as SNP leader that the party began to grow and impose itself on the Scottish political landscape. An inspirational speaker, he enthused supporters, touring branches and constituencies, and the party's growth in membership, branches, and votes throughout the decade was phenomenal. Donaldson was the SNP candidate opposing Sir Alec Douglas-Home in the Kinross and Western Perthshire by-election in November 1963, although he lost his deposit there. During his term of office the SNP began to perform credibly in elections, winning the 1967 Hamilton by-election, and polling more votes than any other party in the 1968 Scottish local authority elections. During his leadership, Donaldson stood as SNP parliamentary candidate for Kinross and Western Perthshire at the 1964 and 1966 general elections.

This success, however, did not leave Donaldson without his critics, and at the 1967 SNP Annual Conference he faced a leadership challenge from Douglas Drysdale, which he comfortably defeated. In January 1969, Donaldson announced his intention to stand down from the SNP leadership. It was felt by a large number of party members that the SNP needed someone younger than Donaldson (then 68 years old) to lead the party. However, following a number of requests from SNP branches and members that he reconsider his decision to resign so close to a forthcoming general election, he decided to put himself forward for re-nomination as leader at the 1969 SNP Annual National Conference. At conference in June of that year, the SNP's deputy leader, William Wolfe, was elected as leader by 544 votes to 238 for Donaldson.

He stood as SNP parliamentary candidate for Galloway at the 1970 general election, coming second. Donaldson remained active in the SNP at branch, constituency, and national level well into his eighties.

He died on 18 January 1993 at Forfar, aged 91.

Party political offices
Preceded by Jimmy Halliday	Chairman (Leader) of the Scottish National Party; 1960–1969	Succeeded by William Wolfe
Preceded by Margo MacDonald	Scottish National Party Vice Chairman (Policy); 1974–1975	Succeeded by Isobel Lindsay
