= It's Scotland's oil =

Political slogan relating to North Sea oil

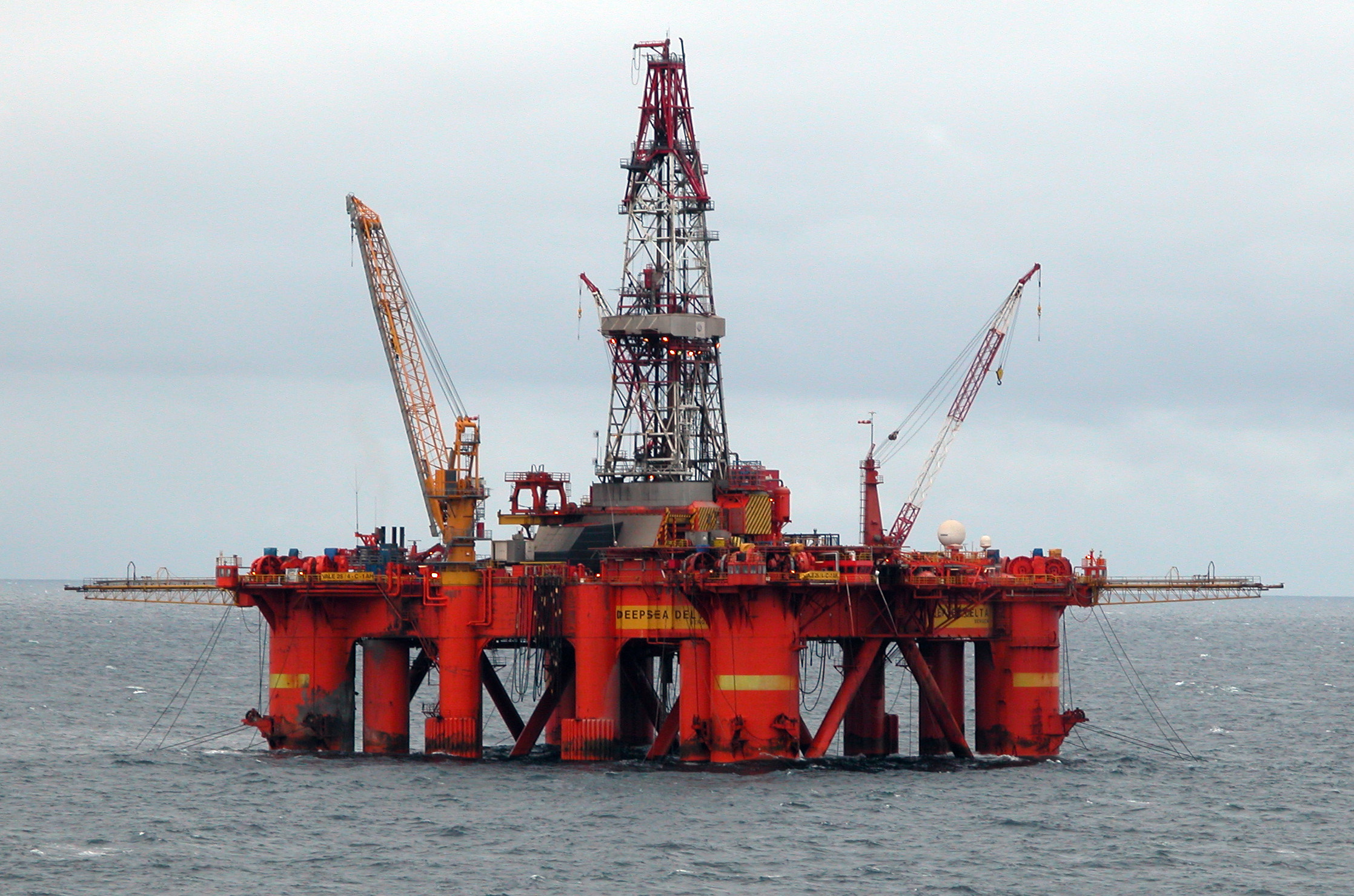
An oil drilling rig in the North Sea

"It's Scotland's oil" was a widely publicised political slogan used by the Scottish National Party (SNP) during the 1970s in making their economic case for Scottish independence. It was argued that the discovery of North Sea oil off the coast of Scotland, and the revenue that it created, would not benefit Scotland to any significant degree while Scotland remained part of the United Kingdom. The SNP campaigned widely in both the February 1974 UK General Election and subsequent October 1974 UK General Election using this slogan. At the February election the SNP gained seven seats in the House of Commons and 22% of the Scottish vote, rising to eleven seats and 30% of the vote in the October election. The idea behind the slogan has proven to be controversial in discussions surrounding the financial viability of an independent Scottish state and still resonates to this day.

== Background ==
The outcome of the February 1974 general election saw the Labour Party, led by Harold Wilson, win the most seats. Prime Minister Edward Heath, the leader of the Conservative Party, lost support from the Ulster Unionist Party. Although he entered coalition negotiations with the Liberal leader, Jeremy Thorpe, they broke down. The Labour Party then formed the new government with a plurality of seats but without a majority. In October 1974, Wilson held new elections to ask for a renewed mandate.

Support for the Scottish National Party had meanwhile been increasing in Scotland since the victory of the SNP candidate Winnie Ewing at the 1967 Hamilton by-election. The political instability surrounding the general elections of 1974 represented a time of intense political campaigning in the UK, which further brought the SNP to prominence. It was then that the slogan "It's Scotland's Oil" came to the fore with the February election seeing seven SNP candidates returned, which rose to 11 in October. Some well-known MPs such as Tam Dalyell believe that was in no small part because the SNP used the slogan "It's Scotland's oil".

The economic background to the claim was the discovery of oil in the North Sea in the 1960s and its production starting in the 1970s. Most of the largest oil fields in the UK sector of the North Sea were found in the waters to the north and east of the Scottish mainland, with the most northerly fields found to the east of the Orkney and the Shetland Islands. Aberdeen became the centre of Britain's North Sea oil industry, with many oil terminals such as that of Sullom Voe in Shetland and Flotta in Orkney and at Cruden Bay and St Fergus on the north-eastern coast of Scotland being built to support the North Sea oil industry. In the early 1970s, there was a great deal of economic turbulence with the 1973 oil price shock, which was caused by the Yom Kippur War. That resulted in rising inflation, high unemployment and a recession, a situation known as stagflation, in Scotland and the rest of the United Kingdom. Thus, the economic argument that formed the basis of the slogan was that while Scotland was part of the United Kingdom, it lacked control over royalties and the revenue from the majority of the oil, which lay in the Scottish sector of the North Sea.

== Reality of claim ==
Since Scotland is not a sovereign state, it has no effective maritime boundaries, and any claims that Scotland may assert are subsumed as part of claims made by the United Kingdom. However, the existence of two separate legal systems in Great Britain (that of Scots law pertaining to Scotland and English law pertaining to England and Wales) has caused constitutional law in the United Kingdom to provide for the division of the UK sector of the North Sea into specific Scottish and English components. The Continental Shelf Act 1964 and the Continental Shelf (Jurisdiction) Order 1968 defined the UK North Sea maritime area to the north of latitude 55 degrees north as being under the jurisdiction of Scots law and that 90% of UK oil resources were considered under Scottish jurisdiction. In addition, Section 126 of the Scotland Act 1998 defined Scottish waters as the internal waters and territorial sea of the United Kingdom as are adjacent to Scotland. That was subsequently amended by the Scottish Adjacent Waters Boundary Order 1999, which redefined the extent of Scottish waters and Scottish fishery limits.

Recent evidence by Kemp and Stephen (1999) has tried to estimate hypothetical Scottish shares of North Sea Oil revenue by dividing the UK sector of the North Sea into separate Scottish and English sectors by using the international principle of equidistance, as is used under the United Nations Convention on the Law of the Sea (UNCLOS). That convention is used in defining the maritime assets of newly-formed states and in resolving international maritime disputes. The study by Kemp & Stephen showed that hypothesised Scottish shares of North Sea oil revenue over the period 1970 to 1999 varied depending upon the price of oil and was offset against taxable profits and the costs of exploration and development.

Nevertheless, a Scottish share of North Sea oil is never formally alluded to as part of Scotland's net fiscal position and is treated by HM Treasury as extra-regio resources. The BBC economist Evan Davis, however, reported prior to the 2007 Scottish Parliament election that the Barnett formula already allows Scotland to sustain higher levels of per capita public spending than the rest of the UK, which is approximately equivalent to its disproportionately high annual contribution of tax revenues to the central UK Treasury from oil production. However Scotland's per capita spending growth, relative to the rest of the UK, has in recent years been nominally reduced by the operation of the Barnett formula to bring public spending levels into line with the UK average in a phenomenon that had been dubbed the "Barnett Squeeze".

== Claims by Shetland and Orkney ==
There have been moves to recast the constitutional status of Orkney, Shetland and the Western Isles partly to get a greater share of the oil revenues to these islands in whose maritime territory it is argued that most of the oil is found.

However, that view may not be accurate; the islands would likely obtain a modest EEZ within a wider Scottish EEZ like the Canada–France Maritime Boundary Case.

== Scottish independence referendum ==
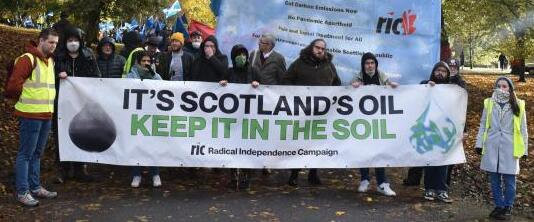
A banner by the Radical Independence Campaign at COP26 in 2021

Jim Sillars, former Deputy Leader of the Scottish National Party, said during the 2014 Scottish independence referendum, BP, in an independent Scotland, will need to learn the meaning of nationalisation, in part or in whole, as it has in other countries who have not been as soft as we have forced to be. We will be the masters of the oil fields, not BP or any other of the majors".

== See also ==
- Economy of Scotland
- History of the Scottish National Party

== Bibliography ==
- Murkens, J, Jones, P & Keating, M (2002) Scottish independence - A Practical Guide. Edinburgh University Press. Edinburgh.
- Kemp, A.G & Stephen, L (1999) Expenditures and Revenues from the UKCS - Estimating the hypothetical Scottish Shares 1970-2003 North Sea Study Occasional Paper No. 70. Department of Economics. University of Aberdeen.
- Shepherd, M. Oil Strike North Sea: A first-hand history of North Sea oil. Luath Press. 2015.
- Wälde, T. Thomas W. Wälde Scotland's Oil Does it have a future?, published oinline at https://web.archive.org/web/20070929134513/http://www.dundee.ac.uk/cepmlp/journal/html/Vol14/Vol14_5.pdf, accessed 20 September 2007.
