= Robert McIntyre (politician) =

Scottish Nationalist

Robert McIntyre MB ChB DPH JP

President of the Scottish National Party
- In office May 1958 – May 1980
- Preceded by: Tom Gibson
- Succeeded by: William Wolfe

Leader of the Scottish National Party
- In office May 1947 – May 1956
- Preceded by: Bruce Watson
- Succeeded by: James Halliday

Member of Parliament for Motherwell
- In office 12 April 1945 – 15 June 1945
- Preceded by: James Walker
- Succeeded by: Alexander Anderson

Personal details
- Born: 15 December 1913 Motherwell, Lanarkshire, Scotland
- Died: 2 February 1998 (aged 84) Stirling, Scotland
- Party: Scottish National Party (1940–1998)
- Other political affiliations: Labour (1936–1940)
- Spouse: Letitia Macleod (m. 1954)
- Children: 1
- Education: University of Edinburgh; University of Glasgow
- Profession: Physician

Robert Douglas McIntyre (15 December 1913 – 2 February 1998) was a Scottish physician and a Scottish National Party politician and Member of Parliament.

McIntyre studied medicine at the University of Edinburgh and the University of Glasgow, and worked as a GP and a consultant pulmonologist. He came to political prominence in 1945 when he won the Motherwell by-election, becoming the SNP's first ever Member of Parliament.

McIntyre served as the Leader of the Scottish National Party from 1947 to 1956, and as President of the SNP from 1958 to 1980. He was the Provost of Stirling from 1967 to 1975. Known affectionately as "Doc Mac", he was often referred to as the "Father of the SNP".

== Early life and medical career ==
McIntyre was born in Motherwell, the son of John Ebenezer McIntyre, a minister of the United Free Church of Scotland. He was educated at Hamilton Academy and Daniel Stewart's College. After a short period working at an accountants' office, McIntyre managed to acquire the necessary qualifications to attend the University of Edinburgh, where he initially studied Chemistry, before switching to study Medicine.

At university, he was Chairman of the University Labour Party and an active member of Edinburgh University Socialist Society. He also served as the University Labour Party's delegate on the Edinburgh Trades and Labour Council in 1935.

In December 1938, McIntyre graduated with an MB ChB, and joined a general practice in Warwick, England as an assistant. Following brief spells as a General practitioner in Musselburgh and Polmont, he served as a house surgeon at Stirling Royal Infirmary, and then as House Physician at Bangour Village Hospital. In this period, he developed an interest in the area of public health and studied at the University of Glasgow to gain a Diploma in Public Health. After qualifying, McIntyre was appointed as Senior Resident at Hawkhead Hospital in Paisley; a hospital for infectious diseases. The early-1940s witnessed a dramatic increase in the confirmed cases of diphtheria in Scotland. McIntyre was in charge of a major campaign of diphtheria immunisation directed at Paisley's schoolchildren, visiting every school in the area to persuade the children and their parents to get themselves vaccinated against the lethal disease.

Robert McIntyre then took up a position under Glasgow Corporation's Department of Health as Port Boarding Medical Officer, based at Greenock. This involved his being part of a team which had the responsibility of ensuring that ships were free of infections before they proceeded up the River Clyde to Glasgow, and also liaising with the vessels' medical staff.

Following his defeat at the 1945 general election, he served for a short period as a locum GP on North Uist, before obtaining a position with Stirling County Council as a Tuberculosis Officer responsible to the Medical Officer for Health. With the creation of the National Health Service in 1948, McIntyre was appointed as Consultant Chest Physician at Stirling Royal Infirmary. He would remain in the post until his retirement.

== Political career ==
McIntyre had joined the Labour Party in 1936, and was active in Labour politics at Edinburgh University. However, he had become increasingly disillusioned with the Labour Party's commitment to Scottish home rule and had been disappointed when he and his fellow students at the Edinburgh University Labour Party had sent a resolution to the Scottish Council of the Labour Party, only to be informed that the council was not involved in the formation of Labour Party policy. Steeped in Scottish history and culture, he believed in the right of small nations to self-government.

In 1940, McIntyre joined the Scottish National Party and became the party's membership secretary when it was still headed by John MacCormick, but he resisted MacCormick's later attempts to change the SNP from supporting a policy of full Scottish independence to supporting a modicum of home rule. MacCormick would leave the SNP in 1942 from which point McIntyre became the party's leading figure, serving as National Secretary (1942-1945) and as vice-chairman (1945-1947), before being chosen as Chairman (leader) of the SNP in May 1947.

On 13 April 1945, shortly before the end of World War II, McIntyre won the Motherwell by-election, with a narrow majority of 617 votes over his Labour opponent. He made history as the first SNP candidate to be elected as a Member of Parliament. Upon arriving at Parliament, he had difficulty finding the customary two sponsors to allow him to take his seat, as members did not want to break party loyalties. Two reluctant sponsors were found but McIntyre chose to present himself to the Speaker alone, later writing "I very clearly stated to the people of Motherwell and Wishaw that I would give no allegiance to the London-controlled parties". A vote to waive the rule was lost, and eventually he accepted the sponsorship of James Barr and Alexander Sloan "under protest".

He lost the seat only three months later at the 1945 general election, to the Labour Party. He then returned to his medical practice, working in Stirling Royal Infirmary to treat and prevent tuberculosis. However, he continued to stand at every subsequent general election, up to October 1974, also standing at a by-election in 1971, thirteen in total, the most unsuccessful attempts by a former MP to be re-elected to the UK Parliament.

After McIntyre stood down as party leader in 1956, he was elected as President of the Scottish National Party, holding this office until 1980. In 1956, he was also elected as a member of Stirling Burgh Council, a position he held until 1975. He was Provost of Stirling from 1967 to 1975. McIntyre was first (and last) vice-president of the Celtic League (from 1961 to 1971). Gwynfor Evans was president at the time.

In 1962 he was nominated by the Scottish Nationalist Association as a candidate for Rector of the University of Glasgow, where he finished second behind Albert Luthuli who was then the President of the African National Congress.

== Personal life ==
McIntyre married Letitia Macleod in 1954 and they had one son together.

Robert McIntyre died on 2 February 1998, aged 84.

== See also ==
- List of United Kingdom MPs with the shortest service

Parliament of the United Kingdom
Preceded by James Walker	Member of Parliament for Motherwell; April 1945–July 1945	Succeeded by Alexander Anderson
Party political offices
Preceded by John MacCormick	National Secretary of the Scottish National Party; 1942–1947	Succeeded by Mary Fraser Dott
Preceded by Bruce Watson	Chairman (Leader) of the Scottish National Party; 1947–1956	Succeeded by Jimmy Halliday
Preceded by Tom Gibson	President of the Scottish National Party; 1958–80	Succeeded by William Wolfe
