= Scottish National Party election results =

This article lists the Scottish National Party's election results in UK parliamentary elections.

== Summary of general election performance ==
| Year | Number of Candidates | Total votes | Average votes per candidate | % UK vote | % Scottish vote | Change (percentage points) | Saved deposits | Number of MPs |
|---|---|---|---|---|---|---|---|---|
| 1935 | 8 | 29,517 | 3,690 | 0.2 | 1.3 | N/A | 3 | 0 |
| 1945 | 8 | 26,707 | 3,338 | 0.1 | 1.2 | −0.1 | 2 | 0 |
| 1950 | 3 | 9,708 | 2,427 | 0.0 | 0.4 | −0.1 | 0 | 0 |
| 1951 | 2 | 7,299 | 3,650 | 0.0 | 0.3 | 0.0 | 1 | 0 |
| 1955 | 2 | 12,112 | 6,056 | 0.1 | 0.5 | +0.1 | 1 | 0 |
| 1959 | 5 | 21,738 | 4,348 | 0.1 | 0.5 | 0.0 | 2 | 0 |
| 1964 | 15 | 64,044 | 4,270 | 0.2 | 2.4 | +0.1 | 3 | 0 |
| 1966 | 23 | 128,474 | 5,586 | 0.5 | 5.0 | +0.3 | 13 | 0 |
| 1970 | 65 | 306,802 | 4,720 | 1.1 | 11.4 | +0.6 | 22 | 1 |
| 1974 Feb | 70 | 632,572 | 9,037 | 2.0 | 21.9 | +0.9 | 63 | 7 |
| 1974 Oct | 71 | 839,628 | 11,826 | 2.9 | 30.4 | +0.9 | 71 | 11 |
| 1979 | 71 | 504,259 | 7,102 | 1.6 | 17.3 | −1.3 | 29 | 2 |
| 1983 | 72 | 331,975 | 4,611 | 1.1 | 11.7 | −0.5 | 19 | 2 |
| 1987 | 71 | 416,873 | 5,871 | 1.3 | 14.0 | +0.2 | 70 | 3 |
| 1992 | 72 | 629,564 | 8,744 | 1.9 | 21.5 | +0.6 | 72 | 3 |
| 1997 | 72 | 621,550 | 8,633 | 2.0 | 22.1 | +0.1 | 72 | 6 |
| 2001 | 72 | 464,314 | 6,449 | 1.8 | 20.1 | −0.2 | 72 | 5 |
| 2005 | 59 | 412,267 | 6,988 | 1.5 | 17.7 | −0.3 | 59 | 6 |
| 2010 | 59 | 491,386 | 8,330 | 1.7 | 19.9 | +0.2 | 59 | 6 |
| 2015 | 59 | 1,454,436 | 24,651 | 4.7 | 50.0 | +3.0 | 59 | 56 |
| 2017 | 59 | 977,568 | 16,569 | 3.0 | 36.9 | -1.7 | 59 | 35 |
| 2019 | 59 | 1,242,372 | 21,057 | 3.9 | 45.0 | +1.9 | 59 | 48 |
| 2024 | 57 | 724,758 | 12,715 | 2.5 | 30.0 | +15 | 59 | 9 |

== Election results ==
=== 1935 general election ===
| Constituency | Candidate | Votes | % | Position |
|---|---|---|---|---|
| Combined Scottish Universities | Andrew Dewar Gibb | 3,865 | 14.2 | 4 |
| Dunbartonshire | Robert Gray | 3,841 | 7.1 | 3 |
| East Renfrewshire | Oliver Brown | 6,593 | 10.4 | 3 |
| Greenock | John L. Kinloch | 1,286 | 3.3 | 3 |
| Kilmarnock | T. W. Campbell | 2,346 | 6.2 | 4 |
| Inverness | John MacCormick | 4,273 | 16.1 | 3 |
| Western Isles | Alexander MacEwen | 3,704 | 28.1 | 3 |
| West Renfrewshire | Roland Muirhead | 3,697 | 11.5 | 3 |

=== By-elections, 1935–45 ===
| Election | Candidate | Votes | % | Position |
|---|---|---|---|---|
| 1936 Combined Scottish Universities by-election | Andrew Dewar Gibb | 9,034 | 31.1 | 2 |
| 1936 Dunbartonshire by-election | Robert Gray | 2,599 | 6.2 | 3 |
| 1937 Glasgow Hillhead by-election | John MacCormick | 1,886 | 8.5 | 3 |
| 1938 Combined Scottish Universities by-election | Andrew Dewar Gibb | 5,246 | 18.2 | 3 |
| 1940 Argyll by-election | William Power | 7,308 | 37.2 | 2 |
| 1942 Glasgow Cathcart by-election | William Whyte | 1,000 | 5.5 | 4 |
| 1944 Kirkcaldy Burghs by-election | Douglas Young | 6,621 | 41.3 | 2 |
| 1945 Motherwell by-election | Robert McIntyre | 11,417 | 51.4 | 1 |

=== 1945 general election ===
| Constituency | Candidate | Votes | % | Position |
|---|---|---|---|---|
| Aberdeen North | Austin Walker | 2,021 | 5.3 | 3 |
| Dundee | Arthur Donaldson | 7,775 | 4.6 | 5 |
| Edinburgh East | Frederick Yeaman | 2,149 | 6.3 | 3 |
| Glasgow Kelvingrove | Christopher Murray Grieve | 1,314 | 4.9 | 3 |
| Kirkcaldy Burghs | Douglas Young | 5,811 | 17.0 | 3 |
| Motherwell | Robert McIntyre | 8,022 | 26.7 | 2 |
| Perth | James Blair Brown | 1,547 | 4.3 | 3 |
| West Renfrewshire | Robert Wilkie | 1,955 | 6.3 | 3 |

=== By-elections, 1945–50 ===
| Election | Candidate | Votes | % | Position |
|---|---|---|---|---|
| 1946 Glasgow Cathcart by-election | William Taylor | 2,700 | 10.4 | 3 |
| 1946 Kilmarnock by-election | George Dott | 2,932 | 7.8 | 3 |
| 1947 Edinburgh East by-election | Mary Fraser Dott | 1,682 | 5.0 | 4 |
| 1948 Glasgow Camlachie by-election | Robert Wilkie | 1,302 | 5.2 | 4 |
| 1948 Stirling and Falkirk by-election | Robert Curran | 2,831 | 8.1 | 3 |

=== 1950 general election ===
| Constituency | Candidate | Votes | % | Position |
|---|---|---|---|---|
| Motherwell | Robert McIntyre | 3,892 | 9.3 | 3 |
| Perth and East Perthshire | Donald Stewart | 4,118 | 9.3 | 3 |
| Stirling and Falkirk Burghs | Robert Curran | 1,698 | 3.8 | 3 |

=== 1951 general election ===
| Constituency | Candidate | Votes | % | Position |
|---|---|---|---|---|
| Perth and East Perthshire | Robert McIntyre | 6,479 | 14.9 | 3 |
| Western Isles | Calum Maclean | 820 | 5.0 | 4 |

=== By-elections, 1951–55 ===
| Constituency | Candidate | Votes | % | Position |
|---|---|---|---|---|
| 1952 Dundee East by-election | Donald Stewart | 2,931 | 7.5 | 3 |

=== 1955 general election ===
| Constituency | Candidate | Votes | % | Position |
|---|---|---|---|---|
| Perth and East Perthshire | Robert McIntyre | 9,227 | 22.8 | 2 |
| Stirling and Falkirk Burghs | Jimmy Halliday | 2,885 | 6.6 | 3 |

=== 1959 general election ===
| Constituency | Candidate | Votes | % | Position |
|---|---|---|---|---|
| Aberdeen North | Sandy Milne | 2,964 | 5.8 | 3 |
| Hamilton | David Rollo | 2,586 | 6.2 | 3 |
| Kinross and West Perthshire | Arthur Donaldson | 3,568 | 15.0 | 3 |
| Perth and East Perthshire | Robert McIntyre | 9,637 | 23.1 | 2 |
| Stirling and Falkirk Burghs | Jimmy Halliday | 2,983 | 6.6 | 3 |

=== By-elections, 1959–64 ===
| Constituency | Candidate | Votes | % | Position |
|---|---|---|---|---|
| 1961 Glasgow Bridgeton by-election | Ian Macdonald | 3,549 | 18.7 | 3 |
| 1962 West Lothian by-election | William Wolfe | 9,750 | 23.3 | 2 |
| 1962 Glasgow Woodside by-election | Alan Niven | 2,562 | 11.2 | 4 |
| 1963 Kinross and Western Perthshire by-election | Arthur Donaldson | 1,801 | 7.3 | 4 |
| 1963 Dundee West by-election | James C. Lees | 3,285 | 7.4 | 3 |
| 1963 Dumfriesshire by-election | John Gair | 4,001 | 9.7 | 4 |

=== 1964 general election ===
| Constituency | Candidate | Votes | % | Position |
|---|---|---|---|---|
| Aberdeen South | John B. Reid | 3,898 | 7.6 | 3 |
| Clackmannan and Eastern Stirlingshire | Douglas Drysdale | 5,106 | 12.2 | 3 |
| Dumfries | John Gair | 5,726 | 12.2 | 3 |
| East Aberdeenshire | Bruce Cockie | 1,925 | 6.3 | 4 |
| East Fife | James Braid | 2,635 | 6.8 | 4 |
| Glasgow Springburn | Angus McIntosh | 2,366 | 9.2 | 3 |
| Glasgow Woodside | David Stevenson | 1,600 | 5.1 | 4 |
| Kinross and West Perthshire | Arthur Donaldson | 3,552 | 14.1 | 3 |
| Kirkcaldy Burghs | James C. Lees | 4,423 | 10.9 | 3 |
| Perth and East Perthshire | Robert McIntyre | 7,186 | 17.4 | 3 |
| Roxburgh, Selkirk and Peebles | Anthony J. C. Kerr | 1,093 | 2.5 | 4 |
| Rutherglen | R. N. Armstrong | 1,657 | 4.6 | 3 |
| Stirling and Falkirk | Sandy Milne | 4,526 | 10.0 | 3 |
| West Dunbartonshire | Alexander Gray | 5,004 | 12.1 | 3 |
| West Lothian | William Wolfe | 15,087 | 30.5 | 2 |

=== 1966 general election ===
| Constituency | Candidate | Votes | % | Position |
|---|---|---|---|---|
| Clackmannan and Eastern Stirlingshire | Douglas Drysdale | 8,225 | 20.1 | 3 |
| Dumfries | John Gair | 5,727 | 12.6 | 3 |
| Dunfermline | James A. Cook | 5,304 | 15.0 | 3 |
| East Aberdeenshire | Bruce Cockie | 2,584 | 8.8 | 4 |
| East Dunbartonshire | W. Johnston | 5,715 | 9.0 | 3 |
| East Fife | James Braid | 5,394 | 14.4 | 3 |
| Edinburgh South | H. M. Robertson | 2,856 | 7.3 | 3 |
| Glasgow Craigton | George Leslie | 3,425 | 9.4 | 3 |
| Glasgow Maryhill | Hugh MacDonald | 3,387 | 11.5 | 3 |
| Glasgow Shettleston | William Lindsay | 3,732 | 12.1 | 3 |
| Glasgow Springburn | William Morton | 2,222 | 9.4 | 3 |
| Glasgow Woodside | R. Fairlie | 1,916 | 7.2 | 3 |
| Kinross and West Perthshire | Arthur Donaldson | 4,884 | 20.5 | 2 |
| Kirkcaldy Burghs | James C. Lees | 5,223 | 13.4 | 3 |
| Lanark | Harry Rankin | 5,838 | 10.1 | 3 |
| Midlothian | Steven Rae | 7,794 | 16.4 | 3 |
| Perth and East Perthshire | Malcolm Shaw | 6,128 | 15.6 | 3 |
| Rutherglen | A. Peacock | 2,194 | 6.4 | 3 |
| Stirling and Falkirk | Sandy Milne | 6,322 | 14.4 | 3 |
| West Dunbartonshire | Robert Campbell | 6,042 | 14.6 | 3 |
| West Fife | R. Reid Patrick | 6,046 | 14.1 | 3 |
| West Lothian | William Wolfe | 17,955 | 35.3 | 2 |
| West Stirlingshire | Robert McIntyre | 9,381 | 26.0 | 2 |

=== By-elections, 1966–70 ===
| Constituency | Candidate | Votes | % | Position |
|---|---|---|---|---|
| 1967 Glasgow Pollok by-election | George Leslie | 10,884 | 28.2 | 3 |
| 1967 Hamilton by-election | Winifred Ewing | 18,397 | 46.0 | 1 |
| 1969 Glasgow Gorbals by-election | Tom Brady | 3,671 | 25.0 | 2 |
| 1970 South Ayrshire by-election | Sam Purdie | 7,785 | 19.9 | 3 |

=== 1970 general election ===
| Constituency | Candidate | Votes | % | Position |
|---|---|---|---|---|
| Aberdeen North | John McKenna | 3,756 | 8.4 | 3 |
| Aberdeen South | Bruce Cockie | 2,777 | 5.3 | 4 |
| Argyll | Iain MacCormick | 9,039 | 29.9 | 2 |
| Ayr | L. Anderson | 2,186 | 5.2 | 3 |
| Banffshire | Hamish Watt | 5,006 | 22.9 | 2 |
| Berwick and East Lothian | David Simpson | 4,735 | 10.2 | 3 |
| Bothwell | Thomas McAlpine | 6,157 | 12.8 | 3 |
| Bute and North Ayrshire | Peggy Macrae | 3,852 | 10.9 | 3 |
| Caithness and Sutherland | Donald Barr | 3,690 | 15.4 | 4 |
| Central Ayrshire | A. MacDonald | 2,383 | 5.1 | 3 |
| Clackmannan and Eastern Stirlingshire | Ian Macdonald | 7,243 | 15.5 | 3 |
| Coatbridge and Airdrie | Wolseley Brown | 2,667 | 6.0 | 3 |
| Dumfriesshire | John Gair | 6,211 | 13.4 | 3 |
| Dundee East | Ian Macaulay | 4,181 | 8.9 | 3 |
| Dundee West | J. A. Shepherd | 4,441 | 8.7 | 3 |
| Dunfermline Burghs | James Cook | 5,304 | 15.0 | 3 |
| East Aberdeenshire | Alex Farquhar | 9,377 | 29.8 | 2 |
| East Dunbartonshire | Gordon Murray | 8,257 | 11.3 | 3 |
| East Fife | James Braid | 4,666 | 11.8 | 3 |
| East Renfrewshire | J. M. Buchanan | 3,733 | 6.7 | 4 |
| Edinburgh Central | C. Moore | 1,666 | 8.0 | 3 |
| Edinburgh East | Helena Davidson | 3,502 | 8.2 | 3 |
| Edinburgh Leith | M. G. Thomson | 1,827 | 7.0 | 3 |
| Edinburgh Pentlands | Steven Rae | 2,814 | 5.9 | 4 |
| Edinburgh South | David Stevenson | 2,861 | 6.9 | 4 |
| Edinburgh West | Muriel Gibson | 3,711 | 6.8 | 4 |
| Galloway | Arthur Donaldson | 5,723 | 20.6 | 2 |
| Glasgow Bridgeton | G. E. J. Wallace | 1,550 | 8.8 | 3 |
| Glasgow Central | Angus McIntosh | 1,688 | 14.1 | 3 |
| Glasgow Craigton | R. Edwards | 2,946 | 7.9 | 3 |
| Glasgow Gorbals | Tom Brady | 1,089 | 7.4 | 3 |
| Glasgow Govan | Michael Grieve | 2,294 | 10.3 | 3 |
| Glasgow Hillhead | George Wotherspoon | 1,957 | 8.2 | 3 |
| Glasgow Maryhill | Cameron Aitken | 3,273 | 11.4 | 3 |
| Glasgow Pollok | George Leslie | 3,733 | 8.9 | 3 |
| Glasgow Provan | Willie McRae | 4,181 | 9.8 | 3 |
| Glasgow Scotstoun | A. Mitchell | 4,313 | 9.4 | 3 |
| Glasgow Shettleston | William Lindsay | 3,995 | 13.4 | 3 |
| Glasgow Springburn | William J. Morton | 3,323 | 14.3 | 3 |
| Glasgow Woodside | David Rollo | 1,912 | 8.4 | 3 |
| Hamilton | Winifred Ewing | 16,849 | 35.1 | 2 |
| Inverness | A. C. Cameron | 2,781 | 7.1 | 4 |
| Kilmarnock | Alistair MacInnes | 2,836 | 6.9 | 3 |
| Kinross and West Perthshire | Elizabeth Whitley | 4,670 | 18.6 | 2 |
| Kirkcaldy Burghs | James C. Lees | 4,863 | 11.9 | 3 |
| Lanark | Harry Rankin | 7,859 | 11.7 | 3 |
| Midlothian | George Park | 9,047 | 15.6 | 3 |
| Moray and Nairn | Thomas Howe | 7,885 | 27.8 | 2 |
| Motherwell | Isobel Lindsay | 3,861 | 9.9 | 3 |
| North Angus and Mearns | James McGuigan | 4,677 | 16.9 | 3 |
| North Lanarkshire | John Hutchison | 3,486 | 8.2 | 3 |
| Paisley | Margo MacDonald | 3,432 | 7.3 | 3 |
| Perth and East Perthshire | Duncan Murray | 7,112 | 17.0 | 3 |
| Ross and Cromarty | George Nicholson | 2,268 | 11.7 | 4 |
| Roxburgh, Selkirk and Peebles | H. Hastie | 3,147 | 6.8 | 4 |
| South Angus | Malcolm Slesser | 8,406 | 23.1 | 2 |
| South Ayrshire | Sam Purdie | 7,785 | 19.9 | 3 |
| Stirling and Falkirk | Iain Murray | 6,571 | 14.5 | 3 |
| West Aberdeenshire | John McKinlay | 2,112 | 5.3 | 4 |
| West Dunbartonshire | Robert Campbell | 5,414 | 12.0 | 3 |
| Western Isles | Donald Stewart | 6,568 | 43.1 | 1 |
| West Fife | Jimmy Halliday | 5,286 | 11.0 | 3 |
| West Lothian | William Wolfe | 15,620 | 28.2 | 2 |
| West Renfrewshire | Allan Macartney | 4,195 | 8.8 | 3 |
| West Stirlingshire | Robert McIntyre | 8,279 | 21.4 | 3 |

=== By-elections, 1970–74 ===
| By-election | Candidate | Votes | % | Position |
|---|---|---|---|---|
| 1971 Stirling and Falkirk by-election | Robert McIntyre | 13,048 | 34.6 | 2 |
| 1973 Dundee East by-election | Gordon Wilson | 13,270 | 30.2 | 2 |
| 1973 Edinburgh North by-election | William Wolfe | 3,526 | 19.1 | 3 |
| 1973 Glasgow Govan by-election | Margo MacDonald | 6,360 | 41.5 | 1 |

=== February 1974 general election ===
| Constituency | Candidate | Votes | % | Position |
|---|---|---|---|---|
| Aberdeen North | James McGugan | 11,337 | 23.3 | 2 |
| Aberdeen South | Sandy Stronach | 7,599 | 13.7 | 3 |
| Argyll | Iain MacCormick | 15,646 | 48.9 | 1 |
| Ayr | C. D. Caldman | 4,706 | 11.0 | 3 |
| Banffshire | Hamish Watt | 11,037 | 46.1 | 1 |
| Berwick and East Lothian | David Simpson | 6,956 | 14.2 | 3 |
| Bothwell | Gerry Fisher | 6,710 | 14.1 | 3 |
| Bute and North Ayrshire | John Murphy | 6,104 | 16.3 | 3 |
| Caithness and Sutherland | Eric Sutherland | 3,814 | 16.1 | 4 |
| Central Ayrshire | Leslie Anderson | 7,255 | 15.0 | 3 |
| Central Dunbartonshire | Andrew Welsh | 5,906 | 14.5 | 4 |
| Central Fife | David Livingstone | 10,324 | 22.5 | 2 |
| Clackmannan and Eastern Stirlingshire | George Reid | 22,289 | 43.5 | 1 |
| Coatbridge and Airdrie | R. Hill | 7,961 | 17.3 | 3 |
| Dumfriesshire | L. A. B. Whitley | 9,186 | 18.6 | 3 |
| Dundee East | Gordon Wilson | 20,066 | 39.5 | 1 |
| Dundee West | Jim Fairlie | 12,959 | 25.1 | 3 |
| Dunfermline | R. R. Patrick | 8,695 | 17.8 | 3 |
| East Aberdeenshire | Douglas Henderson | 18,333 | 50.8 | 1 |
| East Dunbartonshire | Margaret Bain | 11,635 | 22.3 | 3 |
| East Fife | James Braid | 8,593 | 19.5 | 2 |
| East Kilbride | D. P. MacQuarie | 13,819 | 25.9 | 3 |
| East Renfrewshire | S. Watterson | 5,268 | 10.4 | 4 |
| Edinburgh Central | A. W. S. Rae | 4,074 | 13.6 | 4 |
| Edinburgh East | G. MacDougall | 7,128 | 15.4 | 3 |
| Edinburgh Leith | H. Miller | 6,569 | 21.2 | 3 |
| Edinburgh North | J. Lynch | 4,550 | 12.7 | 4 |
| Edinburgh Pentlands | T. Forrest | 5,491 | 12.5 | 4 |
| Edinburgh South | R. Shirley | 5,770 | 12.8 | 4 |
| Edinburgh West | R. Moore | 4,241 | 9.9 | 4 |
| Galloway | George Thompson | 9,308 | 30.7 | 2 |
| Glasgow Cathcart | Alex Ewing | 5,410 | 13.6 | 3 |
| Glasgow Central | S. Ewing | 2,211 | 13.8 | 3 |
| Glasgow Craigton | G. Hooston | 6,303 | 17.9 | 3 |
| Glasgow Garscadden | M. McRury | 8,789 | 21.9 | 3 |
| Glasgow Govan | Margo MacDonald | 9,783 | 40.9 | 2 |
| Glasgow Hillhead | Keith Bovey | 3,702 | 11.3 | 4 |
| Glasgow Kelvingrove | C. MacKellar | 5,666 | 19.2 | 3 |
| Glasgow Maryhill | A. MacIntosh | 8,920 | 24.9 | 2 |
| Glasgow Pollok | M. D'Arcy Conyers | 6,584 | 14.4 | 3 |
| Glasgow Provan | R. Edwards | 7,367 | 19.6 | 2 |
| Glasgow Queen's Park | David MacKellar | 4,394 | 15.6 | 3 |
| Glasgow Shettleston | W. Lindsay | 5,834 | 22.0 | 3 |
| Glasgow Springburn | William J. Morton | 7,672 | 22.8 | 2 |
| Greenock and Port Glasgow | J. K. Wright | 4,881 | 11.5 | 4 |
| Hamilton | Ian Macdonald | 12,692 | 31.9 | 2 |
| Inverness | Rob Gibson | 7,258 | 16.6 | 4 |
| Kilmarnock | A. MacInnes | 7,644 | 15.3 | 3 |
| Kinross and Western Perthshire | Duncan Murray | 6,274 | 23.1 | 2 |
| Kirkcaldy | Roger Knox | 12,311 | 25.7 | 3 |
| Lanark | Thomas McAlpine | 8,803 | 21.8 | 3 |
| Midlothian | John McKinlay | 19,450 | 27.0 | 3 |
| Moray and Nairn | Winnie Ewing | 16,046 | 49.3 | 1 |
| Motherwell and Wishaw | G. Nicholson | 7,852 | 20.0 | 3 |
| North Angus and Mearns | Harry Rankin | 6,837 | 23.4 | 2 |
| North Lanarkshire | P. Watt | 8,187 | 18.5 | 3 |
| Paisley | David Rollo | 10,455 | 21.3 | 3 |
| Perth and Kinross | Douglas Crawford | 12,192 | 27.2 | 2 |
| Ross and Cromarty | Willie McRae | 5,037 | 23.0 | 2 |
| Roxburgh, Selkirk and Peebles | D. Purves | 3,953 | 8.0 | 3 |
| Rutherglen | L. Leslie | 6,089 | 15.2 | 3 |
| South Angus | Malcolm Slesser | 15,179 | 36.6 | 2 |
| South Ayrshire | Roger Mullin | 6,612 | 16.4 | 3 |
| Stirling, Falkirk and Grangemouth | Robert McIntyre | 17,836 | 34.5 | 2 |
| West Aberdeenshire | M. Suttar | 6,827 | 15.4 | 3 |
| West Dunbartonshire | Stan Stratton | 11,144 | 27.2 | 3 |
| Western Isles | Donald Stewart | 10,079 | 67.1 | 1 |
| West Lothian | William Wolfe | 21,690 | 35.0 | 2 |
| West Renfrewshire | Charles Cameron | 8,394 | 15.2 | 3 |
| West Stirlingshire | Janette Jones | 12,886 | 29.7 | 2 |

=== October 1974 general election ===
| Constituency | Candidate | Votes | % | Position |
|---|---|---|---|---|
| Aberdeen North | James McGugan | 13,509 | 29.7 | 2 |
| Aberdeen South | Sandy Stronach | 10,481 | 20.1 | 3 |
| Argyll | Iain MacCormick | 14,967 | 49.7 | 1 |
| Ayr | E. Robinson | 6,902 | 16.7 | 3 |
| Banffshire | Hamish Watt | 10,638 | 45.9 | 1 |
| Berwick and East Lothian | R. Macleod | 6,323 | 13.2 | 3 |
| Bothwell | J. McCool | 11,138 | 24.5 | 2 |
| Bute and North Ayrshire | John Murphy | 9,055 | 25.9 | 3 |
| Caithness and Sutherland | Eric Sutherland | 5,381 | 23.9 | 2 |
| Central Ayrshire | Leslie Anderson | 11,533 | 24.5 | 3 |
| Central Dunbartonshire | C. Aitken | 11,452 | 29.1 | 2 |
| Central Fife | David Livingstone | 14,414 | 33.4 | 2 |
| Clackmannan and Eastern Stirlingshire | George Reid | 25,998 | 50.8 | 1 |
| Coatbridge and Airdrie | R. Hill | 12,466 | 27.9 | 2 |
| Dumfriesshire | L. A. B. Whitley | 12,542 | 26.4 | 3 |
| Dundee East | Gordon Wilson | 22,120 | 47.7 | 1 |
| Dundee West | Jim Fairlie | 16,678 | 35.1 | 2 |
| Dunfermline | A. C. Cameron | 13,179 | 28.6 | 2 |
| East Aberdeenshire | Douglas Henderson | 16,304 | 48.5 | 1 |
| East Dunbartonshire | Margaret Bain | 15,551 | 31.2 | 1 |
| East Fife | James Braid | 13,202 | 31.8 | 2 |
| East Kilbride | Gordon Murray | 19,106 | 36.7 | 2 |
| East Renfrewshire | I. Jenkins | 11,137 | 23.2 | 2 |
| Edinburgh Central | Steven Rae | 6,866 | 24.9 | 3 |
| Edinburgh East | G. MacDougall | 11,213 | 25.6 | 2 |
| Edinburgh Leith | R. Scott | 7,688 | 26.1 | 3 |
| Edinburgh North | J. Lynch | 7,681 | 23.5 | 3 |
| Edinburgh Pentlands | J. Hutchinson | 10,189 | 24.6 | 3 |
| Edinburgh South | R. Shirley | 9,034 | 21.7 | 3 |
| Edinburgh West | C. M. Moore | 8,135 | 20.2 | 3 |
| Galloway | George Thompson | 12,242 | 40.3 | 1 |
| Glasgow Cathcart | Alex Ewing | 6,292 | 16.5 | 3 |
| Glasgow Central | B. Nugent | 2,790 | 19.2 | 3 |
| Glasgow Craigton | R. G. Houston | 8,171 | 24.3 | 2 |
| Glasgow Garscadden | Keith Bovey | 12,111 | 31.2 | 2 |
| Glasgow Govan | Margo MacDonald | 9,440 | 41.0 | 2 |
| Glasgow Hillhead | G. Borthwick | 6,897 | 22.8 | 3 |
| Glasgow Kelvingrove | C. Calman | 6,274 | 23.2 | 3 |
| Glasgow Maryhill | A. MacIntosh | 10,171 | 29.9 | 2 |
| Glasgow Pollok | D. P. Macquarrie | 10,441 | 24.3 | 3 |
| Glasgow Provan | R. Edwards | 10,268 | 30.2 | 2 |
| Glasgow Queen's Park | David MacKellar | 5,660 | 21.8 | 2 |
| Glasgow Shettleston | R. Hamilton | 7,042 | 28,.6 | 2 |
| Glasgow Springburn | William J. Morton | 9,049 | 28.3 | 2 |
| Greenock and Port Glasgow | J. K. Wright | 9,324 | 21.1 | 2 |
| Hamilton | Ian Macdonald | 15,155 | 39.0 | 2 |
| Inverness | Donald Barr | 11,994 | 29.6 | 2 |
| Kilmarnock | Alistair MacInnes | 14,655 | 30.2 | 2 |
| Kinross and Western Perthshire | Derek Cameron | 10,981 | 41.5 | 2 |
| Kirkcaldy | Roger Knox | 14,587 | 32.0 | 2 |
| Lanark | Thomas McAlpine | 14,250 | 35.8 | 2 |
| Midlothian | John McKinlay | 24,568 | 35.6 | 2 |
| Moray and Nairn | Winnie Ewing | 12,667 | 41.2 | 1 |
| Motherwell and Wishaw | J. MacKay | 12,357 | 31.8 | 2 |
| North Angus and Mearns | I. Murray | 9,284 | 34.2 | 2 |
| North Lanarkshire | P. Watt | 11,561 | 26.9 | 2 |
| Orkney and Shetland | Howard Firth | 3,025 | 17.2 | 2 |
| Paisley | David Rollo | 15,778 | 33.1 | 2 |
| Perth and Kinross | Douglas Crawford | 17,337 | 40.8 | 1 |
| Ross and Cromarty | Willie McRae | 7,291 | 35.7 | 2 |
| Roxburgh, Selkirk and Peebles | A. Edmonds | 9,178 | 20.0 | 3 |
| Rutherglen | I. O. Bayne | 9,732 | 25.3 | 2 |
| South Angus | Andrew Welsh | 17,073 | 43.8 | 1 |
| South Ayrshire | Roger Mullin | 7,851 | 19.8 | 2 |
| Stirling, Falkirk and Grangemouth | Robert McIntyre | 20,324 | 39.8 | 2 |
| West Aberdeenshire | Nicol Suttar | 9,409 | 22.2 | 3 |
| West Dunbartonshire | A. Murray | 13,697 | 33.7 | 2 |
| Western Isles | Donald Stewart | 8,758 | 61.5 | 1 |
| West Lothian | William Wolfe | 24,997 | 40.9 | 2 |
| West Renfrewshire | Charles Cameron | 15,374 | 28.6 | 2 |
| West Stirlingshire | Janette Jones | 16,331 | 38.2 | 2 |

=== By-elections, 1974–79 ===
| By-election | Candidate | Votes | % | Position |
|---|---|---|---|---|
| 1978 Glasgow Garscadden by-election | Keith Bovey | 11,955 | 32.9 | 2 |
| 1978 Hamilton by-election | Margo MacDonald | 12,388 | 33.4 | 2 |
| 1978 Berwick and East Lothian by-election | Isobel Lindsay | 3,799 | 8.8 | 3 |

=== 1979 general election ===
| Constituency | Candidate | Votes | % | Position |
|---|---|---|---|---|
| Aberdeen North | M. Watt | 5,796 | 12.9 | 3 |
| Aberdeen South | A. Stronach | 4,361 | 8.5 | 4 |
| Argyll | Iain MacCormick | 10,545 | 31.8 | 2 |
| Ayr | J. McGill | 3,998 | 9.2 | 4 |
| Banffshire | Hamish Watt | 9,781 | 41.2 | 2 |
| Berwick and East Lothian | A. McCartney | 3,300 | 6.5 | 4 |
| Bothwell | J. F. McCool | 5,202 | 10.8 | 4 |
| Bute and North Ayrshire | M. Brown | 5,272 | 13.9 | 3 |
| Caithness and Sutherland | Robin Shaw | 6,487 | 28.0 | 3 |
| Central Ayrshire | Ian Macdonald | 5,596 | 10.4 | 3 |
| Central Dunbartonshire | W. Lindsay | 6,055 | 15.3 | 3 |
| Central Fife | J. Lynch | 9,208 | 19.4 | 3 |
| Clackmannan and Eastern Stirlingshire | George Reid | 21,796 | 40.1 | 2 |
| Coatbridge and Airdrie | M. Johnston | 3,652 | 10.5 | 3 |
| Dumfriesshire | E. Gibson | 6,647 | 13.2 | 4 |
| Dundee East | Gordon Wilson | 20,497 | 41.7 | 1 |
| Dundee West | Jim Fairlie | 13,197 | 26.4 | 2 |
| Dunfermline | A. C. Cameron | 7,351 | 14.3 | 3 |
| East Aberdeenshire | Douglas Henderson | 16,269 | 41.4 | 2 |
| East Dunbartonshire | Margaret Bain | 12,654 | 20.6 | 3 |
| East Fife | J. Marshall | 6,612 | 14.1 | 4 |
| East Kilbride | Gordon Murray | 9,090 | 15.6 | 3 |
| East Renfrewshire | J. Pow | 3,989 | 7.7 | 4 |
| Edinburgh Central | G. Kennedy | 2,486 | 9.8 | 4 |
| Edinburgh East | G. MacDougall | 5,296 | 12.1 | 3 |
| Edinburgh Leith | W. R. Platt | 2,706 | 9.7 | 4 |
| Edinburgh North | Neil MacCormick | 3,521 | 10.8 | 4 |
| Edinburgh Pentlands | Stephen Maxwell | 4,934 | 11.0 | 4 |
| Edinburgh South | R. Shirley | 3,800 | 8.4 | 4 |
| Edinburgh West | Colin Bell | 3,904 | 9.2 | 4 |
| Galloway | George Thompson | 12,384 | 37.1 | 2 |
| Glasgow Cathcart | Alex Ewing | 2,653 | 6.9 | 3 |
| Glasgow Central | S. Bird | 1,308 | 11.1 | 3 |
| Glasgow Craigton | R. Silver | 3,881 | 11.7 | 3 |
| Glasgow Garscadden | J. Bain | 6,012 | 15.7 | 3 |
| Glasgow Govan | T. Wilson | 2,340 | 13.6 | 3 |
| Glasgow Hillhead | G. Borthwick | 3,050 | 10.1 | 4 |
| Glasgow Kelvingrove | I. O. Bayne | 2,199 | 9.9 | 4 |
| Glasgow Maryhill | D. McGlashan | 3,812 | 11.2 | 3 |
| Glasgow Pollok | A. McIntosh | 4,187 | 9.6 | 3 |
| Glasgow Provan | R. Cunning | 4,767 | 13.8 | 3 |
| Glasgow Queen's Park | P. Greene | 2,276 | 9.7 | 3 |
| Glasgow Shettleston | Margo MacDonald | 3,022 | 13.9 | 3 |
| Glasgow Springburn | William J. Morton | 3,587 | 12.6 | 3 |
| Greenock and Port Glasgow | J. K. Wright | 3,435 | 7.6 | 4 |
| Hamilton | C. Stoddart | 6,842 | 16.6 | 3 |
| Inverness | Donald Barr | 9,603 | 20.6 | 3 |
| Kilmarnock | A. MacInnes | 8,963 | 18.3 | 3 |
| Kinross and Western Perthshire | Ian Smith | 9,045 | 29.4 | 2 |
| Kirkcaldy | A. Currie | 9,416 | 19.9 | 3 |
| Lanark | Thomas McAlpine | 7,902 | 18.8 | 3 |
| Midlothian | G. A. F. Spiers | 13,260 | 16.8 | 3 |
| Moray and Nairn | Winnie Ewing | 13,800 | 38.9 | 2 |
| Motherwell and Wishaw | J. MacKay | 4,817 | 12.3 | 3 |
| North Angus and Mearns | I. Murray | 7,387 | 23.2 | 2 |
| North Lanarkshire | J. Ralston | 5,887 | 13.1 | 3 |
| Orkney and Shetland | M. Spens | 935 | 4.8 | 4 |
| Paisley | David Rollo | 7,305 | 15.7 | 3 |
| Perth and Kinross | Douglas Crawford | 17,050 | 35.5 | 2 |
| Ross and Cromarty | Willie McRae | 5,915 | 23.6 | 2 |
| Roxburgh, Selkirk and Peebles | Angus Stewart | 3,502 | 7.2 | 4 |
| Rutherglen | Michael Grieve | 3,325 | 8.4 | 4 |
| South Angus | Andrew Welsh | 19,066 | 41.5 | 2 |
| South Ayrshire | C. Cameron | 3,233 | 8.0 | 4 |
| Stirling, Falkirk and Grangemouth | J. Donarchy | 8,856 | 17.0 | 2 |
| West Aberdeenshire | J. Hulbert | 4,260 | 8.3 | 4 |
| West Dunbartonshire | Stan Stratton | 7,835 | 17.9 | 3 |
| Western Isles | Donald Stewart | 7,941 | 52.5 | 1 |
| West Lothian | William Wolfe | 16,631 | 24.9 | 2 |
| West Renfrewshire | Charles Cameron | 8,333 | 13.1 | 3 |
| West Stirlingshire | Janette Jones | 8,627 | 18.3 | 3 |

=== By-elections, 1979–83 ===
| By-election | Candidate | Votes | % | Position |
|---|---|---|---|---|
| 1980 Glasgow Central by-election | Gil Paterson | 2,122 | 26.3 | 2 |
| 1982 Glasgow Hillhead by-election | George Leslie | 3,416 | 11.3 | 4 |
| 1982 Coatbridge and Airdrie by-election | Ron Wyllie | 3,652 | 10.5 | 3 |
| 1982 Glasgow Queen's Park by-election | Peter Mallan | 3,157 | 20.0 | 2 |

=== 1983 general election ===
| Constituency | Candidate | Votes | % | Position |
|---|---|---|---|---|
| Aberdeen North | James McGugan | 3,790 | 9.3 | 4 |
| Aberdeen South | Sam Coull | 1,974 | 5.0 | 4 |
| Argyll and Bute | Ian Smith | 8,514 | 24.6 | 3 |
| Ayr | I. Goldie | 2,431 | 4.9 | 4 |
| Banff and Buchan | Douglas Henderson | 15,135 | 37.4 | 2 |
| Caithness and Sutherland | Jim Ingram | 2,568 | 11.0 | 4 |
| Carrick, Cumnock and Doon Valley | Ron Wyllie | 2,694 | 6.5 | 4 |
| Central Fife | J. Taggart | 4,039 | 10.2 | 4 |
| Clackmannan | Janette Jones | 6,839 | 19.0 | 2 |
| Clydebank and Milngavie | A. Aitken | 3,566 | 9.2 | 4 |
| Clydesdale | Thomas McAlpine | 5,271 | 11.4 | 4 |
| Cumbernauld and Kilsyth | Gordon Murray | 5,875 | 17.4 | 3 |
| Cunninghame North | Colin Cameron | 3,460 | 8.6 | 4 |
| Cunninghame South | Kay Ullrich | 2,451 | 6.9 | 4 |
| Dumbarton | I. O. Bayne | 3,768 | 8.7 | 4 |
| Dumfriesshire | E. Gibson | 4,527 | 10.8 | 4 |
| Dundee East | Gordon Wilson | 20,276 | 43.8 | 1 |
| Dundee West | James Lynch | 7,973 | 17.1 | 4 |
| Dunfermline East | G. A. Hunter | 2,573 | 7.2 | 4 |
| Dunfermline West | Jim Fairlie | 2,798 | 7.8 | 4 |
| East Angus | Andrew Welsh | 15,691 | 36.0 | 2 |
| East Kilbride | D. M. Urquhart | 4,795 | 10.2 | 4 |
| East Lothian | Roger Knox | 2,083 | 4.4 | 4 |
| Eastwood | J. Herriot | 2,618 | 5.8 | 4 |
| Edinburgh Central | R. Halliday | 1,810 | 4.9 | 4 |
| Edinburgh East | P. Scott | 1,976 | 5.5 | 4 |
| Edinburgh Leith | J. Young | 2,646 | 6.5 | 4 |
| Edinburgh Pentlands | Donald Neil MacCormick | 2,642 | 6.1 | 4 |
| Edinburgh South | Neil MacCallum | 2,256 | 5.0 | 4 |
| Edinburgh West | J. Nicoll | 2,126 | 4.6 | 4 |
| Falkirk East | John McGregor | 4,490 | 11.9 | 4 |
| Falkirk West | Brian Cochrane | 4,739 | 13.0 | 4 |
| Galloway and Upper Nithsdale | George Thompson | 12,118 | 30.8 | 2 |
| Glasgow Cathcart | W. Steven | 2,151 | 5.6 | 4 |
| Glasgow Central | P. Mallam | 3,300 | 10.3 | 4 |
| Glasgow Garscadden | N. MacLeod | 3,566 | 10.2 | 4 |
| Glasgow Govan | P. Kindlen | 2,207 | 6.0 | 4 |
| Glasgow Hillhead | George Andrew Leslie | 2,203 | 5.4 | 4 |
| Glasgow Maryhill | I. Morrison | 2,408 | 7.1 | 4 |
| Glasgow Pollok | F. Hanningan | 3,585 | 9.9 | 4 |
| Glasgow Provan | P. Kennedy | 2,737 | 8.8 | 4 |
| Glasgow Rutherglen | K. Fee | 2,438 | 5.5 | 4 |
| Glasgow Shettleston | D. Hood | 2,801 | 7.9 | 4 |
| Glasgow Springburn | J. McLaughlin | 2,804 | 8.1 | 4 |
| Gordon | Kenneth James Nicolson Guild | 2,636 | 5.7 | 4 |
| Greenock and Port Glasgow | A. H. Clayton | 2,989 | 6.8 | 4 |
| Hamilton | Mairi Whitehead | 3,816 | 8.2 | 4 |
| Inverness, Nairn and Lochaber | Hamish William Vernal | 4,395 | 9.8 | 4 |
| Kilmarnock and Loudoun | C. D. Calman | 4,165 | 9.0 | 4 |
| Kincardine and Deeside | A. Tuttle | 3,297 | 7.7 | 4 |
| Kirkcaldy | D. D. Wood | 3,452 | 9.1 | 4 |
| Linlithgow | D. H. Ramsey | 8,026 | 18.4 | 3 |
| Livingston | Kenny MacAskill | 5,090 | 13.5 | 4 |
| Midlothian | M. J. Hird | 2,826 | 6.2 | 4 |
| Moray | Hamish Watt | 15,231 | 35.2 | 2 |
| Motherwell North | Richard Lyle | 5,333 | 12.6 | 4 |
| Motherwell South | James Wright | 3,743 | 9.8 | 4 |
| Monklands East | T. R. Johnston | 3,185 | 8.9 | 4 |
| Monklands West | G. A. Lyon | 2,473 | 6.5 | 4 |
| North East Fife | John Hulbert | 2,442 | 6.6 | 3 |
| North Tayside | Alasdair Morgan | 9,170 | 24.3 | 2 |
| Orkney and Shetland | Winifred Ewing | 3,147 | 15.4 | 3 |
| Paisley North | H. Morell | 2,783 | 8.0 | 4 |
| Paisley South | James Robert Mitchell | 4,918 | 13.1 | 4 |
| Perth and Kinross | Douglas Crawford | 11,155 | 25.1 | 2 |
| Renfrew West and Inverclyde | W. Taylor | 3,653 | 8.8 | 4 |
| Ross, Cromarty and Skye | Kay B. Matheson | 4,863 | 13.9 | 4 |
| Roxburgh and Berwickshire | Robert Shirley | 852 | 2.7 | 4 |
| Stirling | W. Houston | 3,488 | 8.2 | 4 |
| Strathkelvin and Bearsden | Margaret Bain | 4,408 | 9.2 | 4 |
| Tweeddale, Ettrick and Lauderdale | William John Allan Macartney | 1,455 | 5.0 | 4 |
| Western Isles | Donald James Stewart | 8,272 | 54.5 | 1 |

=== 1987 general election ===
| Constituency | Candidate | Votes | % | Position |
|---|---|---|---|---|
| Aberdeen North | Philip Bowers Greenhorn | 5,827 | 13.2 | 4 |
| Aberdeen South | Michael Fraser Weir | 2,776 | 6.6 | 4 |
| Argyll | Robert Richard Shaw | 6,297 | 17.1 | 3 |
| Ayr | Colin Traynor Weir | 3,548 | 6.7 | 4 |
| Banff and Buchan | Alex Salmond | 19,462 | 44.3 | 1 |
| Caithness and Sutherland | Archibal William Kerr MacGregor | 2,371 | 10.3 | 4 |
| Carrick, Cumnock and Doon Valley | Charles Duncan Calman | 4,094 | 9.6 | 4 |
| Central Fife | Daniel Hood | 6,296 | 14.7 | 4 |
| Clackmannan | Allan Macartney | 7,916 | 20.9 | 2 |
| Clydebank and Milngavie | Stanley Finlayson Fisher | 4,935 | 12.5 | 4 |
| Clydesdale | Michael Russell | 7,125 | 14.8 | 4 |
| Cumbernauld and Kilsyth | Thomas Ross Johnston | 6,982 | 19.6 | 2 |
| Cunninghame North | Matthew Brown | 4,076 | 9.5 | 4 |
| Cunninghame South | Kay Ullrich | 4,115 | 11.0 | 4 |
| Dumbarton | Jenny Herriot | 5,564 | 12.1 | 4 |
| Dumfriesshire | Thomas McAlpine | 6,391 | 14.2 | 4 |
| Dundee East | Gordon Wilson | 18,524 | 40.1 | 2 |
| Dundee West | Alasdair Neil Morgan | 7,164 | 15.3 | 3 |
| Dunfermline East | Alice McGarry | 3,901 | 10.0 | 4 |
| Dunfermline West | Gordon John Hughes | 3,435 | 8.7 | 4 |
| East Angus | Andrew Welsh | 19,536 | 42.4 | 1 |
| East Kilbride | James Hand Taggart | 6,275 | 12.6 | 4 |
| East Lothian | Alexander Burgon-Lyon | 3,727 | 7.3 | 4 |
| Eastwood | James Alexander May Findlay | 4,033 | 8.2 | 4 |
| Edinburgh Central | Brian Shaw | 2,559 | 6.2 | 4 |
| Edinburgh East | Mungo Bovey | 3,434 | 9.5 | 4 |
| Edinburgh Leith | William Scott Morrison | 4,045 | 9.5 | 4 |
| Edinburgh Pentlands | Donald Neil MacCormick | 3,264 | 7.2 | 4 |
| Edinburgh South | Catherina McMillan Moore | 2,455 | 5.0 | 4 |
| Edinburgh West | Norman Irons | 2,774 | 5.6 | 4 |
| Falkirk East | Ronald Neil Forbes Halliday | 6,056 | 15.4 | 3 |
| Falkirk West | Ian Roy Goldie | 6,696 | 17.4 | 3 |
| Galloway and Upper Nithsdale | Stephen Frederick Norris | 12,919 | 31.5 | 2 |
| Glasgow Cathcart | William Alexander Steven | 3,883 | 10.3 | 4 |
| Glasgow Central | Alexander Bloomfield Wilson | 3,339 | 10.0 | 4 |
| Glasgow Garscadden | Andrew Brophy | 4,201 | 12.3 | 2 |
| Glasgow Govan | Felix McCabe | 3,851 | 10.4 | 4 |
| Glasgow Hillhead | Bill Kidd | 2,713 | 6.5 | 4 |
| Glasgow Maryhill | Gavin Roberts | 3,895 | 11.0 | 3 |
| Glasgow Pollok | Andrew Doig | 3,528 | 9.6 | 4 |
| Glasgow Provan | William Ramsay | 3,660 | 12.1 | 2 |
| Glasgow Rutherglen | John Higgins | 3,584 | 8.1 | 4 |
| Glasgow Shettleston | John Armstrong MacVicar | 4,807 | 12.7 | 3 |
| Glasgow Springburn | Brendan O'Hara | 2,554 | 10.2 | 2 |
| Gordon | George Easton Wright | 3,876 | 7.2 | 4 |
| Greenock and Port Glasgow | Thomas Lenehan | 3,721 | 8.6 | 4 |
| Hamilton | Christopher Crossley | 6,093 | 12.7 | 4 |
| Inverness, Nairn and Lochaber | Niall Peter Johnson | 7,001 | 14.8 | 4 |
| Kilmarnock and Loudoun | George Leslie | 8,881 | 18.2 | 3 |
| Kincardine and Deeside | Frances Elsbeth Duncan | 3,082 | 6.5 | 4 |
| Kirkcaldy | William Arthur Roger Mullin | 4,794 | 11.7 | 4 |
| Linlithgow | Jim Sillars | 11,496 | 24.9 | 2 |
| Livingston | Kenny MacAskill | 6,969 | 16.6 | 3 |
| Midlothian | Ian MacKay Chisholm | 4,947 | 10.6 | 4 |
| Moray | Margaret Ewing | 19,510 | 43.2 | 1 |
| Motherwell North | Andrew Currie | 6,230 | 14.0 | 2 |
| Motherwell South | James Wright | 6,027 | 15.3 | 2 |
| Monklands East | Kenneth James Gibson | 4,790 | 12.9 | 4 |
| Monklands West | Keith Bovey | 4,260 | 10.8 | 4 |
| North East Fife | Francis David Roche | 2,616 | 6.6 | 4 |
| North Tayside | Kenneth James Nicolson Guild | 13,291 | 32.9 | 2 |
| Paisley North | Ian Taylor | 4,696 | 12.9 | 4 |
| Paisley South | James Robert Mitchell | 5,398 | 14.0 | 4 |
| Perth and Kinross | James McGregor Fairlie | 13,040 | 27.6 | 2 |
| Renfrew West and Inverclyde | Colin McIver Campbell | 4,578 | 10.1 | 4 |
| Ross, Cromarty and Skye | Robert McKay Gibson | 4,492 | 11.8 | 4 |
| Roxburgh and Berwickshire | Marshall Neil Douglas | 1,586 | 4.8 | 4 |
| Stirling | Iain Macdonald Lawson | 4,897 | 10.7 | 4 |
| Strathkelvin and Bearsden | Gil Paterson | 3,654 | 7.1 | 4 |
| Tweeddale, Ettrick and Lauderdale | Andrew Lumsden | 2,660 | 9.1 | 4 |
| Western Isles | Ian Smith | 4,701 | 28.5 | 2 |

=== By-elections, 1987–92 ===
| By-election | Candidate | Votes | % | Position |
|---|---|---|---|---|
| 1988 Glasgow Govan by-election | Jim Sillars | 14,677 | 48.8 | 1 |
| 1989 Glasgow Central by-election | Alex Neil | 8,018 | 30.2 | 2 |
| 1990 Paisley North by-election | Roger Mullin | 7,583 | 29.4 | 2 |
| 1990 Paisley South by-election | Iain Lawson | 7,455 | 27.5 | 2 |
| 1991 Kincardine and Deeside by-election | Allan Macartney | 4,705 | 11.1 | 3 |

=== 1992 general election ===
| Constituency | Candidate | Votes | % | Position |
|---|---|---|---|---|
| Aberdeen North | James McGugan | 9,608 | 24.0 | 2 |
| Aberdeen South | James Davidson | 6,223 | 15.1 | 3 |
| Argyll | Neil MacCormick | 8,689 | 23.8 | 3 |
| Ayr | Barbara Mullin | 5,949 | 10.9 | 3 |
| Banff and Buchan | Alex Salmond | 21,954 | 47.5 | 1 |
| Caithness and Sutherland | Archibal William Kerr MacGregor | 4,049 | 18.2 | 3 |
| Carrick, Cumnock and Doon Valley | Charles Douglas | 6,910 | 16.2 | 3 |
| Central Fife | Tricia Marwick | 10,458 | 25.1 | 2 |
| Clackmannan | Andrew Brophy | 10,326 | 26.9 | 2 |
| Clydebank and Milngavie | Gordon Hughes | 7,207 | 19.6 | 2 |
| Clydesdale | Iain Gray | 11,084 | 23.1 | 3 |
| Cumbernauld and Kilsyth | Thomas Johnston | 10,640 | 28.9 | 2 |
| Cunninghame North | David Crossan | 7,813 | 18.2 | 3 |
| Cunninghame South | Ricky Bell | 9,007 | 24.2 | 2 |
| Dumbarton | Bill McKechnie | 8,127 | 18.4 | 3 |
| Dumfriesshire | Alasdair Morgan | 6,971 | 14.3 | 3 |
| Dundee East | David Coutts | 14,197 | 33.4 | 2 |
| Dundee West | Keith Brown | 9,894 | 23.6 | 2 |
| Dunfermline East | John Lloyd | 5,746 | 15.1 | 3 |
| Dunfermline West | Jay Smith | 7,563 | 19.4 | 3 |
| East Angus | Andrew Welsh | 19,006 | 40.1 | 1 |
| East Kilbride | Kathleen McAlorum | 12,063 | 23.5 | 2 |
| East Lothian | George R. Thomson | 7,776 | 14.2 | 3 |
| Eastwood | Paul H. Scott | 6,372 | 12.4 | 4 |
| Edinburgh Central | Lynne Devine | 5,539 | 14.2 | 3 |
| Edinburgh East | Debin McKinney | 6,225 | 18.4 | 3 |
| Edinburgh Leith | Fiona Hyslop | 8,805 | 21.8 | 2 |
| Edinburgh Pentlands | Kathleen Caskie | 6,882 | 15.4 | 3 |
| Edinburgh South | Roger Knox | 5,727 | 12.8 | 4 |
| Edinburgh West | Graham Sutherland | 4,117 | 8.4 | 4 |
| Falkirk East | Ronald Halliday | 10,454 | 26.2 | 2 |
| Falkirk West | William Houston | 9,350 | 24.3 | 2 |
| Galloway and Upper Nithsdale | Matt Brown | 16,213 | 36.5 | 2 |
| Glasgow Cathcart | William Steven | 6,107 | 18.1 | 3 |
| Glasgow Central | Brendan O'Hara | 6,322 | 20.8 | 2 |
| Glasgow Garscadden | Dick Douglas | 5,580 | 19.0 | 2 |
| Glasgow Govan | Jim Sillars | 12,926 | 37.1 | 2 |
| Glasgow Hillhead | Sandra White | 6,484 | 16.5 | 4 |
| Glasgow Maryhill | Clifford Williamson | 6,033 | 19.1 | 2 |
| Glasgow Pollok | George Leslie | 5,107 | 15.7 | 4 |
| Glasgow Provan | Alexandra McRae | 5,182 | 21.7 | 2 |
| Glasgow Rutherglen | John Higgins | 6,470 | 16.3 | 3 |
| Glasgow Shettleston | Nicola Sturgeon | 6,831 | 19.1 | 2 |
| Glasgow Springburn | Stuart Miller | 5,863 | 19.5 | 2 |
| Gordon | Brian Adam | 8,445 | 14.3 | 3 |
| Greenock and Port Glasgow | Ian Black | 7,279 | 19.0 | 2 |
| Hamilton | Bill Morrison | 9,246 | 19.7 | 2 |
| Inverness, Nairn and Lochaber | Fergus Ewing | 12,562 | 24.7 | 3 |
| Kilmarnock and Loudoun | Alex Neil | 15,231 | 30.7 | 2 |
| Kincardine and Deeside | Allan Macartney | 5,927 | 11.3 | 3 |
| Kirkcaldy | Stewart Hosie | 8,761 | 22.5 | 2 |
| Linlithgow | Kenny MacAskill | 14,577 | 30.3 | 2 |
| Livingston | Peter Johnston | 12,140 | 26.6 | 2 |
| Midlothian | Andrew Lumsden | 10,254 | 21.9 | 2 |
| Moray | Margaret Ewing | 20,299 | 44.3 | 1 |
| Motherwell North | David A. Clark | 8,942 | 20.3 | 2 |
| Motherwell South | Kay Ullrich | 7,758 | 20.3 | 2 |
| Monklands East | Jim Wright | 6,554 | 18.0 | 2 |
| Monklands West | Keith Bovey | 6,319 | 16.6 | 2 |
| North East Fife | David Roche | 3,589 | 8.6 | 3 |
| North Tayside | John Swinney | 16,288 | 37.5 | 2 |
| Orkney and Shetland | Frances McKie | 2,301 | 11.2 | 4 |
| Paisley North | Roger Mullin | 7,940 | 23.3 | 2 |
| Paisley South | Iain Lawson | 7,455 | 27.5 | 2 |
| Perth and Kinross | Roseanna Cunningham | 18,101 | 36.0 | 2 |
| Renfrew West and Inverclyde | Colin McIver Campbell | 9,444 | 12.5 | 3 |
| Ross, Cromarty and Skye | Rob Gibson | 7,618 | 18.5 | 3 |
| Roxburgh and Berwickshire | Marshall Douglas | 3,437 | 10.2 | 3 |
| Stirling | Gerard Fisher | 6,558 | 13.7 | 3 |
| Strathkelvin and Bearsden | Tom Chalmers | 6,275 | 12.5 | 3 |
| Tweeddale, Ettrick and Lauderdale | Christine Creech | 5,244 | 17.0 | 3 |
| Western Isles | Frances MacFarlane | 5,961 | 37.2 | 2 |

=== By-elections, 1992–97 ===
| By-election | Candidate | Votes | % | Position |
|---|---|---|---|---|
| 1994 Monklands East by-election | Kay Ullrich | 15,320 | 44.9 | 2 |
| 1995 Perth and Kinross by-election | Roseanna Cunningham | 16,931 | 40.4 | 1 |

=== 1997 general election ===
| Constituency | Candidate | Votes | % | Position |
|---|---|---|---|---|
| Aberdeen Central | Brian Topping | 5,767 | 16.2 | 3 |
| Aberdeen North | Brian Adam | 8,379 | 21.8 | 2 |
| Aberdeen South | Jim Towers | 4,299 | 11.6 | 4 |
| Airdrie and Shotts | Keith Robertson | 10,048 | 24.4 | 2 |
| Angus | Andrew Welsh | 20,792 | 48.3 | 1 |
| Argyll and Bute | Neil MacCormick | 8,278 | 23.2 | 2 |
| Ayr | Ian Blackford | 5,625 | 12.6 | 3 |
| Banff and Buchan | Alex Salmond | 22,409 | 55.8 | 1 |
| Caithness, Sutherland and Easter Ross | Euan Harper | 6,710 | 23.0 | 3 |
| Carrick, Cumnock and Doon Valley | Christine Hutchison | 8,190 | 16.7 | 3 |
| Central Fife | Tricia Marwick | 10,199 | 25.0 | 2 |
| Clydebank and Milngavie | Jim Yuill | 8,263 | 21.1 | 2 |
| Clydesdale | Andrew Doig | 10,050 | 22.1 | 2 |
| Coatbridge and Chryston | Brian Nugent | 6,402 | 17.0 | 2 |
| Cumbernauld and Kilsyth | Colin Barrie | 10,013 | 27.8 | 2 |
| Cunninghame North | Kim Nicoll | 7,584 | 18.4 | 3 |
| Cunninghame South | Margaret Burgess | 7,364 | 20.8 | 2 |
| Dumbarton | Bill McKechnie | 9,587 | 23.2 | 2 |
| Dumfriesshire | Robert Higgins | 5,977 | 12.1 | 3 |
| Dundee East | Shona Robison | 10,757 | 26.5 | 2 |
| Dundee West | John Dorward | 9,016 | 23.2 | 2 |
| Dunfermline East | John Ramage | 5,690 | 15.6 | 2 |
| Dunfermline West | John Lloyd | 6,984 | 19.2 | 2 |
| East Kilbride | George Gebbie | 10,200 | 20.9 | 2 |
| East Lothian | David McCarthy | 6,825 | 15.7 | 3 |
| Eastwood | Douglas Yates | 6,826 | 13.1 | 3 |
| Edinburgh Central | Fiona Hyslop | 6,750 | 15.8 | 3 |
| Edinburgh East and Musselburgh | Derrick White | 8,034 | 19.1 | 2 |
| Edinburgh North and Leith | Anne Dana | 8,231 | 20.1 | 2 |
| Edinburgh Pentlands | Stewart Gibb | 6,882 | 13.0 | 3 |
| Edinburgh South | John Hargreaves | 5,791 | 12.9 | 4 |
| Edinburgh West | Graham Sutherland | 4,210 | 8.8 | 4 |
| Falkirk East | Keith Brown | 9,959 | 23.9 | 2 |
| Falkirk West | David Alexander | 8,989 | 23.4 | 2 |
| Galloway and Upper Nithsdale | Alasdair Morgan | 18,449 | 43.9 | 1 |
| Glasgow Anniesland | Bill Wilson | 5,797 | 17.1 | 2 |
| Glasgow Baillieston | Patsy Thomson | 6,085 | 19.1 | 2 |
| Glasgow Cathcart | Maire Whitehead | 6,913 | 18.5 | 2 |
| Glasgow Govan | Nicola Sturgeon | 11,302 | 35.1 | 2 |
| Glasgow Kelvin | Sandra White | 6,978 | 21.4 | 2 |
| Glasgow Maryhill | John Wailes | 5,037 | 16.9 | 2 |
| Glasgow Pollok | David Logan | 5,862 | 17.9 | 2 |
| Glasgow Shettleston | Humayun Hanif | 3,748 | 14.0 | 2 |
| Glasgow Springburn | John Brady | 5,208 | 16.5 | 2 |
| Gordon | Rhona Kemp | 5,760 | 15.6 | 3 |
| Greenock and Inverclyde | Richard Lochhead | 8,435 | 20.0 | 3 |
| Hamilton North and Bellshill | Michael Matheson | 7,255 | 19.1 | 2 |
| Hamilton South | Ian Black | 5,831 | 17.6 | 2 |
| Inverness East, Nairn and Lochaber | Fergus Ewing | 13,848 | 29.0 | 2 |
| Kilmarnock and Loudoun | Alex Neil | 16,365 | 34.5 | 2 |
| Kirkcaldy | Stewart Hosie | 8,020 | 22.9 | 2 |
| Linlithgow | Kenny MacAskill | 10,631 | 26.8 | 2 |
| Livingston | Peter Johnston | 11,763 | 27.5 | 2 |
| Midlothian | Lawrence Millar | 8,991 | 25.5 | 2 |
| Moray | Margaret Ewing | 16,529 | 41.6 | 1 |
| Motherwell and Wishaw | James McGuigan | 8,229 | 22.5 | 2 |
| North East Fife | Colin Welsh | 4,545 | 10.8 | 3 |
| North Tayside | John Swinney | 20,447 | 44.8 | 1 |
| Ochil | George Reid | 15,055 | 34.4 | 2 |
| Orkney and Shetland | Willie Ross | 2,624 | 12.7 | 3 |
| Paisley North | Ian Mackay | 7,481 | 21.9 | 2 |
| Paisley South | William Martin | 8,732 | 23.4 | 2 |
| Perth | Roseanna Cunningham | 16,209 | 36.4 | 1 |
| Ross, Skye and Inverness West | Margaret Paterson | 7,821 | 19.6 | 3 |
| Roxburgh and Berwickshire | Malcolm Balfour | 3,959 | 11.3 | 4 |
| Rutherglen | Ian Gray | 5,423 | 15.3 | 2 |
| Stirling | Ewan Dow | 5,752 | 13.4 | 3 |
| Strathkelvin and Bearsden | Graeme McCormick | 8,111 | 16.3 | 3 |
| Tweeddale, Ettrick and Lauderdale | Ian Goldie | 6,671 | 17.1 | 4 |
| West Aberdeenshire and Kincardine | Joy Mowatt | 5,649 | 13.1 | 3 |
| West Renfrewshire | Colin Campbell | 10,546 | 26.5 | 2 |
| Western Isles | Anne Lorne Gillies | 5,379 | 33.4 | 2 |

=== By-elections, 1997–2001 ===
| By-election | Candidate | Votes | % | Position |
|---|---|---|---|---|
| 1997 Paisley South by-election | Ian Blackford | 7,615 | 32.5 | 2 |
| 1999 Hamilton South by-election | Annabelle Ewing | 6,616 | 34.0 | 2 |
| 2000 Glasgow Anniesland by-election | Grant Thoms | 4,202 | 21.0 | 2 |
| 2000 Falkirk West by-election | David Kerr | 7,787 | 39.9 | 2 |

=== 2001 general election ===
| Constituency | Candidate | Votes | % | Position |
|---|---|---|---|---|
| Aberdeen Central | Wayne Gault | 5,379 | 20.4 | 2 |
| Aberdeen North | Alasdair Allan | 8,708 | 28.7 | 2 |
| Aberdeen South | Ian Angus | 4,293 | 11.6 | 4 |
| Airdrie and Shotts | Alison Lindsay | 6,138 | 19.3 | 2 |
| Angus | Mike Weir | 12,347 | 35.3 | 1 |
| Argyll and Bute | Agnes Samuel | 6,433 | 20.8 | 4 |
| Ayr | Jim Mather | 4,621 | 12.0 | 3 |
| Banff and Buchan | Alex Salmond | 16,710 | 54.2 | 1 |
| Caithness, Sutherland and Easter Ross | John MacAdam | 5,273 | 21.2 | 3 |
| Carrick, Cumnock and Doon Valley | Tom Wilson | 6,258 | 15.6 | 3 |
| Central Fife | David Alexander | 8,235 | 25.3 | 2 |
| Clydebank and Milngavie | Jim Yuill | 6,525 | 20.1 | 2 |
| Clydesdale | Jim Wright | 10,028 | 26.2 | 2 |
| Coatbridge and Chryston | Peter Kearney | 4,493 | 14.8 | 2 |
| Cumbernauld and Kilsyth | David McGlashan | 8,624 | 29.0 | 2 |
| Cunninghame North | Campbell Martin | 7,173 | 21.2 | 2 |
| Cunninghame South | Bill Kidd | 5,194 | 18.5 | 2 |
| Dumbarton | Iain Robertson | 6,576 | 19.3 | 2 |
| Dumfriesshire | Gerard Fisher | 4,103 | 9.6 | 4 |
| Dundee East | Stewart Hosie | 10,169 | 31.4 | 2 |
| Dundee West | Gordon Archer | 7,987 | 27.3 | 2 |
| Dunfermline East | Johnny Mellon | 4,424 | 14.7 | 2 |
| Dunfermline West | Brian Goodall | 5,390 | 17.4 | 2 |
| East Kilbride | Archie Buchanan | 9,450 | 22.7 | 2 |
| East Lothian | Hilary Brown | 5,381 | 14.6 | 4 |
| Eastwood | Stewart Maxwell | 4,137 | 8.6 | 4 |
| Edinburgh Central | Ian McKee | 4,832 | 14.1 | 4 |
| Edinburgh East and Musselburgh | Rob Munn | 5,956 | 17.3 | 2 |
| Edinburgh North and Leith | Kaukab Stewart | 5,290 | 15.9 | 3 |
| Edinburgh Pentlands | Stewart Gibb | 4,210 | 10.8 | 4 |
| Edinburgh South | Heather Williams | 3,683 | 9.9 | 4 |
| Edinburgh West | Alyn Smith | 4,047 | 10.3 | 4 |
| Falkirk East | Isobel Hutton | 7,824 | 23.2 | 2 |
| Falkirk West | David Kerr | 7,490 | 24.2 | 2 |
| Galloway and Upper Nithsdale | Malcolm Fleming | 12,148 | 33.8 | 2 |
| Glasgow Anniesland | Grant Thoms | 4,048 | 15.1 | 2 |
| Glasgow Baillieston | Lachlan McNeill | 4,361 | 18.7 | 2 |
| Glasgow Cathcart | Josephine Docherty | 4,086 | 14.9 | 2 |
| Glasgow Govan | Karen Neary | 6,064 | 24.0 | 2 |
| Glasgow Kelvin | Frances Rankin | 4,513 | 16.8 | 3 |
| Glasgow Maryhill | Alex Dingwall | 3,532 | 15.9 | 2 |
| Glasgow Pollok | David Ritchie | 4,229 | 16.7 | 2 |
| Glasgow Shettleston | Jim Byrne | 3,417 | 16.7 | 2 |
| Glasgow Springburn | Sandy Bain | 4,675 | 19.4 | 2 |
| Gordon | Rhona Kemp | 5,760 | 15.6 | 3 |
| Greenock and Inverclyde | Andrew Murie | 4,248 | 14.9 | 3 |
| Hamilton North and Bellshill | Chris Stephens | 5,225 | 17.2 | 2 |
| Hamilton South | John Wilson | 5,190 | 19.4 | 2 |
| Inverness East, Nairn and Lochaber | Angus MacNeil | 10,889 | 25.6 | 2 |
| Kilmarnock and Loudoun | John Brady | 9,592 | 25.5 | 2 |
| Kirkcaldy | Shirley-Anne Somerville | 6,264 | 22.2 | 2 |
| Linlithgow | James Sibbald | 8,078 | 25.5 | 2 |
| Livingston | Graham Sutherland | 8,492 | 23.6 | 2 |
| Midlothian | Ian Goldie | 6,131 | 21.3 | 2 |
| Moray | Angus Robertson | 10,076 | 30.3 | 1 |
| Motherwell and Wishaw | James McGuigan | 5,725 | 19.3 | 2 |
| North East Fife | Kris Murray-Browne | 3,596 | 10.4 | 4 |
| North Tayside | Pete Wishart | 15,441 | 40.1 | 1 |
| Ochil | Keith Brown | 10,655 | 30.2 | 2 |
| Orkney and Shetland | John Mowat | 2,473 | 14.8 | 4 |
| Paisley North | George Adam | 5,737 | 21.1 | 2 |
| Paisley South | Brian Lawson | 5,920 | 19.4 | 2 |
| Perth | Annabelle Ewing | 11,237 | 29.7 | 1 |
| Ross, Skye and Inverness West | Jean Urquhart | 4,901 | 14.1 | 3 |
| Roxburgh and Berwickshire | Roderick Campbell | 2,806 | 9.7 | 4 |
| Rutherglen | Anne McLaughlin | 4,135 | 14.2 | 2 |
| Stirling | Fiona Macaulay | 5,877 | 16.4 | 3 |
| Strathkelvin and Bearsden | Calum Smith | 6,675 | 16.1 | 3 |
| Tweeddale, Ettrick and Lauderdale | Richard Thomson | 4,108 | 12.4 | 4 |
| West Aberdeenshire and Kincardine | John Green | 4,634 | 12.2 | 4 |
| West Renfrewshire | Carol Puthucheary | 7,145 | 21.3 | 2 |
| Western Isles | Alasdair Nicholson | 4,850 | 36.9 | 2 |

=== 2005 general election ===
| Constituency | Candidate | Votes | % | Position |
|---|---|---|---|---|
| Aberdeen North | Kevin Stewart | 8,168 | 22.3 | 3 |
| Aberdeen South | Maureen Watt | 4,120 | 9.9 | 4 |
| Airdrie and Shotts | Malcolm Balfour | 5,484 | 16.5 | 2 |
| Angus | Mike Weir | 12,840 | 33.7 | 1 |
| Argyll and Bute | Isobel Strong | 6,716 | 15.5 | 4 |
| Ayr, Carrick and Cumnock | Chic Brodie | 5,932 | 13.2 | 4 |
| Banff and Buchan | Alex Salmond | 19,044 | 51.2 | 1 |
| Berwickshire, Roxburgh and Selkirk | Aileen Orr | 3,885 | 8.6 | 4 |
| Caithness, Sutherland and Easter Ross | Karen Shirron | 3,686 | 13.3 | 3 |
| Central Ayrshire | Jahangir Shanif | 4,969 | 11.6 | 4 |
| Coatbridge, Chryston and Bellshill | Duncan Ross | 5,206 | 13.6 | 2 |
| Cumbernauld, Kilsyth and Kirkintilloch East | Jamie Hepburn | 8,689 | 22.2 | 2 |
| Dumfries and Galloway | Douglas Henderson | 6,182 | 12.1 | 3 |
| Dumfriesshire, Clydesdale and Tweeddale | Andrew Wood | 4,075 | 9.1 | 4 |
| Dundee East | Stewart Hosie | 14,708 | 37.2 | 1 |
| Dundee West | Joe Fitzpatrick | 11,089 | 30.0 | 2 |
| Dunfermline and West Fife | Douglas Chapman | 8,026 | 18.9 | 3 |
| East Dunbartonshire | Chris Sagan | 2,716 | 5.8 | 4 |
| East Kilbride, Strathaven and Lesmahagow | Douglas Edwards | 8,541 | 17.9 | 2 |
| East Lothian | Paul McLennan | 5,995 | 13.1 | 4 |
| East Renfrewshire | Osama Bhutta | 3,245 | 6.8 | 4 |
| Edinburgh East | Stefan Tymkewycz | 6,760 | 17.0 | 3 |
| Edinburgh North and Leith | Davie Hutchison | 4,344 | 10.2 | 4 |
| Edinburgh South | Graham Sutherland | 2,635 | 6.2 | 4 |
| Edinburgh South West | Nick Elliott-Cannon | 4,654 | 10.6 | 4 |
| Edinburgh West | Sheena Cleland | 4,124 | 9.1 | 4 |
| Falkirk | Laura Love | 9,789 | 21.4 | 2 |
| Glasgow Central | Bill Kidd | 4,148 | 14.8 | 3 |
| Glasgow East | Lachlan McNeill | 5,268 | 17.0 | 2 |
| Glasgow North | Kenneth McLean | 3,614 | 12.9 | 3 |
| Glasgow North East | John McLaughlin | 5,019 | 17.7 | 2 |
| Glasgow North West | Graeme Hendry | 4,676 | 13.7 | 3 |
| Glasgow South | Finlay MacLean | 4,860 | 12.6 | 3 |
| Glasgow South West | James Dornan | 4,757 | 15.4 | 2 |
| Glenrothes | John Beare | 8,731 | 23.4 | 2 |
| Gordon | Joanna Strathdee | 7,098 | 16.0 | 4 |
| Inverclyde | Stuart McMillan | 7,059 | 19.6 | 2 |
| Inverness, Nairn, Badenoch and Strathspey | Dave Thompson | 5,992 | 13.5 | 3 |
| Kilmarnock and Loudoun | Daniel Coffey | 12,273 | 27.7 | 2 |
| Kirkcaldy and Cowdenbeath | Alan Bath | 6,062 | 14.5 | 2 |
| Lanark and Hamilton East | John Wilson | 7,746 | 17.8 | 3 |
| Linlithgow and East Falkirk | Gordon Guthrie | 10,919 | 23.5 | 2 |
| Livingston | Angela Constance | 9,560 | 21.6 | 2 |
| Midlothian | Colin Beattie | 6,400 | 17.0 | 3 |
| Moray | Angus Robertson | 14,196 | 36.6 | 1 |
| Motherwell and Wishaw | Ian MacQuarrie | 6,105 | 16.5 | 2 |
| Na h-Eileanan an Iar | Angus MacNeil | 6,213 | 44.9 | 1 |
| North Ayrshire and Arran | Tony Gurney | 7,938 | 18.4 | 2 |
| North East Fife | Roderick Campbell | 4,011 | 10.4 | 4 |
| Ochil and South Perthshire | Annabelle Ewing | 13,957 | 29.9 | 2 |
| Orkney and Shetland | John Mowat | 1,833 | 10.3 | 4 |
| Paisley and Renfrew North | Bill Wilson | 7,696 | 18.8 | 2 |
| Paisley and Renfrewshire South | Andrew Doig | 6,653 | 17.6 | 3 |
| Perth and North Perthshire | Pete Wishart | 15,469 | 33.7 | 1 |
| Ross, Skye and Lochaber | Mhairi Will | 3,119 | 9.6 | 4 |
| Rutherglen and Hamilton West | Margaret Park | 6,023 | 13.9 | 3 |
| Stirling | Frances McGlinchey | 5,503 | 12.6 | 4 |
| West Aberdeenshire and Kincardine | Caroline Little | 4,700 | 11.3 | 4 |
| West Dunbartonshire | Tom Chalmers | 9,047 | 21.8 | 2 |

=== By-elections, 2005–10 ===
| By-election | Candidate | Votes | % | Position |
|---|---|---|---|---|
| 2005 Livingston by-election | Angela Constance | 9,639 | 32.7 | 2 |
| 2006 Dunfermline and West Fife by-election | Douglas Chapman | 7,261 | 21.0 | 3 |
| 2008 Glasgow East by-election | John Mason | 11,277 | 43.1 | 1 |
| 2008 Glenrothes by-election | Peter Grant | 13,209 | 36.5 | 2 |
| 2009 Glasgow North East by-election | David Kerr | 4,120 | 20.0 | 2 |

=== 2010 general election ===
| Constituency | Candidate | Votes | % | Position |
|---|---|---|---|---|
| Aberdeen North | Joanna Strathdee | 8,385 | 22.2 | 2 |
| Aberdeen South | Mark McDonald | 5,102 | 11.9 | 4 |
| Airdrie and Shotts | Sophia Coyle | 8,441 | 23.5 | 2 |
| Angus | Mike Weir | 15,020 | 39.6 | 1 |
| Argyll and Bute | Mike MacKenzie | 8,563 | 18.9 | 4 |
| Ayr, Carrick and Cumnock | Chic Brodie | 8,276 | 18.0 | 3 |
| Banff and Buchan | Eilidh Whiteford | 15,868 | 41.3 | 1 |
| Berwickshire, Roxburgh and Selkirk | Paul Wheelhouse | 4,497 | 9.2 | 4 |
| Caithness, Sutherland and Easter Ross | Jean Urquhart | 5,516 | 19.2 | 3 |
| Central Ayrshire | John Mullen | 8,364 | 19.0 | 3 |
| Coatbridge, Chryston and Bellshill | Frances McGlinchey | 7,014 | 16.9 | 2 |
| Cumbernauld, Kilsyth and Kirkintilloch East | Julie Hepburn | 9,794 | 23.8 | 2 |
| Dumfries and Galloway | Andrew Wood | 6,419 | 12.3 | 3 |
| Dumfriesshire, Clydesdale and Tweeddale | Aileen Orr | 4,945 | 10.8 | 4 |
| Dundee East | Stewart Hosie | 15,350 | 37.8 | 1 |
| Dundee West | Jim Barrie | 10,716 | 28.9 | 2 |
| Dunfermline and West Fife | Joe McCall | 5,201 | 10.6 | 3 |
| East Dunbartonshire | Iain White | 5,054 | 10.5 | 4 |
| East Kilbride, Strathaven and Lesmahagow | John McKenna | 11,738 | 23.0 | 2 |
| East Lothian | Andrew Sharp | 7,883 | 16.0 | 4 |
| East Renfrewshire | Gordon Archer | 4,535 | 8.9 | 4 |
| Edinburgh East | George Kerevan | 8,133 | 20.4 | 2 |
| Edinburgh North and Leith | Calum Cashley | 4,568 | 9.6 | 4 |
| Edinburgh South | Sandy Howat | 3,354 | 7.7 | 4 |
| Edinburgh South West | Kaukab Stewart | 5,530 | 12.2 | 4 |
| Edinburgh West | Sheena Cleland | 6,115 | 13.2 | 4 |
| Falkirk | John McNally | 15,364 | 30.3 | 2 |
| Glasgow Central | Osama Saeed | 5,357 | 17.5 | 2 |
| Glasgow East | John Mason | 7,957 | 24.7 | 2 |
| Glasgow North | Patrick Grady | 3,530 | 11.9 | 3 |
| Glasgow North East | Billy McAllister | 4,158 | 14.1 | 2 |
| Glasgow North West | Margaret Park | 5,430 | 15.3 | 3 |
| Glasgow South | Malcolm Fleming | 8,078 | 20.1 | 2 |
| Glasgow South West | Chris Stephens | 5,192 | 16.3 | 2 |
| Glenrothes | David Alexander | 8,799 | 21.7 | 2 |
| Gordon | Richard Thomson | 10,827 | 22.2 | 2 |
| Inverclyde | Innes Nelson | 6,577 | 17.5 | 2 |
| Inverness, Nairn, Badenoch and Strathspey | John Finnie | 8,803 | 18.7 | 3 |
| Kilmarnock and Loudoun | George Leslie | 12,082 | 26.0 | 2 |
| Kirkcaldy and Cowdenbeath | Douglas Chapman | 6,550 | 14.3 | 2 |
| Lanark and Hamilton East | Clare Adamson | 9,780 | 21.0 | 2 |
| Linlithgow and East Falkirk | Tam Smith | 13,081 | 25.4 | 2 |
| Livingston | Lis Bardell | 12,424 | 25.9 | 2 |
| Midlothian | Colin Beattie | 8,100 | 20.6 | 2 |
| Moray | Angus Robertson | 16,273 | 39.7 | 1 |
| Motherwell and Wishaw | Marion Fellows | 7,104 | 18.2 | 2 |
| Na h-Eileanan an Iar | Angus MacNeil | 6,723 | 45.7 | 1 |
| North Ayrshire and Arran | Patricia Gibson | 11,965 | 25.9 | 2 |
| North East Fife | Roderick Campbell | 5,685 | 14.2 | 4 |
| Ochil and South Perthshire | Annabelle Ewing | 13,944 | 27.6 | 2 |
| Orkney and Shetland | John Mowat | 2,042 | 10.6 | 3 |
| Paisley and Renfrew North | Mags MacLaren | 8,333 | 19.1 | 2 |
| Paisley and Renfrewshire South | Andrew Doig | 7,228 | 18.1 | 2 |
| Perth and North Perthshire | Pete Wishart | 19,118 | 39.6 | 1 |
| Ross, Skye and Lochaber | Alasdair Stephen | 5,263 | 15.1 | 3 |
| Rutherglen and Hamilton West | Graeme Horne | 7,564 | 16.1 | 2 |
| Stirling | Alison Lindsay | 8,091 | 17.3 | 3 |
| West Aberdeenshire and Kincardine | Dennis Robertson | 7,086 | 15.7 | 3 |
| West Dunbartonshire | Graeme McCormick | 8,497 | 20.1 | 2 |

=== By-elections, 2010–15 ===
| By-election | Candidate | Votes | % | Position |
|---|---|---|---|---|
| 2011 Inverclyde by-election | Anne McLaughlin | 9,280 | 33.0 | 2 |

=== 2015 general election ===
| Constituency | Candidate | Votes | % | Position |
|---|---|---|---|---|
| Aberdeen North | Kirsty Blackman | 24,793 | 56.4 | 1 |
| Aberdeen South | Callum McCaig | 20,221 | 41.6 | 1 |
| Airdrie and Shotts | Neil Gray | 23,887 | 53.9 | 1 |
| Angus | Mike Weir | 24,130 | 54.2 | 1 |
| Argyll and Bute | Brendan O'Hara | 22,959 | 44.3 | 1 |
| Ayr, Carrick and Cumnock | Corri Wilson | 25,492 | 48.8 | 1 |
| Banff and Buchan | Eilidh Whiteford | 27,487 | 60.2 | 1 |
| Berwickshire, Roxburgh and Selkirk | Calum Kerr | 20,145 | 36.6 | 1 |
| Caithness, Sutherland and Easter Ross | Paul Monaghan | 15,831 | 46.3 | 1 |
| Central Ayrshire | Philippa Whitford | 26,999 | 53.2 | 1 |
| Coatbridge, Chryston and Bellshill | Phil Boswell | 28,696 | 56.6 | 1 |
| Cumbernauld, Kilsyth and Kirkintilloch East | Stuart McDonald | 29,572 | 59.9 | 1 |
| Dumfries and Galloway | Richard Arkless | 23,440 | 41.4 | 1 |
| Dumfriesshire, Clydesdale and Tweeddale | Emma Harper | 19,961 | 38.3 | 2 |
| Dundee East | Stewart Hosie | 28,765 | 59.7 | 1 |
| Dundee West | Chris Law | 27,684 | 61.9 | 1 |
| Dunfermline and West Fife | Douglas Chapman | 28,096 | 50.3 | 1 |
| East Dunbartonshire | John Nicolson | 22,093 | 40.3 | 1 |
| East Kilbride, Strathaven and Lesmahagow | Lisa Cameron | 33,678 | 55.6 | 1 |
| East Lothian | George Kerevan | 25,104 | 42.5 | 1 |
| East Renfrewshire | Kirsten Oswald | 23,013 | 40.6 | 1 |
| Edinburgh East | Tommy Sheppard | 23,188 | 49.2 | 1 |
| Edinburgh North and Leith | Deidre Brock | 23,742 | 40.9 | 1 |
| Edinburgh South | Neil Hay | 16,656 | 33.8 | 2 |
| Edinburgh South West | Joanna Cherry | 22,168 | 43.0 | 1 |
| Edinburgh West | Michelle Thomson | 21,378 | 39.0 | 1 |
| Falkirk | John McNally | 34,831 | 57.7 | 1 |
| Glasgow Central | Alison Thewliss | 20,658 | 52.5 | 1 |
| Glasgow East | Natalie McGarry | 24,116 | 56.9 | 1 |
| Glasgow North | Patrick Grady | 19,610 | 53.1 | 1 |
| Glasgow North East | Anne McLaughlin | 21,976 | 58.1 | 1 |
| Glasgow North West | Carol Monaghan | 23,908 | 54.5 | 1 |
| Glasgow South | Stewart McDonald | 26,773 | 54.9 | 1 |
| Glasgow South West | Chris Stephens | 23,388 | 57.2 | 1 |
| Glenrothes | Peter Grant | 28,459 | 59.8 | 1 |
| Gordon | Alex Salmond | 27,717 | 47.7 | 1 |
| Inverclyde | Ronnie Cowan | 24,585 | 55.1 | 1 |
| Inverness, Nairn, Badenoch and Strathspey | Drew Hendry | 28,838 | 50.1 | 1 |
| Kilmarnock and Loudoun | Alan Brown | 30,000 | 55.7 | 1 |
| Kirkcaldy and Cowdenbeath | Roger Mullin | 27,628 | 52.2 | 1 |
| Lanark and Hamilton East | Angela Crawley | 29,976 | 48.8 | 1 |
| Linlithgow and East Falkirk | Martyn Day | 32,055 | 52.0 | 1 |
| Livingston | Hannah Bardell | 32,736 | 56.9 | 1 |
| Midlothian | Owen Thompson | 24,453 | 50.6 | 1 |
| Moray | Angus Robertson | 24,384 | 49.5 | 1 |
| Motherwell and Wishaw | Marion Fellows | 27,275 | 56.5 | 1 |
| Na h-Eileanan an Iar | Angus MacNeil | 8,662 | 54.3 | 1 |
| North Ayrshire and Arran | Patricia Gibson | 28,641 | 53.2 | 1 |
| North East Fife | Stephen Gethins | 18,523 | 40.9 | 1 |
| Ochil and South Perthshire | Tasmina Ahmed-Sheikh | 26,620 | 46.0 | 1 |
| Orkney and Shetland | Danus Skene | 8,590 | 37.8 | 2 |
| Paisley and Renfrew North | Gavin Newlands | 25,601 | 50.7 | 1 |
| Paisley and Renfrewshire South | Mhairi Black | 23,548 | 50.9 | 1 |
| Perth and North Perthshire | Pete Wishart | 27,379 | 50.5 | 1 |
| Ross, Skye and Lochaber | Ian Blackford | 20,119 | 48.1 | 1 |
| Rutherglen and Hamilton West | Margaret Ferrier | 30,279 | 52.6 | 1 |
| Stirling | Steven Paterson | 23,783 | 45.6 | 1 |
| West Aberdeenshire and Kincardine | Stuart Donaldson | 22,949 | 41.6 | 1 |
| West Dunbartonshire | Martin Docherty | 30,198 | 59.0 | 1 |

=== 2017 general election ===
| Constituency | Candidate | Votes | % | Position |
|---|---|---|---|---|
| Aberdeen North | Kirsty Blackman | 15,170 | 41.3 | 1 |
| Aberdeen South | Callum McCaig | 13,994 | 31.5 | 2 |
| Airdrie and Shotts | Neil Gray | 14,291 | 37.6 | 1 |
| Angus | Mike Weir | 15,503 | 38.6 | 2 |
| Argyll and Bute | Brendan O'Hara | 17,304 | 36.0 | 2 |
| Ayr, Carrick and Cumnock | Corri Wilson | 15,776 | 34.1 | 2 |
| Banff and Buchan | Eilidh Whiteford | 16,283 | 39.1 | 2 |
| Berwickshire, Roxburgh and Selkirk | Calum Kerr | 17,153 | 32.8 | 2 |
| Caithness, Sutherland and Easter Ross | Paul Monaghan | 9,017 | 29.2 | 2 |
| Central Ayrshire | Philippa Whitford | 16,771 | 37.2 | 1 |
| Coatbridge, Chryston and Bellshill | Phil Boswell | 17,607 | 39.1 | 2 |
| Cumbernauld, Kilsyth and Kirkintilloch East | Stuart McDonald | 19,122 | 43.6 | 1 |
| Dumfries and Galloway | Richard Arkless | 16,701 | 32.4 | 2 |
| Dumfriesshire, Clydesdale and Tweeddale | Mairi McAllan | 14,736 | 30.1 | 2 |
| Dundee East | Stewart Hosie | 18,391 | 42.8 | 1 |
| Dundee West | Chris Law | 18,045 | 46.7 | 1 |
| Dunfermline and West Fife | Douglas Chapman | 18,121 | 35.5 | 1 |
| East Dunbartonshire | John Nicolson | 15,684 | 30.3 | 2 |
| East Kilbride, Strathaven and Lesmahagow | Lisa Cameron | 21,023 | 38.9 | 1 |
| East Lothian | George Kerevan | 17,075 | 30.6 | 2 |
| East Renfrewshire | Kirsten Oswald | 16,784 | 31.2 | 2 |
| Edinburgh East | Tommy Sheppard | 18,509 | 42.5 | 1 |
| Edinburgh North and Leith | Deidre Brock | 19,243 | 34.0 | 1 |
| Edinburgh South | Jim Eadie | 10,755 | 22.5 | 2 |
| Edinburgh South West | Joanna Cherry | 17,575 | 35.6 | 1 |
| Edinburgh West | Toni Giugliano | 15,120 | 28.6 | 2 |
| Falkirk | John McNally | 20,952 | 38.9 | 1 |
| Glasgow Central | Alison Thewliss | 16,096 | 44.7 | 1 |
| Glasgow East | David Linden | 14,024 | 38.8 | 1 |
| Glasgow North | Patrick Grady | 12,597 | 37.6 | 1 |
| Glasgow North East | Anne McLaughlin | 13,395 | 42.2 | 2 |
| Glasgow North West | Carol Monaghan | 16,508 | 42.5 | 1 |
| Glasgow South | Stewart McDonald | 18,312 | 41.1 | 1 |
| Glasgow South West | Chris Stephens | 14,386 | 40.7 | 1 |
| Glenrothes | Peter Grant | 17,291 | 42.8 | 1 |
| Gordon | Alex Salmond | 19,254 | 35.9 | 2 |
| Inverclyde | Ronnie Cowan | 15,050 | 38.5 | 1 |
| Inverness, Nairn, Badenoch and Strathspey | Drew Hendry | 21,042 | 39.9 | 1 |
| Kilmarnock and Loudoun | Alan Brown | 19,690 | 42.3 | 1 |
| Kirkcaldy and Cowdenbeath | Roger Mullin | 16,757 | 36.3 | 2 |
| Lanark and Hamilton East | Angela Crawley | 16,444 | 32.6 | 1 |
| Linlithgow and East Falkirk | Martyn Day | 20,388 | 36.3 | 1 |
| Livingston | Hannah Bardell | 21,036 | 40.1 | 1 |
| Midlothian | Owen Thompson | 15,573 | 34.4 | 2 |
| Moray | Angus Robertson | 18,478 | 38.8 | 2 |
| Motherwell and Wishaw | Marion Fellows | 16,150 | 38.5 | 1 |
| Na h-Eileanan an Iar | Angus MacNeil | 6,013 | 40.6 | 1 |
| North Ayrshire and Arran | Patricia Gibson | 18,451 | 38.9 | 1 |
| North East Fife | Stephen Gethins | 13,743 | 32.9 | 1 |
| Ochil and South Perthshire | Tasmina Ahmed-Sheikh | 19,110 | 35.3 | 2 |
| Orkney and Shetland | Miriam Brett | 6,749 | 29.0 | 2 |
| Paisley and Renfrew North | Gavin Newlands | 17,455 | 37.4 | 1 |
| Paisley and Renfrewshire South | Mhairi Black | 16,964 | 40.7 | 1 |
| Perth and North Perthshire | Pete Wishart | 21,804 | 42.3 | 1 |
| Ross, Skye and Lochaber | Ian Blackford | 15,480 | 40.2 | 1 |
| Rutherglen and Hamilton West | Margaret Ferrier | 18,836 | 37.0 | 2 |
| Stirling | Steven Paterson | 18,143 | 36.8 | 2 |
| West Aberdeenshire and Kincardine | Stuart Donaldson | 16,755 | 32.5 | 2 |
| West Dunbartonshire | Martin Docherty-Hughes | 18,890 | 42.9 | 1 |

=== 2019 general election ===
| Constituency | Candidate | Votes | % | Position |
|---|---|---|---|---|
| Aberdeen North | Kirsty Blackman | 20,205 | 54.0 | 1 |
| Aberdeen South | Stephen Flynn | 20,388 | 44.7 | 1 |
| Airdrie and Shotts | Neil Gray | 17,929 | 45.0 | 1 |
| Angus | Dave Doogan | 21,216 | 49.1 | 1 |
| Argyll and Bute | Brendan O'Hara | 21,040 | 43.8 | 1 |
| Ayr, Carrick and Cumnock | Allan Dorans | 20,272 | 43.5 | 1 |
| Banff and Buchan | Paul Robertson | 17,064 | 40.4 | 2 |
| Berwickshire, Roxburgh and Selkirk | Calum Kerr | 20,599 | 38.8 | 2 |
| Caithness, Sutherland and Easter Ross | Karl Rosie | 11,501 | 36.6 | 2 |
| Central Ayrshire | Philippa Whitford | 21,483 | 46.2 | 1 |
| Coatbridge, Chryston and Bellshill | Steven Bonnar | 22,680 | 46.9 | 1 |
| Cumbernauld, Kilsyth and Kirkintilloch East | Stuart McDonald | 24,158 | 52.7 | 1 |
| Dumfries and Galloway | Richard Arkless | 20,873 | 40.6 | 2 |
| Dumfriesshire, Clydesdale and Tweeddale | Amanda Burgauer | 18,830 | 38.3 | 2 |
| Dundee East | Stewart Hosie | 24,361 | 53.8 | 1 |
| Dundee West | Chris Law | 22,355 | 53.8 | 1 |
| Dunfermline and West Fife | Douglas Chapman | 23,727 | 44.4 | 1 |
| East Dunbartonshire | Amy Callaghan | 19,672 | 37.1 | 1 |
| East Kilbride, Strathaven and Lesmahagow | Lisa Cameron | 26,113 | 46.4 | 1 |
| East Lothian | Kenny MacAskill | 21,156 | 36.2 | 1 |
| East Renfrewshire | Kirsten Oswald | 24,877 | 44.9 | 1 |
| Edinburgh East | Tommy Sheppard | 23,165 | 48.4 | 1 |
| Edinburgh North and Leith | Deidre Brock | 25,925 | 43.7 | 1 |
| Edinburgh South | Catriona McDonald | 12,650 | 25.4 | 2 |
| Edinburgh South West | Joanna Cherry | 24,830 | 47.6 | 1 |
| Edinburgh West | Sarah Masson | 17,997 | 33.0 | 2 |
| Falkirk | John McNally | 29,351 | 52.5 | 1 |
| Glasgow Central | Alison Thewliss | 19,750 | 49.2 | 1 |
| Glasgow East | David Linden | 18,357 | 47.7 | 1 |
| Glasgow North | Patrick Grady | 16,982 | 46.9 | 1 |
| Glasgow North East | Anne McLaughlin | 15,911 | 46.9 | 1 |
| Glasgow North West | Carol Monaghan | 19,678 | 49.5 | 1 |
| Glasgow South | Stewart McDonald | 22,829 | 48.1 | 1 |
| Glasgow South West | Chris Stephens | 17,643 | 47.9 | 1 |
| Glenrothes | Peter Grant | 21,234 | 51.1 | 1 |
| Gordon | Richard Thomson | 23,885 | 42.7 | 1 |
| Inverclyde | Ronnie Cowan | 19,295 | 48.4 | 1 |
| Inverness, Nairn, Badenoch and Strathspey | Drew Hendry | 26,247 | 47.9 | 1 |
| Kilmarnock and Loudoun | Alan Brown | 24,216 | 50.8 | 1 |
| Kirkcaldy and Cowdenbeath | Neale Hanvey | 16,568 | 35.2 | 1 |
| Lanark and Hamilton East | Angela Crawley | 22,243 | 41.9 | 1 |
| Linlithgow and East Falkirk | Martyn Day | 25,551 | 44.2 | 1 |
| Livingston | Hannah Bardell | 25,617 | 46.9 | 1 |
| Midlothian | Owen Thompson | 20,033 | 41.5 | 1 |
| Moray | Laura Mitchell | 21,599 | 44.2 | 2 |
| Motherwell and Wishaw | Marion Fellows | 20,622 | 46.4 | 1 |
| Na h-Eileanan an Iar | Angus MacNeil | 6,531 | 45.1 | 1 |
| North Ayrshire and Arran | Patricia Gibson | 23,376 | 48.5 | 1 |
| North East Fife | Stephen Gethins | 18,447 | 40.2 | 2 |
| Ochil and South Perthshire | John Nicolson | 26,882 | 46.5 | 1 |
| Orkney and Shetland | Robert Leslie | 7,874 | 34.0 | 2 |
| Paisley and Renfrew North | Gavin Newlands | 23,353 | 47.0 | 1 |
| Paisley and Renfrewshire South | Mhairi Black | 21,637 | 50.2 | 1 |
| Perth and North Perthshire | Pete Wishart | 27,362 | 50.6 | 1 |
| Ross, Skye and Lochaber | Ian Blackford | 19,263 | 48.3 | 1 |
| Rutherglen and Hamilton West | Margaret Ferrier | 23,775 | 44.2 | 1 |
| Stirling | Alyn Smith | 26,895 | 51.1 | 1 |
| West Aberdeenshire | Fergus Mutch | 21,909 | 41.1 | 2 |
| West Dunbartonshire | Martin Docherty-Hughes | 22,396 | 49.6 | 1 |

=== By-elections, 2019–present ===
| By-election | Candidate | Votes | % | Position |
|---|---|---|---|---|
| 2021 Airdrie and Shotts by-election | Anum Qaisar | 10,129 | 46.4 | 1 |
| 2023 Rutherglen and Hamilton West by-election | Katy Loudon | 8,399 | 27.6 | 2 |
