= David Alexander =

David Alexander may refer to:

== Entertainers ==
- David Alexander (director) (1914–1983), American television director
- Dave Alexander (blues musician) (1938–2012), American West Coast blues pianist & bassist
- David M. Alexander (born 1945), American writer
- Dave Alexander (musician) (1947–1975), American bassist for Iggy Pop & The Stooges
- David Alexander (singer) (1929–1995), Welsh singer and entertainer
- David Alexander, better known as The Dirtball (born 1974), American rapper

== Politicians ==
- David W. Alexander (1812–1887), Los Angeles County Board of Supervisors
- David Lindo Alexander (1842–1922), British lawyer and Jewish community leader
- David Alexander (Tennessee politician) (born 1952), American state legislator in Tennessee
- David Alexander (Scottish politician) (born 1958), Scottish leader of Falkirk local authority, Scotland
- David J. Alexander (born 1981), member of the Connecticut House of Representatives

== Sportsmen ==
- David Alexander (footballer) (1869–1941), Scottish footballer
- David Alexander (American football) (born 1964), American former NFL player
- David Alexander (rugby league) (born 1968), Australian former NSWRL/ARL player

== Others ==
- David Alexander (college president) (1932–2010), American academic, president of Pomona College and US National Secretary to the Rhodes Trust
- David Alexander (Royal Marines officer) (1926–2017), British Royal Marines officer
- David T. Alexander (born 1947), Canadian painter
