= Radio Scotland (pirate radio) =

Offshore pirate radio station

Coordinates: 56.0000°N 2.5145°W

- Scotland
- Broadcast area: Scotland, Northern Ireland, parts of eastern England
- Frequency: 1241 kHz (242 m MW)
- Branding: Radio Scotland

Programming
- Languages: English, Scots
- Format: Top 40, Ceilidh, Pop

Ownership
- Owner: Tommy Shields

History
- First air date: 31 December 1965
- Last air date: 14 August 1967
- Former names: Radio Scotland and Ireland

Radio Scotland was an offshore pirate radio station broadcasting on 1241 kHz mediumwave (242 metres), created by Tommy Shields in 1965. The station was on the former lightship L.V. Comet, which had been fitted out as a radio station in Guernsey using RCA technology and engineers, it was anchored at locations off Scotland, usually outside territorial waters.

== History ==
The station began on 31 December 1965 and featured DJs including Paul Young, Richard Park, Stuart Henry and Jack McLaughlin with a céilidh programme that promised to tickle the "tartan tonsils". Later disc-jockeys included John Kerr, Tony Allan, Ben Healy, Mark Wesley (as Mark West), Alan Black, David Kinnaird, Charlie Whyte, Pete Bowman, Larry Marshall, Bryan Vaughan, Mel Howard, Roger Gale (now Sir Roger Gale, Conservative MP and Deputy Speaker of the House of Commons), Eddie White, Drew Hamlyn, Jimmy Mack, Cathy Spence, Stevie Merike and Brian McKenzie (as Brian Webb). Its headquarters, Radio Scotland House, was a building at Cranworth Street, Hillhead in Glasgow. Cranworth Street also made taped programmes - using 1/4" magnetic tape - which were taken to the ship by tender.

The Comet was initially off Dunbar on the east coast and had strong coverage of Edinburgh, but not as clearly in Glasgow. Shields moved the ship in April 1966 to Troon off Arran on the west coast, but it had no engine so it had to be towed. Adding to expense was that the station remained on air, meaning a longer route outside territorial waters.

The anchorages off the west coast of Scotland were found to be within territorial waters and the company was fined £80, bringing a move to Ballywalter, off County Down, Northern Ireland, the station changing its name to Radio Scotland and Ireland. Then RTÉ claimed the station was causing adjacent channel interference to its Dublin transmitter on 1250 kHz. Transmissions to the east of Scotland were worse from this location, so Shields took the ship to off Fife Ness and the Isle of May. As well as giving eastern Scotland a strong signal, the "water run" meant the signal didn't hit land until Grangemouth in Stirlingshire, about 20 miles (32 km) from Glasgow. So the Central Belt at last had a listenable signal. Peter Alex's 1966 book Who's Who In Pop Radio claimed that as well as covering Scotland and Northern Ireland, the station's reception area included the east coast of England down to Cambridge.'

The station was popular in Scotland with the '242 Clan' fan club' and 242 monthly magazine. It was also seen as profitable, and one of the 'big six' pirate stations, along with Caroline South, Caroline North, Radio London, Radio 390 and Radio 270.

The station closed on 14 August 1967 with the Marine, &c., Broadcasting (Offences) Act 1967. Shields had repeatedly lobbied the Government to exempt Radio Scotland and wanted terms under which the station might continue legally. One of his arguments was that the station broadcast into areas where it was not possible to receive BBC radio. Shields died just six months after the station's closure, aged 49.

The majority of the crew and presenters were at a party in Glasgow to say farewell to Radio Scotland on the last night. It was left to Andy Main, electrical engineer and occasional late night DJ, to give the last transmission and put Radio Scotland off air. Prior to the recorded 'last hour' show which finished at 11.59 pm, Tony Allan and Mark West presented a programme talking about past shows and DJs and playing their signature tunes.

Many presenters went to other stations, including BBC Radio 1, Radio Caroline, Radio Luxembourg, Radio Clyde and BBC Radio Scotland.

== See also ==
- Radio Free Scotland
