= David Rollo =

David Rollo may refer to:

- David Rollo (footballer) (1891–1963), Northern Ireland association football player
- David Rollo (politician) (1919–2006), Scottish nationalist politician and pirate radio broadcaster
- David Rollo (rugby union) (born 1934), Scottish rugby player
