= Martin O'Neill, Baron O'Neill of Clackmannan =

Scottish Labour politician (1945–2020)

The Right Honourable The Lord O'Neill of Clackmannan
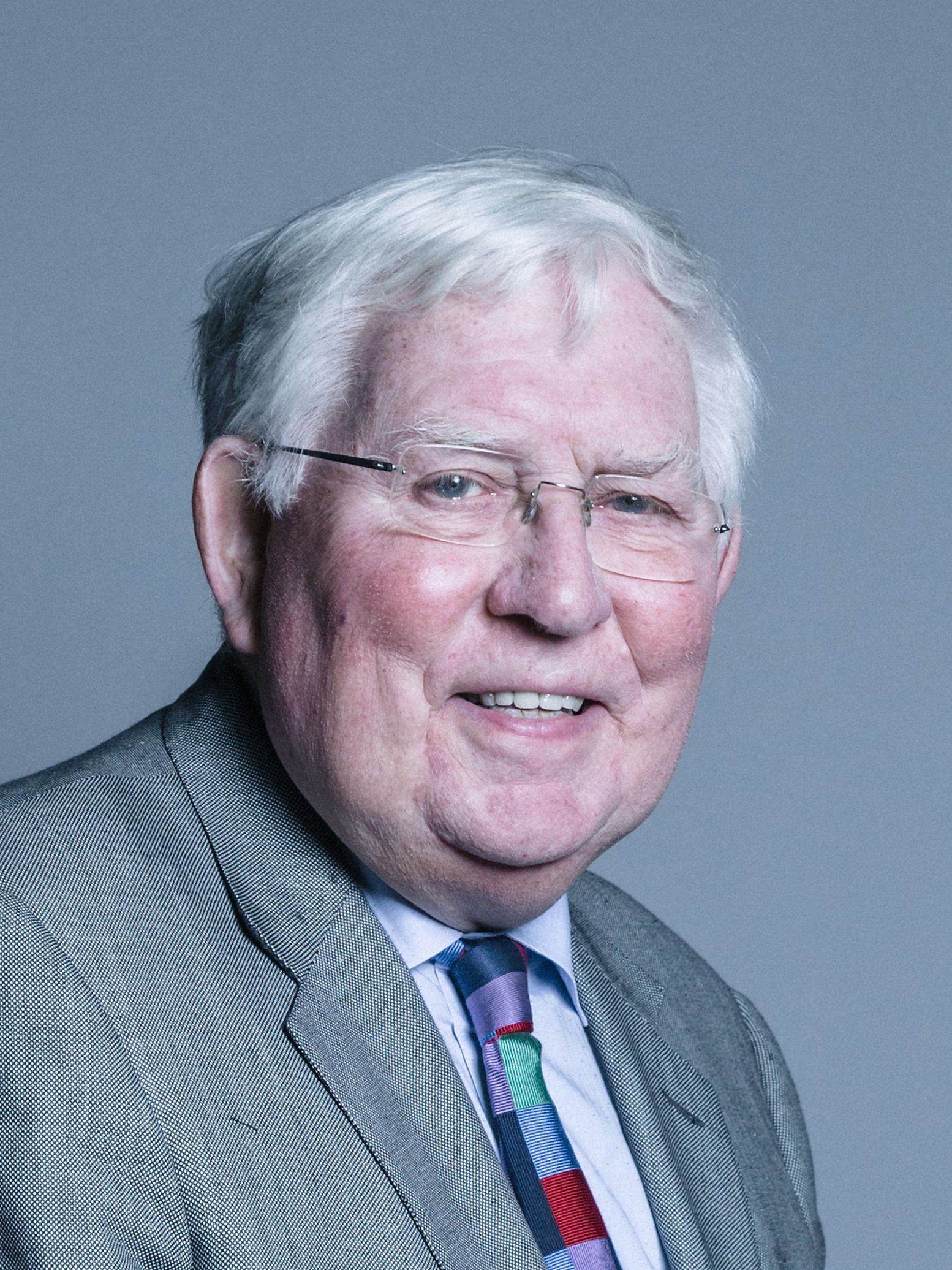
- Official portrait, 2018

Chair of the Trade and Industry Select Committee
- In office 27 November 1995 – 11 April 2005
- Preceded by: Richard Caborn
- Succeeded by: Peter Luff

Shadow Secretary of State for Defence
- In office 14 June 1988 – 18 July 1992
- Leader: Neil Kinnock
- Preceded by: Denzil Davies
- Succeeded by: David Clark

Member of the House of Lords
- Lord Temporal
- Life peerage 14 June 2005 – 26 August 2020

Member of Parliament for Ochil: Clackmannan (1983–1997); Clackmannan and Eastern Stirlingshire (1979–1983)
- In office 3 May 1979 – 11 April 2005
- Preceded by: George Reid
- Succeeded by: Constituency abolished

Personal details
- Born: Martin John O'Neill; 6 January 1945
- Died: 26 August 2020 (aged 75)
- Party: Labour
- Spouse: Elaine Marjorie Samuel (m. 1973)
- Children: 2
- Education: Trinity Academy, Edinburgh
- Alma mater: Heriot-Watt University

Martin John O'Neill, Baron O'Neill of Clackmannan (6 January 1945 – 26 August 2020) was a Scottish Labour politician who served as a Member of Parliament (MP) from 1979 until 2005 and as a member of the House of Lords from 2005 until his death.

== Early life and career ==
He was educated at Trinity Academy, Edinburgh, at the time a selective state school, and then Heriot-Watt College / Heriot-Watt University, where he attained a BA in economics. After leaving university, he worked as an insurance clerk and then became active in the Scottish Union of Students, including serving as its president from 1970 until 1971.

He married his wife Elaine Marjorie Samuel on 21 July 1973, with them going on to raise two sons together.

== Parliamentary career ==
After unsuccessfully contesting Edinburgh North in October 1974, he was a Labour Member of Parliament between 1979 and 2005, representing the Clackmannan and Eastern Stirlingshire, Clackmannan and Ochil seats successively. He was shadow defence secretary and later was Chairman of the Trade and Industry select committee.

== House of Lords ==
On 13 May 2005 it was announced that he would be created a life peer, and on 14 June 2005 was created Baron O'Neill of Clackmannan, of Clackmannan in Clackmannanshire.

== Outside politics ==
O'Neill served as Chairman of the Strategic Forum for Construction and the Nuclear Industry Association.

He was a lifelong supporter of Hibernian F.C. and was a director of the club for a few years.

O'Neill was also a patron of Humanists UK, and was one of the fifty signatories to a letter published in The Guardian in 2010, which called for Pope Benedict XVI not to be given a state visit to the UK, and accused the Catholic Church of increasing the spread of AIDS and promoting segregated education.

He received an Honorary Doctorate from Heriot-Watt University in 2011 and was an honorary associate of the National Secular Society.

== Death ==
O'Neill died in August 2020 at the age of 75.

Parliament of the United Kingdom
Preceded by George Reid	Member of Parliament for Clackmannan and Eastern Stirlingshire; 1979–1983	Constituency abolished
New constituency	Member of Parliament for Clackmannan; 1983–1997	Constituency abolished
New constituency	Member of Parliament for Ochil; 1997–2005	Constituency abolished

Baronage of Scotland
Preceded by Capt. Hon. William Henry Bruce Ogilive	Baron of Clackmannan; 2005-2020	Succeeded by Hon. Michael O'Neill
