= Janette Jones =

Janette Jones (August 1931 – October 1989) was a Scottish nationalist politician. A Vice Chair of the Scottish National Party (SNP), she has been described as one of four women to contribute "in important ways to the party's development".

Born into a working-class family in Kilsyth, Jones studied at Kilsyth Academy before marrying and having four children. She joined the SNP and won a seat on Kilsyth Burgh Council. She also sat on the SNP's executive, serving as Vice Chairman with responsibility for publicity, and later as vice president of the party.

Jones stood for the SNP in West Stirlingshire in both the February and October 1974 general elections, this second election being her best performance, coming only 367 votes behind the winner. She stood again in 1979, then in Clackmannan at the 1983 general election, and finally Mid Scotland and Fife at the 1984 European Parliament election.

In writing about the leaders of the SNP, James Mitchell acknowledges that, like 20th-century Scottish politics in general, the SNP leadership was male-dominated, but names Jones alongside Margaret Ewing, Isobel Lindsay and Margo Macdonald as the women who contributed "in important ways to the party's development".

Jones died in Strathcarron hospice, Denny in October 1989. In 2004, when Winifred Ewing wrote a tribute to her in her own autobiography, describing her as "one of the most loved activists the party ever had".

Party political offices
Preceded by Douglas Crawford	Scottish National Party Vice Chair (Publicity); 1975–1977	Succeeded by Stephen Maxwell
Preceded by Stephen Maxwell	Scottish National Party Vice Chair (Local Government); 1982–1983	Succeeded by Gordon Murray
