= Hugh MacDonald (Scottish politician) =

British politician (1929–2013)

Hugh MacDonald (11 July 1929 – 3 December 2013), also known as Uisdean MacDonald, was a Scottish nationalist activist.

Born in the Possilpark area of Glasgow to parents who both worked in bottling factories, MacDonald learned Gaelic at night school at a young age. He worked initially as an electrical engineer, then later as an advertising salesman, first for the Evening Citizen, then for the Glasgow Herald group.

MacDonald joined the Scottish National Party (SNP), and was involved with various activities in the party prior to the electoral successes of the 1960s, including co-authoring the early songbooks of the Bo'ness Rebels Literary Society.

He stood unsuccessfully in Glasgow Maryhill at the 1966 general election, taking 11.5% of the vote. He worked with George Leslie and Morris Blythman to develop campaign music at the 1967 Glasgow Pollok by-election, was a leading figure in Winnie Ewing's victory in 1967 Hamilton by-election, and his house was used as a base for the party's successful campaign in the 1973 Glasgow Govan by-election. He was appointed as a vice-chairman of the party in 1969, sharing responsibility for publicity with Michael Grieve. MacDonald's particular focus was the media, but the division of labour did not work well, and he stood down in 1972.

MacDonald next moved to Iran to work in advertising for the Kayhan Newspaper Group, leaving only on the outbreak of the Iranian Revolution. He returned to Glasgow to work for the Rex Stewart agency, and unsuccessfully attempted to sue the Ayatollah Khomeini for the return of possessions which he had left on fleeing Iran.

Ill health compelled MacDonald to take early retirement, and he devoted his remaining years to freemasonry and in particular its Knights Templar group.

Party political offices
Preceded by James Braid	Scottish National Party Vice Chairman (Publicity); 1969–1972 with Michael Grieve	Succeeded by Isobel Lindsay
