= Albert McQuarrie =

British politician (1918–2016)

Sir Albert McQuarrie

Member of Parliament for Banff and Buchan
- In office 9 June 1983 – 18 May 1987
- Monarch: Elizabeth II
- Preceded by: Constituency established
- Succeeded by: Alex Salmond

Member of Parliament for East Aberdeenshire
- In office 3 May 1979 – 13 May 1983
- Monarch: Elizabeth II
- Preceded by: Douglas Henderson
- Succeeded by: Constituency abolished

Personal details
- Born: 1 January 1918 Greenock, Inverclyde, Scotland
- Died: 13 January 2016 (aged 98) Mintlaw, Aberdeenshire, Scotland
- Party: Conservative
- Education: Royal College of Science and Technology

Sir Albert McQuarrie (1 January 1918 – 13 January 2016) was a British Conservative politician who served as a Member of Parliament (MP) from 1979 to 1987.

== Early life ==
Albert McQuarrie was born on 1 January 1918 in Greenock, Inverclyde. McQuarrie was the son of Algernon McQuarrie, a Greenock shipping businessman.

He was educated at Greenock High School and the Royal College of Science and Technology, Glasgow. He became a design consultant and served as a councillor on Greenock Town Council from 1949 to 1955.

== Military service ==
McQuarrie joined the British Army in 1939 at the outbreak of World War II, serving in the Royal Engineers.

== Parliamentary career ==
McQuarrie unsuccessfully contested Kilmarnock in 1966, and Caithness and Sutherland in October 1974. He was Member of Parliament (MP) for East Aberdeenshire from 1979 to 1983, gaining the seat from the Scottish National Party's Douglas Henderson with a majority of only 558. He was then MP for Banff and Buchan from 1983 to 1987, when he lost his seat to future SNP leader Alex Salmond. In the House of Commons he was Chairman of the British Gibraltar All Party Group. He campaigned for the retention of British sovereignty over Gibraltar. McQuarrie was knighted in 1987. McQuarrie died in January 2016 at his home in Mintlaw, aged 98. He was nicknamed the "Buchan Bulldog" during his time in Parliament.

== Personal life ==
McQuarrie married his first wife, Roseleen McCaffery, in 1945.

Parliament of the United Kingdom
Preceded by Douglas Henderson	Member of Parliament for East Aberdeenshire; 1979–1983	Constituency abolished
New constituency	Member of Parliament for Banff and Buchan; 1983–1987	Succeeded by Alex Salmond
