= Ochil (UK Parliament constituency) =

UK Parliament constituency (1997–2005)

- Former county constituency for the House of Commons
- Boundary of Ochil in Scotland for the 2001 general election

1997–2005
- Seats: One
- Created from: Clackmannan
- Replaced by: Ochil & South Perthshire; Stirling

Ochil was a county constituency of the House of Commons of the Parliament of the United Kingdom from 1997 until 2005. It elected one Member of Parliament (MP by the first-past-the-post voting system.

It replaced the former constituency of Clackmannan. In 2005 it was mostly merged into the new constituency of Ochil and South Perthshire. A western portion was merged into Stirling.

== Boundaries ==
Clackmannan District, the Stirling District electoral divisions of Airthrey and Cairseland, and the Perth and Kinross District electoral division of Kinross.

The constituency included Alloa, Clackmannan, Tillicoultry, Dollar and Kinross. It covered Clackmannanshire and small portions of Stirlingshire and Perth and Kinross.

== Members of Parliament ==
Elected	Member	Party
1997	Martin O'Neill	Labour
2005	constituency abolished	

== Election results ==
=== Elections in the 2000s ===
General election 2001: Ochil
Party	Candidate	Votes	%	±%
Labour	Martin O'Neill	16,004	45.3	+0.3
SNP	Keith Brown	10,655	30.2	−4.2
Conservative	Alasdair Campbell	4,235	12.0	−2.6
Liberal Democrats	Paul Edie	3,253	9.2	+4.0
Scottish Socialist	Pauline Thomson	751	2.1	New
Monster Raving Loony	Flash Gordon Approaching	405	1.1	New
Majority		5,349	15.1	+4.5
Turnout		35,303	61.3	−16.1
Labour hold		Swing	+2.3	

=== Elections in the 1990s ===
General election 1997: Ochil
Party	Candidate	Votes	%	±%
Labour	Martin O'Neill	19,707	45.0	
SNP	George Reid	15,055	34.4	
Conservative	Allan J.M. Hogarth	6,383	14.6	
Liberal Democrats	Ann M. Watters	2,262	5.2	
Referendum	Derek H.F. White	210	0.5	
Democratic Nationalist	Ian D. Macdonald	104	0.2	
Natural Law	Mike S. Sullivan	65	0.1	
Majority		4,652	10.6	
Turnout		43,786	77.4	
Labour win (new seat)				
