= James Braid (politician) =

Scottish nationalist politician

James Braid OBE (1 April 1912 – 26 May 1999), sometimes known as Jimmy Braid or Jas Braid, was a Scottish nationalist politician.

Born at Newark, St Monans, Braid studied at the Waid Academy in Anstruther before becoming a painter and decorator. He joined the Scottish National Party (SNP) and was elected to St Monans Burgh Council before World War II. During the war, he served as a pilot with the Royal Air Force's Bomber Command, receiving the Distinguished Flying Cross, then, on his return, began working for the local electricity board.

First elected provost of St Monans in the 1950s, Braid filled the post on multiple occasions, and was also successful in winning election to North East Fife District Council and Fife County Council. He came to greater attention with a lively speech at the SNP conference in 1964, Following this, he worked with James C. Lees and Ian Macdonald to set up new branches of the party, and in 1966 was elected as a vice-chairman of the party, with responsibility for publicity.

He also stood for the SNP in East Fife at the 1964, 1966, 1970, February and October 1974 general elections, gradually increasing his share of the vote from 6.8% to 31.8%, although he was never elected.

Braid once parked his car on the pier at St Monans, then, on returning, accidentally reversed it into the harbour. He emerged unharmed.

In 1975, Braid was awarded the freedom of the burgh of St Monans. He remained a member of the SNP up until he died but continued to sit as an independent councillor, winning his final election early in 1999, and by his death was the longest-serving councillor in Scotland.

Party political offices
Preceded by William Wolfe	Scottish National Party Vice Chairman (Publicity); 1966–1969	Succeeded by Michael Grieve and Hugh MacDonald
