= Clackmannan (constituency) =

UK Parliament constituency (1983–1997)

- Former county constituency for the House of Commons
- Subdivisions of Scotland: Clackmannan

1983–1997
- Seats: One
- Created from: Clackmannan & East Stirlingshire and parts of Stirlingshire West and Kinross and West Perthshire
- Replaced by: Ochil and Falkirk East

Clackmannan was a parliamentary constituency in the Clackmannan area of Central Scotland. It returned one Member of Parliament (MP) to the House of Commons of the Parliament of the United Kingdom, elected by the first past the post system.

The constituency was created for the 1983 general election, replacing the previous Clackmannan and East Stirlingshire constituency. The Clackmannan constituency was abolished for the 1997 general election.

== Boundaries ==
Clackmannan District, the Falkirk District electoral division of Carseland, and the Stirling District electoral division of Kinnaird.

== Members of Parliament ==
Election	Member	Party
1983	Martin O'Neill	Labour
1997	constituency abolished: see Ochil	

== Election results ==
=== Elections of the 1980s ===
General election 1983: Clackmannan
Party	Candidate	Votes	%	±%
Labour	Martin O'Neill	16,478	45.8	+0.2
SNP	Janette Jones	6,839	19.0	−17.8
Conservative	Charles Hendry	6,490	18.0	+0.4
SDP	Hilary Campbell	6,205	17.2	New
Majority		9,639	26.8	+18.0
Turnout		36,012	75.6	
Labour win (new seat)				

General election 1987: Clackmannan
Party	Candidate	Votes	%	±%
Labour	Martin O'Neill	20,317	53.7	+7.9
SNP	Allan Macartney	7,916	20.9	+1.9
Conservative	James Parker	5,620	14.9	−3.1
SDP	Ann Watters	3,961	10.5	−6.7
Majority		12,401	32.8	+6.0
Turnout		37,814	77.0	+1.4
Labour hold		Swing	+3.0	

=== Elections of the 1990s ===
General election 1992: Clackmannan
Party	Candidate	Votes	%	±%
Labour	Martin O'Neill	18,829	49.1	−4.6
SNP	Andrew Brophy	10,326	26.9	+6.0
Conservative	James Mackie	6,638	17.3	+2.4
Liberal Democrats	Ann Watters	2,567	6.7	−3.8
Majority		8,503	22.2	−10.6
Turnout		38,360	78.3	+1.3
Labour hold		Swing	−5.3	
