= Douglas Henderson (SNP politician) =

Scottish politician

Depute Leader of the Scottish National Party
- In office 1979–1981
- Leader: Gordon Wilson
- Preceded by: Margo MacDonald
- Succeeded by: Jim Fairlie
- In office 1971–1973
- Leader: William Wolfe
- Preceded by: George Leslie
- Succeeded by: Gordon Wilson

Member of Parliament for East Aberdeenshire
- In office 28 February 1974 – 7 April 1979
- Preceded by: Patrick Wolrige-Gordon
- Succeeded by: Albert McQuarrie

Personal details
- Born: 16 July 1935 Edinburgh, Scotland
- Died: 15 September 2006 (aged 71) Edinburgh, Scotland
- Party: Scottish National Party
- Spouse: Maureen Ferguson (m. 1960; div. 1982)
- Children: 4
- Education: University of Edinburgh
- Occupation: Management consultant

Douglas Henderson (16 July 1935 – 15 September 2006) was a Scottish politician. He was Depute Leader of the Scottish National Party (SNP) from 1971 to 1973 and from 1979 to 1981. He served as a Scottish National Party Member of Parliament (MP) for East Aberdeenshire from 1974 to 1979, and held virtually every national office in the SNP, short of party leader. His political style has been described as "no-nonsense" and "very blunt and forthright". He was also known for his forceful public speaking, which former SNP leader Alex Salmond described as "messianic".

== Early life and career ==
Henderson was born in Edinburgh, the son of a railway porter. He won a scholarship to attend the Royal High School and was then awarded a bursary which allowed him to attend the University of Edinburgh from 1952 to 1957. He graduated from Edinburgh with an MA and an LLB.

He worked as a management consultant in the UK and overseas. He married Maureen Ferguson in Johannesburg in 1960 and had four children, but they were later divorced. In later life, his home and business partner was English fashion designer Betty Davies; together, they founded Scottish Fashion International.

In later years, he regularly attended St Giles Cathedral, where his funeral was held on 7 October 2006.

== Political career ==
=== Early career (1970–1983) ===
Henderson became a supporter of Scottish independence at an early age, and joined the SNP aged 14. He was President of the Edinburgh University Nationalist Club. Henderson became heavily involved with the SNP after he returned to Scotland from South Africa in the mid-1960s. He was also the director of programmes for Radio Free Scotland from 1963 to 1965, and was Senior vice-chairman (depute leader) of the SNP from 1970 to 1972,. He was selected as the SNP candidate for East Aberdeenshire in 1972, and moved to live in the constituency, developing links with local fishermen, farmers and businessmen. He was elected at the February 1974 general election, and re-elected in the October general election later that year. The SNP were in the ascendent, campaigning on the basis of "It's Scotland's oil".

Henderson served as the whip and was a leading member of the group of 11 SNP MPs in the House of Commons. In 1975, he negotiated a position for the SNP's Winnie Ewing in the British delegation to the European Parliament, where she became known as "Madame Ecosse". He was later the SNP spokesman on employment and industry. He was instrumental in the SNP's decision to lay down a censure motion in the House of Commons, criticising the Labour government of James Callaghan after 1 March 1979 referendum vote on Scottish devolution failed to be approved by the required 40% of the electorate. At the time, the Labour government were reliant upon support from the SNP. The motion was carried by one vote on 28 March and Callaghan immediately called the general election which brought the Conservative Party led by Margaret Thatcher to power. Callaghan described the actions of the SNP as "turkeys voting for Christmas". Henderson lost his seat to Conservative Albert McQuarrie in the 1979 general election by less than 600 votes, and only two MPs from the SNP remained in the new Parliament.

He returned to his business career, but with less success than the 1960s. At the SNP Conference in 1979, he was elected the party's Senior vice-chairman (now described as deputy leader) (to leader Gordon Wilson), defeating Margo MacDonald for the post. He remained in this position until 1981, when he stood down on health grounds.

He fought the new seat of Banff and Buchan, which had largely replaced Aberdeenshire East in the 1983 general election. He again lost to Albert McQuarrie by less than 1,000 votes. The 1983 election saw the SNP only win the two seats that they had held in 1979, but Banff and Buchan was one of three that they came close to recapturing from the Conservatives. Future SNP leader Alex Salmond would win this constituency from 1987, and it would remain in SNP hands until 2017. Henderson also suffered in his private life, being divorced in the early 1980s.

=== Later revival (1998–2006) ===
He was out of active politics for a long period as a result of misdiagnosed illness. He had a major operation in 1998 for cancer, and then several months of chemotherapy, before he was able to resume his political duties for the SNP.

He contested the 2004 European Parliament election for the SNP but was not elected as he was placed fourth on the party's list and they gained only two seats. He also contested the Dumfries and Galloway seat at the 2005 general election, finishing third behind Russell Brown, the Labour candidate and Peter Duncan the Conservative candidate.

In September 2005, following the retirement of Winnie Ewing, he stood for the post of SNP President, losing to Ian Hudghton, Member of the European Parliament, but finishing ahead of onetime president William Wolfe. He was however successful in being elected as one of six ordinary members of the SNP's National Executive Committee.

He was selected to fight the Falkirk East constituency for the 2007 Scottish Parliament election, and was ranked fourth on the SNP's Central Scotland regional list. He died after a short illness in 2006, before the election could take place.

Parliament of the United Kingdom
Preceded by Patrick Wolrige-Gordon	Member for East Aberdeenshire; February 1974 – 1979	Succeeded by Albert McQuarrie
Party political offices
Preceded by John Gair	Scottish National Party Vice Chairman (Policy); 1968–1970	Succeeded by Gordon Murray
Preceded by George Leslie	Senior vice-chairman (Depute Leader) of the Scottish National Party; 1971–73	Succeeded by Gordon Wilson
Preceded by Margo MacDonald	Senior vice-chairman (Depute Leader) of the Scottish National Party; 1979–81	Succeeded by Jim Fairlie
