= Michael Grieve =

Scottish journalist and political activist (1932–1995)

- Born: James Michael Trevlyn Grieve; 28 July 1932; Shetland, United Kingdom
- Died: 18 August 1995 (aged 63); United Kingdom
- Occupations: Journalist, political activist

James Michael Trevlyn Grieve (28 July 1932 – 18 August 1995) was a Scottish journalist and political activist.

Born in Shetland, the son of poet Hugh MacDiarmid, Grieve became a journalist, working across print and television. He first came to attention when he was imprisoned for refusing to do National Service on the grounds that he was a Scottish nationalist.

Grieve became a journalist, working for the Daily Express and writing the "Voice of Scotland" column for the Glasgow Herald, and later also serving as Arts Editor for Scottish Television . He edited some of his father's work, including a complete anthology of his work, and also worked on a biography of MacDiarmid.

Grieve followed his father into nationalist politics, joining the Scottish National Party (SNP), for which he was elected as Vice Chairman with responsibility for publicity in 1969, serving alongside Hugh MacDonald. Grieve's particular focus was to campaign, but the division of labour among the party strategists at that time did not work well, with Douglas Crawford also involved as Director of Communications, and Grieve resigned in 1972. Grieve also stood unsuccessfully for the party in Glasgow Govan at the 1970 general election, and in Rutherglen in 1979.

For the last ten years of his life, Grieve underwent treatment for the throat cancer which ultimately led to his death in 1995.

Party political offices
Preceded by James Braid	Scottish National Party Vice Chairman (Publicity); 1969–1972 with Hugh MacDonald	Succeeded by Isobel Lindsay
