= Jim Fairlie (politician, born 1940) =

Scottish politician

Personal details
- Born: 1940 (age 85–86) Scotland
- Party: Sovereignty (since 2021); Scottish National Party (1955–1990)
- Other political affiliations: Free Scotland (2000s)

Jim Fairlie (born 1940) is a Scottish politician and financial analyst. He was previously a member of the Scottish National Party (SNP), now Sovereignty.

Fairlie was married to Catherine (Sweeney) in September 1961, until her death on 25 May 2020. They had five children; Sharon(b 1962), Andrew (b 1963, deceased 2019),Philip (b 1965),Jim(b 1968) and Katrina (b 1969, deceased 2026).

== Background ==
Fairlie was educated at the University of Dundee. He joined the Scottish National Party (SNP) in 1955, and was elected to its National Executive in the early 1970s. At the February and October 1974, and 1979 general elections, he stood unsuccessfully for the party in Dundee West. At the time he was described as a student teacher and had previously been vice-chair of the Perth and East Perthshire SNP Association. In 1979, he became Vice Chairman for Policy, and from 1981 to 1984, he was Deputy Leader and Senior Vice Chairman of the party. He stood unsuccessfully in Dunfermline West at the 1983 general election and Perth and Kinross in 1987, and also wrote a column in the Scots Independent newspaper.

In 1989 Fairlie was selected to stand again in Perth and Kinross, but he resigned from the SNP in 1990, objecting to its "Independence in Europe" slogan and support for the European Community. In the 2000s, he joined the Free Scotland Party, acting as its Media Liaison Officer. He stood unsuccessfully for the party in Perth at the 2007 Scottish Parliament election.

His son, also named Jim, was elected as an MSP at the 2021 Scottish Parliament election; another son Andrew who died in 2019 was one of the UK's leading chefs.

On 3 August 2021, The Herald announced that Fairlie had joined Restore Scotland (now Sovereignty).

Party political offices
Preceded by Isobel Lindsay	Scottish National Party Vice Chairman (Policy); 1979–1981	Succeeded by Jim Sillars
Preceded by Douglas Henderson	Senior Vice Chairman (Depute Leader) of the Scottish National Party; 1981–1984	Succeeded by Margaret Ewing
