= Harry Rankin (Scottish politician) =

Scottish accountant and politician (1932–2010)

Treasurer of the Scottish National Party
- In office 1965–1966
- Preceded by: David Rollo
- Succeeded by: James Cook

Personal details
- Born: Henry Cunison Deans Rankin; 14 October 1932 Hamilton, Scotland
- Died: 4 January 2010 (aged 77) Dunfermline, Scotland
- Party: Scottish National Party
- Spouse: Edith Rankin (m. 1961)
- Children: 4
- Education: University of Glasgow
- Occupation: Chartered accountant, lecturer, author

Henry Cunison Deans Rankin (14 October 1932 – 4 January 2010), known professionally as Harry Rankin and to family as Cunnie, was a Scottish chartered accountant and political figure who served as treasurer of the Scottish National Party (SNP) and as National Chairman of the Saltire Society.

== Early life and education ==
Rankin was born at Hamilton, Scotland, on 14 October 1932. He was educated at the former Hamilton Academy and the University of Glasgow, graduating MA and LLB in 1958.

== Career ==
In 1967, Rankin joined the tax department of the Glasgow firm of Arthur Young McLelland Moores and Company. He moved in 1970 to the Edinburgh firm of chartered accountants Graham Smart and Annan, where he became tax manager. In 1973 he was appointed a lecturer on taxation at the Institute of Chartered Accountants of Scotland (ICAS), and in 1982 he became the Institute's director of student education. Rankin also wrote Corporation Tax for Students, a textbook used by accountancy students across the United Kingdom.

== Political career ==
Rankin served as SNP national treasurer from 1965 to 1966 and as a member of the party's National Executive Committee from 1966 to 1968.

He stood three times as an SNP parliamentary candidate. At the 1966 general election and the 1970 general election he contested the Lanark constituency, taking 10% and then 12% of the vote respectively. At the February 1974 general election he stood for North Angus and Mearns, improving his share to 23% but again failing to win the seat.

Rankin remained active in the SNP and was included in a list of potential candidates for the 1999 Scottish Parliament election, although he did not ultimately stand. In July 2009, First Minister Alex Salmond appointed Rankin as one of three trustees of a trust fund—financed by Salmond's MSP salary—established to assist community and youth organisations in North-East Scotland.

== Saltire Society and cultural life ==
In June 2007, Rankin was appointed National Chairman of the Saltire Society, succeeding Ian Scott. He was an advocate of devolving broadcasting policy from Westminster to the Scottish Parliament.

For eleven years from its inception, Rankin served as treasurer and secretary of the Cantilena Music Festival, held twice a year on the Isle of Islay.

== Personal life ==
Rankin married Edith in 1961 at the British Consulate in Paris; they had four daughters. He died at Dunfermline on 4 January 2010 and was survived by his wife and daughters.

Party political offices
Preceded by David Rollo	Treasurer of the Scottish National Party; 1965–1966	Succeeded by James Cook
