= George Leslie (politician) =

Scottish politician (1936–2023)

Depute Leader of the Scottish National Party
- In office 1969–1971
- Leader: William Wolfe
- Preceded by: William Wolfe
- Succeeded by: Douglas Henderson

Personal details
- Born: 21 November 1936 Glasgow, Scotland
- Died: 14 June 2023 (aged 86)
- Party: SNP
- Education: University of Glasgow
- Profession: Veterinary surgeon

George Andrew Leslie (21 November 1936 – 14 June 2023) was a Scottish politician and veterinary surgeon. He was the Scottish National Party (SNP)'s Senior Vice-Chairman from 1969 to 1971.

== Early life ==
Leslie was born in Glasgow, Scotland. He studied at Hillhead High School and Glasgow University before becoming a vet.

== Political career ==
Leslie joined the Scottish National Party (SNP) in the early-1960s. He was selected to stand for the party at the 1967 Glasgow Pollok by-election. During the by-election, one observer described his speeches as being in the style of Jimmy Maxton. His campaign also featured the singing of both traditional and topical Scottish songs. Although the party had never previously contested the seat, Leslie took 28% of the vote. The Labour Party share of the vote dropped considerably, enabling the Conservative Party to win – their last by-election win of the twentieth century in Scotland. Leslie's campaign marked the start of a year of successes for the SNP, including becoming the largest party in local government in Stirling, and victory in the Hamilton by-election.

Leslie was soon elected to the Glasgow Corporation, and, in June 1969, became the SNP's Senior Vice-Chairman. Later, he served as a Strathclyde Regional councillor for East Kilbride, and he stood as the SNP candidate for Glasgow at the European Parliament election in 1979, taking 16.4% of the vote.

During the early-1980s, Leslie was the SNP's vice-chairman for policy. He was the party's candidate in the high-profile Glasgow Hillhead by-election in 1982 but, despite campaigning hard, he finished in fourth place, with 11.3% of the votes cast. He stood again in the Hillhead constituency at the 1983 general election, but only received 5.4% of the vote, He stood in Strathclyde East at the 1984 European election, taking second place with 17.6% of the vote, then in Kilmarnock and Loudoun in the 1987 general election, taking third place but with 18.2% of the vote. Standing again in Strathclyde East at the 1989 European election, he increased his share to 25.2%, and finally at the 1992 general election he took 15.6% and fourth place in Glasgow Pollok.

On 28 February 2010, Leslie formally launched a campaign to contest Kilmarnock and Loudoun at the 2010 general election. However, he finished in second place, 12,378 votes behind the Labour Party candidate Cathy Jamieson.

Leslie returned to his home on 13 June 2023 after a prolonged stay at University Hospital Crosshouse. He died the following day, at the age of 86.

Party political offices
Preceded by John Gair	Scottish National Party Vice Chairman (Policy); 1968–1969	Succeeded by Gordon Murray
Preceded by William Wolfe	Senior Vice Chairman (Depute Leader) of the Scottish National Party; 1969–1971	Succeeded by Douglas Henderson
Preceded by Jim Sillars	Scottish National Party Vice Chairman (Policy); 1983–1985	Succeeded by ?
