= Radio Free Scotland =

Scottish radio station

Between 1956 and 1965 Radio Free Scotland (RFS) broadcast through the audio channel of BBC television (then on VHF) after God Save the Queen finished in the evening, and, later on, on 262 metres medium wave on the radio.

The station was the initiative of David Rollo, an electrical engineer who served as the Scottish National Party (SNP)'s treasurer and head of broadcasting. He built a transmitter in the Townhead Cafe in Kirkintilloch with Alvaro Rossi.

The first broadcast interrupted a BBC newscast when viewers in Perth were told to stay tuned following sign off. This "pirate" radio transmission opened with the provocative statement: "This is Radio Free Scotland proclaiming to the nation that the fight for independence is on in earnest". This roving station was heard for almost a month in Glasgow, Ayrshire and Perth.

Leading figures in Radio Free Scotland included "Controller General", Gordon Wilson, who later became an MP (1974–1987) and was Chairman (Convener) of the SNP from 1979 to 1990. Douglas Henderson, also later an MP, was "Director of Programmes" between 1963 and 1965. Scotland's oldest woman when she died, Annie Knight, hosted the station in her living room during 1962.

Gordon Wilson has written a book about the station, Pirates of the Air.

Radio Free Scotland was reborn online in 2007 after the blessing of William Wolfe and others from the original station was given to Presenter "Pax". The station was presented for the first run by Pax himself with occasional guests providing music and opinion relevant to Scottish independence. Every show still starts with opening words from the original broadcasts.

In 2013 the show was revamped again to include regular guests Nick Durie and Gordon S. Kerman giving their own views and insights along Yes Scotland Edinburgh Pentlands co-ordinator Simon Hayter giving monthly updates both nationally and regionally for the Yes Scotland campaign.
