= Colin Bell (journalist) =

Scottish journalist (1938–2021)

Colin J. Bell (1 April 1938 – 9 October 2021) was a Scottish journalist, broadcaster and author.

Bell was educated at St Paul's School, London, and King's College, Cambridge, where he graduated in 1959 with a first-class degree in the Historical Tripos. He went on to become a journalist with various newspapers, including The Scotsman, and was once editor of The Scots Independent. He made the transition to broadcasting with BBC Radio Scotland in 1984.

Bell served the Scottish National Party (SNP) as Executive Vice-chairman from 1978 to 1984, and was the party's Campaign Director for the European Parliament elections in 1984. In 1979 he stood as SNP Parliamentary Candidate for Edinburgh West, and also as the European Parliamentary Candidate for North East Scotland that same year. In June 1996, he was the 13th Scot to be presented with the Oliver Brown Award. He later left the SNP to join the Scottish Socialist Party.

Bell wrote Murder Trail: Death for a Living. He served as Rector of Aberdeen University from 1991 to 1993.

Bell died on 9 October 2021, at the age of 83.

== Footnotes ==
Party political offices
Preceded by Stephen Maxwell	Scottish National Party Vice Chairman (Publicity); 1979?–1981?	Succeeded by Isobel Lindsay
Preceded by Isobel Lindsay	Scottish National Party Vice Chairman (Publicity); 1984–1985	Succeeded by Alex Salmond
Academic offices
Preceded by Willis Pickard	Rector of the University of Aberdeen; 1991–1993	Succeeded by Ian Hamilton
