= David Alexander (Scottish politician) =

British politician (born 1958)

Leader of Falkirk Council
- In office February 2001 – May 2007
- Monarch: Elizabeth II

Personal details
- Born: June 20, 1958 (age 68)

David Alexander (born 20 June 1958) is a former leader of Falkirk Council from February 2001 to May 2007 and led the SNP Group on the council for twenty years. He is one of two SNP councillors for Falkirk North Ward. He is a non-executive board member of the Scottish Ambulance Service.

== Political career ==
=== Falkirk Council ===
Before entering politics, he worked as a support worker with a housing association. He was first elected as councillor in 1988 for the Victoria ward, then elected as a councillor for the former Middlefield Ward in 1999, then the North Ward.

In 2000 he was the best value spokesman for the Convention of Scottish Local Authorities (COSLA). After gaining a seat in a by-election in February 2001, the SNP formed a new administration with the independents and Alexander became the council leader. Falkirk council then withdrew from COSLA.

=== Other political activity ===
He was the SNP candidate for the Falkirk West seat at the 1997 general election, where he finished as runner-up to Dennis Canavan, winning 8,989 votes (23.43% of votes cast).

In 2004 he was appointed by Alex Salmond as the SNP spokesperson on local government, a role he continued in until the elections in May 2007.

On 1 December 2007 he was elected to the position of the SNP's first ever Convenor of Local Government, winning 110 of the 150 votes cast by party delegates at the SNP's National Council.

== Board roles ==
He served as a member of the Central Scotland Joint Police Board; the Forth Valley Area Waste Strategy Working Group; the NHS Forth Valley Board until resigning in protest at the board's decision to build the new hospital at Larbert using PFI; and the board of Scottish Enterprise Forth Valley.

He was first appointed to the board of the Scottish Ambulance service in 2008.
