= Isobel Lindsay =

Scottish nationalist

Isobel Lindsay (born 1943) is a former sociology lecturer, known as a Scottish nationalist and peace activist.

Born in Hamilton, Lindsay studied at Hamilton Academy and at the University of Glasgow. She later joined Strathclyde University, first as a research fellow and then as a lecturer in sociology. In 1960, she was a signatory to the Committee of 100 anti-war group, and through the group, she met and married Tom McAlpine. Their son is Robin McAlpine.

Lindsay joined the Scottish National Party (SNP) at an early age and first stood for the Westminster parliament (unsuccessfully) in Motherwell at the 1970 general election, and became a member of the party's National Executive the same year. She was first elected as a Vice Chair of the party in 1972, initially with responsibility for publicity, then later served as Vice Chair for policy.

She stood again at the 1978 Berwick and East Lothian by-election. This was controversial, as the Berwick and East Lothian branch of the SNP had already selected a candidate for the next general election. Although party rules stated that prospective parliamentary candidates were suspended at by-elections, he initially refused to stand aside, and Lindsay only agreed reluctantly to stand, amid several resignations from the local branch. Lindsay took only 8.8 per cent of the vote and lost her deposit.

Although strongly associated with the left wing of the SNP, Lindsay did not join the 79 Group. She remained on the SNP's executive until 1989, when she resigned from the party, as the sole executive member to support the party participating in the Scottish Constitutional Convention. She became the final convenor of the Campaign for a Scottish Assembly before this ambition was achieved. In 1994, she joined the Labour Party, and attempted to stand for the party at the 1999 Scottish Parliament election, but she was not approved by the party leadership.

Active in the Campaign for Nuclear Disarmament (CND) from her youth, Lindsay served as its vice-chair in the 2000s, also on the board of Scottish Left Review, while being prominent in the National Collective.

Party political offices
Preceded by Michael Grieve and Hugh MacDonald	Scottish National Party Vice Chair (Publicity); 1972–1974	Succeeded by Douglas Crawford
Preceded by Arthur Donaldson	Scottish National Party Vice Chair (Policy); 1975–1979	Succeeded by Jim Fairlie
Preceded by Colin Bell	Scottish National Party Vice Chair (Publicity); 1981–1984	Succeeded by Colin Bell
