= Gordon Murray (politician) =

Gordon Stewart Murray (1927 – 1 February 2015) was a Scottish nationalist politician.

== Education ==
Gordon Murray studied at Aberdeen Grammar School before becoming a civil engineer and also maintaining a croft. He joined the Scottish National Party at the age of 15, and was elected to Dumbarton County Council in 1967. He subsequently served on Cumbernauld Burgh Council, Cumbernauld and Kilsyth District Council, Strathclyde Regional Council and, lastly, North Lanarkshire Council. For much of this time, he served as Provost of Cumbernauld.

== Career ==
He stood in East Dunbartonshire at the 1970 general election, taking 11% of the vote, then in East Kilbride in October 1974, where he came a close second with 37%. He stood again in 1979, then in Cumbernauld and Kilsyth in 1983, but never won a seat.

In 2003, Murray left the SNP group on the council, along with his wife, Margaret, in protest at Andrew Wilson being placed well down the party's list for Central Scotland, and their belief that the SNP group on the council paid insufficient attention to Cumbernauld. They subsequently formed the Cumbernauld Independent Councillors Association, which he represented until 2012, when he retired due to ill health.

Party political offices
Preceded by Douglas Henderson	Scottish National Party Vice Chairman (Policy); 1970–1972	Succeeded by Margo MacDonald
Preceded by Janette Jones?	Scottish National Party Vice Chairman (Local Government); 1983–1985	Succeeded by Kenny MacAskill
