= David Rollo (politician) =

Scottish nationalist political activist

David Rollo (July 1919 – 18 September 2006) was a Scottish nationalist political activist.

Born in Springburn, North Glasgow, Rollo studied at Lenzie Academy and played for Lenzie Rugby Club. During World War II, he joined the Royal Electrical and Mechanical Engineers attached to the 6th Airborne Division, and rose to become a sergeant. They reached Wismar, which fell on 1 May 1945. In 1947, he gained admittance to the University of Glasgow to study electrical engineering and, although his time was interrupted by a year recuperating from tuberculosis, he eventually graduated BSc and spent the remainder of his career in the industry.

Rollo joined the Scottish National Party (SNP) and was elected as its treasurer in 1953/4, serving until 1967. This was a difficult time for the party's finances, and he often used his personal funds to pay the office secretary.

Believing that the BBC was biased against Scottish nationalism, Rollo used his electrical engineering experience worked with Alvaro Rossi to build a radio transmitter which broadcast sound on the BBC Television frequency. In 1956, they used this to launch "Radio Free Scotland", based in Rollo's home town of Kirkintilloch. It broadcast a mix of political comedy and patriotic music after the BBC finished at 11 p.m. Rollo stood for the party at the 1959 general election in Hamilton, by which time he was head of the SNP's broadcasting committee. After the SNP was not given the opportunity to make an election broadcast, he used the radio station to make party political broadcasts to Hamilton, He stood but his campaign was ultimately unsuccessful, taking only 6.2% of the vote. The radio was considered a success, and he built a similar transmitter for Plaid Cymru to use for "Radio Free Wales".

Rollo stood again for the SNP in Glasgow Woodside at the 1970 general election, taking 8.4% of the vote, then in Paisley at the February, October 1974 general elections, achieving 21% and then 33% of the vote, although he was not elected. He stood a final time in 1979, but his vote share fell to 15.7%.

Rollo remained active in the SNP, and in 2004 published Lockerbie: a bum rap?, exploring questions around the Lockerbie disaster.

Party political offices
Preceded by ?	Treasurer of the Scottish National Party; 1953–1965	Succeeded by Harry Rankin
