= Galloway and Upper Nithsdale =

Galloway and Upper Nithsdale may refer to:

- Galloway and Upper Nithsdale (UK Parliament constituency)
- Galloway and Upper Nithsdale (Scottish Parliament constituency)
