= Gloag =

Gloag is a surname, and may refer to:

- Ann Gloag (born 1942), Scottish businesswoman and charity campaigner
- Helen Gloag (1750–1790), of Perthshire, Scotland became the Empress of Morocco
- Helena Gloag (1909–1973), Scottish actress
- Isobel Lilian Gloag (1865–1917), English painter
- John Gloag (1896–1981), English novelist and nonfiction writer
- Joseph Gloag (ca. 1906–1977), Scottish marketing theorist and political activist
- Julian Gloag (born 1930), English novelist and screenwriter
- Paton James Gloag (1823–1906), Scottish minister and theological author
- Robin Gloag (1943–2007), co-founder of Stagecoach Group
- Thomas Gloag (born 2001), English cyclist
- William Gloag (lawyer) (1865–1934), Scottish lawyer and academic
- William Gloag, Lord Kincairney (1828–1909), Scottish judge
