= Carsehall =

Village in Perth and Kinross, Scotland

Coordinates: 56.222072°N 3.351386°W

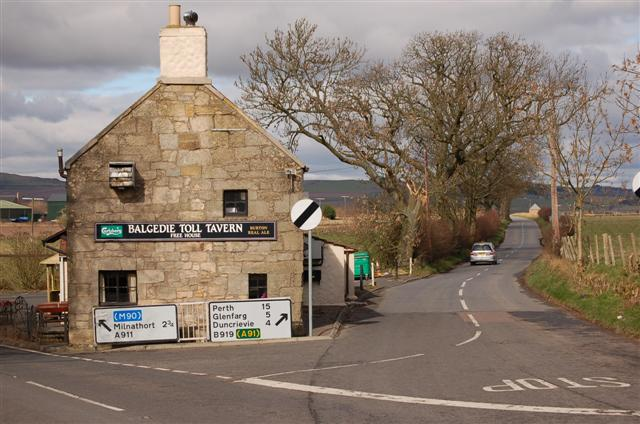
- The Balgedie Toll Tavern at Carsehall

- Location within Perth and Kinross
- OS grid reference: NO163041
- Council area: Perth and Kinross
- Lieutenancy area: Perth and Kinross
- Country: Scotland
- Sovereign state: United Kingdom
- Post town: KINROSS
- Postcode district: KY13
- Dialling code: 01577
- Police: Scotland
- Fire: Scottish
- Ambulance: Scottish
- UK Parliament: Perth and Kinross-shire
- Scottish Parliament: Ochil

Carsehall is a village in Perth and Kinross, Scotland. It is northeast of Loch Leven and west of Bishop Hill in the Lomond Hills. It is on the A911 road at its junction with the B919 road. It is approximately 5 miles (8 kilometres) west of Glenrothes and 3 miles (5 kilometres) east of Kinross. It is the location of the Balgedie Toll Tavern.
