= George Reid (Scottish politician) =

Scottish politician (1939–2025)

The Right Honourable Sir George Reid KT FRSE
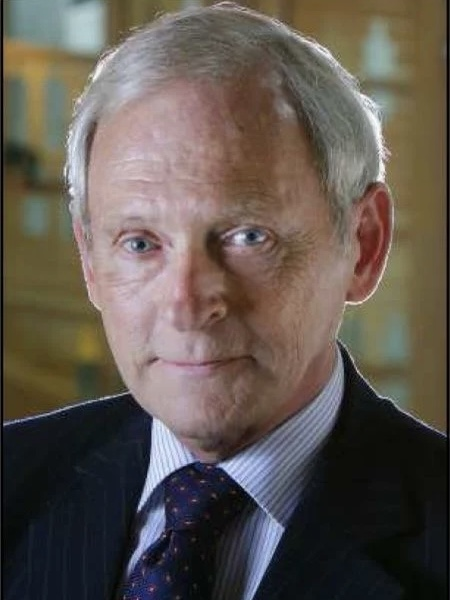
- Official portrait, 2003

Presiding Officer of the Scottish Parliament
- In office 7 May 2003 – 14 May 2007
- Monarch: Elizabeth II
- Deputy: Murray Tosh; Trish Godman
- Preceded by: David Steel
- Succeeded by: Alex Fergusson

Deputy Presiding Officer of the Scottish Parliament
- In office 12 May 1999 – 7 May 2003 Serving with Patricia Ferguson (1999–2001) and Murray Tosh (2001–2003)
- Presiding Officer: David Steel
- Preceded by: Office established
- Succeeded by: Trish Godman
Parliamentary offices
Member of the Scottish Parliament for Ochil
In office 3 May 2003 – 2 April 2007
| Preceded by | Richard Simpson |
| Succeeded by | Keith Brown |
Member of the Scottish Parliament for Mid Scotland and Fife (1 of 7 Regional MSPs)
In office 1 May 1999 – 31 March 2003
Member of Parliament for Clackmannan and Eastern Stirlingshire
In office 28 February 1974 – 7 April 1979
| Preceded by | Dick Douglas |
| Succeeded by | Martin O'Neill |

Personal details
- Born: George Newlands Reid; 4 June 1939 Tullibody, Clackmannanshire, Scotland
- Died: 12 August 2025 (aged 86) Denny, Falkirk, Scotland
- Party: Scottish National Party
- Education: University of St Andrews; Union College

Sir George Newlands Reid (4 June 1939 – 12 August 2025) was a Scottish politician and journalist who served as Presiding Officer of the Scottish Parliament from 2003 to 2007. A member of the Scottish National Party (SNP), he was a Member of the Scottish Parliament (MSP) for the Mid Scotland and Fife region from 1999 to 2003 and then for the Ochil constituency from 2003 to 2007. Reid was the Member of Parliament (MP) for Clackmannan and Eastern Stirlingshire from February 1974 to 1979.

== Early life ==
Reid was born on 4 June 1939 in Tullibody, near Alloa, Clackmannanshire, the son of George Reid, a company director, and Margaret (née Forsyth). He was educated at Tullibody School and Dollar Academy. Reid attended the University of St Andrews, where he earned an MA with First-class honours in History in 1962. He then continued with further studies in Switzerland and at Union College in the United States, obtaining a diploma in international relations.

== Journalist career ==
Reid worked as a broadcast journalist and television producer for the BBC, Granada Television and Scottish Television, and as a print journalist for several newspapers. In this time he produced over 200 television documentaries, including Emmy winner Contract 736, about the construction of the RMS Queen Elizabeth 2.

After leaving Westminster he briefly returned to journalism. For BBC Scotland, he presented Agenda, which was produced by Kirsty Wark. He was producer of the famous reportage by Michael Buerk of the Ethiopian famine of 1984 that inspired the Band Aid and Live Aid charity campaigns, which led him to be headhunted by the International Red Cross and Red Crescent. He was part of an international disaster team that responded to the 1988 Armenian earthquake. He was Director of Public Affairs of the International Red Cross and Red Crescent for 12 years, based in Geneva, Switzerland, but working worldwide in conflict and disaster zones.

== Political career ==
=== Early political career ===
Reid was elected as the Scottish National Party (SNP) Member of Parliament for Clackmannan and East Stirlingshire in the February 1974 general election, with a majority of 3,610. He more than doubled his majority to 7,341 in the October 1974 general election, but then lost by a narrow 984 votes in the 1979 general election.

During his time at Westminster he served as a member of the Parliamentary Assembly of the Council of Europe and that of the Western European Union.

In 1995 Reid re-entered Scottish politics by delivering the annual Donaldson Lecture at the SNP conference, drawing on his knowledge of continental European politics to argue a case for why a party like the SNP could be expected to prosper if a Scottish Parliament was established. Labour Shadow Secretary of State for Scotland George Robertson's contrary claim that devolution would "kill the SNP stone dead" was dismissed by Reid by saying "Ho, ho, ho".

=== Election to Holyrood ===
He stood in the Ochil constituency, which covered approximately the same area as his old seat, at Westminster in the UK general election 1997, coming in second. When the new Labour administration moved forward with proposals for a Scottish Parliament, Reid first served on the pre-establishment Consultative Steering Group, and then was elected in the first election in 1999 to represent Mid Scotland and Fife.

At the opening of the Parliament Reid was defeated 82 votes to 44 by Sir David Steel for the position of Presiding Officer of the Scottish Parliament and was instead elected a Deputy Presiding Officer.

=== Presiding Officer of the Scottish Parliament (2003–2007) ===
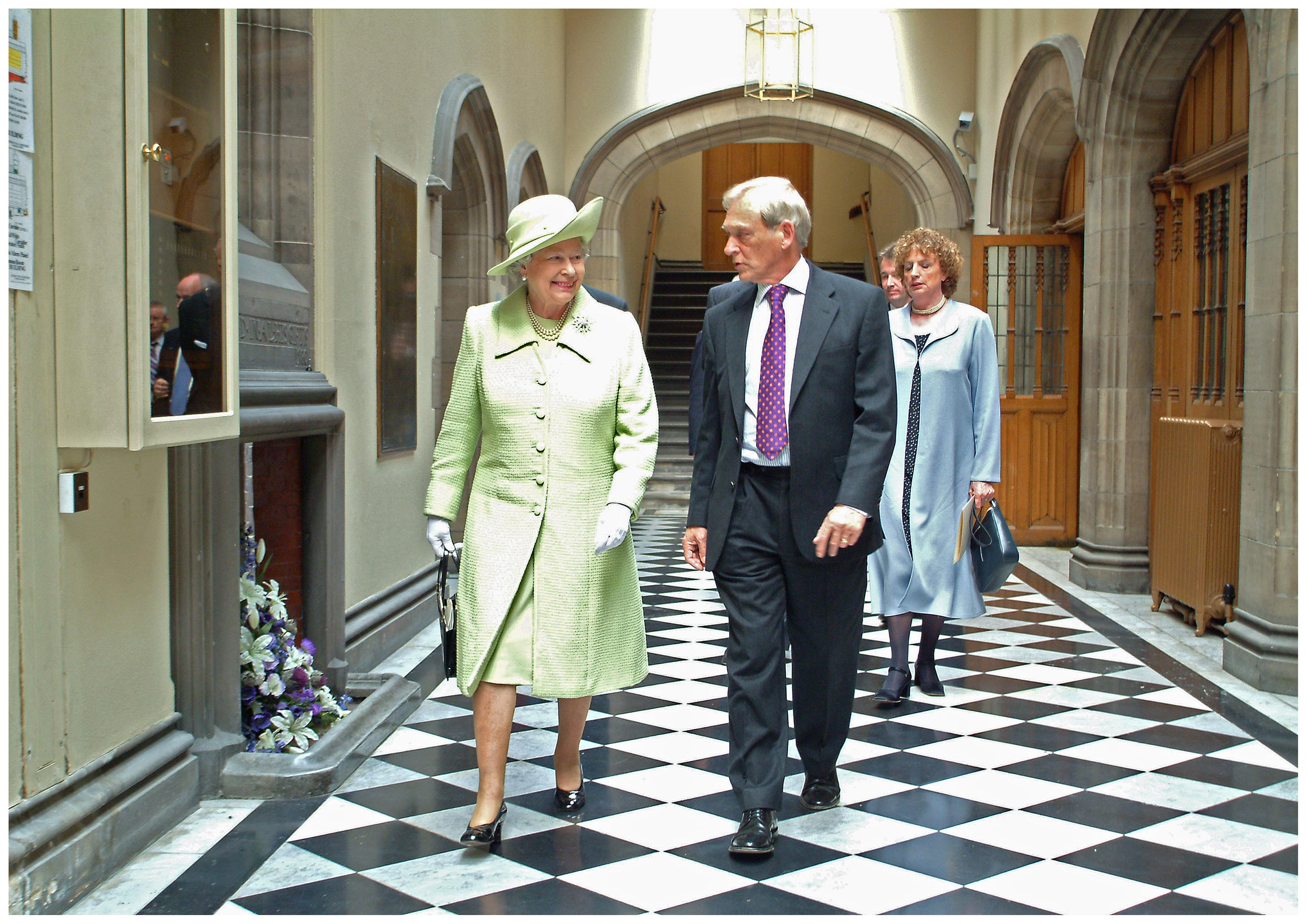
Reid with Elizabeth II at the opening of the 2nd Scottish Parliament, 2003

At the 2003 Scottish Parliament election Reid succeeded in winning the Ochil constituency first past the post. He was then elected by his fellow MSPs to succeed David Steel as Presiding Officer. As the Presiding Officer is expected to be strictly nonpartisan, he voluntarily suspended his SNP membership for the duration of his tenure.

As the Presiding Officer has a role in advising the monarch, Reid was appointed a member of the Privy Council of the United Kingdom in 2004. He oversaw the completion of the new Scottish Parliament building at Holyrood and the move from its temporary site on The Mound to Holyrood in 2004. At the official opening of the new building that year, he made a keynote speech in which he paid tribute to the construction as an architectural achievement, and urged parliamentarians to "listen to the building" to inspire them in their future endeavours.

As Presiding Officer he also led the creation of a Scottish Futures Forum, to promote cross-party strategic thinking. He was appointed President of the Royal Commonwealth Society Scotland, and became Patron of the Scottish Disability Equality Forum. He had his portrait taken by photographer Harry Benson in 2007 to be part of the Scottish Parliament art collection.

== Post–Presiding Officer ==
Reid chose not to seek re-election at the end of the 2007 Parliamentary term. As an independent figure with experience of a devolved parliament, he was chosen to lead a review of the administration of the troubled Northern Ireland Assembly. Reid also joined the European Union's Caucasus-Caspian diplomatic commission. He was nominated to sit on the Commission on Scottish Devolution chaired by Kenneth Calman but despite broad support from within Holyrood this was blocked by the UK Labour party.

Reid was appointed Lord High Commissioner to the General Assembly of the Church of Scotland in January 2008, to serve as Queen Elizabeth II's personal representative to the Church of Scotland. At the time, this position was second only to the Queen and the Duke of Edinburgh in the ceremonial Order of Precedence in Scotland. He was reappointed to the role in 2009.

In 2006 he was appointed by the University of Glasgow as an Honorary Professor in the School of Law. Between 2008 and 2011 he was an independent adviser on the Scottish Ministerial Code.

In September 2009, Reid was appointed by the National Trust for Scotland to lead a wide-ranging internal governance review. Reid produced a report, making a range of recommendations that were accepted by the Trust. In 2011, he was appointed Her Majesty's Lord Lieutenant of Clackmannanshire and remained in this role until 2014.

He was an Electoral Commissioner from 2010 to 2014.

In 2013 he underwent major surgery for bladder cancer. He resigned all his positions, then made a good recovery. In 2016, First Minister Nicola Sturgeon appointed him to the Scottish Government's Standing Council on Europe to provide expert advice.

== Death ==
Reid died from kidney cancer at Strathcarron Hospice, Denny, on 12 August 2025, at the age of 86. Tributes were paid by Alison Johnstone, the current presiding officer of the Scottish Parliament.

== Awards and honours ==
After relief efforts for the 1988 Armenian earthquake Reid was recognised with the Gold Medal of the Supreme Soviet of Armenia and the Pirogov Gold Medal of the USSR.

During his time as Presiding Officer he won the Herald newspaper's Scottish Politician of the Year award in 2003 and 2005, becoming the first person to have won the award on two occasions, followed by a lifetime achievement award in 2013. Reid was made a Free man of Clackmannanshire in 2007.

He received also several honorary doctorates, i.e. an LLD degree from the University of St Andrews in 2005, a DUniv degree from Queen Margaret University in 2006, the degree of Dr.h.c. from the University of Edinburgh in 2007, and a DUniv degree from the University of Stirling in 2008.

Reid was knighted in the 2012 Birthday Honours for services to Scottish politics and public life. In 2015, he was elected a Fellow of the Royal Society of Edinburgh (FRSE). At the Scottish Public Service Awards in 2018, he was recognised for his contribution to public life and given a Lifetime Achievement Award.

On 10 June 2022, Reid was appointed a Knight of the Order of the Thistle (KT) alongside Dame Elish Angiolini. He was installed the following month.

Parliament of the United Kingdom
| Preceded by Dick Douglas | Member of Parliament for Clackmannan and Eastern Stirlingshire; February 1974–1979 | Succeeded by Martin O'Neill |
Scottish Parliament
| Preceded by Richard Simpson | Member of the Scottish Parliament for Ochil; 2003–2007 | Succeeded by Keith Brown |
Political offices
| Preceded by Sir David Steel | Presiding Officer of the Scottish Parliament; 2003–2007 | Succeeded by Alex Fergusson |
Other offices
| Preceded by The Duke of York | Lord High Commissioner to the General Assembly of the Church of Scotland; 2008–2009 | Succeeded by The Lord Wilson of Tillyorn |
