= Fife Central =

Fife Central may mean or refer to:

- Central Fife (UK Parliament constituency)
- Central Fife (Scottish Parliament constituency)
