= Jenny Gilruth =

Deputy First Minister of Scotland since 2026

Jenny Gilruth MSP
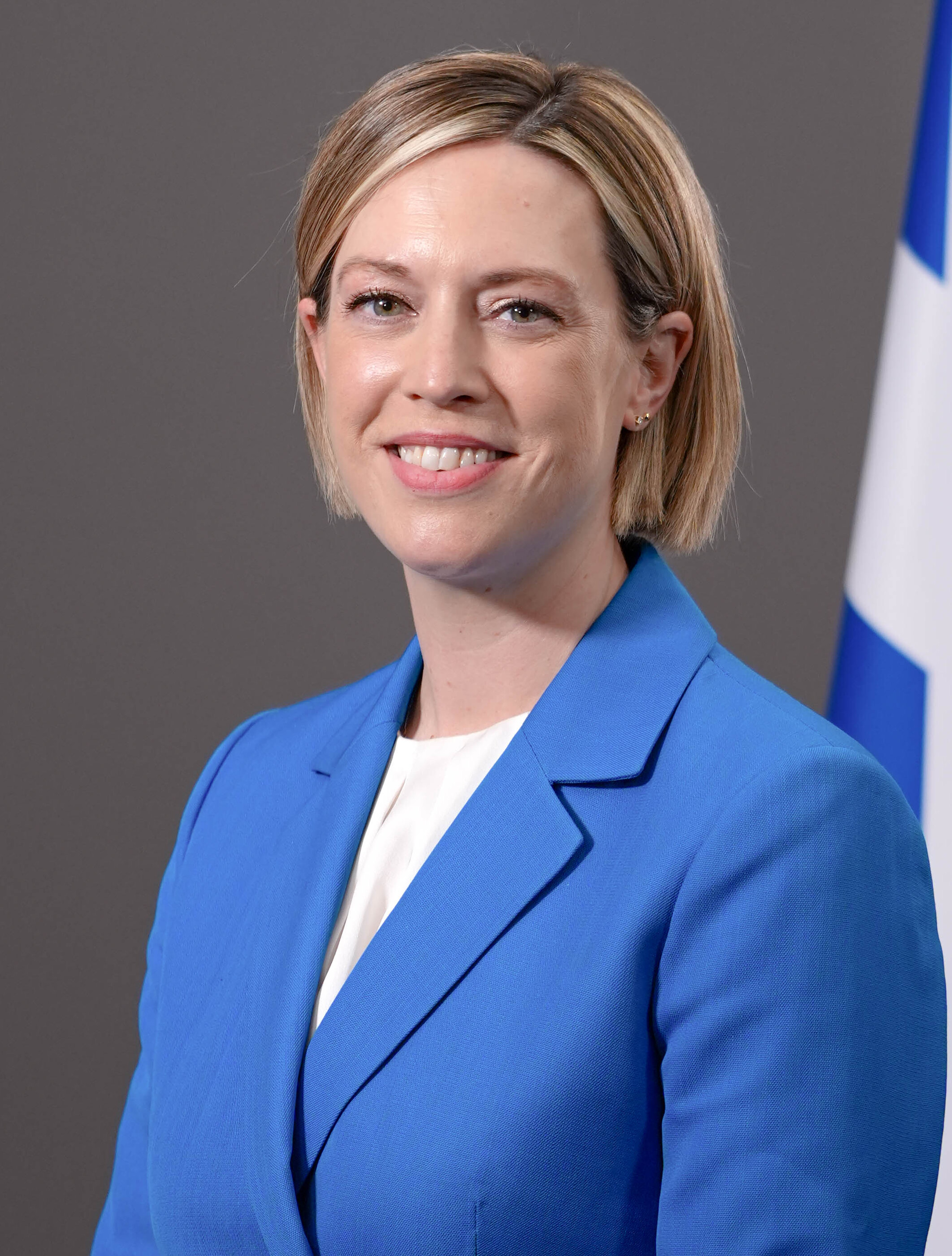
- Official portrait, 2026

Deputy First Minister of Scotland
- Incumbent
- Assumed office 20 May 2026
- First Minister: John Swinney
- Preceded by: Kate Forbes

Cabinet Secretary for Finance and Local Government
- Incumbent
- Assumed office 20 May 2026
- First Minister: John Swinney
- Preceded by: Shona Robison
Cabinet & ministerial offices
Cabinet Secretary for Education and Skills
In office 29 March 2023 – 20 May 2026
First Minister	Humza Yousaf; John Swinney
Preceded by	Shirley-Anne Somerville
Succeeded by	Màiri McAllan (as Education, Culture and Gaelic)
Minister for Transport
In office 24 January 2022 – 29 March 2023
First Minister	Nicola Sturgeon
Preceded by	Graeme Dey
Succeeded by	Kevin Stewart
Minister for Culture, Europe and International Development
In office 17 February 2020 – 24 January 2022
First Minister	Nicola Sturgeon
Preceded by	Ben Macpherson
Succeeded by	Neil Gray

Member of the Scottish Parliament for Mid Fife and Glenrothes
- Incumbent
- Assumed office 5 May 2016
- Preceded by: Tricia Marwick
- Majority: 7,634 (29.7%)

Personal details
- Born: Jennifer Madeleine Gilruth; 1984 (age 41–42) Aberdeen, Scotland
- Party: Scottish National Party
- Spouse: Kezia Dugdale (m. 2022)
- Education: University of Glasgow (MA)
- Website: www.jennygilruthmsp.scot

Jennifer Madeleine Gilruth (born 1984) is a Scottish politician who has served as Deputy First Minister of Scotland and Cabinet Secretary for Finance and Local Government since 2026. A member of the Scottish National Party (SNP), she has been the Member of the Scottish Parliament (MSP) for Mid Fife and Glenrothes since the 2016 Scottish Parliament election.

Gilruth sat on the SNP's backbenches and served successively in the parliament's education, health, justice and social security committees. On 17 February 2020, first minister Nicola Sturgeon appointed her to the Scottish Government as the minister for culture, Europe and international development. She was later reshuffled as the transport minister and oversaw the transition to public ownership of ScotRail. Following Humza Yousaf's appointment as first minister, a campaign Gilruth endorsed, she was subsequently appointed to cabinet as the education secretary. Following the 2026 election, first minister John Swinney appointed Gilruth deputy first minister and cabinet secretary for finance and local government.

== Early life and career ==
Gilruth was first raised in Banff, Aberdeenshire, before her family moved to Ceres, Fife. Her father was born and raised in Newport-on-Tay. She was educated at Madras College (St Andrews, Fife). She graduated from the University of Glasgow with a degree in sociology and politics, and obtained her Professional Graduate Diploma in Education from the University of Strathclyde.

Before becoming an MSP, Gilruth was a Principal Teacher of Social Subjects at St. Columba's Roman Catholic High School, Dunfermline, she was previously a National Qualifications Development Officer at Education Scotland, and prior to that taught Modern Studies at the Royal High School, in Edinburgh. Gilruth also marked exams for the Scottish Qualifications Authority and is a published author.

== Member of Scottish Parliament (2016–present) ==
In April 2016, Gilruth was nominated as the SNP's candidate for Mid Fife and Glenrothes in the Scottish Parliament election on 5 May 2016. She won the seat with 15,555 votes (54.9% of the vote), with a majority of 8,236; more than double the votes cast for second-place candidate Kay Morrison of Scottish Labour. She succeeded Tricia Marwick, who had been the Presiding Officer in the 4th Scottish Parliament (2011–16).

== Early ministerial roles (2020–2023) ==
In February 2020, Gilruth joined the Scottish Government as Minister for Europe, Migration and International Development as part of the reshuffle following the resignation of Cabinet Secretary for Finance Derek Mackay.

In a ministerial reshuffle on 24 January 2022, Gilruth was appointed as Minister for Transport, following the resignation of Graeme Dey. She said: "The transport portfolio is an exciting opportunity to not just shape the infrastructure of our country but to also help Scotland become a world leader in achieving our goal to become net zero by 2045." As Transport Minister, she was involved in managing issues related to ScotRail train services and a dispute with ASLEF, as well as responsibilities relating to the provision of Scottish ferries. In June 2022, she responded to questions in the Scottish Parliament about her accountability and responsibility in resolving the ScotRail/ASLEF pay dispute.

== Education Secretary (2023–2026) ==
On 29 March 2023, newly appointed First Minister Humza Yousaf promoted Gilruth to the Scottish Cabinet as the Cabinet Secretary for Education and Skills, succeeding Shirley-Anne Somerville. Following Yousaf's resignation as First Minister and Leader of the Scottish National Party in May 2024, Gilruth retained the post of Cabinet Secretary for Education in the Swinney government.

=== School–based violence ===
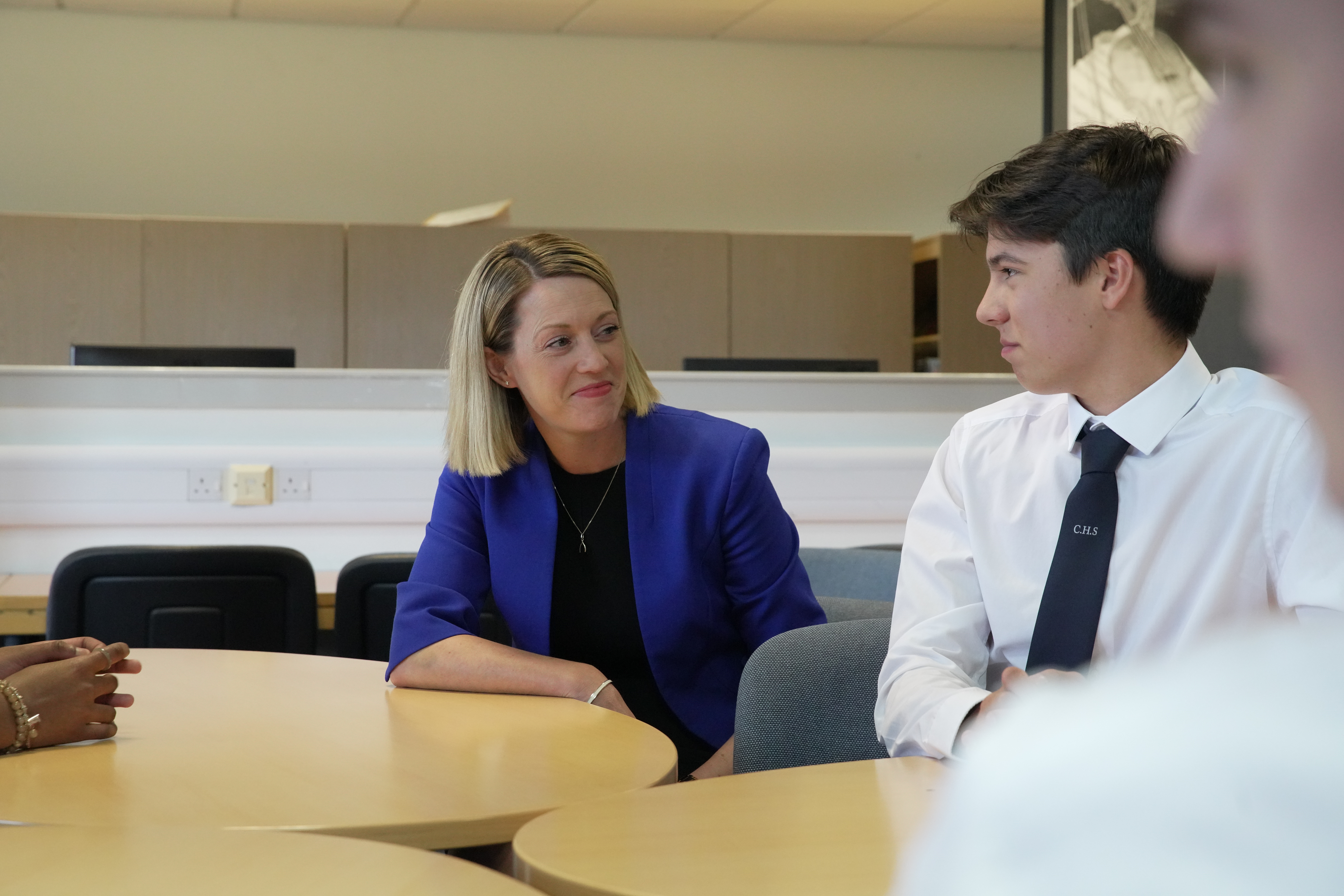
Gilruth at Craigmount High School on Exam Results Day, 2023

Gilruth came under criticism in February 2024 as it became to light that she had not read a report into violence in schools in the Aberdeen City Council area. Scotland's largest union representing teachers, the Educational Institute of Scotland (EIS) claimed that they found it "very difficult to understand why the cabinet secretary would not have read the Aberdeen report or at least have been briefed on it". Addressing the comments made by an EIS spokesperson, Gilruth said that the report would "be for Aberdeen City Council to respond to", and also highlighted her awareness around the "challenges on this matter". Gilruth highlighted the work that was underway within the Scottish Parliament at that point in order to draft a plan which would see the Scottish Government and Scotland's local authorities working together to the combat violence in Scottish schools.

In August 2024, as education secretary, Gilruth launched the Scottish Behaviour Plan on behalf of the Scottish Government which advocates for "high warmth and high standards" in Scottish schools. Additionally, the plan indicated that a "culture shift" had been a major cause for leaving teachers feeling "disempowered". The plan widely backed a relationship approach across Scotland's schools, and did not advocate for pupils being excluded as a consequence for their behaviour.

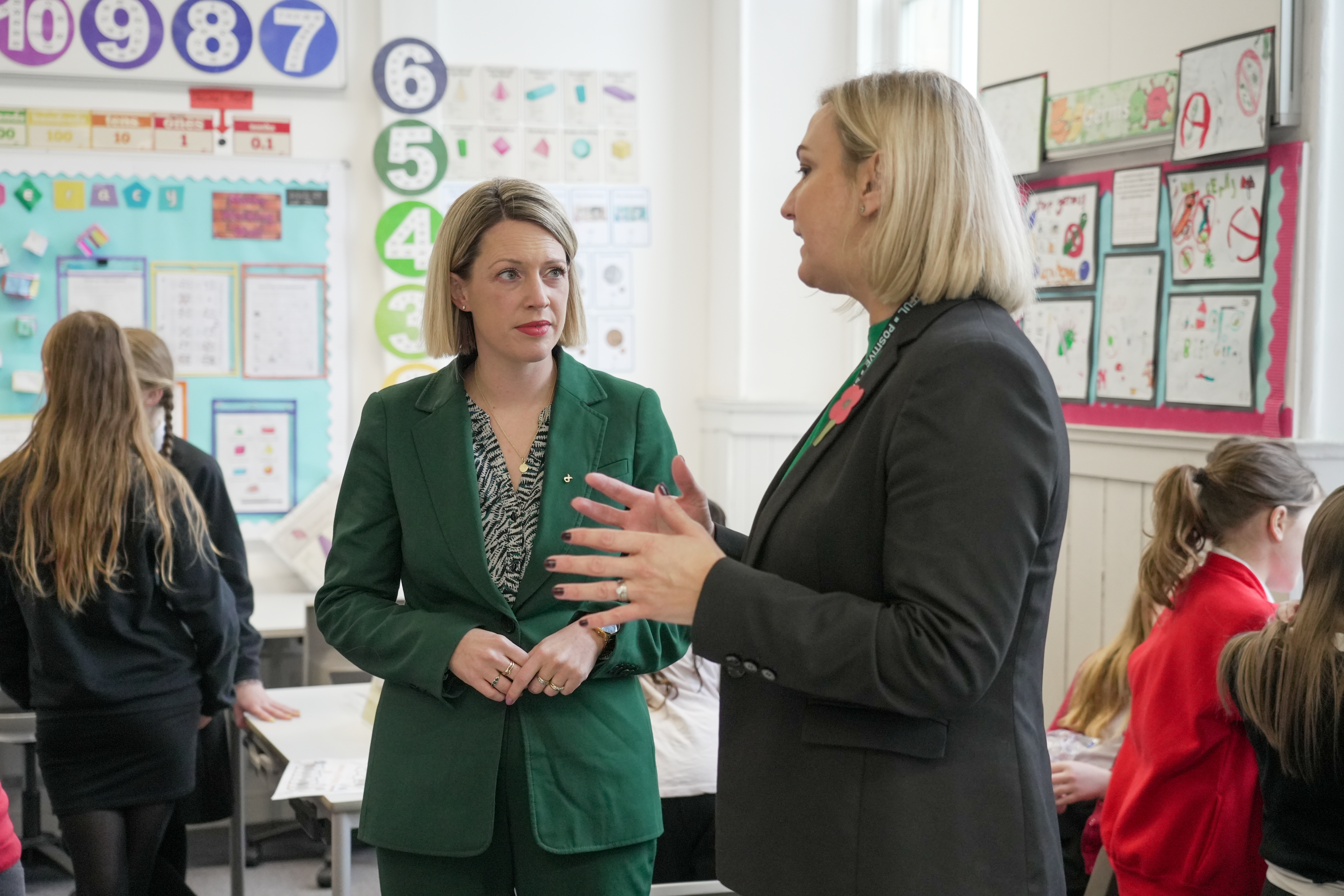
Gilruth (centre) with Lyndsay McRoberts, Director of Education at South Ayrshire Council, November 2024

In an interview with the Times Educational Supplement in March 2025, Gilruth confirmed that tackling school–based violence and the "deterioration in behaviour" was a "big priority for the Scottish Government". In the interview, Gilruth claimed that the way in which schools are funded "must be looked at", citing "the wider role schools are now playing in supporting struggling families". She also expressed concerns over the number of school pupils leaving school early in Scotland, as well as the "lack of equity" on courses which are currently being provided to pupils in the upper stages of secondary schools in the country.

=== Hayward Review and examinations ===
In September 2024, Gilruth announced that, moving forward, exams would "play a smaller role in the overall grade" pupils obtain at school. Her announcement followed a major report into the matter, which highlighted "pupils should not sit examinations prior to entering Fifth year". Gilruth confirmed that "exams would still play a part in most courses, but that more emphasis should be put on coursework and classroom assessment". The Scottish Government was criticised for failing to implement more recommendations made in the report into Scotland's examination network, however, Gilruth stated that other recommendations "needed more work" and were the "longer term aim of the Scottish Government to implement".

The Hayward Review of Scotland's Qualifications System report recommended "a wider range of assessment measures for Highers and Advanced Highers courses". Speaking to the Scottish Parliament, she confirmed "the rebalance of assessment does not mean that exams will be removed and I can therefore confirm that examinations will remain part of our overall national approach and will not be removed from all National 5 courses".

=== Rural schools ===
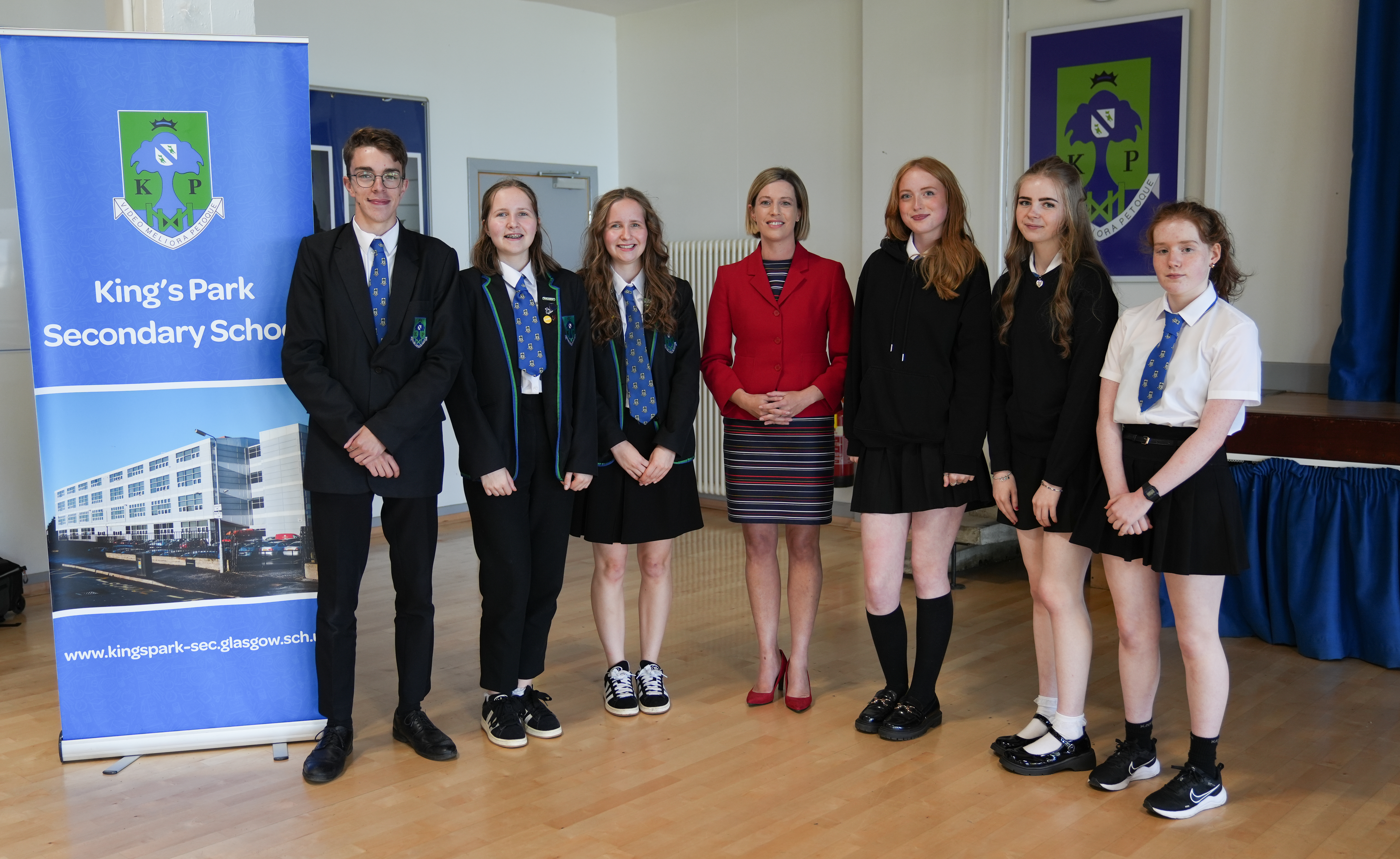
Gilruth with children from Kings Park Secondary School during Exam Results Day, 2025

In April 2024, Gilruth and the leader of the Highland Council, Raymond Bremner, met with parents of children attending rural schools in the Highland area of Scotland, following the establishment of the Save Our Rural Schools campaign. A letter was sent to parents by the campaign of children attending Ullapool, Gairloch High School, Kinlochbervie High School and Farr High, calling for a meeting to discuss the “dire state of the buildings". Following the meeting, Gilruth said that she would "promise future meetings to find solutions" to the issues identified by the campaign.

In March 2025, Gilruth was asked to intervene regarding the condition of Buckie High School in Moray, which was described as "one of the worst in Scotland" by a Moray Council councillor. The school was initially set to benefit from funding through the Scottish Government's Learning Estate Investment Programme (LEIP) Phase 3 project, however, after substantial cuts made by Moray Council to their budget, the likelihood of any substantial programme of refurbishment at the school commencing were cut dramatically. The school, through the funding from the Scottish Government investment programme, was initially set to be reconstructed.

=== Tuition fees ===
In March 2025, Gilruth confirmed that the Scottish Government "will stand by free tuition fees" despite funding challenges faced by Scottish universities. She confirmed that the Scottish National Party (SNP) who run the Scottish Government, will "never support a policy where we bring back tuition fees", claiming that "we need to look to the progress we have made in relation to widening access to children from our poorer communities".

Gilruth was accused of "lack of accountability" by the Scottish Conservatives following the announcement by the University of Dundee that it was to cut 632 jobs in an attempt to reduce its £35 million defect.

== Deputy First Minister (2026–present) ==
Gilruth was appointed as Deputy First Minister on 20 May 2026, replacing Kate Forbes, who had chosen to retire from politics at the 2026 election.

=== Finance Secretary ===
Alongside her role as Deputy First Minister, Gilruth was also appointed as the Cabinet Secretary for Finance and Local Government by John Swinney.

== Political and personal views ==
In September 2024, she stated that the quality of debate in the Scottish Parliament could be improved by limiting the use of mobile phones and tablets among MSPs.

== Personal life ==
On 15 July 2017, it was announced Gilruth was in a relationship with Kezia Dugdale, who was leader of the Scottish Labour Party. In June 2022, Gilruth and Dugdale married in a private ceremony. They live in Markinch as of 2017.

Scottish Parliament
Preceded by Tricia Marwick	Member of the Scottish Parliament for Mid Fife and Glenrothes; 2016–present	Incumbent
