= Richard Simpson (Scottish politician) =

Scottish politician (born 1942)

Richard Simpson OBE
- Simpson in 2011

Member of the Scottish Parliament for Mid Scotland and Fife (1 of 7 Regional MSPs)
- In office 3 May 2007 – 24 March 2016

Member of the Scottish Parliament for Ochil
- In office 6 May 1999 – 31 March 2003
- Preceded by: Constituency Created
- Succeeded by: George Reid

Personal details
- Born: 22 October 1942 (age 83) Edinburgh, Scotland
- Party: Scottish Labour Party
- Spouse: Christine Simpson
- Education: University of Edinburgh
- Occupation: Psychiatrist
- Website: www.richardsimpsonmsp.com

Richard John Simpson OBE (born 22 October 1942) is a Scottish Labour politician, and was Member of the Scottish Parliament (MSP) for the Ochil constituency from 1999 until 2003 and for the Mid Scotland and Fife region from 2007 until 2016. He is a member of Unite.

Simpson was instrumental in lobbying to pass two gun laws, following the Dunblane school massacre: the Firearms (Amendment) Act 1997 and, after the general election that year, the Firearms (Amendment) (No. 2) Act 1997, which in effect banned almost all handguns across the Kingdoms.

== Medical career ==
Simpson was educated at Perth Academy, Trinity College Glenalmond, and the University of Edinburgh.

A GP and psychiatrist prior to his election, Simpson is a fellow of the Royal College of Psychiatrists and a fellow of the Royal College of General Practitioners. He was also a former associate member of the British Association of Urological Surgeons and a member of the faculty's working group on prostate cancer.

He was a founding member and chair of the Strathcarron Hospice, Denny.

Between 2003 and 2007 he worked within Addiction medicine, first within Glasgow then as consultant psychiatrist in charge of the Drug Addiction Team of West Lothian.

== Scottish Parliament ==
Simpson was elected in 1999 as the first MSP for Ochil. In his first term, Simpson was a member of the Finance Committee (17 June 1999 – 28 November 2001), the Standards Committee (18 October 1999 – 10 November 1999) and a member of the Health and Community Care Committee (17 June 1999 – 28 November 2001). As appointed Reporter to the Health and Community Care Committee, he produced three reports on the Stobhill Medium Secure Unit consultation process by Greater Glasgow Health Board, influenza vaccination in Scotland and organ donation. He was made the deputy Justice minister when Jack McConnell became First Minister in 2001. As a minister, Simpson launched the Scotland's People genealogy web page in 2002. He lost his seat at the 2003 election.

Simpson was returned to the Scottish Parliament in 2007 as third on the Labour regional list for Mid Scotland and Fife. He was the Deputy Party Spokesperson on Health for the Labour Party. In the 2007 parliament he was the Labour lead on the Health and Wellbeing Committee and also Co-Convener of the Cross-Party Groups in the Scottish Parliament on Drug and Alcohol Misuse and on Mental Health, and a member of the Cross-Party Groups in the Scottish Parliament on Epilepsy, Golf, Palestine, Tobacco Control and Visual Impairment. In 2007, along with other opposition MSPs, he raised concerns about plans for local licensing boards to ban under 21 alcohol sales, stating that this would discriminate against young people who were responsible drinkers.

At the election on 5 May 2011, he was again returned to Holyrood as a regional MSP for Mid Scotland and Fife. Simpson's campaigns in 2011 included 'Save Waterwatch', the undergrounding of the electricity line from Beauly to Denny and stop the running of night trains on the Stirling-Alloa-Kincardine railway line.

Simpson was appointed Officer of the Order of the British Empire (OBE) in the 2017 Birthday Honours for services to Scottish politics and public life.

Scottish Parliament
| New constituency | Member of the Scottish Parliament for Ochil; 1999–2003 | Succeeded by George Reid |
Political offices
| Preceded by Iain Gray | Deputy Minister for Justice; 2001–2002 | Succeeded by Hugh Henry |
