= Alex Fergusson (politician) =

Scottish Conservative politician (1949–2018)

The Right Honourable Sir Alex Fergusson DL
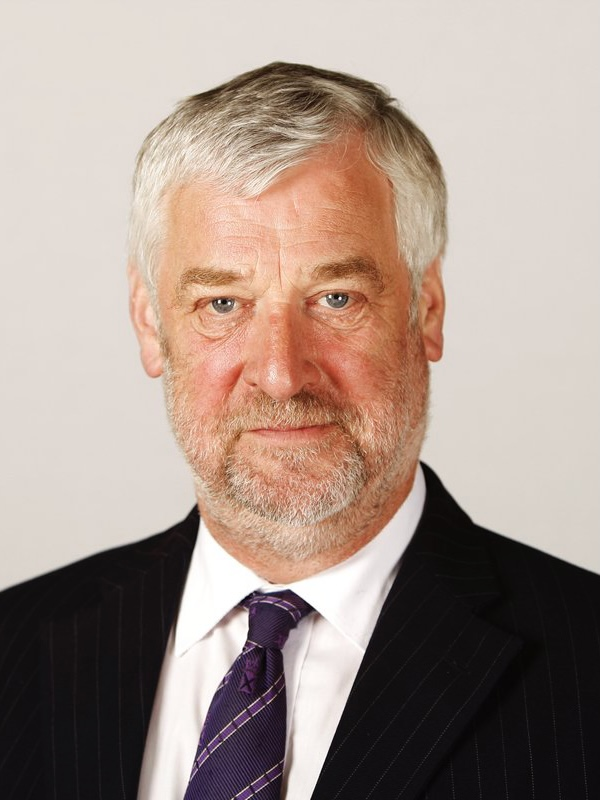
- Official portrait, 2011

Presiding Officer of the Scottish Parliament
- In office 14 May 2007 – 11 May 2011
- Monarch: Elizabeth II
- Deputy: Trish Godman; Alasdair Morgan
- Preceded by: George Reid
- Succeeded by: Tricia Marwick
Parliamentary offices
Member of the Scottish Parliament for Galloway and West Dumfries Galloway and Upper Nithsdale (2003–2011)
In office 1 May 2003 – 24 March 2016
Preceded by	Alasdair Morgan
Succeeded by	Finlay Carson
Member of the Scottish Parliament for South of Scotland (1 of 7 Regional MSPs)
In office 6 May 1999 – 31 March 2003

Personal details
- Born: Alexander Charles Onslow Fergusson; 8 April 1949 Leswalt, Dumfries and Galloway, Scotland
- Died: 31 July 2018 (aged 69) St John's Town of Dalry, Dumfries and Galloway, Scotland
- Party: Scottish Conservatives
- Other political affiliations: Independent (2007-2011)
- Spouse: Merryn Fergusson
- Children: Iain; Dougal; Christopher
- Parent(s): Simon Fergusson; Auriole Hughes-Onslow
- Education: Eton College; Scotland's Rural College
- Profession: Farmer

Sir Alexander Charles Onslow Fergusson DL (8 April 1949 – 31 July 2018) was a Scottish politician and farmer who served as Presiding Officer of the Scottish Parliament from 2007 to 2011. A member of the Scottish Conservative Party, he was Member of the Scottish Parliament (MSP) from 1999 to 2016.

Born in rural Wigtownshire, Fergusson was educated at Eton College before attending the Scottish Agricultural College at Auchincruive. After completing an ONDA, he took over his family farm estate in 1971. As a farmer, Fergusson gained a considerable reputation, becoming President of the Blackface Sheepbreeders’ Association, Deputy Lieutenant of Ayrshire and Arran and a member of the Scottish Landowners Federation and the Game Conservancy Trust.

In 1999, Fergusson was elected to the Scottish Parliament, representing the South of Scotland region. As an MSP, he was a lead spokesman for Agriculture and Forestry for the Conservative party and Convener of the Rural Development Committee. In the 2003 election, he was elected as an MSP for the Galloway and Upper Nithsdale. After being re-elected in 2007, he was elected as the 3rd Presiding Officer of the Scottish Parliament. Fergusson stepped down as presiding officer after the 2011 election and returned to backbench politics. He stood down as an MSP in the 2016 Scottish Parliament election.

== Early life ==
=== Early years and education ===
Alexander Charles Onslow Fergusson was born on 8 April 1949 in Leswalt, Wigtownshire as the son of Simon Fergusson and Auriole Hughes-Onslow. His father was a Lieutenant Colonel in the Argyll and Sutherland Highlanders before becoming a Church of Scotland minister at Leswalt. Fergusson was raised in South Ayrshire.

Fergusson was educated at Eton College from 1962 to 1966. He spent two years in New Zealand after leaving school, mainly involved in agricultural work. He returned to Scotland and attended the Scottish Agricultural College at Auchincruive to complete an ONDA.

=== Farming career ===
In 1971, Fergusson took over his family farm in Barr. He ran this hill farm, rearing cattle and sheep, gaining a considerable reputation in farming circles. Fergusson later became the President of the Blackface Sheepbreeders’ Association. He was a Deputy Lieutenant of Ayrshire and Arran and a member of the Scottish Landowners Federation and the Game Conservancy Trust.

== Political career ==
=== Election to Holyrood ===
Fergusson began holding office as a Community Councillor. He was elected as a member for the South of Scotland region of the Scottish Parliament 1999, and was a Member of the Scottish Parliament for Galloway and Upper Nithsdale from 2003.

Fergusson said he entered politics mainly to champion rural causes in his own region: "I was particularly exercised by the fact that whenever anybody talked about rural Scotland, they seemed to talk about the Highlands and Islands. I come from the south of Scotland, and I was keen to provide a rural voice from the south of Scotland."

During this time, Fergusson was lead spokesman for Agriculture and Forestry for the Conservative party, and Convener of the Rural Development Committee, including during the passage of the Protection of Wild Mammals (Scotland) Act 2002. As spokesman, he described laws banning entirely the docking of dogs' tails as "complete and utter folly", arguing that there was a significant difference between the cosmetic docking of entire tails and the shortening of the tails of working dogs. He gained a reputation as a passionate advocate on rural affairs, respected across parties for his political astuteness. He was also one of the biggest rebels from the Conservative whip in the second session of Parliament.

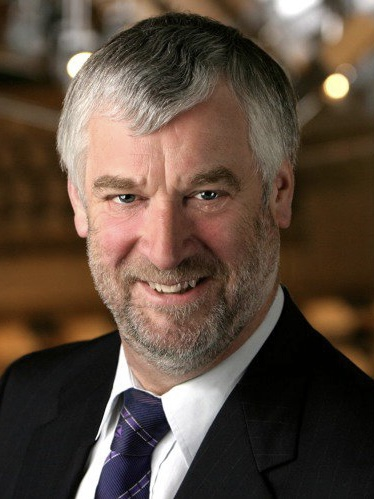
Fergusson as Presiding Officer of the Scottish Parliament, May 2007

=== Presiding Officer of the Scottish Parliament ===
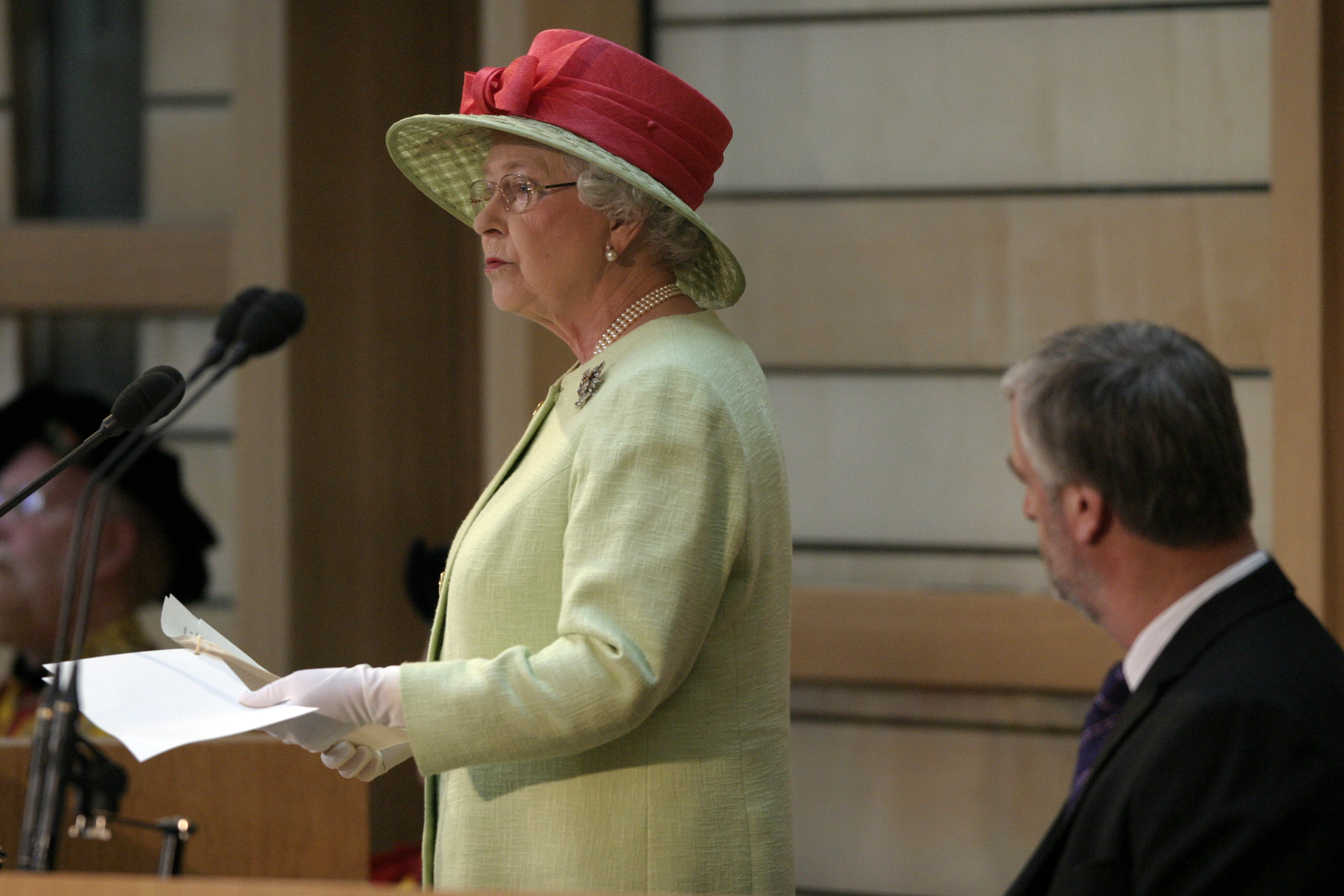
Queen Elizabeth II alongside Fergusson at the opening of the 3rd Scottish Parliament in 2007

After retaining his marginal seat at the 2007 election, with an increased majority of 3,333, on 14 May 2007 he was elected by his fellow MSPs to succeed George Reid as Presiding Officer by a large majority, beating the other candidate Margo MacDonald by 108 votes to 20.

Because the position of Presiding Officer is an impartial one, the officeholder is required to remove himself from all party politics. Consequently, Fergusson resigned from the Conservative party. He indicated his intention to resign as Presiding Officer at the conclusion of his term, and stand for the Conservative party in 2011. On his return to the Parliament after the 2011 Election, Fergusson stepped down as Presiding Officer and returned to the Conservative benches.

As Presiding Officer, he chaired the Scottish Parliamentary Corporate Body, which has similar functions to that of the House of Commons Commission, and the Parliamentary Bureau, which sets the daily business in the chamber and timetable for progress of bills, subject to approval by the Parliament.

Fergusson announced in 2015 that he would not be seeking re-election in 2016 and would retire from politics after serving as MSP for 17 years. He was succeeded by Finlay Carson at the 2016 election.

Fergusson was knighted in the 2016 Birthday Honours for services to politics, the Scottish parliamentary process and public life in Scotland.

== Personal life ==
Fergusson was the Honorary President of English-Speaking Union Scotland. He was a patron of the Galloway National Park Association, a campaign for the area to become Scotland's third national park. He listed rugby, curling, Scottish country dancing, folk music and public speaking amongst his hobbies.

Fergusson was a male-line grandson of Sir Charles Fergusson, 7th Baronet and so was in the remainder to that baronetcy. He was also descended from many Scottish noble families including the Earls of Glasgow, Earls of Dalhousie, and Barons Crofton

Fergusson was knighted in the 2016 Birthday Honours for services to politics, the Scottish parliamentary process and public life in Scotland.

=== Death ===
Sir Alex Fergusson died on 31 July 2018, at the age of 69. The First Minister of Scotland Nicola Sturgeon paid tribute on Twitter, calling Fergusson a "distinguished presiding officer" and a "dedicated parliamentarian". The then leader of the Scottish Conservative Party Ruth Davidson also paid tribute on Twitter, calling Fergusson a "huge figure in the Scottish Conservative Party" and said that he "will be missed by many".

Scottish Parliament
Preceded by Alasdair Morgan	Member of the Scottish Parliament for Galloway & Upper Nithsdale; 2003–2016	Succeeded by Finlay Carson
Political offices
Preceded by George Reid	Presiding Officer of the Scottish Parliament; 2007–2011	Succeeded by Tricia Marwick
