= Scotland's Futures Forum =

Scottish think tank

Scotland's Futures Forum (Scottish Gaelic: Fòram Alba air Thoiseach) is a think tank set up by the Scottish Parliament. It has the aim of looking beyond the immediate electoral cycle to consider the opportunities and problems that the country might face.

== History ==
The forum was launched in August 2005, with the first meeting chaired by Presiding Officer George Reid.

== Purpose ==
According to the Parliament:

'Scotland's Futures Forum, the Scottish Parliament's initiative to develop strategic thinking on the issues which will shape Scotland's future, moves forward today with the announcement of the eight individuals who will make up the Forum's board of directors. The Scottish Parliamentary Corporate Body (SPCB) has agreed to create a new company, with the SPCB as the sole member, which extends the Parliament's outreach and participation work to academia, the arts, blue chip companies, civic Scotland and entrepreneurs. Leading figures from the private and public sectors have volunteered their services on a two year initial basis.'

In 2007 the forum considered matters such as ageing and addiction. In 2013, together with the Goodison Group, they published a report on future of education in Scotland.

== Board of directors ==
In 2022 the directors are:

- Alison Johnstone MSP, Presiding Officer of the Scottish Parliament (Chair)
- Maggie Chapman MSP
- Kirsten Hogg, Head of Policy & Research at SCVO
- Diarmaid Lawlor, Associate Director (Place) at the Scottish Futures Trust
- Sarah Munro, Director of the Baltic Mill Centre for Contemporary Art
- Stuart McMillan MSP
- Esther Roberton, Chair of Fife Cultural Trust, Director of the Fife Housing Group
- Alex Rowley MSP
- Brian Whittle MSP
