= Alasdair Morgan =

Scottish politician (born 1945)

Deputy Presiding Officer of the Scottish Parliament
- In office 10 May 2007 – 22 March 2011 Serving with Trish Godman
- Presiding Officer: Alex Fergusson
- Preceded by: Murray Tosh
- Succeeded by: John Scott

Depute Leader of the Scottish National Party
- In office 22 September 1990 – 22 September 1991
- Leader: Alex Salmond
- Preceded by: Alex Salmond
- Succeeded by: Jim Sillars
Parliamentary offices
Member of the Scottish Parliament for South of Scotland (1 of 7 Regional MSPs)
In office 1 May 2003 – 22 March 2011
Member of the Scottish Parliament for Galloway and Upper Nithsdale
In office 6 May 1999 – 1 May 2003
Preceded by	Constituency established
Succeeded by	Alex Fergusson
Member of Parliament for Galloway and Upper Nithsdale
In office 1 May 1997 – 14 May 2001
Preceded by	Ian Lang
Succeeded by	Peter Duncan

Personal details
- Born: 21 April 1945 (age 81) Aberfeldy, Perthshire, Scotland
- Party: Scottish National Party
- Spouse: Anne Gilfillan
- Children: 2
- Education: University of Glasgow; Open University
- Profession: Teacher, Computer programmer

Alasdair Neil Morgan (born 21 April 1945) is a former Scottish National Party (SNP) politician. He was Deputy Leader of the Scottish National Party from 1990 to 1991 and served in the House of Commons as the Member of Parliament for Galloway and Upper Nithsdale from 1997 to 2001. He was elected in 1999 as a Member of the Scottish Parliament (MSP) for Galloway and Upper Nithsdale. From 2003 to 2011, he served as a member for the South of Scotland region.

Morgan was a Deputy Presiding Officer of the Scottish Parliament from 2007 to 2011. He was an Electoral Commissioner from 2014 to 2022.

== Early life and career ==
Morgan was born in Aberfeldy and was educated at Breadalbane Academy and the University of Glasgow, graduating in 1968 with a MA Honours degree in Mathematics and Political economy. From 1971 to 1974 he worked as a Teacher of Mathematics at Linlithgow Academy and subsequently Douglas Ewart High School. He graduated from the Open University with a Bachelor of Arts degree in 1990.

He was employed as a Software Programmer at Shell from 1974 to 1980, then as a Systems Analyst with General Electric from 1980 to 1984. He then worked as a Computer Systems Team Leader at Fife Regional Council (1984–1986), Lothian Regional Council (1986–1996) and West Lothian Council (1996–1997).

== Political career ==
Morgan joined the Scottish National Party in 1974. He served as SNP National Treasurer from 1983 to 1990, when he was elected Senior Vice Convener (depute leader) at the same election that saw Alex Salmond first elected as Leader of the Scottish National Party. Morgan was defeated by Jim Sillars in the depute leadership election the following year, but served as National Secretary from 1992 to 1997. During that same year, he was elected as one of the SNP's vice presidents; an office he held until these positions were abolished as part of the party's constitutional reforms in 2004.

He was the SNP candidate for the Tayside North constituency in 1983, Dundee West in 1987 and Dumfries in 1992.

Morgan was elected as the Member of Parliament for Galloway and Upper Nithsdale at the 1997 general election and served as a member of the Trade and Industry Select Committee and as leader of the SNP parliamentary group in the House of Commons from 1999 to 2001. Morgan stepped down at the 2001 general election.

He was elected as the Member of the Scottish Parliament (MSP) for Galloway and Upper Nithsdale in 1999, with a majority of 3,201 votes. He served as convener of the Justice and Home Affairs Committee from 2000 to 2001. At the 2003 Scottish Parliamentary election, he narrowly lost his constituency seat to Alex Fergusson of the Scottish Conservative Party by just 99 votes. However, he was elected as a List MSP for the South of Scotland region. In 2007, he was re-elected by the regional list.

Morgan served as convener of the Enterprise and Culture Committee from 2003 to 2004, convener of the SNP parliamentary group from 2003 to 2005, and as SNP chief whip from 2005 to 2007. Morgan was a Deputy Presiding Officer of the Scottish Parliament from 2007 to 2011. He retired as an MSP at the 2011 Scottish Parliamentary election. In May 2014, he was appointed as an Electoral Commissioner and served until Sep 2022.

== Personal life ==
Morgan is married with two daughters. He lives in Dunfermline, Fife.

Parliament of the United Kingdom
Preceded by Ian Lang	Member of Parliament for Galloway and Upper Nithsdale; 1997–2001	Succeeded by Peter Duncan
Scottish Parliament
New constituency	Member of the Scottish Parliament for Galloway and Upper Nithsdale; 1999–2003	Succeeded by Alex Fergusson
Preceded by Michael Russell	Member of the Scottish Parliament for South of Scotland; 2003–2011	Succeeded by Chic Brodie
Party political offices
Preceded by Michael Murgatroyd	Treasurer of the Scottish National Party; 1983–1990	Succeeded by Tom Chalmers
Preceded by Alex Salmond	Senior Vice Convener (Depute Leader) of the Scottish National Party; 1990–1991	Succeeded by Jim Sillars
Preceded by John Swinney	National Secretary of the Scottish National Party; 1992–1997	Succeeded by Stewart Hosie
