= Peter Duncan (British politician) =

British politician (born 1965)

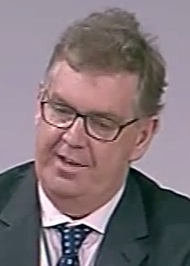

Shadow Secretary of State for Scotland
- In office 10 November 2003 – 6 May 2005
- Leader: Michael Howard
- Preceded by: Jacqui Lait
- Succeeded by: James Gray

Member of Parliament for Galloway and Upper Nithsdale
- In office 7 June 2001 – 11 April 2005
- Preceded by: Alasdair Morgan
- Succeeded by: constituency abolished

Personal details
- Born: Peter John Duncan; 10 July 1965 (age 61) Saltcoats, Scotland
- Party: Conservative
- Spouse: Lorna Anne
- Children: 2
- Education: University of Birmingham

Peter John Duncan (born 10 July 1965) is a Scottish Conservative Party politician. He was the member of parliament (MP) for Galloway and Upper Nithsdale from 2001 to 2005.

== Early life ==
Born in Ayrshire, Duncan attended Ardrossan Academy in Ardrossan, North Ayrshire and was educated at the University of Birmingham where he obtained a BCom in 1985. He later worked as a business and communications consultant for Mackays Stores Ltd from 1985 to 1988 in addition to running the family textile business John Duncan & Son from 1988 to 2000. In September 1997, he appeared as a member of the audience during a Scottish Television debate about the devolution referendum, and spoke opposing the establishment of a Scottish Parliament. Duncan later stood for election to the very parliament he initially opposed.

== Parliamentary career ==
He was elected to the House of Commons at the 2001 general election, taking the Galloway and Upper Nithsdale seat from the Scottish National Party. This made him the sole Conservative MP for the whole of Scotland and the first Conservative MP from Scotland since 1997. In November 2003 he was appointed Shadow Secretary of State for Scotland by new party leader, Michael Howard and he was later named as Chairman of the Scottish Conservative Party.

His constituency was abolished for the 2005 general election and replaced by Dumfries and Galloway. He lost to Labour's Russell Brown.

In the 2007 local elections, the first to take place under the Single Transferable Vote system, he was one of several new Conservative councillors elected to Dumfries and Galloway council.

He stood as the Conservative candidate for the Dumfries and Galloway seat at the 2010 general election. He was defeated by the incumbent Russell Brown again, with a -3.7% swing against. The following year he stood as the Conservative candidate for Midlothian South, Tweeddale and Lauderdale at the Scottish Parliament election, where he came in fourth place.

Parliament of the United Kingdom
Preceded by Alasdair Morgan	Member of Parliament for Galloway and Upper Nithsdale; 2001–2005	Constituency abolished
Political offices
Preceded by Jacqui Lait	Shadow Secretary of State for Scotland; 2003–2005	Succeeded by James Gray
Party political offices
Preceded by David Mitchell	Chairman of the Scottish Conservative Party; 2004–2007	Succeeded by David Mundell
