= Murray Tosh =

British politician (born 1950)

Deputy Presiding Officer of the Scottish Parliament
- In office 29 November 2001 – 2 April 2007 Serving with George Reid (2001–2003) and Trish Godman (2003–2007)
- Presiding Officer: David Steel; George Reid
- Preceded by: Patricia Ferguson
- Succeeded by: Alasdair Morgan
Parliamentary offices
Member of the Scottish Parliament
for West of Scotland
(1 of 7 Regional MSPs)
In office
1 May 2003 – 2 April 2007
Member of the Scottish Parliament
for South of Scotland
(1 of 7 Regional MSPs)
In office
6 May 1999 – 31 March 2003

Personal details
- Born: Neil Murray Tosh; 1 September 1950 (age 76) Ayr, Scotland
- Party: Scottish Conservative
- Other political affiliations: Liberal (1970s)

Neil Murray Tosh (born 1 September 1950) is a retired Scottish Conservative Party politician who served as a Member of the Scottish Parliament (MSP) for the South of Scotland region (1999–2003) and the West of Scotland region (2003–07).

== Early life and career ==
Born in Ayr, Tosh was educated at Kilmarnock Academy and the University of Glasgow, where he was president of the Liberal Club and graduated with a second-class honours degree in history and politics. He trained as a schoolteacher at Jordanhill College in Glasgow, and for nearly 25 years taught history at several schools in Ayrshire. Before being elected to the Scottish Parliament he was head of the history department at Belmont Academy in Ayr.

== Political career ==
Tosh contested Ayr at the October 1974 general election as a Liberal, and Glasgow Hillhead at the 1983 general election for the Conservatives. From 1987 to 1996, he represented Troon South-West ward on Kyle and Carrick District Council, where he rose to become deputy leader of the Conservative group.

At the inaugural election for the Scottish Parliament in 1999, Tosh stood as the Conservative candidate for Cunninghame South, where he came third; instead, he was elected to Holyrood as one of four candidates on the party's South of Scotland regional list. Regarded as being on the Conservative left, he was convener of the Procedures Committee during his first parliamentary term. In the debating chamber his contributions tended towards the histrionic: Robert McNeil, writing for The Scotsman, described him as "a great source of unwitting entertainment, gesturing like Mussolini on a balcony, as he wound himself up into ludicrous fits of passion about drains, minor roads and paper-clips."

In 2001, he announced his intention to stand down at the next election so that he could return to local government, prompting speculation that he was unhappy about the selection of right-winger Iain Duncan Smith as national party leader. However, he unexpectedly won the race to become a Deputy Presiding Officer that same year, defeating Cathy Peattie by 68 votes to 45, which led him to reverse his earlier decision to leave Holyrood. Press reports attributed his victory to the heavy-handed attempts by the Labour Party leader, Jack McConnell, to force his MSPs to support Peattie en masse, which prompted a backlash from several of them amid public allegations of 'cronyism'.

Tosh remained a Deputy Presiding Officer for the next six years, until the end of the second parliament in 2007. In that year's elections, he was the Conservative candidate for Dumfries, where he was defeated by Elaine Murray, the Labour incumbent. Having been placed fourth on the party's South of Scotland regional list, he therefore did not return to Holyrood as an MSP for the 2007–2011 session.

== Later years ==
In 2011, Tosh was one of those who backed Ruth Davidson's bid to become leader of the Scottish Conservative Party, describing her as a "breath of fresh air in Scottish politics".

In 2016, the representatives of the IndyCamp protesters stated that Tosh may own the Scottish Parliament building. This claim was dismissed by the lawyer for the Scottish Parliament.
