= Christine May =

Scottish politician (born 1948)

Member of the Scottish Parliament for Central Fife
- In office 1 May 2003 – 2 April 2007
- Preceded by: Henry McLeish
- Succeeded by: Tricia Marwick

Personal details
- Born: 23 March 1948 (age 78) Dublin, Ireland
- Party: Labour Co-operative

Christine May (born 23 March 1948, in Dublin) is a Scottish Labour Co-operative politician. She was the Member of the Scottish Parliament (MSP) for Central Fife constituency from 2003 to 2007.

Raised and educated in Dublin, Christine worked in the catering industry in Dublin and then London, and first moved to Scotland in 1984, where she became a college lecturer.

She was elected to the Central Fife seat after former First Minister Henry McLeish stood down as MSP following a scandal relating to the sub-letting of his constituency office – dubbed "Officegate" by the media. She had previously been leader of Fife Council from 1998. She represented a ward in Kirkcaldy as a councillor, and still lives in the town, which is just outside the Central Fife constituency. Her constituency office was based in Glenrothes, adjacent to Fife Council's headquarters.

In 2007, she lost her constituency to SNP politician Tricia Marwick.

Scottish Parliament
Preceded by Henry McLeish	Member of the Scottish Parliament for Central Fife; 2003–2007	Succeeded by Tricia Marwick
