= Michael Murgatroyd =

Scottish political activist

Michael Murgatroyd (1925–2004) was an English-born, Scottish nationalist political activist.

Born in Huddersfield, England, Michael Murgatroyd studied at Giggleswick School and served with the Royal Artillery, for the United Kingdom, during the Second World War. After the war, he worked for Dunlop and Firestone before marrying a Scottish woman, Yvonne, moving to Cockenzie House in Cockenzie.

Yvonne joined the Scottish National Party (SNP), and Michael soon followed, being inspired after hearing a speech by George Leslie. He took over as treasurer of the SNP in 1970, a time when the party's finances were in a poor state; within his first year in post, he arranged the sale of the party's headquarters, and reduced the salary bill. He became active in his trade union, and tried to gain recognition for the union, but he was made redundant in 1977, and relocated to Inverness, Scotland, where he worked by driving taxis. He remained the treasurer of the SNP until 1983, when he lost an internal election to Alasdair Morgan.

Party political offices
Preceded by Joe Gloag	Treasurer of the Scottish National Party; 1970–1983	Succeeded by Alasdair Morgan
