= Tricia Marwick =

Scottish Independent politician (born 1953)

The Right Honourable Tricia Marwick
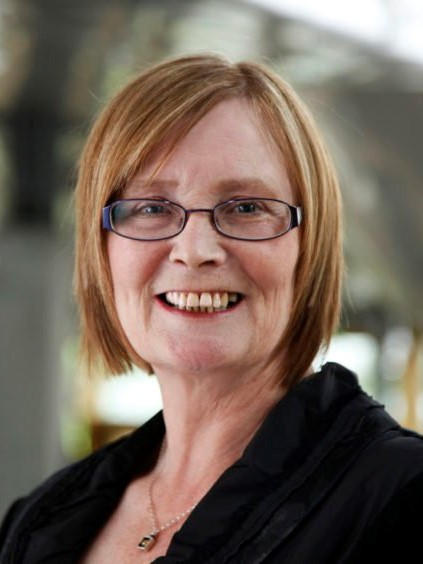
- Official portrait, 2011

Presiding Officer of the Scottish Parliament
- In office 11 May 2011 – 12 May 2016
- Monarch: Elizabeth II
- Deputy: John Scott; Elaine Smith
- Preceded by: Alex Fergusson
- Succeeded by: Ken Macintosh
Parliamentary offices
Member of the Scottish Parliament for Mid Fife and Glenrothes Central Fife (2007–2011)
In office 3 May 2007 – 24 March 2016
Preceded by	Christine May
Succeeded by	Jenny Gilruth
Member of the Scottish Parliament for Mid Scotland and Fife (1 of 7 Regional MSPs)
In office 6 May 1999 – March 2007

Personal details
- Born: Patricia Lee; 5 November 1953 (age 72) Cowdenbeath, Fife, Scotland
- Party: Independent (2011–present)
- Other political affiliations: Scottish National Party (1986–2011)
- Spouse: Frank Marwick (m. 1975)
- Relations: Natalie McGarry (niece)
- Children: 2
- Occupation: Charity Public Affairs Officer

Patricia Marwick (née Lee; born 5 November 1953) is a Scottish politician who served as Presiding Officer of the Scottish Parliament from 2011 to 2016. She was a Member of the Scottish Parliament (MSP) from 1999 to 2016. Elected as a member of the Scottish National Party (SNP), she suspended her membership in 2011 upon her election as presiding officer, following the tradition of the presiding officer being nonpartisan.

Born in Cowdenbeath and raised in Fife, she worked for Shelter Scotland before becoming a politician. In the first ever Scottish Parliament election, Marwick ran as an SNP candidate for the Central Fife constituency, but came second to Henry McLeish. Although she failed to win the seat in two elections, she was elected as an additional member for the Mid Scotland and Fife region. In the 2007 Scottish Parliament election, she defeated Scottish Labour's Christine May, and was elected to serve as the MSP for Central Fife.

Following the 2011 election to the 4th Scottish Parliament, Marwick was elected to the newly drawn Mid Fife and Glenrothes constituency. With the SNP's outright majority, she was elected as the fourth Presiding Officer of the Scottish Parliament. Marwick is the first woman to hold the position of office. As the Presiding Officer is a non-partisan role, she was forced to relinquish her party affiliation. She stood down from the Scottish Parliament in the 2016 election and the from 2016 to 2020, she served as chair of the NHS Fife board.

== Early life and career ==
Patricia Lee was born on 5 November 1953 in Cowdenbeath and was brought up in Fife, one of seven siblings. She worked as Public Affairs Officer for Shelter Scotland, a charity for homeless people, from 1992 to 1999.

== Member of the Scottish Parliament ==
At the 1999 Scottish Parliamentary election, Marwick was elected as a member for the Mid Scotland and Fife region. She served on the SNP opposition frontbench team as Deputy Business Manager (1999–2000), Shadow Minister for Local Government (2004), Business Manager and Chief Whip (2004–2005) and Shadow Minister for Housing (2005–2007). Marwick served as a member of the Scottish Parliament's Standards, Justice and Home Affairs, Equal Opportunities, Local Government and Communities committees and as convenor of the Waverly Railway (Scotland) Bill committee (2004–06).

At the 2003 Scottish Parliamentary election she contested the Central Fife seat and, although she narrowly failed to win the seat, she was re-elected to serve as a member for Mid Scotland and Fife. Marwick contested Central Fife again in 2007 and was elected as the constituencies MSP after defeating the Labour incumbent, Christine May, with a majority of 1,166 votes.

Following the 2007 election Marwick was appointed as the SNP's representative on the Scottish Parliamentary Corporate Body, and oversaw parliamentary access and information issues.

== Presiding Officer of the Scottish Parliament ==
In the 2011 election, Marwick was elected for the Mid Fife and Glenrothes constituency, essentially a redrawing of her old Central Fife seat. On 11 May 2011, when Parliament reconvened, Marwick was elected to serve as the 4th Presiding Officer of the Scottish Parliament, having won support from the majority of members in the second round of voting. She became the first woman and second SNP member to serve in the position. In October 2012, Marwick accepted a nomination to join the Privy Council, meaning that she is styled the Rt Hon. Tricia Marwick MSP.

On 29 May 2015, it was announced that Marwick would stand down as Presiding Officer at the 2016 election. She also left elected politics as a whole. Upon standing down, she was made an offer to have her name put forward for an honour from the Queen but turned the offer down.

== After Parliament ==
Marwick was announced as the new chair for the NHS Fife board in November 2016, replacing Allan Burns who resigned from the post in August 2016. Her appointment as chair ran from 1 January 2017 until 31 December 2020.

In 2021 Marwick tweeted journalist Fraser Nelson, who had published articles critical of the Scottish Government, that, "We see you Fraser. We see what you are trying to do. Have never seen you challenge Westminster Governments. Scottish birth not alone does a Scotsman make, sometimes it signifies a Scotsman on the make." Nelson replied, “While raised in the Highlands I guess I was never quite properly Scottish. How could you tell?” The Scottish Conservatives said Marwick "should clearly have known better than to pander to the most extreme wing of her party" and she deleted the tweet.

In 2022 a student newspaper at St Andrew's University ran a satirical article in which it criticised Nicola Sturgeon as "too scary" for Hell and suggested that England “boot Scotland out of the union”. Marwick denounced St Andrew's as “not a Fife university” and described students as “pathetic wee trolls”. “I regret the Saint run by the University of St Andrews students just buys into every stereotype we Fifers have of them," she tweeted. “Poor souls who failed to get into Oxbridge display every prejudice; anti Scottish and anti women.” Local MSP Willie Rennie and MP Wendy Chamberlain said: “It was one article, published by one student out of several thousand students and staff at St Andrews. It does not represent the views of staff and students. It was therefore wholly unacceptable for the chair of NHS Fife to trash the whole university with offensive remarks too.” Marwick later deleted the tweet.

== Personal life ==
Marwick's niece is Natalie McGarry, the former MP for Glasgow East.

Political offices
Preceded by Alex Fergusson	Presiding Officer of the Scottish Parliament; 2011–2016	Succeeded by Ken Macintosh
