= Mid Fife and Glenrothes =

Region or constituency of the Scottish Parliament

- County constituency for the Scottish Parliament
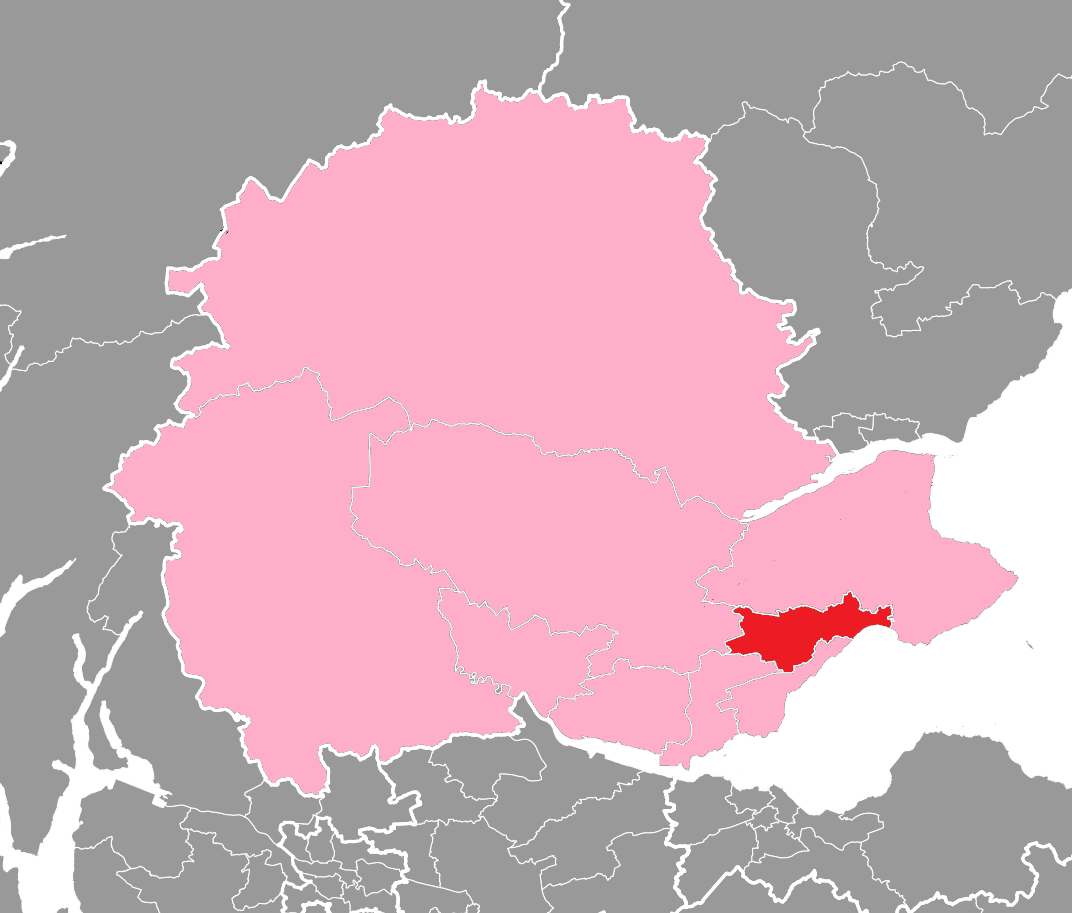

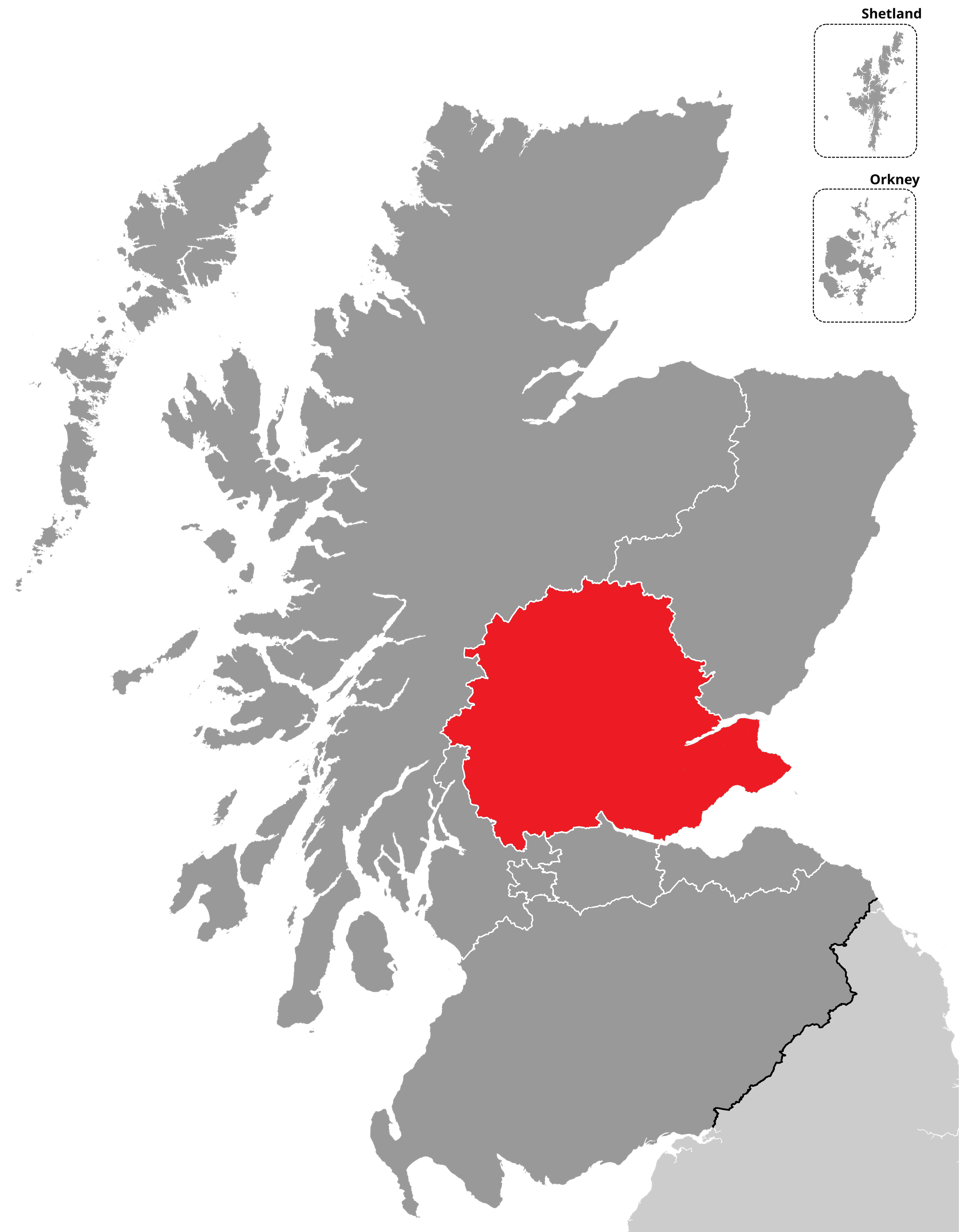
- Mid Fife and Glenrothes shown within the Mid Scotland and Fife electoral region and the region shown within Scotland
- Electoral region: Mid Scotland and Fife
- Electorate: 55,417 (2026)

Current constituency
- Created: 2011
- Party: SNP
- MSP: Jenny Gilruth
- Council area: Fife

Mid Fife and Glenrothes is a county constituency of the Scottish Parliament covering part of the council area of Fife. Under the additional-member electoral system used for elections to the Scottish Parliament, it elects one Member of the Scottish Parliament (MSP) by the plurality (first past the post) method of election. It also forms one of the nine constituencies in the Mid Scotland and Fife electoral region, which elects seven additional members, in addition to the nine constituency MSPs, to produce a form of proportional representation for the region as a whole. Created in 2011, the constituency comprises most of the previous Central Fife constituency which was abolished for the 2011 Scottish Parliament election.

The seat has been held by Jenny Gilruth of the Scottish National Party since the 2016 Scottish Parliament election.

== Electoral region ==
The other eight constituencies of the Mid Scotland and Fife region are: Clackmannanshire and Dunblane, Cowdenbeath, Dunfermline, Fife North East, Kirkcaldy, Perthshire North, Perthshire South and Kinross-shire and Stirling. The regions covers all of the Clackmannanshire council area, the Fife council area, the Perth and Kinross council area and the Stirling council area.

== Constituency boundaries and council area ==
Map of boundaries from 2011

Fife is represented in the Scottish Parliament by five constituencies, Cowdenbeath, Dunfermline, Fife North East, Kirkcaldy, and Mid Fife and Glenrothes.

The seat was created as a result of the first periodic review of Scottish Parliament boundaries in 2011, and covers the new town of Glenrothes, alongwith smaller settlements such as Largo, Leven, and Kennoway. The following electoral wards of Fife Council were used to define the constituency of Mid Fife and Glenrothes at this review:

- Glenrothes West and Kinglassie (entire ward)
- Glenrothes North, Leslie and Markinch (entire ward)
- Glenrothes Central and Thornton (entire ward)
- Leven, Kennoway and Largo (entire ward)

At the second periodic review of Scottish Parliament boundaries in 2025 the seat boundaries were left unchanged.

== Member of the Scottish Parliament ==
Election	Member	Party
2011	Tricia Marwick	SNP
2011	Tricia Marwick	Presiding Officer
2016	Jenny Gilruth	SNP

== Election results ==
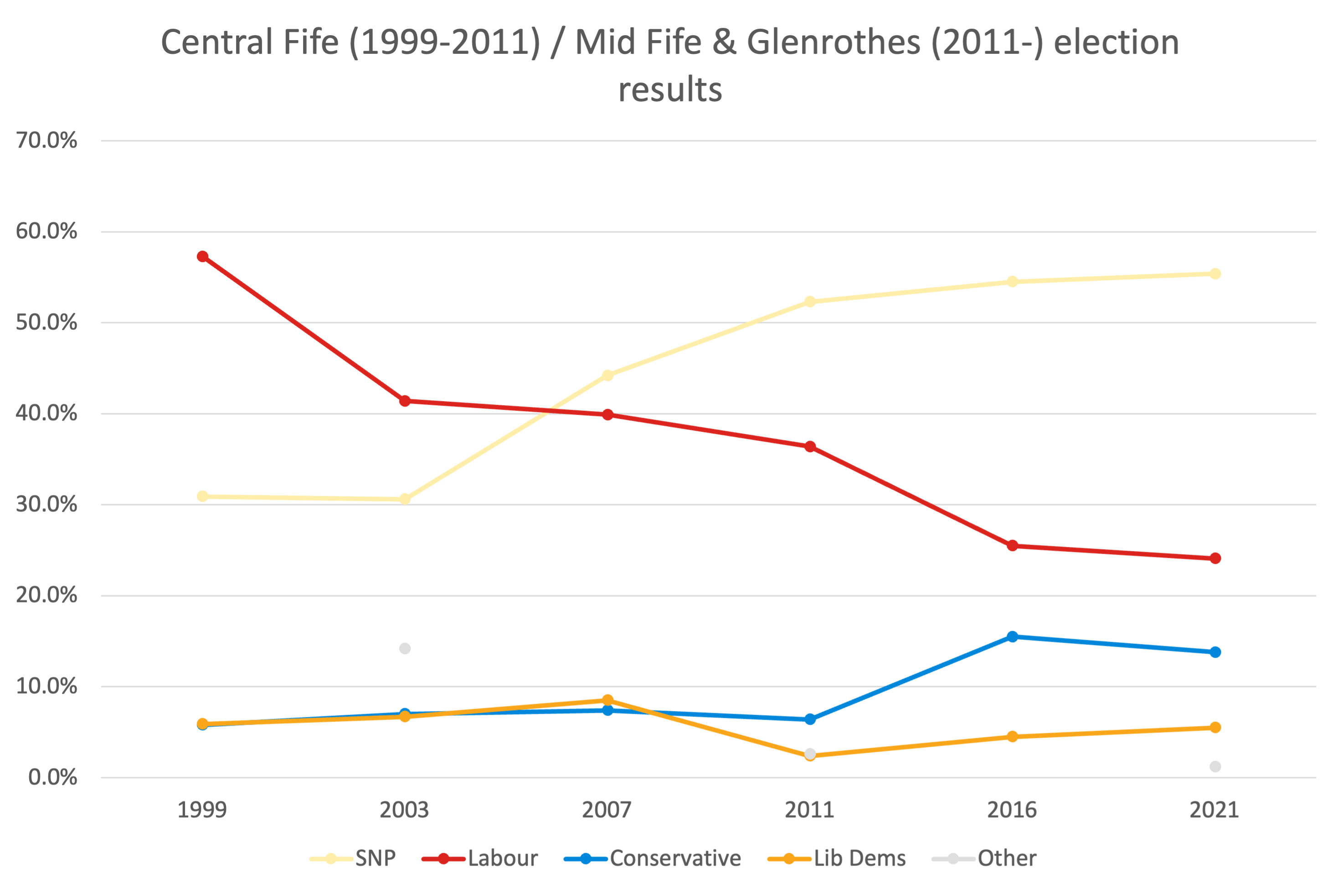
Mid Fife & Glenrothes election results 1999-2021

=== 2020s ===
2026 Scottish Parliament election: Mid Fife and Glenrothes
Party	Candidate	Constituency			Regional		
Party	Candidate	Votes	%	±%	Votes	%	±%
SNP	Jenny Gilruth (Note: Incumbent member for this constituency)	12,461	48.5	▼6.9	9,296	36.0	▼12.5
Reform	Sacha Haworth	4,827	18.8	New	4,873	18.9	▲18.7
Labour	Afifa Khanam	3,970	15.4	▼8.7	3,824	14.8	▼4.5
Liberal Democrats	Ed Scotcher	3,047	11.8	▲6.3	2,800	10.8	▲6.0
Green					2,244	8.7	▲3.2
Conservative	Niamh Heald	1,414	5.5	▼8.3	1,755	6.8	▼10.5
AtLS					263	1.0	New
ISP					213	0.8	New
Independent Green Voice					209	0.8	New
Scottish Family					182	0.7	Steady
Scottish Socialist					77	0.3	New
Advance UK					54	0.2	New
Scottish Libertarian					52	0.2	Steady
Majority		7,634	29.7	▼1.6			
Valid votes		25,719			25,842		
Invalid votes		102			58		
Turnout		25,821	46.6	▼13.3	25,900	46.7	▼13.2
SNP hold		Swing					
Notes

2021 Scottish Parliament election: Mid Fife and Glenrothes
Party	Candidate	Constituency			Regional		
Party	Candidate	Votes	%	±%	Votes	%	±%
SNP	Jenny Gilruth (Note: Incumbent member for this constituency)	18,115	55.4	▲0.9	15,877	48.5	▼2.1
Labour	Altany Craik	7,881	24.1	▼1.4	6,326	19.3	▼2.9
Conservative	David MacPhee	4,500	13.8	▼1.7	5,654	17.3	▲0.8
Green					1,787	5.5	▲1.5
Liberal Democrats	Jane Liston	1,789	5.5	▲1.0	1,570	4.8	▲1.2
Alba					535	1.6	New
All for Unity					322	1.0	New
Scottish Family	Steve Saunders	385	1.2	New	220	0.7	New
Abolish the Scottish Parliament					113	0.3	New
Freedom Alliance (UK)					106	0.3	New
Scottish Libertarian					68	0.2	0.0
Reform					60	0.2	New
UKIP					41	0.1	▼2.0
Independent	Martin Keatings				24	0.1	New
Renew					11	0.0	New
Independent	Mercy Kamanja				3	0.0	New
Majority		10,234	31.3	▲2.3			
Valid votes		32,670			32,717		
Invalid votes		70			40		
Turnout		32,740	59.9	▲6.1	32,757	59.9	▲6.1
SNP hold		Swing					

=== 2010s ===
2016 Scottish Parliament election: Mid Fife and Glenrothes
Party	Candidate	Constituency			Region		
Party	Candidate	Votes	%	±%	Votes	%	±%
SNP	Jenny Gilruth	15,555	54.5	▲2.2	14,495	50.6	▲0.9
Labour	Kay Morrison	7,279	25.5	▼10.9	6,365	22.2	▼10.8
Conservative	Alex Stewart-Clark	4,427	15.5	▲9.1	4,718	16.5	▲10.0
Green					1,140	4.0	▲2.1
Liberal Democrats	Jane-Ann Liston	1,286	4.5	▲2.1	1,030	3.6	▲1.4
UKIP					603	2.1	▲1.3
Solidarity					121	0.4	▲0.4
RISE					91	0.3	New
Scottish Libertarian					58	0.2	New
Majority		8,276	29.0	▲13.1			
Valid votes		28,547			28,621		
Invalid votes		74			46		
Turnout		28,621	53.8	▲4.6	28,667	53.8	▲4.6
SNP hold		Swing					

2011 Scottish Parliament election: Mid Fife and Glenrothes
Party	Candidate	Constituency			Region		
Party	Candidate	Votes	%	±%	Votes	%	±%
SNP	Tricia Marwick (Note: Incumbent member on the party list, or for another constituency)	13,761	52.3	N/A	13,099	49.7	N/A
Labour	Claire Baker	9,573	36.4	N/A	8,702	33.0	N/A
Conservative	Allan Smith	1,676	6.4	N/A	1,713	6.5	N/A
Scottish Senior Citizens	Jim Parker	673	2.6	N/A	587	2.2	N/A
Liberal Democrats	Callum Leslie	630	2.4	N/A	575	2.2	N/A
Green					493	1.9	N/A
Independent	Andrew Roger				316	1.2	N/A
Socialist Labour					229	0.9	N/A
BNP					210	0.8	N/A
UKIP					205	0.8	N/A
Scottish Socialist					81	0.3	N/A
Scottish Christian					76	0.3	N/A
CPA					54	0.2	N/A
Solidarity					12	0.0	N/A
Majority		4,188	15.9	N/A			
Valid votes		26,313			26,352		
Invalid votes		108			87		
Turnout		26,421	49.2	N/A	26,439	49.2	N/A
SNP win (new seat)							
Notes

Preceded by Galloway and Upper Nithsdale	Constituency or Region represented by the Presiding Officer; 2011-2016	Succeeded by West Scotland

== See also ==
- Glenrothes and Mid Fife (UK Parliament constituency)
