= Central Fife (Scottish Parliament constituency) =

Region or constituency of the Scottish Parliament

- Former county constituency for the Scottish Parliament
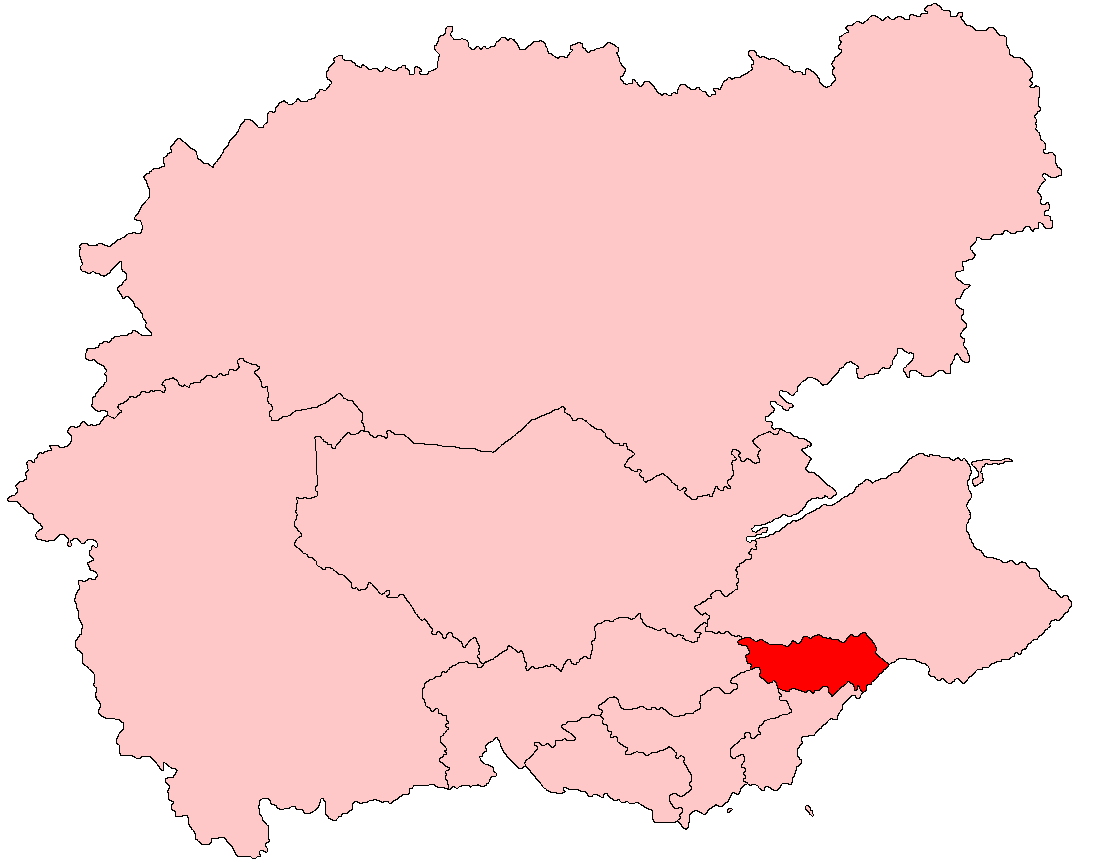

- Central Fife shown within the Mid Scotland and Fife electoral region and the region shown within Scotland

Former constituency
- Created: 1999
- Abolished: 2011
- Council area: Fife

Central Fife was a constituency of the Scottish Parliament. It elected one Member of the Scottish Parliament (MSP) by the plurality (first past the post) method of election. It was also one of nine constituencies in the Mid Scotland and Fife electoral region, which elected seven additional members, in addition to nine constituency MSPs, to produce a form of proportional representation for the region as a whole. From the 2011 Scottish Parliament election Central Fife was redrawn and renamed Mid Fife and Glenrothes.

The former First Minister Henry McLeish represented the constituency from 1999 to 2003.

== Electoral region ==
The other eight initial constituencies of the Mid Scotland and Fife region were; Dunfermline East, Dunfermline West, Fife North East, Kirkcaldy, Ochil, Perth, Stirling and Tayside North. The region covered all of the Clackmannanshire council area, all of the Fife council area, all of the Perth and Kinross council area, all of the Stirling council area and parts of the Angus council area.

== Constituency boundaries and council area ==
The constituency was created at the same time as the Scottish Parliament, in 1999, with the name and boundaries of a pre-existing UK House of Commons constituency. Ahead of the 2005 UK general election, House of Commons constituencies in Scotland were mostly replaced with new constituencies.

The Scottish Parliament constituency of Central Fife was one of five Mid Scotland and Fife constituencies covering the Fife council area, the others being Dunfermline East, Dunfermline West, Fife North East and Kirkcaldy. All were entirely within the council area. Fife Central covered a central portion of the council area, south-west of Fife North East, north of Kirkcaldy, and north-west of Dunfermline East.

== Constituency profile ==
The constituency included the new town of Glenrothes and the industrial ports of Leven and Methil. The main industries in this region were once coal and linoleum, but nowadays Glenrothes is a centre for the electronics and off-shore oil industries.

== Member of the Scottish Parliament ==
Election	Member	Party
1999	Henry McLeish	Labour
2003	Christine May	Labour
2007	Tricia Marwick	Scottish National Party
2011	Constituency abolished; see Mid Fife and Glenrothes	

== Election results ==
2007 Scottish Parliament election: Central Fife
Party	Candidate	Votes	%	±%
SNP	Tricia Marwick	11,920	44.2	+13.6
Labour	Christine May	10,754	39.9	−1.5
Liberal Democrats	Elizabeth Riches	2,288	8.5	+1.8
Conservative	Maurice Golden	2,003	7.4	+0.4
Majority		1,166	4.3	N/A
Turnout		26,965	46.3	+1.9
SNP gain from Labour		Swing	+7.6	

2003 Scottish Parliament election: Central Fife
Party	Candidate	Votes	%	±%
Labour	Christine May	10,591	41.4	−15.9
SNP	Tricia Marwick	7,829	30.6	−0.3
Independent	Andrew Rodger	2,258	8.8	New
Conservative	James North	1,803	7.0	+1.2
Liberal Democrats	Elizabeth Riches	1,725	6.7	+0.8
Scottish Socialist	Morag Balfour	1,391	5.4	New
Majority		2,762	10.8	−15.6
Turnout		25,597	44.4	
Labour hold		Swing	-15.9	

1999 Scottish Parliament election: Central Fife
Party	Candidate	Votes	%	±%
Labour	Henry McLeish	18,828	57.31	N/A
SNP	Tricia Marwick	10,153	30.91	N/A
Liberal Democrats	Jane Ann Liston	1,953	5.94	N/A
Conservative	Keith Harding	1,918	5.84	N/A
Majority		8,675	26.40	N/A
Turnout		32,852		
Labour win (new seat)				

== See also ==
- Central Fife (UK Parliament constituency)

== Footnotes ==
Preceded by Glasgow Anniesland	Constituency represented by the First Minister; 2000–2001	Succeeded by Motherwell and Wishaw
