= Galloway and Upper Nithsdale (UK Parliament constituency) =

UK Parliament constituency (1983–2005)

- Former county constituency for the House of Commons
- Boundary of Galloway and Upper Nithsdale in Scotland for the 2001 general election
- Subdivisions of Scotland: Dumfries and Galloway
- Major settlements: Stranraer, Castle Douglas, Dalbeattie, Kirkcudbright, Newton Stewart

1983–2005
- Seats: 1
- Created from: Galloway and Dumfries
- Replaced by: Dumfries and Galloway

Galloway and Upper Nithsdale was a county constituency which returned one Member of Parliament (MP) to the House of Commons of the Parliament of the United Kingdom, elected by the first past the post voting system.

The constituency was created for the 1983 general election (partly replacing the former Galloway constituency), and abolished for the 2005 general election, when it was replaced by Dumfries and Galloway.

The constituency was notable in being the only seat in all of Scotland won by the Conservative Party at the 2001 general election, and was one of the very few seats that changed hands in that election.

== Boundaries ==
1983–1997: Stewartry District, Wigtown District, and the Nithsdale District electoral divisions of Kirkconnel, Mabie, Mid Nithsdale, and Sanquhar and Queensberry.

1997–2005: Stewartry District, Wigtown District, and the Nithsdale District electoral divisions of Queensberry, Upper Nithsdale, and West Nithsdale.

== Members of Parliament ==
Election	Member	Party	Notes
1983	Ian Lang	Conservative	Member for main predecessor seat (1979–1983); Secretary of State for Scotland (1990–1995); Secretary of State for Trade and Industry (1995–1997)
1997	Alasdair Morgan	SNP	Leader of the SNP in Westminster (1999–2001); Elected to in Scottish Parliament in 1999
2001	Peter Duncan	Conservative	Shadow Secretary of State for Scotland (2003–2005); Contested Dumfries and Galloway following redistribution
2005	constituency abolished: see Dumfries and Galloway		

== Elections ==
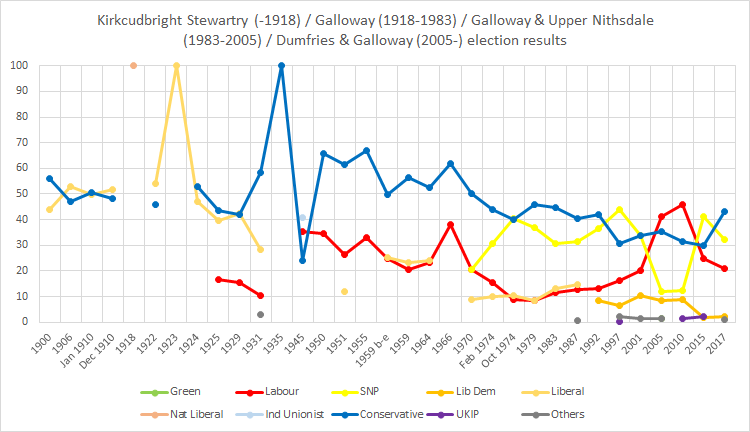
Galloway constituencies election results

=== Elections of the 1980s ===
1979 notional result
Party	Vote	%
Conservative	18,549	45.7
SNP	13,319	32.8
Labour	4,810	11.9
Liberal	3,881	9.6
Turnout	40,559	
Electorate		

General election 1983: Galloway and Upper Nithsdale
Party	Candidate	Votes	%	±%
Conservative	Ian Lang	17,579	44.7	−1.0
SNP	George Thompson	12,118	30.8	−2.0
Liberal	Gerald Douglas	5,129	13.1	+3.5
Labour	Malcolm Miller	4,464	11.4	−0.5
Majority		5,461	13.9	+1.0
Turnout		39,290	75.8	
Registered electors		51,831		
Conservative hold		Swing	+0.5	

General election 1987: Galloway and Upper Nithsdale
Party	Candidate	Votes	%	±%
Conservative	Ian Lang	16,592	40.4	−4.3
SNP	Stephen Norris	12,919	31.5	+0.6
Liberal	John McKercher	6,001	14.6	+1.6
Labour	James Gray	5,298	12.9	+1.5
Independent	Dan Kenny	230	0.6	New
Majority		3,673	8.9	−5.0
Turnout		41,040	76.8	+1.0
Registered electors		53,429		
Conservative hold		Swing	−2.5	

=== Elections of the 1990s ===
General election 1992: Galloway and Upper Nithsdale
Party	Candidate	Votes	%	±%
Conservative	Ian Lang	18,681	42.0	+1.6
SNP	Matt Brown	16,213	36.4	+5.0
Labour	John Dowson	5,766	13.0	+0.1
Liberal Democrats	John McKerchar	3,826	8.6	−6.0
Majority		2,468	5.5	−3.4
Turnout		44,486	81.7	+4.9
Registered electors		54,474		
Conservative hold		Swing	−1.7	

General election 1997: Galloway and Upper Nithsdale
Party	Candidate	Votes	%	±%
SNP	Alasdair Morgan	18,449	43.9	+7.5
Conservative	Ian Lang	12,825	30.5	−11.5
Labour	Katy Clark	6,861	16.3	+3.4
Liberal Democrats	John McKerchar	2,700	6.4	−2.2
Independent	Robert Wood	566	1.3	New
Referendum	Alan Kennedy	428	1.0	New
UKIP	Joseph Smith	189	0.4	New
Majority		5,624	13.4	N/A
Turnout		42,018	79.7	−1.3
Registered electors		52,751		
SNP gain from Conservative		Swing	+9.5	

=== Elections of the 2000s ===
General election 2001: Galloway and Upper Nithsdale
Party	Candidate	Votes	%	±%
Conservative	Peter Duncan	12,222	34.0	+3.5
SNP	Malcolm Fleming	12,148	33.8	−10.1
Labour	Thomas Sloan	7,258	20.2	+3.9
Liberal Democrats	Neil Wallace	3,698	10.3	+3.9
Scottish Socialist	Andy Harvey	588	1.6	New
Majority		74	0.2	N/A
Turnout		35,914	67.4	−12.3
Registered electors		52,756		
Conservative gain from SNP		Swing	+6.8	

== See also ==
- Galloway and Upper Nithsdale (Scottish Parliament constituency)

Parliament of the United Kingdom
Preceded by Moray	Constituency represented by the Leader of the Scottish National Party in Westminster; 1999–2001	Succeeded by Banff and Buchan
