= Galloway and Upper Nithsdale (Scottish Parliament constituency) =

Region or constituency of the Scottish Parliament

- Former county constituency for the Scottish Parliament
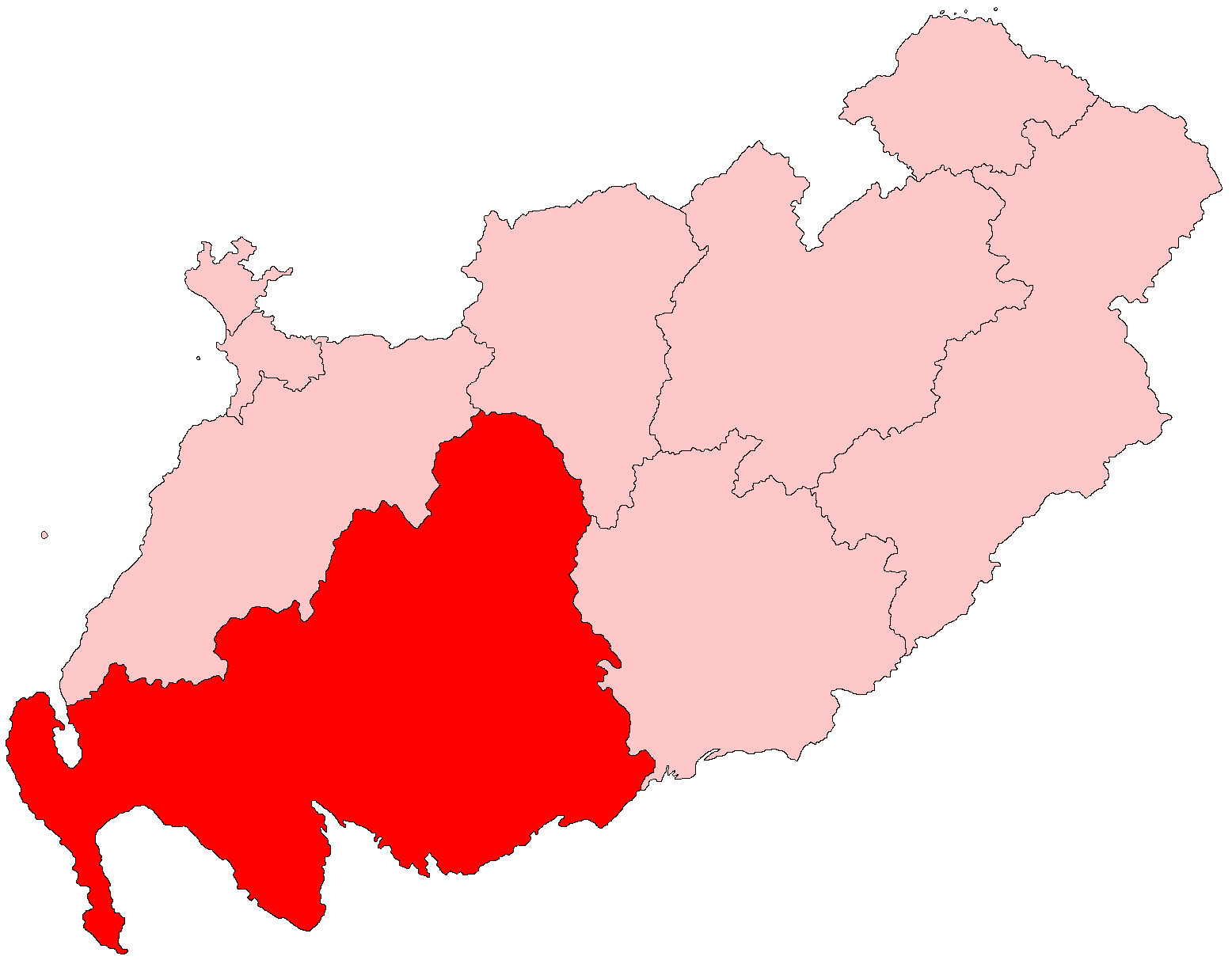

- Galloway and Upper Nithsdale shown within the South of Scotland electoral region and the region shown within Scotland

Former constituency
- Created: 1999
- Abolished: 2011
- Council area: Dumfries and Galloway
- Replaced by: Dumfriesshire, Galloway and West Dumfries

Galloway and Upper Nithsdale was a constituency of the Scottish Parliament (Holyrood). It elected one Member of the Scottish Parliament (MSP) by the plurality (first past the post) method of election. This constituency was abolished for the 2011 election, with 78.4% of the constituency being incorporated into the new Galloway and West Dumfries (Scottish Parliament constituency), with the rest becoming part of the Dumfriesshire (Scottish Parliament constituency).

== Constituency boundaries and council area ==
The Galloway and Upper Nithsdale constituency was created at the same time as the Scottish Parliament, in 1999, with the name and boundaries of an existing Westminster constituency. In 2005, however, Scottish Westminster (House of Commons) constituencies were mostly replaced with new constituencies.

== Member of the Scottish Parliament ==
Alex Fergusson represented the constituency from the 2003 election until its abolition in 2011, having previously been an additional MSP for the South of Scotland region from 1999 to 2003. Originally elected as a Conservative, he was the Presiding Officer of the Scottish Parliament from 2007 to 2011, a post which required him to relinquish party allegiance.

Election	Member	Party
1999	Alasdair Morgan	Scottish National Party
2003	Alex Fergusson	Conservative
2007	Alex Fergusson	Presiding Officer
2011	constituency abolished: replaced by Dumfriesshire, and Galloway and West Dumfries	

== Election results ==
2007 Scottish Parliament election: Galloway and Upper Nithsdale
Party	Candidate	Votes	%	±%
Conservative	Alex Fergusson	13,387	44.2	+6.0
SNP	Alasdair Morgan	10,054	33.2	−4.7
Labour	Stephen Hodgson	4,935	16.3	+1.8
Liberal Democrats	Alastair Cooper	1,631	5.4	−0.8
Independent	Sandy Richardson	311	1.0	New
Majority		3,333	11.0	+10.7
Turnout		31,295		
Conservative hold		Swing		

2003 Scottish Parliament election: Galloway and Upper Nithsdale
Party	Candidate	Votes	%	±%
Conservative	Alex Fergusson	11,332	38.2	+8.0
SNP	Alasdair Morgan	11,233	37.9	−1.4
Labour	Norma Harte	4,299	14.5	−5.9
Liberal Democrats	Neil Wallace	1,847	6.2	−3.9
Scottish Socialist	Joy Cherkaoui	709	2.4	New
Majority		99	0.3	N/A
Turnout		29,420		
Conservative gain from SNP		Swing	+4.6	

1999 Scottish Parliament election: Galloway and Upper Nithsdale
Party	Candidate	Votes	%	±%
SNP	Alasdair Morgan	13,873	39.3	N/A
Conservative	Alex Fergusson	10,672	30.2	N/A
Labour	Jim Stevens	7,209	20.4	N/A
Liberal Democrats	Joan Mitchell	3,562	10.1	N/A
Majority		3,201	9.1	N/A
Turnout		35,316		N/A
SNP win (new seat)				

Preceded by Ochil	Constituency or Region represented by the Presiding Officer; 2007–2011	Succeeded by Mid Fife and Glenrothes

== See also ==
- Galloway and Upper Nithsdale (UK Parliament constituency)
