= Presiding Officer of the Scottish Parliament =

Speaker of the Scottish Parliament

- Scottish Gaelic: Oifigear Riaghlaidh Pàrlamaid na h-Alba; Scots: Preses o the Scots Pairlament
- Logo of the Scottish Parliament

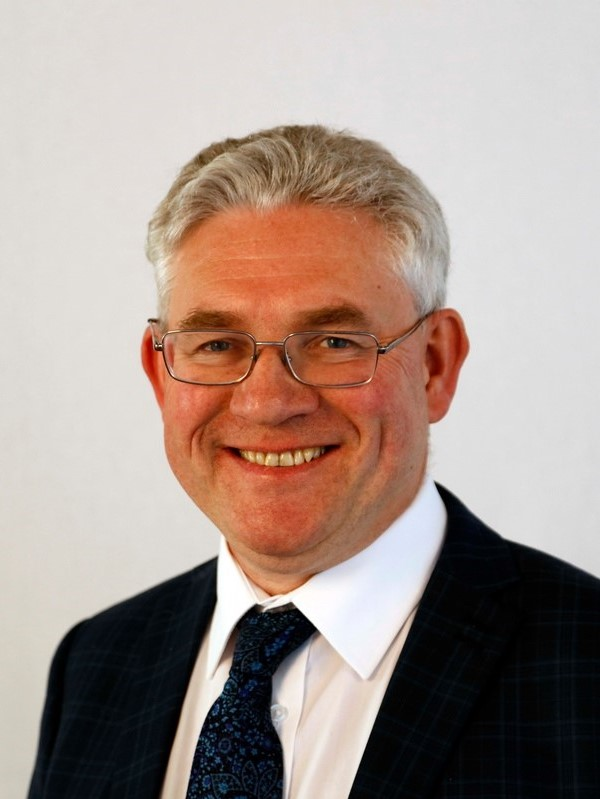
- Incumbent; Kenneth Gibson since 14 May 2026
- Scottish Parliamentary Corporate Body; Scottish Parliament
- Style: Presiding Officer (within Parliament); The Right Honourable (formal)
- Member of: Scottish Parliamentary Corporate Body; Scottish Parliament; Privy Council
- Seat: Queensberry House, Edinburgh
- Nominator: Scottish Parliament (through secret exhaustive ballot voting)
- Appointer: Scottish Parliament (elected by)
- Term length: Elected by the Scottish Parliament at the start of each session, and upon a vacancy
- Inaugural holder: David Steel
- Formation: 1999
- Deputy: Clare Adamson and Katy Clark
- Salary: £130,500 per annum (2025) (including £74,507 MSP salary)
- Website: www.parliament.scot/about/how-parliament-works/parliament-organisations-groups-and-people/presiding-officer-and-deputy-presiding-officers

The presiding officer of the Scottish Parliament (Scottish Gaelic: Oifigear-Riaghlaidh, Scots: Preses) is the speaker of the Scottish Parliament, with the incumbent holder of the office, Kenneth Gibson, elected on 14 May 2026, following the 2026 Scottish Parliament election. The office was established by the Scotland Act 1998, and the elected presiding officer is a member of the Scottish Parliament who is elected by the Scottish Parliament by means of an exhaustive ballot, and is ex officio the head of the Scottish Parliamentary Corporate Body. The presiding officer is considered a figurehead of the Scottish Parliament and has an office in Queensberry House.

== Responsibilities ==
=== Parliamentary ===
The presiding officer presides over the Parliament's debates, determining which members may speak, and maintains order during debate. The presiding officer is expected to be strictly non-partisan, with some similarities in this respect to the tradition of the Speaker of the House of Commons. For this reason, they renounce all affiliation with their former political party for the duration of their term. They do not take part in debate, or vote except to break ties. Even then, the convention is that when the presiding officer uses their tie-breaking vote, they do so in favour of advancing debate, but on final ballots, retaining the status quo. The presiding officer is also assisted in their duties by 2 deputies. They have the same powers as the presiding officer; they keep their party affiliation but remain impartial when presiding.

In 2006 the St Andrews Fund for Scots Heraldry commemorated the hosting of the Heraldic & Genealogical Congress in Scotland by commissioning a ceremonial robe for the presiding officer to wear, however as of May 2017, it appears no presiding officer has worn the robe.

The General section of Section 19 of the Scotland Act 1998 highlight the general functions and responsibilities of the office of Presiding Officer. The Scotland Act 1998 highlights the general responsibilities of the Presiding Officer as being:

- Sections 2, 3 and 9 - recommending to the monarch the date for holding general elections and fixing the dates of by-elections;
- Sections 10 and 14 - receiving notification of a member’s resignation and of the filling of a vacancy in a regional seat;
- Section 21 - membership of the Scottish Parliamentary Corporate Body;
- Section 26 - administering oaths to witnesses before the Parliament;
- Sections 31 to 35 - scrutiny of Bills and submission of Bills for Royal Assent; and
- Sections 45 and 46 - recommending to the monarch the Parliament's choice of First Minister and the appointment of another member to exercise the First Minister's functions in certain circumstances.
- The Standing Orders of the Parliament also provide that the Presiding Officer shall have such other functions as may be conferred upon him or her by the Parliament or by the Standing Orders.

Subsection (1) of Section 19 of the Scotland Act 1998 requires the Parliament following its first meeting after a general election to the Scottish Parliament has taken place, to elect from amongst its membership a Presiding Officer and two deputies. The elections have to take place after members take their oath of allegiance due to the fact that the members cannot take part in any proceedings until they have done so under section 84(2) of the Scotland Act 1998.

=== Representation ===
As well as being the presiding officer and speaker of the Scottish Parliament, the Presiding Officer represents Scotland, the Scottish Government and the Scottish Parliament both within Scotland and during international visits. The Presiding Officer welcomes dignitaries from other national parliaments to study policy issues of the Scottish Government, share information on ways of working as well as exchanging ideas and knowledge. The Presiding Officer, along with other members of the Scottish Parliament, may visit other national parliaments in order to improve understanding on shared interests and developing and strengthening good working relationships.

=== Legal ===
The overall responsibilities and functions of the office of the Presiding Officer of the Scottish Parliament were detailed in the passing of the Scotland Act 1998. The act set out the responsibilities of the office in four areas; Purpose and Effect, General, Parliamentary Consideration and Details of Provisions.

== Election and tenure ==
=== Appointment process ===
The purpose and effect section under Section 19 of the Scotland Act 1998 provides for the election of a Presiding Officer to the Scottish Parliament and requires two deputies to preside over the parliament. It outlines the details for the term of office of the Presiding Officer and deputies; the exercise of the Presiding Officer's functions by a deputy if the Presiding Officer is unable to act or the office of Presiding Officer is vacant, the delegation of the Presiding Officer’s functions to a deputy and participation of the Presiding Officer and deputies in proceedings of the Parliament.

=== Duration of office ===
Subsection (2) of the Section 19 of the Scotland Act 1998 provides for the office holder of either the Presiding Officer or Deputy Presiding Officer to hold office until:

- a new Presiding Officer is elected;
- the Presiding Officer resigns;
- the Presiding Officer ceases to be a member otherwise than by virtue of a dissolution; or
- the incumbent Presiding Officer is removed from office by resolution of the Parliament.

In Law, the Presiding Officer and the deputies will not cease to hold the office of Presiding Officer merely because of the dissolution of the Parliament before a general election. The incumbent office holders will continue to serve office until such time as the new Parliament elects a Presiding Officer (and the deputies) under subsection (1).

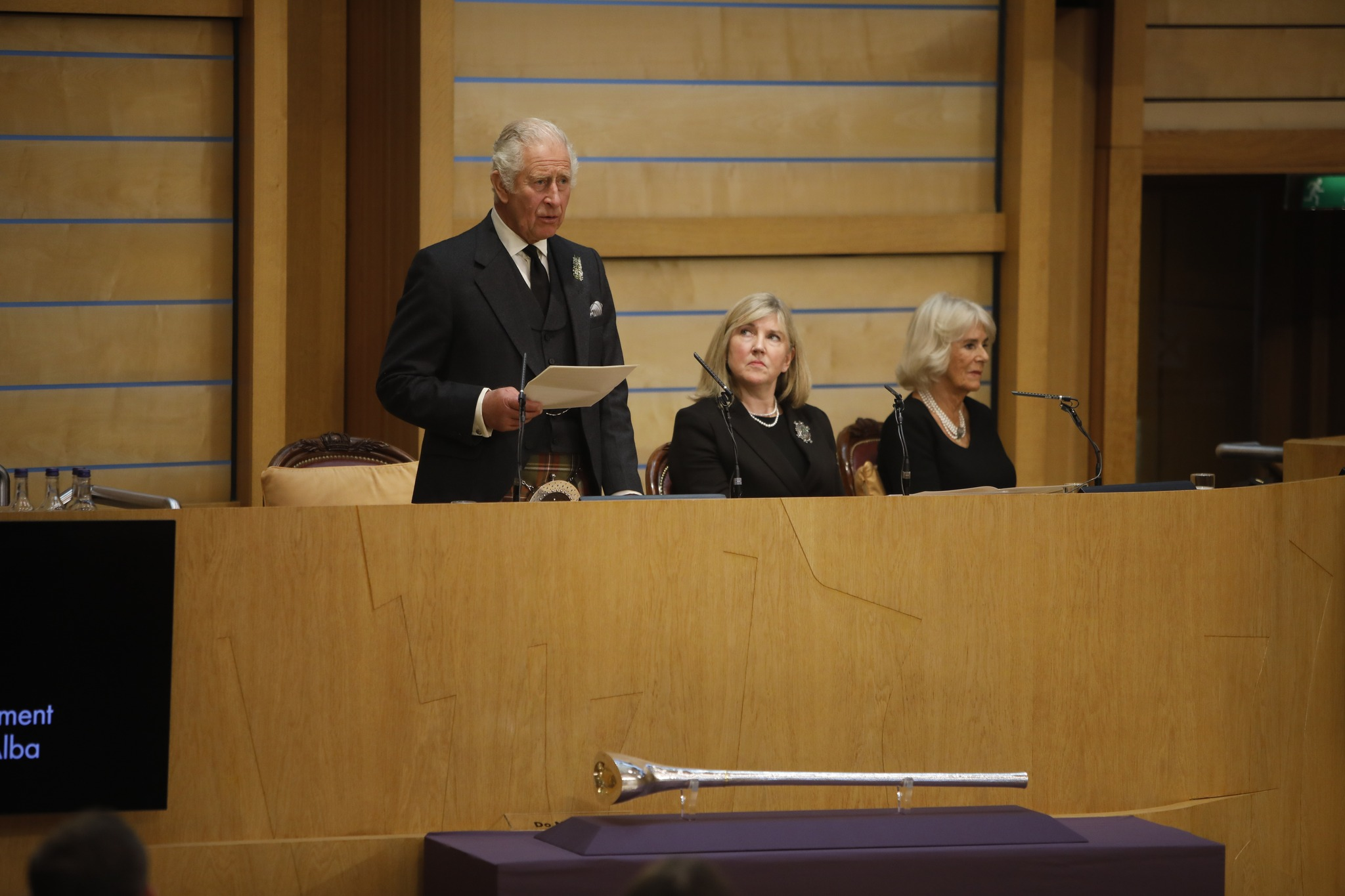
Presiding Officer Alison Johnstone presides over the first speech to the Scottish Parliament by King Charles III

Subsection (3) requires members of the Scottish Parliament to elect a replacement for the Presiding Officer or a deputy who ceases to hold office for any reason before dissolution of the Parliament that may result in the Presiding Officer or a deputy leaving or being removed from the office. Subsection (4) highlights that the Presiding Officer’s functions may be exercised by a deputy if the office is vacant for whatever reason, or alternatively if the Presiding Officer is for any reason unable to act and fulfil the duties of office. Subsection (5) empowers the Presiding Officer, subject to standing orders, to authorise any deputy to exercise functions on their behalf.

Subsection (6) gives the presiding officer the power through standing orders to regulate the participation of the Presiding Officer and deputies in proceedings of the Parliament. They may cover any constraints on the way in which the Presiding Officer and deputies may vote in proceedings which they chair. Subsection (7) provides that the validity of any act of the Presiding Officer or a deputy is not affected by any defect in the election.

=== Future of the role ===
The Scottish National Party proposes that in the event of independence, the presiding officer's post be replaced with that of chancellor of Scotland. In addition to presiding over the Scottish Parliament, the chancellor would possess additional constitutional powers during the absence of the monarch from Scotland; chiefly, the chancellor should act in a role similar to a governor-general in the other Commonwealth realms.

== Office holders ==
=== List of Presiding Officers ===
No.	Portrait	Name (birth and death) Constituency/Region	Start of office	Left office	Former party
1		The Lord Steel of Aikwood (Note: he was known as Sir David Steel in the Scottish Parliament.) (1938–); Member of the House of Lords; MSP for Lothian	12 May 1999	7 May 2003	Scottish Liberal Democrats
2		George Reid (1939–2025) MSP for Ochil	7 May 2003	14 May 2007	Scottish National Party
3		Alex Fergusson (1949–2018) MSP for Galloway and Upper Nithsdale	14 May 2007	11 May 2011	Scottish Conservatives
4		Tricia Marwick (1953–) MSP for Mid Fife and Glenrothes	11 May 2011	12 May 2016	Scottish National Party
5		Ken Macintosh (1962–) MSP for West Scotland	12 May 2016	13 May 2021	Scottish Labour
6		Alison Johnstone (1965–) MSP for Lothian	13 May 2021	14 May 2026	Scottish Greens
7		Kenneth Gibson (1961–) MSP for Cunninghame North	14 May 2026	Incumbent	Scottish National Party

=== List of deputy presiding officers ===
Name Term of office	Party	Constituency / Region	Name Term of office	Party	Constituency / Region
Patricia Ferguson; 12 May 1999 – 27 November 2001	Scottish Labour	Glasgow Maryhill	George Reid; 12 May 1999 – 7 May 2003	Scottish National Party	Mid Scotland and Fife
Murray Tosh; 29 November 2001 – 2 April 2007	Scottish Conservatives	South of Scotland (1999–2003); West of Scotland (2003–2007)	George Reid; 12 May 1999 – 7 May 2003	Scottish National Party	Mid Scotland and Fife
Murray Tosh; 29 November 2001 – 2 April 2007	Scottish Conservatives	South of Scotland (1999–2003); West of Scotland (2003–2007)	Trish Godman; 7 May 2003 – 22 March 2011	Scottish Labour	West Renfrewshire
Alasdair Morgan; 10 May 2007 – 22 March 2011	Scottish National Party	South of Scotland	Trish Godman; 7 May 2003 – 22 March 2011	Scottish Labour	West Renfrewshire
John Scott; 11 May 2011 – 12 May 2016	Scottish Conservatives	Ayr	Elaine Smith; 11 May 2011 – 12 May 2016	Scottish Labour	Coatbridge and Chryston
Linda Fabiani; 12 May 2016 – 12 May 2021	Scottish National Party	East Kilbride	Christine Grahame; 12 May 2016 – 12 May 2021	Scottish National Party	Midlothian South, Tweeddale and Lauderdale
Linda Fabiani; 12 May 2016 – 12 May 2021	Scottish National Party	East Kilbride	Lewis Macdonald (Interim) 1 April 2020 – 12 May 2021	Scottish Labour	North East Scotland
Annabelle Ewing; 14 May 2021 – 14 May 2026	Scottish National Party	Cowdenbeath	Liam McArthur; 14 May 2021 – 14 May 2026	Scottish Liberal Democrats	Orkney
Clare Adamson; 14 May 2026 – present	Scottish National Party	Motherwell and Wishaw	Katy Clark; 14 May 2026 – present	Scottish Labour	West Scotland

=== Incumbent holders ===
Position	Current holder	Term started	Party	Constituency / Region
Presiding Officer of the Scottish Parliament	Kenneth Gibson	14 May 2026	Scottish National Party (Suspended during term as Presiding Officer)	Cunninghame North
Deputy Presiding Officer of the Scottish Parliament	Clare Adamson	14 May 2026	Scottish National Party	Motherwell and Wishaw
Deputy Presiding Officer of the Scottish Parliament	Katy Clark	14 May 2026	Scottish Labour	West Scotland

== List of elections ==
Presiding Officer elections			Votes received		
Parliamentary term	Date	Candidates	1st Round	2nd Round	3rd Round
1st Parliament	31 May 1999	Lord Steel	82		
1st Parliament	31 May 1999	George Reid	44		
2nd Parliament	7 May 2003	George Reid	113		
3rd Parliament	14 May 2007	Alex Fergusson	108		
3rd Parliament	14 May 2007	Margo MacDonald	20		
4th Parliament	11 May 2011	Tricia Marwick	49	73	
4th Parliament	11 May 2011	Hugh Henry	45	56	
4th Parliament	11 May 2011	Christine Grahame	32	Eliminated	
5th Parliament	12 May 2016	Ken Macintosh	58	60	71
5th Parliament	12 May 2016	Murdo Fraser	23	26	31
5th Parliament	12 May 2016	Johann Lamont	23	26	26
5th Parliament	12 May 2016	John Scott	17	15	Eliminated
5th Parliament	12 May 2016	Elaine Smith	7	Eliminated	
6th Parliament	13 May 2021	Alison Johnstone	97		
7th Parliament	14 May 2026	Kenneth Gibson	46	48	74
7th Parliament	14 May 2026	Clare Haughey	42	44	54
7th Parliament	14 May 2026	Liam McArthur	34	36	Eliminated
7th Parliament	14 May 2026	Stuart McMillan	6	Eliminated	

== See also ==
- Presidency of the old Scots Parliament (pre-1707)
- Lord Chancellor of Scotland
- Lord High Commissioner to the Parliament of Scotland
- Presiding Officer (disambiguation page)
- Speaker (politics)
- Preses
- Lord Speaker
- Speaker of the House of Commons (United Kingdom)
- Llywydd of the Senedd
- Speaker of the Northern Ireland Assembly
