= Joseph Gloag =

Scottish political activist and marketing theorist

Professor Joseph Gloag
- Born: 1906 or 1907
- Died: 21 April 1977
- Occupations: Marketing theorist, Political activist
- Office: Treasurer of the Scottish National Party
- Predecessor: George Gibson
- Successor: Michael Murgatroyd
- Political party: SNP

Academic background
- Education: George Heriot's School, University of London

Academic work
- Institutions: Heriot-Watt University, Kwame Nkrumah University of Science and Technology

Joseph Gloag (1906 or 1907 – 21 April 1977) was a marketing theorist and Scottish nationalist political activist.

Gloag studied at George Heriot's School and the University of London before working in Edinburgh, serving as company secretary at a grocers' firm from 1935 until 1952. He later went into academia, with a particular interest in marketing, and was appointed as head of the school of industrial administration at Heriot-Watt College. In 1965, when the college became a university, he was made the first professor of industrial administration at the institution.

Long active in the Liberal Party, Gloag served as the party's secretary in Midlothian in the early 1960s. However, he left the Liberals and instead joined the Scottish National Party (SNP) in 1966, and by 1968 was standing for his new party in local elections in Dalkeith. He then served as treasurer of the SNP, from 1968 to 1970. In 1970, he attracted attention by presenting a "declaration of nationhood" for Scotland to the United Nations, which had been drawn up by the SNP.

Gloag retired from the university in 1972, and took up a two-year posting as Professor of Economics and Industrial Management at the University of Science and Technology, Kumasi.

Party political offices
Preceded by George Gibson	Treasurer of the Scottish National Party; 1968–1970	Succeeded by Michael Murgatroyd
