= Strathcarron Hospice =

Geography
- Location: Forth Valley and North Lanarkshire, Scotland, United Kingdom
- Coordinates: 56°1′28.26″N 3°56′20.88″W

Organisation
- Type: Hospice

History
- Opened: 1981

Links
- Website: Strathcarron Hospice
- Lists: Hospitals in Scotland

Strathcarron Hospice is a free palliative care resource in Denny, Scotland, serving people in the Forth Valley and North Lanarkshire areas.

It was established in 1981 by Dr. Harold Lyon and friends, and cares for patients with an active, life-limiting disease. It relies heavily on volunteers and fundraising to provide its service.
