= Ochil (Scottish Parliament constituency) =

Region or constituency of the Scottish Parliament

- Former county constituency for the Scottish Parliament
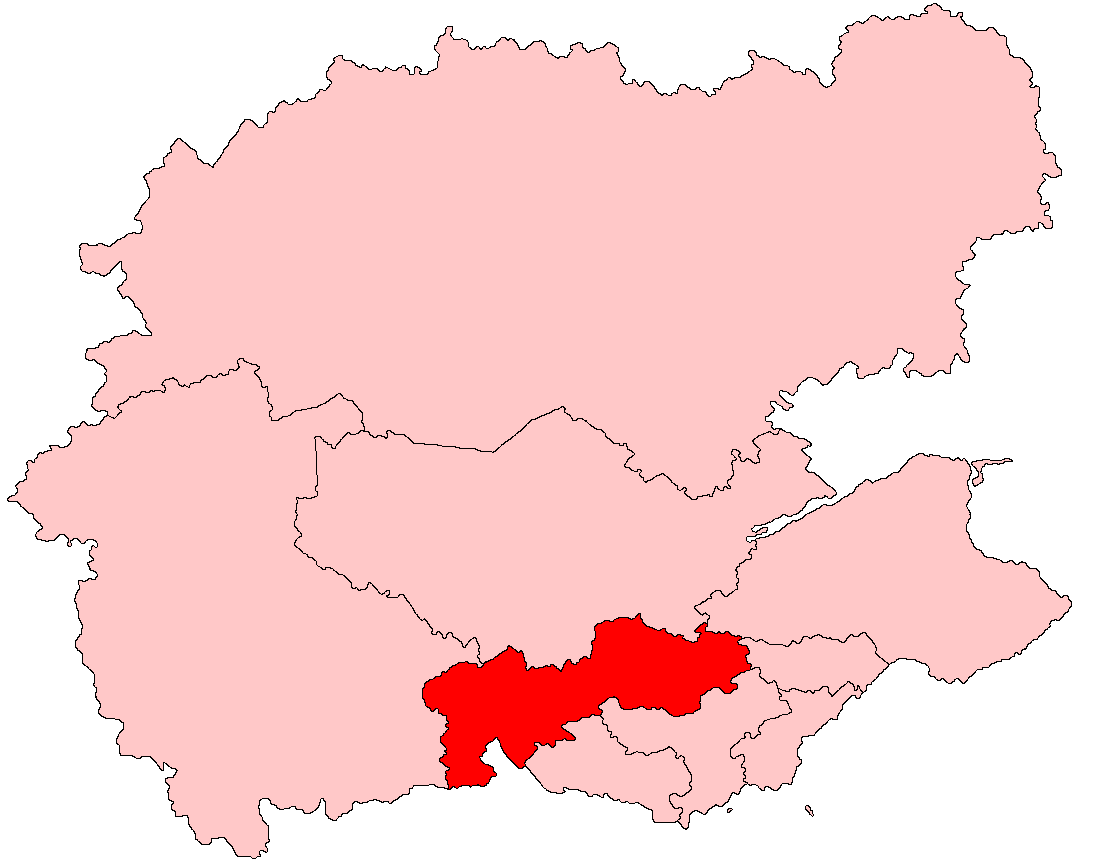

- Ochil shown within the Mid Scotland and Fife electoral region and the region shown within Scotland

Former constituency
- Created: 1999
- Abolished: 2011
- Council area: Clackmannanshire; Perth and Kinross (part)

Ochil was a constituency of the Scottish Parliament. It elected one Member of the Scottish Parliament (MSP) by the plurality (first past the post) method of election. Also, it was one of nine constituencies in the Mid Scotland and Fife electoral region, which elected seven additional members, in addition to the nine constituency MSPs, to produce a form of proportional representation for the region as a whole.

The former Presiding Officer of the Scottish Parliament George Reid represented the constituency from 2003 to 2007.

For the Scottish Parliament election, 2011, Ochil was abolished, with the majority of the seat forming the newly created Clackmannanshire and Dunblane seat.

== Electoral region ==
The region covered all of the Clackmannanshire council area, all of the Fife council area, all of the Perth and Kinross council area, all of the Stirling council area and parts of the Angus council area.

== Constituency boundaries and council areas ==
The constituency was created at the same time as the Scottish Parliament, in 1999, with the name and boundaries of a pre-existing UK House of Commons constituency. Ahead of the 2005 United Kingdom general election Scottish Westminster constituencies were mostly replaced with new constituencies. The Ochil Westminster constituency, was divided between the Ochil and South Perthshire Westminster constituency and the Stirling Westminster constituency.

From the Scottish Parliament election, 2011, Ochil was largely replaced by an expanded constituency of Clackmannanshire and Dunblane.

== Constituency profile ==
Although a county constituency, Ochil was mostly industrial in character, with the main industries of the region being brewing, distilling, glass production, bottling, tourism and agriculture. The majority of the constituency's inhabitants were working-class. There are however affluent areas, including Bridge of Allan, home to wealthy commuters to the city of Stirling and further afield; Dollar, which has, in its Academy, one of Scotland's most renowned private schools; and rural Kinross.

== Member of the Scottish Parliament ==
Election	Member	Party
1999	Richard Simpson	Labour
2003	George Reid	Scottish National Party
2003	George Reid	Presiding Officer
2007	Keith Brown	Scottish National Party
2011	Constituency abolished: see Clackmannanshire and Dunblane	

== Election results ==
2007 Scottish Parliament election: Ochil
Party	Candidate	Votes	%	±%
SNP	Keith Brown	12,147	38.5	+0.2
Labour	Brian Fearon	11,657	36.9	−0.5
Conservative	George Murray	4,284	13.6	+3.9
Liberal Democrats	Lorraine Caddell	3,465	11.0	+2.7
Majority		490	1.6	+0.7
Turnout		31,553	54.9	+0.2
SNP hold		Swing	+0.4	

2003 Scottish Parliament election: Ochil
Party	Candidate	Votes	%	±%
SNP	George Reid	11,659	38.3	+0.1
Labour	Richard Simpson	11,363	37.4	−4.3
Conservative	Malcolm Parkin	2,946	9.7	−1.6
Liberal Democrats	Catherine Whittingham	2,536	8.3	−0.5
Scottish Socialist	Felicity Garvie	1,102	3.6	New
Monster Raving Loony	Flash Gordon Approaching	432	1.4	New
Independent	William Whyte	378	1.2	New
Majority		296	0.9	N/A
Turnout		30,416	54.7	
SNP gain from Labour		Swing	+4.5	

1999 Scottish Parliament election: Ochil
Party	Candidate	Votes	%	±%
Labour	Richard Simpson	15,385	41.7	N/A
SNP	George Reid	14,082	38.2	N/A
Conservative	Nick Johnston	4,151	11.3	N/A
Liberal Democrats	The Earl of Mar & Kellie	3,249	8.8	N/A
Majority		1,301	3.5	N/A
Turnout		36,867		N/A
Labour win (new seat)				

Note: Although George Reid was elected as a Scottish National Party candidate in 2003, he became independent the same year, as the Presiding Officer of the Scottish Parliament.

Preceded by Lothians	Constituency or Region represented by the Presiding Officer; 2003 – 2007	Succeeded by Galloway and Upper Nithsdale
