= Clive Needle =

British politician (born 1956)

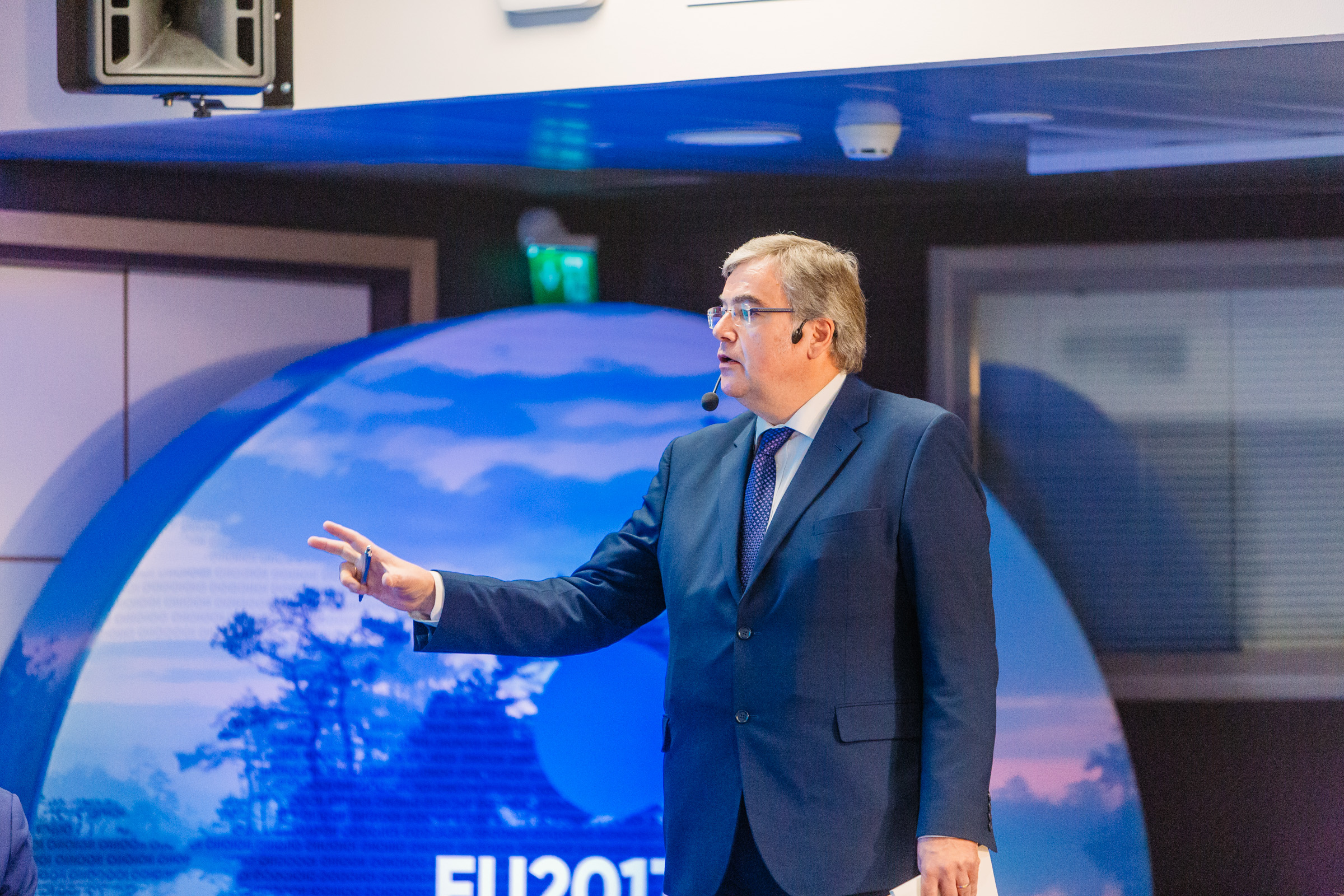
Clive Needle

Clive Needle (born 22 September 1956 in Romford, Essex) is a former Labour Party politician in the United Kingdom. He was the Member of the European Parliament (MEP) for Norfolk from 1994 to 1999.

Born in Romford, Needled was educated at Southend High School and then at Aston University. He became an organiser for the Labour Party in Norfolk, and also served as a community councillor.

== Political life ==
Having stood for election using the campaign slogan, "Be sharp - vote Needle!", Needle was elected as MEP for Norfolk in 1994, defeating the three-term Conservative incumbent Paul Howell, son of Ralph Howell the then Conservative MP for North Norfolk which was in the Norfolk European constituency. He stood again unsuccessfully for election in 1999 and in 2004, standing for the East of England constituency.

During his time in the European Parliament, Needle was a member of the Committee on Development and Cooperation and later the Committee on the Environment, Public Health, and Consumer Protection. He also served as vice chairman of the delegation for relations with Transcaucasus.

== Life since the European Parliament ==
Needle is Senior Policy Advisor for EuroHealthNet, a non-profit organisation promoting health equity in Europe. He lives partly in Brussels and partly in England with his family.
