= List of MPs elected in the 1983 United Kingdom general election =

1983–1987 Parliament of the United Kingdom
←	1979–1983 Parliament	1987–1992 Parliament	→
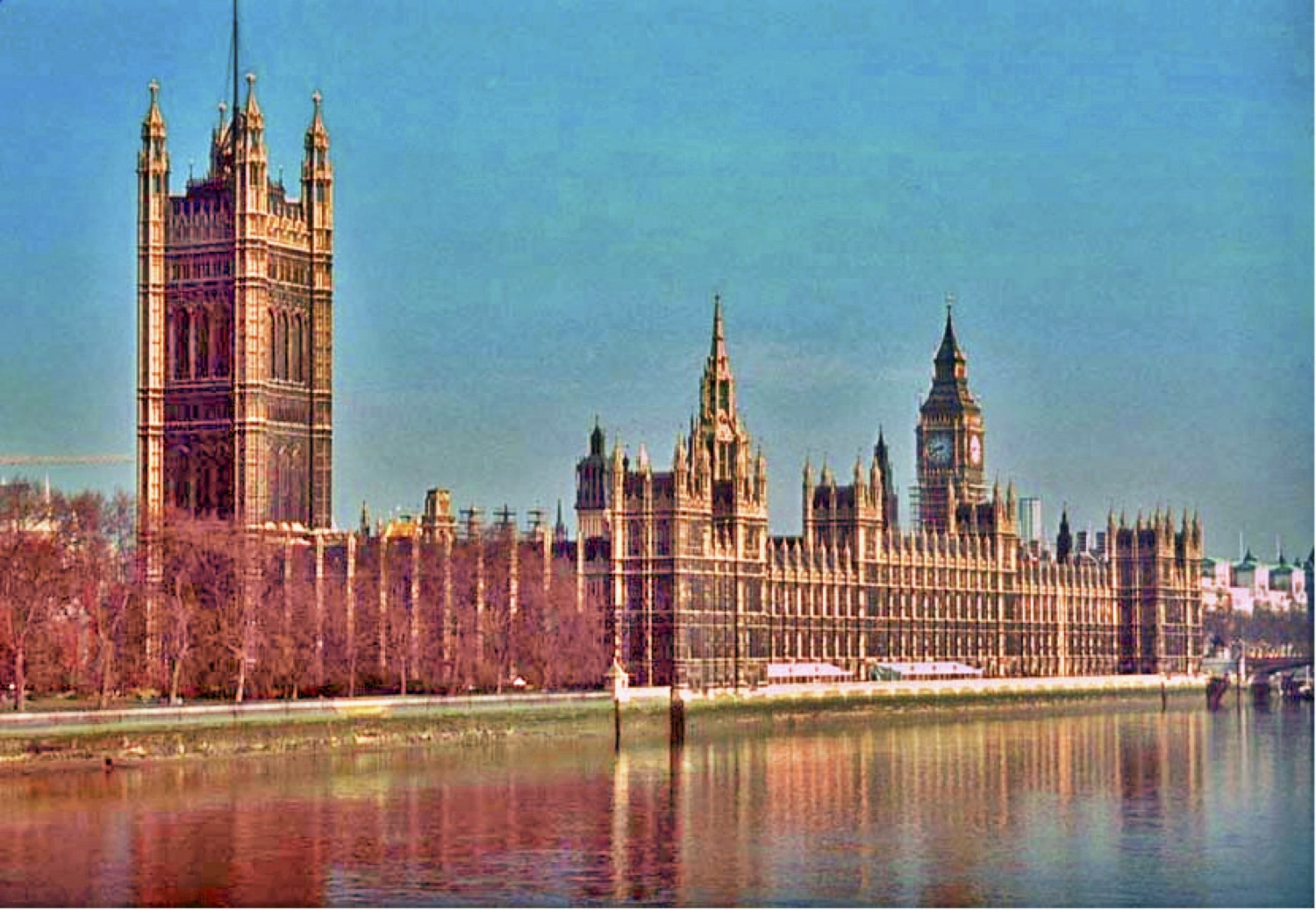
- Palace of Westminster in 1983

Overview
- Legislative body: Parliament of the United Kingdom
- Term: 9 June 1983 – 11 June 1987
- Election: 1983 United Kingdom general election
- Government: Second Thatcher ministry

House of Commons
- Members: 650
- Speaker: Bernard Weatherill
- Leader: John Biffen
- Prime Minister: Margaret Thatcher
- Leader of the Opposition: Michael Foot; Neil Kinnock
- Third-party leader: David Steel & Roy Jenkins

House of Lords
- Lord Chancellor: Baron Hailsham of St Marylebone

Crown-in-Parliament Elizabeth II

Sessions
- 1st: 15 June 1983 – 31 October 1984
- 2nd: 6 November 1984 – 30 October 1985
- 3rd: 6 November 1985 – 7 November 1986
- 4th: 12 November 1986 – 15 May 1987

This is a list of members of Parliament (MPs) elected in the 1983 general election, held on 9 June. This Parliament was dissolved in 1987.

During 1983–1987 Bernard Weatherill was the speaker, Margaret Thatcher served as Prime Minister, Michael Foot and Neil Kinnock served as Leaders of the Opposition.

== Composition ==
These representative diagrams show the composition of the parties in the 1983 general election.

Note: The Scottish National Party and Plaid Cymru sit together as a party group, while Sinn Féin has not taken its seats. This is not the official seating plan of the House of Commons, which has five rows of benches on each side, with the government party to the right of the speaker and opposition parties to the left, but with room for only around two-thirds of MPs to sit at any one time.

Affiliation	Members
Conservative Party	397
Labour Party	209
SDP–Liberal Alliance	23 (6 + 17)
Ulster Unionist Party	11
Democratic Unionist Party	3
Plaid Cymru	2
Scottish National Party	2
Social Democratic and Labour Party	1
Sinn Féin	1
Ulster Popular Unionist Party	1
Total	650
Notional Government Majority	144
Effective Government Majority	151

Table of contents:

A B C D E F G H I J K L M N O P Q R S T U V W X Y Z By-elections

Constituency	MP	Party
=== A ===
Aberavon	John Morris	Labour Party
Aberdeen, North	Robert Hughes	Labour Party
Aberdeen, South	Gerald Malone	Conservative party
Aldershot	Julian Critchley	Conservative party
Aldridge-Brownhills	Richard Shepherd	Conservative Party
Altrincham and Sale	Fergus Montgomery	Conservative Party
Alyn and Deeside	Barry Jones	Labour Party
Amber Valley	Phillip Oppenheim	Conservative Party
Angus East	Peter Fraser	Conservative party
Antrim, East	Roy Beggs	Official Unionist
Antrim, North	Ian Paisley	Democratic Unionist
Antrim, South	Clifford Forsythe	Official Unionist
Argyll and Bute	John MacKay	Conservative party
Arundel	Michael Marshall	Conservative party
Ashfield	Frank Haynes	Labour party
Ashford	Keith Speed	Conservative party
Ashton-under-Lyne	Robert Sheldon	Labour party
Aylesbury	Timothy Raison	Conservative Party
Ayr	George Younger	Conservative Party
=== B ===
Banbury	Tony Baldry	Conservative Party
Banff and Buchan	Albert McQuarrie	Conservative Party
Barking	Jo Richardson	Labour Party
Barnsley, Central	Roy Mason	Labour Party
Barnsley, East	Terry Patchett	Labour Party
Barnsley, West and Penistone	Allen McKay	Labour Party
Barrow and Furness	Cecil Franks	Conservative Party
Basildon	David Amess	Conservative Party
Basingstoke	Andrew Hunter	Conservative Party
Bassetlaw	Joe Ashton	Labour Party
Bath	Chris Patten	Conservative Party
Batley and Spen	Elizabeth Peacock	Conservative Party
Battersea	Alfred Dubs	Labour Party
Beaconsfield	Tim Smith	Conservative Party
Beckenham	Philip Goodhart	Conservative Party
Bedfordshire, Mid	Nicholas Lyell	Conservative Party
Bedfordshire, North	Trevor Skeet	Conservative Party
Bedfordshire, South West	David Madel	Conservative Party
Belfast, East	Peter Robinson	Democratic Unionist Party
Belfast, North	Cecil Walker	Official Unionist
Belfast, South	Martin Smyth	Official Unionist
Belfast, West	Gerry Adams	Sinn Féin
Berkshire, East	Andrew MacKay	Conservative Party
Berwick-upon-Tweed	Alan Beith	Liberal Party
Bethnal Green and Stepney	Peter Shore	Labour Party
Beverley	Patrick Wall	Conservative Party
Bexhill and Battle	Charles Wardle	Conservative Party
Bexleyheath	Cyril Townsend	Conservative Party
Billericay	Harvey Proctor	Conservative Party
Birkenhead	Frank Field	Labour Party
Birmingham, Edgbaston	Jill Knight	Conservative Party
Birmingham, Erdington	Robin Corbett	Labour Party
Birmingham, Hall Green	Reginald Eyre	Conservative Party
Birmingham, Hodge Hill	Terence Davis	Labour Party
Birmingham, Ladywood	Clare Short	Labour Party
Birmingham, Northfield	Roger King	Conservative Party
Birmingham, Perry Barr	Jeff Rooker	Labour Party
Birmingham, Selly Oak	Anthony Beaumont-Dark	Conservative Party
Birmingham, Small Heath	Denis Howell	Labour Party
Birmingham, Sparkbrook	Roy Hattersley	Labour Party
Birmingham, Yardley	David Bevan	Conservative Party
Bishop Auckland	Derek Foster	Labour Party
Blaby	Nigel Lawson	Conservative Party
Blackburn	Jack Straw	Labour Party
Blackpool, North	Norman Miscampbell	Conservative Party
Blackpool, South	Peter Blaker	Conservative Party
Blaenau Gwent	Michael Foot	Labour Party
Blaydon	John McWilliam	Labour Party
Blyth Valley	John Ryman	Labour Party
Bolsover	Dennis Skinner	Labour Party
Bolton, North East	Peter Thurnham	Conservative Party
Bolton, South East	David Young	Labour Party
Bolton, West	Tom Sackville	Conservative Party
Boothferry	Paul Bryan	Conservative Party
Bootle	Allan Roberts	Labour Party
Bosworth	Adam Butler	Conservative Party
Bournemouth, East	David Atkinson	Conservative Party
Bournemouth, West	John Butterfill	Conservative Party
Bow and Poplar	Ian Mikardo	Labour Party
Bradford, North	Geoffrey Lawler	Conservative Party
Bradford, South	Thomas Torney	Labour Party
Bradford, West	Max Madden	Labour Party
Braintree	Anthony Newton	Conservative Party
Brecon and Radnor	Tom Hooson	Conservative Party
Brent, East	Reginald Freeson	Labour Party
Brent, North	Rhodes Boyson	Conservative Party
Brent, South	Laurence Pavitt	Labour Co-operative
Brentford and Isleworth	Barney Hayhoe	Conservative Party
Brentwood and Ongar	Robert McCrindle	Conservative Party
Bridgend	Peter Hubbard-Miles	Conservative Party
Bridgwater	Tom King	Conservative Party
Bridlington	John Townend	Conservative Party
Brigg and Cleethorpes	Michael Brown	Conservative Party
Brighton, Kemptown	Andrew Bowden	Conservative Party
Brighton, Pavilion	Julian Amery	Conservative Party
Bristol, East	Jonathan Sayeed	Conservative Party
Bristol, North West	Michael Stern	Conservative Party
Bristol, South	Michael Cocks	Labour Party
Bristol, West	William Waldegrave	Conservative Party
Bromsgrove	Hal Miller	Conservative Party
Broxbourne	Marion Roe	Conservative Party
Broxtowe	Jim Lester	Conservative Party
Buckingham	George Walden	Conservative Party
Burnley	Peter Pike	Labour Party
Burton	Ivan Lawrence	Conservative Party
Bury, North	Alistair Burt	Conservative Party
Bury, South	David Sumberg	Conservative Party
Bury St Edmunds	Eldon Griffiths	Conservative Party
=== C ===
Caernarfon	Dafydd Wigley	Plaid Cymru
Caerphilly	Ron Davies	Labour
Caithness and Sutherland	Bob Maclennan	Social Democrat
Calder Valley	Donald Thompson	Conservative
Cambridge	Robert Rhodes James	Conservative
Cambridgeshire, North East	Clement Freud	Liberal
Cambridgeshire, South East	Francis Pym	Conservative
Cambridgeshire, South West	Anthony Grant	Conservative
Cannock and Burntwood	Gerald Howarth	Conservative
Canterbury	David Crouch	Conservative
Cardiff, Central	Ian Grist	Conservative
Cardiff, North	Gwilym Jones	Conservative
Cardiff, South and Penarth	James Callaghan	Labour
Cardiff, West	Stefan Terlezki	Conservative
Carlisle	Ronald Lewis	Labour
Carmarthen	Roger Thomas	Labour
Carrick, Cumnock and Doon Valley	George Foulkes	Labour Co-operative
Carshalton and Wallington	Nigel Forman	Conservative
Castle Point	Bernard Braine	Conservative
Ceredigion and Pembroke North	Geraint Howells	Liberal
Cheadle	Tom Normanton	Conservative
Chelmsford	Norman St John-Stevas	Conservative
Chelsea	Nicholas Scott	Conservative
Cheltenham	Charles Irving	Conservative
Chertsey and Walton	Geoffrey Pattie	Conservative
Chesham and Amersham	Ian Gilmour	Conservative
Chester, City of	Peter Morrison	Conservative
Chesterfield	Eric Varley	Labour
Chichester	Anthony Nelson	Conservative
Chingford	Norman Tebbit	Conservative
Chipping Barnet	Sydney Chapman	Conservative
Chislehurst	Roger Sims	Conservative
Chorley	Den Dover	Conservative
Christchurch	Robert Adley	Conservative
Cirencester and Tewkesbury	Nicholas Ridley	Conservative
City of London and Westminster South	Peter Brooke	Conservative
Clackmannan	Martin O'Neill	Labour
Clwyd, North West	Anthony Meyer	Conservative
Clwyd, South West	Robert Harvey	Conservative
Clydebank and Milngavie	Hugh McCartney	Labour
Clydesdale	Judith Hart	Labour
Colchester, North	Antony Buck	Conservative
Colchester, South and Maldon	John Wakeham	Conservative
Colne Valley	Richard Wainwright	Liberal
Congleton	Ann Winterton	Conservative
Conwy	Wyn Roberts	Conservative
Copeland	Jack Cunningham	Labour
Corby	William Powell	Conservative
Cornwall, North	Gerry Neale	Conservative
Cornwall, South East	Robert Hicks	Conservative
Coventry, North East	George Park	Labour
Coventry, North West	Geoffrey Robinson	Labour
Coventry, South East	David Nellist	Labour
Coventry, South West	John Butcher	Conservative
Crawley	Nicholas Soames	Conservative
Crewe and Nantwich	Gwyneth Dunwoody	Labour
Crosby	Malcolm Thornton	Conservative
Croydon, Central	John Moore	Conservative
Croydon, North East	Bernard Weatherill	Conservative
Croydon, North West	Humfrey Malins	Conservative
Croydon, South	William Clark	Conservative
Cumbernauld and Kilsyth	Norman Hogg	Labour
Cunninghame, North	John Corrie	Conservative
Cunninghame, South	David Lambie	Labour
Cynon Valley	Ioan Evans	Labour Co-operative
=== D ===
Dagenham	Bryan Gould	Labour
Darlington	Michael Fallon	Conservative
Dartford	Bob Dunn	Conservative
Daventry	Reginald Prentice	Conservative
Davyhulme	Winston Churchill	Conservative
Delyn	Keith Raffan	Conservative
Denton and Reddish	Andrew Bennett	Labour
Derby, North	Gregory Knight	Conservative
Derby, South	Margaret Beckett	Labour
Derbyshire, North East	Raymond Ellis	Labour
Derbyshire, South	Edwina Currie	Conservative
Derbyshire, West	Matthew Parris	Conservative
Devizes	Charles Morrison	Conservative
Devon, North	Tony Speller	Conservative
Devon, West and Torridge	Peter Mills	Conservative
Dewsbury	John Whitfield	Conservative
Doncaster, Central	Harold Walker	Labour
Doncaster, North	Michael Welsh	Labour
Don Valley	Martin Redmond	Labour
Dorset, North	Nicholas Baker	Conservative
Dorset, South	Robert Gascoyne-Cecil	Conservative
Dorset, West	Jim Spicer	Conservative
Dover	Peter Rees	Conservative
Down, North	James Kilfedder	Ulster Popular Unionist
Down, South	Enoch Powell	Official Unionist
Dudley, East	John Gilbert	Labour
Dudley, West	John Blackburn	Conservative
Dulwich	Gerald Bowden	Conservative
Dumbarton	Ian Campbell	Labour
Dumfries	Hector Monro	Conservative
Dundee, East	Gordon Wilson	Scottish National Party
Dundee, West	Ernie Ross	Labour
Dunfermline, East	Gordon Brown	Labour
Dunfermline, West	Dick Douglas	Labour Co-operative
Durham, City of	Mark Hughes	Labour
Durham, North	Giles Radice	Labour
Durham, North West	Ernest Armstrong	Labour
=== E ===
Ealing, Acton	George Young	Conservative
Ealing, North	Harry Greenway	Conservative
Ealing, Southall	Syd Bidwell	Labour
Easington	Jack Dormand	Labour
Eastbourne	Ian Gow	Conservative
East Kilbride	Maurice Miller	Labour
Eastleigh	David Price	Conservative
East Lindsey	Peter Tapsell	Conservative
East Lothian	John Home Robertson	Labour
Eastwood	Allan Stewart	Conservative
Eccles	Lewis Carter-Jones	Labour
Eddisbury	Alastair Goodlad	Conservative
Edinburgh, Central	Alexander Fletcher	Conservative
Edinburgh, East	Gavin Strang	Labour
Edinburgh, Leith	Ron Brown	Labour
Edinburgh, Pentlands	Malcolm Rifkind	Conservative
Edinburgh, South	Michael Ancram	Conservative
Edinburgh, West	James Douglas-Hamilton	Conservative
Edmonton	Ian Twinn	Conservative
Ellesmere Port and Neston	Mike Woodcock	Conservative
Elmet	Spencer Batiste	Conservative
Eltham	Peter Bottomley	Conservative
Enfield, North	Tim Eggar	Conservative
Enfield, Southgate	Anthony Berry	Conservative
Epping Forest	John Biggs-Davison	Conservative
Epsom & Ewell	Archie Hamilton	Conservative
Erewash	Peter Rost	Conservative
Erith and Crayford	David Evennett	Conservative
Esher	Carol Mather	Conservative
Exeter	John Hannam	Conservative
=== F ===
Falkirk, East	Harry Ewing	Labour
Falkirk, West	Dennis Canavan	Labour
Falmouth and Camborne	David Mudd	Conservative
Fareham	Peter Lloyd	Conservative
Faversham	Roger Moate	Conservative
Feltham and Heston	Patrick Ground	Conservative
Fermanagh & South Tyrone	Kenneth Maginnis	Official Unionist
Fife, Central	Willie Hamilton	Labour
Fife, North East	Barry Henderson	Conservative
Finchley	Margaret Thatcher	Conservative
Folkestone and Hythe	Michael Howard	Conservative
Foyle	John Hume	Social Democratic and Labour
Fulham	Martin Stevens	Conservative
Fylde	Edward Gardner	Conservative
=== G ===
Gainsborough and Horncastle	Edward Leigh	Conservative
Galloway and Upper Nithsdale	Ian Lang	Conservative
Gateshead, East	Bernard Conlan	Labour
Gedling	Philip Holland	Conservative
Gillingham	James Couchman	Conservative
Glanford and Scunthorpe	Richard Hickmet	Conservative
Glasgow, Cathcart	John Maxton	Labour
Glasgow, Central	Bob McTaggart	Labour
Glasgow, Garscadden	Donald Dewar	Labour
Glasgow, Govan	Bruce Millan	Labour
Glasgow, Hillhead	Roy Jenkins	Social Democrat
Glasgow, Maryhill	James Craigen	Labour Co-operative
Glasgow, Pollok	James White	Labour
Glasgow, Provan	Hugh Brown	Labour
Glasgow, Rutherglen	Gregor Mackenzie	Labour
Glasgow, Shettleston	David Marshall	Labour
Glasgow, Springburn	Michael Martin	Labour
Gloucester	Sally Oppenheim	Conservative
Gloucestershire, West	Paul Marland	Conservative
Gordon	Malcolm Bruce	Liberal
Gosport	Peter Viggers	Conservative
Gower	Gareth Wardell	Labour
Grantham	Douglas Hogg	Conservative
Gravesham	Timothy Brinton	Conservative
Great Grimsby	Austin Mitchell	Labour
Great Yarmouth	Michael Carttiss	Conservative
Greenock and Port Glasgow	Norman Godman	Labour
Greenwich	Guy Barnett	Labour
Guildford	David Howell	Conservative
=== H ===
Hackney, North and Stoke Newington	Ernest Roberts	Labour
Hackney, South and Shoreditch	Brian Sedgemore	Labour
Halesowen and Stourbridge	John Stokes	Conservative
Halifax	Roy Galley	Conservative
Halton	Gordon Oakes	Labour
Hamilton	George Robertson	Labour
Hammersmith	Clive Soley	Labour
Hampshire, East	Michael Mates	Conservative
Hampshire, North West	David Mitchell	Conservative
Hampstead and Highgate	Geoffrey Finsberg	Conservative
Harborough	John Farr	Conservative
Harlow	Jerry Hayes	Conservative
Harrogate	Robert Banks	Conservative
Harrow, East	Hugh Dykes	Conservative
Harrow, West	John Page	Conservative
Hartlepool	Ted Leadbitter	Labour
Harwich	Julian Ridsdale	Conservative
Hastings and Rye	Kenneth Warren	Conservative
Havant	Ian Lloyd	Conservative
Hayes and Harlington	Terry Dicks	Conservative
Hazel Grove	Tom Arnold	Conservative
Hemsworth	Alec Woodall	Labour
Hendon, North	John Gorst	Conservative
Hendon, South	Peter Thomas	Conservative
Henley	Michael Heseltine	Conservative
Hereford	Colin Shepherd	Conservative
Hertford and Stortford	Bowen Wells	Conservative
Hertfordshire, North	Ian Stewart	Conservative
Hertfordshire, South West	Richard Page	Conservative
Hertfordshire, West	Robert Jones	Conservative
Hertsmere	Cecil Parkinson	Conservative
Hexham	Geoffrey Rippon	Conservative
Heywood and Middleton	James Callaghan	Labour
High Peak	Christopher Hawkins	Conservative
Holborn and St Pancras	Frank Dobson	Labour
Holland with Boston	Richard Body	Conservative
Honiton	Peter Emery	Conservative
Hornchurch	Robin Squire	Conservative
Hornsey and Wood Green	Hugh Rossi	Conservative
Horsham	Peter Hordern	Conservative
Houghton and Washington	Roland Boyes	Labour
Hove	Tim Sainsbury	Conservative
Huddersfield	Barry Sheerman	Labour Co-operative
Huntingdon	John Major	Conservative
Hyndburn	Ken Hargreaves	Conservative
=== I ===
Ilford, North	Vivian Bendall	Conservative
Ilford, South	Neil Thorne	Conservative
Inverness, Nairn and Lochaber	Russell Johnston	Liberal
Ipswich	Kenneth Weetch	Labour
Isle of Wight	Stephen Ross	Liberal
Islington, North	Jeremy Corbyn	Labour
Islington, South and Finsbury	Chris Smith	Labour
Islwyn	Neil Kinnock	Labour
=== J ===
Jarrow	Donald Dixon	Labour
=== K ===
Keighley	Gary Waller	Conservative
Kensington	Brandon Rhys-Williams	Conservative
Kent, Mid	Andrew Rowe	Conservative
Kettering	Roger Freeman	Conservative
Kilmarnock and Loudoun	William McKelvey	Labour
Kincardine and Deeside	Alick Buchanan-Smith	Conservative
Kingston upon Hull East	John Prescott	Labour
Kingston upon Hull North	Kevin McNamara	Labour
Kingston upon Hull West	Stuart Randall	Labour
Kingston-upon-Thames	Norman Lamont	Conservative
Kingswood	Robert Hayward	Conservative
Kirkcaldy	Harry Gourlay	Labour
Knowsley, North	Robert Kilroy-Silk	Labour
Knowsley, South	Sean Hughes	Labour
=== L ===
Lagan Valley	James Molyneaux	Official Unionist
Lancashire, West	Kenneth Hind	Conservative
Lancaster	Elaine Kellett-Bowman	Conservative
Langbaurgh	Richard Holt	Conservative
Leeds, Central	Derek Fatchett	Labour
Leeds, East	Denis Healey	Labour
Leeds, North East	Keith Joseph	Conservative
Leeds, North West	Keith Hampson	Conservative
Leeds South and Morley	see Morley and Leeds South	
Leeds, West	Michael Meadowcroft	Liberal
Leicester, East	Peter Bruinvels	Conservative
Leicester South	Derek Spencer	Conservative
Leicester, West	Greville Janner	Labour
Leicestershire, North West	David Ashby	Conservative
Leigh	Lawrence Cunliffe	Labour
Leominster	Peter Temple-Morris	Conservative
Lewes	Tim Rathbone	Conservative
Lewisham Deptford	John Silkin	Labour
Lewisham, East	Colin Moynihan	Conservative
Lewisham, West	John Maples	Conservative
Leyton	Harry Cohen	Labour
Lincoln	Kenneth Carlisle	Conservative
Linlithgow	Tam Dalyell	Labour
Littleborough and Saddleworth	Geoffrey Dickens	Conservative
Liverpool, Broadgreen	Terence Fields	Labour
Liverpool, Garston	Eddie Loyden	Labour
Liverpool, Mossley Hill	David Alton	Liberal
Liverpool, Riverside	Robert Parry	Labour
Liverpool, Walton	Eric Heffer	Labour
Liverpool, West Derby	Robert Wareing	Labour
Livingston	Robin Cook	Labour
Llanelli	Denzil Davies	Labour
Londonderry, East	William Ross	Official Unionist
Loughborough	Stephen Dorrell	Conservative
Ludlow	Eric Cockeram	Conservative
Luton, North	John Carlisle	Conservative
Luton, South	Graham Bright	Conservative
=== M ===
Macclesfield	Nick Winterton	Conservative
Maidstone	John Wells	Conservative
Makerfield	Michael McGuire	Labour
Manchester, Blackley	Kenneth Eastham	Labour
Manchester, Central	Robert Litherland	Labour
Manchester, Gorton	Gerald Kaufman	Labour
Manchester, Withington	Frederick Silvester	Conservative
Manchester, Wythenshawe	Alfred Morris	Labour Co-operative
Mansfield	Don Concannon	Labour
Medway	Peggy Fenner	Conservative
Meirionnydd Nant Conwy	Dafydd Elis-Thomas	Plaid Cymru
Meriden	Iain Mills	Conservative
Merthyr Tydfil and Rhymney	Ted Rowlands	Labour
Middlesbrough	Stuart Bell	Labour
Midlothian	Alexander Eadie	Labour
Milton Keynes	William Benyon	Conservative
Mitcham and Morden	Angela Rumbold	Conservative
Mole Valley	Kenneth Baker	Conservative
Monklands, East	John Smith	Labour
Monklands, West	Tom Clarke	Labour
Monmouth	John Stradling Thomas	Conservative
Montgomery	Alex Carlile	Liberal
Moray	Alexander Pollock	Conservative
Morecambe and Lunesdale	Mark Lennox-Boyd	Conservative
Morley and Leeds South	Merlyn Rees	Labour
Motherwell, North	James Hamilton	Labour
Motherwell, South	Jeremy Bray	Labour
=== N ===
Neath	Donald Coleman	Labour
Newark	Richard Alexander	Conservative
Newbury	Michael McNair-Wilson	Conservative
Newcastle upon Tyne, Central	Piers Merchant	Conservative
Newcastle upon Tyne, East	Nick Brown	Labour
Newcastle upon Tyne, North	Robert Brown	Labour
Newcastle-under-Lyme	John Golding	Labour
New Forest	Patrick McNair-Wilson	Conservative
Newham, North East	Ronald Leighton	Labour
Newham, North West	Tony Banks	Labour
Newham, South	Nigel Spearing	Labour
Newport, East	Roy Hughes	Labour
Newport, West	Mark Robinson	Conservative
Newry & Armagh	Jim Nicholson	Official Unionist
Norfolk, Mid	Richard Ryder	Conservative
Norfolk North	Ralph Howell	Conservative
Norfolk, North West	Henry Bellingham	Conservative
Norfolk, South	John MacGregor	Conservative
Norfolk, South West	Paul Hawkins	Conservative
Normanton	Bill O'Brien	Labour
Northampton, North	Tony Marlow	Conservative
Northampton, South	Michael Morris	Conservative
North Thanet	Roger Gale	Conservative
Northavon	John Cope	Conservative
Norwich, North	Patrick Thompson	Conservative
Norwich, South	John Powley	Conservative
Norwood	John Fraser	Labour
Nottingham, East	Michael Knowles	Conservative
Nottingham, North	Richard Ottaway	Conservative
Nottingham, South	Martin Brandon-Bravo	Conservative
Nuneaton	Lewis Stevens	Conservative
=== O ===
Ogmore	Raymond Powell	Labour
Old Bexley and Sidcup	Edward Heath	Conservative
Oldham, Central and Royton	James Lamond	Labour
Oldham, West	Michael Meacher	Labour
Orkney and Shetland	Jim Wallace	Liberal
Orpington	Ivor Stanbrook	Conservative
Oxford, East	Steven Norris	Conservative
Oxford, West and Abingdon	John Patten	Conservative
=== P ===
Paisley, North	Allen Adams	Labour
Paisley, South	Norman Buchan	Labour
Peckham	Harriet Harman	Labour
Pembrokeshire	Nicholas Edwards	Conservative
Pendle	John Lee	Conservative
Penrith and The Border	William Whitelaw	Conservative
Perth and Kinross	Nicholas Fairbairn	Conservative
Peterborough	Brian Mawhinney	Conservative
Plymouth, Devonport	David Owen	Social Democrat
Plymouth, Drake	Janet Fookes	Conservative
Plymouth, Sutton	Alan Clark	Conservative
Pontefract and Castleford	Geoffrey Lofthouse	Labour
Pontypridd	Brynmor John	Labour
Poole	John Ward	Conservative
Portsmouth, North	Peter Griffiths	Conservative
Portsmouth, South	Bonner Pink	Conservative
Preston	Stanley Thorne	Labour
Pudsey	Giles Shaw	Conservative
Putney	David Mellor	Conservative
=== R ===
Ravensbourne	John Hunt	Conservative
Reading, East	Gerard Vaughan	Conservative
Reading, West	Tony Durant	Conservative
Redcar	James Tinn	Labour
Reigate	George Gardiner	Conservative
Renfrew, West and Inverclyde	Anna McCurley	Conservative
Rhondda	Allan Rogers	Labour
Ribble Valley	David Waddington	Conservative
Richmond and Barnes	Jeremy Hanley	Conservative
Richmond (Yorkshire)	Leon Brittan	Conservative
Rochdale	Cyril Smith	Liberal
Rochford	Michael Clark	Conservative
Romford	Michael Neubert	Conservative
Romsey and Waterside	Michael Colvin	Conservative
Ross, Cromarty and Skye	Charles Kennedy	Social Democrat
Rossendale and Darwen	David Trippier	Conservative
Rotherham	Stanley Crowther	Labour
Rother Valley	Kevin Barron	Labour
Roxburgh and Berwickshire	Archy Kirkwood	Liberal
Rugby and Kenilworth	Jim Pawsey	Conservative
Ruislip-Northwood	John Wilkinson	Conservative
Rushcliffe	Kenneth Clarke	Conservative
Rutland and Melton	Michael Latham	Conservative
Ryedale	John Spence	Conservative
=== S ===
Saffron Walden	Alan Haselhurst	Conservative
St Albans	Peter Lilley	Conservative
St Helens, North	John Evans	Labour
St Helens, South	Gerald Bermingham	Labour
St Ives	David Harris	Conservative
Salford East	Stan Orme	Labour
Salisbury	Robert Key	Conservative
Scarborough	Michael Shaw	Conservative
Sedgefield	Tony Blair	Labour
Selby	Michael Alison	Conservative
Sevenoaks	Mark Wolfson	Conservative
Sheffield Attercliffe	Patrick Duffy	Labour
Sheffield Brightside	Joan Maynard	Labour
Sheffield Central	Richard Caborn	Labour
Sheffield Hallam	John Osborn	Conservative
Sheffield Heeley	Bill Michie	Labour
Sheffield Hillsborough	Martin Flannery	Labour
Sherwood	Andrew Stewart	Conservative
Shipley	Marcus Fox	Conservative
Shoreham	Richard Luce	Conservative
Shrewsbury and Atcham	Derek Conway	Conservative
Shropshire, North	John Biffen	Conservative
Skipton and Ripon	John Watson	Conservative
Slough	John Watts	Conservative
Solihull	John Taylor	Conservative
Somerton and Frome	Robert Boscawen	Conservative
Southampton, Itchen	Christopher Chope	Conservative
Southampton, Test	James Hill	Conservative
Southend, East	Teddy Taylor	Conservative
Southend, West	Paul Channon	Conservative
South Hams	Anthony Steen	Conservative
South Thanet	Jonathan Aitken	Conservative
Southport	Ian Percival	Conservative
South Ribble	Robert Atkins	Conservative
South Shields	David Clark	Labour
Southwark and Bermondsey	Simon Hughes	Liberal
Spelthorne	Humphrey Atkins	Conservative
Stafford	Hugh Fraser	Conservative
Staffordshire, Mid	John Heddle	Conservative
Staffordshire, Moorlands	David Knox	Conservative
Staffordshire, South	Patrick Cormack	Conservative
Staffordshire, South East	David Lightbown	Conservative
Stalybridge and Hyde	Tom Pendry	Labour
Stamford and Spalding	Kenneth Lewis	Conservative
Stevenage	Timothy Wood	Conservative
Stirling	Michael Forsyth	Conservative
Stockport	Anthony Favell	Conservative
Stockton, North	Frank Cook	Labour
Stockton, South	Ian Wrigglesworth	Social Democrat
Stoke-on-Trent, Central	Mark Fisher	Labour
Stoke-on-Trent, North	John Forrester	Labour
Stoke-on-Trent, South	Jack Ashley	Labour
Strangford	John Taylor	Official Unionist
Stratford-on-Avon	Alan Howarth	Conservative
Strathkelvin and Bearsden	Michael Hirst	Conservative
Streatham	William Shelton	Conservative
Stretford	Tony Lloyd	Labour
Stroud	Anthony Kershaw	Conservative
Suffolk, Central	Michael Lord	Conservative
Suffolk, Coastal	John Gummer	Conservative
Suffolk, South	Tim Yeo	Conservative
Sunderland, North	Bob Clay	Labour
Sunderland, South	Gordon Bagier	Labour
Surbiton	Richard Tracey	Conservative
Surrey, East	Geoffrey Howe	Conservative
Surrey, North West	Michael Grylls	Conservative
Surrey, South West	Maurice Macmillan	Conservative
Sussex, Mid	Tim Renton	Conservative
Sutton and Cheam	Neil Macfarlane	Conservative
Sutton Coldfield	Norman Fowler	Conservative
Swansea, East	Donald Anderson	Labour
Swansea, West	Alan Williams	Labour
Swindon	Simon Coombs	Conservative
=== T ===
Tatton	Neil Hamilton	Conservative
Taunton	Edward du Cann	Conservative
Tayside, North	Bill Walker	Conservative
Teignbridge	Patrick Nicholls	Conservative
Thurrock	Oonagh McDonald	Labour
Tiverton	Robin Maxwell-Hyslop	Conservative
Tonbridge and Malling	John Stanley	Conservative
Tooting	Tom Cox	Labour
Torbay	Frederic Bennett	Conservative
Torfaen	Leo Abse	Labour
Tottenham	Norman Atkinson	Labour
Truro	David Penhaligon	Liberal
Tunbridge Wells	Patrick Mayhew	Conservative
Tweeddale, Ettrick and Lauderdale	David Steel	Liberal
Twickenham	Toby Jessel	Conservative
Tyne Bridge	Harry Cowans	Labour
Tynemouth	Neville Trotter	Conservative
=== U ===
Ulster, Mid	William McCrea	Democratic Unionist
Upminster	Nicholas Bonsor	Conservative
Upper Bann	Harold McCusker	Official Unionist
Uxbridge	Michael Shersby	Conservative
=== V ===
Vale of Glamorgan	Raymond Gower	Conservative
Vauxhall	Stuart Holland	Labour
=== W ===
Wakefield	Walter Harrison	Labour
Wallasey	Lynda Chalker	Conservative
Wallsend	Ted Garrett	Labour
Walsall, North	David Winnick	Labour
Walsall, South	Bruce George	Labour
Walthamstow	Eric Deakins	Labour
Wansbeck	Jack Thompson	Labour
Wansdyke	Jack Aspinwall	Conservative
Wanstead and Woodford	Patrick Jenkin	Conservative
Wantage	Robert Jackson	Conservative
Warley, East	Andrew Faulds	Labour
Warley, West	Peter Archer	Labour
Warrington, North	Doug Hoyle	Labour
Warrington, South	Mark Carlisle	Conservative
Warwick and Leamington	Dudley Smith	Conservative
Warwickshire, North	Francis Maude	Conservative
Watford	Tristan Garel-Jones	Conservative
Waveney	Jim Prior	Conservative
Wealden	Geoffrey Johnson-Smith	Conservative
Wellingborough	Peter Fry	Conservative
Wells	David Heathcoat-Amory	Conservative
Welwyn, Hatfield	Christopher Murphy	Conservative
Wentworth	Peter Hardy	Labour
West Bromwich, East	Peter Snape	Labour
West Bromwich, West	Betty Boothroyd	Labour
Westbury	Dennis Walters	Conservative
Western Isles	Donald Stewart	Scottish National Party
Westminster, North	John Wheeler	Conservative
Westmorland and Lonsdale	Michael Jopling	Conservative
Weston-super-Mare	Jerry Wiggin	Conservative
Wigan	Roger Stott	Labour
Wiltshire, North	Richard Needham	Conservative
Wimbledon	Michael Havers	Conservative
Winchester	John Browne	Conservative
Windsor and Maidenhead	Alan Glyn	Conservative
Wirral, South	Barry Porter	Conservative
Wirral, West	David Hunt	Conservative
Witney	Douglas Hurd	Conservative
Woking	Cranley Onslow	Conservative
Wokingham	William van Straubenzee	Conservative
Wolverhampton, North East	Renée Short	Labour
Wolverhampton, South East	Bob Edwards	Labour Co-operative
Wolverhampton, South West	Nicholas Budgen	Conservative
Woodspring	Paul Dean	Conservative
Woolwich	John Cartwright	Social Democrat
Worcester	Peter Walker	Conservative
Worcestershire, Mid	Eric Forth	Conservative
Worcestershire, South	Michael Spicer	Conservative
Workington	Dale Campbell-Savours	Labour
Worsley	Terry Lewis	Labour
Worthing	Terence Higgins	Conservative
Wrekin, The	Warren Hawksley	Conservative
Wrexham	John Marek	Labour
Wycombe	Ray Whitney	Conservative
Wyre	Walter Clegg	Conservative
Wyre Forest	Esmond Bulmer	Conservative
=== Y ===
Yeovil	Paddy Ashdown	Liberal
Ynys Môn	Keith Best	Conservative
York	Conal Gregory	Conservative

== By-elections ==
See the list of United Kingdom by-elections.

Two seats were vacant when Parliament was dissolved preparatory to the 1987 general election:

- Kirkcaldy – Harry Gourlay (Lab) died 20 April 1987
- Lewisham, Deptford – John Silkin (Lab) died 26 April 1987

== See also ==
- Results of the United Kingdom general election, 1983
