= Norfolk (European Parliament constituency) =

Former European Parliament constituency

- European Parliament constituency
- Boundary within the East of England (1979-1984)
- Member state: United Kingdom
- Created: 1979
- Dissolved: 1999
- MEPs: 1

Norfolk was a constituency of the European Parliament located in the United Kingdom, electing one Member of the European Parliament by the first-past-the-post electoral system. Created in 1979 for the first elections to the European Parliament, it was abolished in 1999 on the adoption of proportional representation for European elections in the United Kingdom. It was succeeded by the East of England region.

Boundary within the East of England (1984–1994)

Boundary within the East of England (1994–1999)

== Boundaries ==
On its creation in 1979, it consisted of the parliamentary constituencies of North Norfolk, North West Norfolk, South Norfolk, South West Norfolk, Norwich North, Norwich South and Yarmouth.

After the 1984 boundary changes based on the new UK parliamentary constituencies created in 1983, it consisted of the constituencies of Great Yarmouth, Mid Norfolk, North Norfolk, North West Norfolk, Norwich North, Norwich South, South Norfolk and South West Norfolk.

1994 saw further boundary changes and the constituency now consisted of Great Yarmouth, Mid Norfolk, North Norfolk, North West Norfolk, Norwich North, Norwich South and South Norfolk. South West Norfolk was transferred to the constituency of Suffolk and South West Norfolk.

The entire area became part of the East of England constituency in 1999.

== MEPs ==
The constituency's first MEP, Paul Howell, was the son of Sir Ralph Howell, the long-serving Conservative MP for North Norfolk which was in this constituency.

| Elected | Member | Party |
|---|---|---|
| 1979 | Paul Howell | Conservative |
| 1984 | Paul Howell | Conservative |
| 1989 | Paul Howell | Conservative |
| 1994 | Clive Needle | Labour |
| 1999 | constituency abolished, part of East of England from 1999 | |

== Election results ==
European Parliament election, 1994: Norfolk
| Party | Candidate | Votes | % | ±% |
|---|---|---|---|---|
| Labour | Clive Needle | 102,711 | 45.2 | +12.5 |
| Conservative | Paul Frederick Howell | 76,424 | 33.6 | −8.7 |
| Liberal Democrats | Paul Burall | 39,107 | 17.2 | +13.1 |
| Green | Adrian Holmes | 7,938 | 3.5 | −15.1 |
| Natural Law | Bryan Parsons | 1,075 | 0.5 | New |
| Majority | | 26,287 | 11.6 | N/A |
| Turnout | | 227,255 | 44.3 | +6.5 |
| Labour gain from Conservative | | Swing | +10.6 | |

European Parliament election, 1989: Norfolk
| Party | Candidate | Votes | % | ±% |
|---|---|---|---|---|
| Conservative | Paul Frederick Howell | 92,385 | 42.3 | −7.5 |
| Labour | Mary E Page | 71,478 | 32.7 | +2.2 |
| Green | Mike G Macartney-Filgate | 40,575 | 18.6 | New |
| SLD | Richard A Lawes | 8,902 | 4.1 | −15.6 |
| SDP | Stuart D Maxwell | 4,934 | 2.3 | −17.4 |
| Majority | | 20,907 | 9.6 | −9.7 |
| Turnout | | 218,274 | 37.8 | +2.5 |
| Conservative hold | | Swing | −4.9 | |

European Parliament election, 1984: Norfolk
| Party | Candidate | Votes | % | ±% |
|---|---|---|---|---|
| Conservative | Paul Frederick Howell | 95,459 | 49.8 | −10.0 |
| Labour | A E B (Bryan) Heading | 58,602 | 30.5 | +0.1 |
| SDP | Leighton V Williams | 37,703 | 19.7 | +9.9 |
| Majority | | 36,857 | 19.3 | −10.1 |
| Turnout | | 191,764 | 35.3 | +1.2 |
| Conservative hold | | Swing | −5.1 | |

European Parliament election, 1979: Norfolk
| Party | Candidate | Votes | % | ±% |
|---|---|---|---|---|
| Conservative | Paul Frederick Howell | 102,981 | 59.8 | |
| Labour | H Gray | 52,406 | 30.4 | |
| Liberal | E B S Baxter | 16,805 | 9.8 | |
| Majority | | 50,575 | 29.4 | |
| Turnout | | 172,192 | 34.1 | |
| Conservative win (new seat) | | | | |
