= Suffolk and South West Norfolk (European Parliament constituency) =

Former European Parliament constituency

- European Parliament constituency
- Boundary within the East of England (1994-1999)
- Member state: United Kingdom
- Created: 1994
- Dissolved: 1999
- MEPs: 1

Suffolk and South West Norfolk was a constituency of the European Parliament located in the United Kingdom, electing one Member of the European Parliament by the first-past-the-post electoral system. Created in 1994 from parts of Suffolk and Norfolk, it was abolished in 1999 on the adoption of proportional representation for European elections in the United Kingdom. It was succeeded by the East of England region.

== Boundaries ==
It consisted of the parliamentary constituencies of Bury St Edmunds, Central Suffolk, Ipswich, South West Norfolk, Suffolk Coastal and Waveney. South West Norfolk had previously been part of the Norfolk constituency.

The entire area became part of the East of England constituency in 1999.

== MEPs ==
Election	Member	Party
part of Suffolk and Norfolk prior to 1994
1994	David Thomas	Labour
1999	constituency abolished, part of East of England from 1999	

== Election results ==
1994 European Parliament election in the United Kingdom: Suffolk and South West Norfolk
Party	Candidate	Votes	%	±%
Labour	David Thomas	74,304	40.5	
Conservative	Amédée Edward Turner	61,799	33.7	
Liberal Democrats	Richard Atkins	37,975	20.7	
Green	Tony Slade	7,760	4.2	
Natural Law	Eric Kaplan	1,530	0.8	
Majority		12,535	6.8	
Turnout		183,368	38.4	
Labour win (new seat)				
