= Results of the 1983 United Kingdom general election =

The results of the 1983 United Kingdom general election, by parliamentary constituency were as follows:

Constituency	Cnty	Rgn	Last elctn	Winning party				Turnout (Note: Excludes spoilt ballots)	Votes										
Constituency	Cnty	Rgn	Last elctn	Party	Votes	Share	Majrty	Turnout	Con	Lab (Note: Excludes Speaker) (Note: Includes Labour Party and allied Co-operative Party)	SDP-Lib (Note: Includes official Liberal candidates who were not given national Alliance endorsement in three constituencies: Liverpool Broadgreen, Hackney South and Shoreditch, and Hammersmith.)	SNP	UUP	DUP	SDLP	PC	SF	Other (Note: Includes all other parties, all independent candidates and the Speaker)	Total
Aberavon	WGM	WLS	Lab	Lab	23,745	58.8%	15,539	75.6%	6,605	23,745	8,206					1,859			40,415
Aberdeen North	SCT	SCT	Lab	Lab	19,262	47.0%	9,144	65.0%	7,426	19,262	10,118	3,790						67	40,663
Aberdeen South	SCT	SCT	Con	Con	15,393	38.9%	3,581	68.7%	15,393	11,812	10,372	1,974							39,551
Aldershot	HAM	SE	Con	Con	31,288	55.5%	12,218	72.7%	31,288	6,070	19,070								56,425
Aldridge-Brownhills	WMD	WM	Con	Con	24,148	50.7%	12,284	78.3%	24,148	11,864	11,599								47,611
Altrincham and Sale	GTM	NW	Con	Con	25,321	52.5%	10,911	73.0%	25,321	7,684	14,410							781	48,196
Alyn and Deeside	CON	WLS	(Note: Constituency created in the 1983 boundary review)	Lab	17,806	40.3%	1,368	78.1%	16,438	17,806	9,535					413			44,192
Amber Valley	DBY	EM	Con	Con	21,502	41.7%	3,318	77.2%	21,502	18,184	10,989							856	51,531
Argyll and Bute	SCT	SCT		Con	13,380	38.6%	3,844	72.9%	13,380	3,204	9,536	8,514							34,634
Arundel	WSX	SE	Con	Con	31,096	59.6%	15,701	69.7%	31,096	4,302	15,391							1,399	52,188
Ashfield	NTT	EM	Lab	Lab	21,859	41.7%	6,087	74.8%	15,772	21,859	13,812								51,443
Ashford	KEN	SE	Con	Con	27,230	56.8%	13,911	73.2%	27,230	6,167	13,319							1,220	47,936
Ashton-under-Lyne	GTM	NW	Lab	Lab	20,987	49.7%	7,697	71.6%	13,290	20,987	7,521							407	42,196
Aylesbury	BKM	SE	Con	Con	30,230	58.1%	14,920	71.5%	30,230	6,364	15,310							166	52,070
Ayr	SCT	SCT	Con	Con	21,325	42.8%	7,987	76.7%	21,325	13,338	12,740	2,431							49,834
Banbury	OXF	SE	Con	Con	26,225	53.4%	13,025	75.2%	26,225	9,343	13,200							383	49,151
Banff and Buchan	SCT	SCT		Con	16,072	39.7%	937	67.0%	16,072	3,150	6,084	15,135							40,441
Barking	LND	LND	Lab	Lab	14,415	42.1%	4,026	65.4%	10,389	14,415	8,770							646	34,220
Barnsley Central	SYK	YTH		Lab	21,847	59.8%	14,173	66.3%	7,674	21,847	7,011								36,532
Barnsley East	SYK	YTH		Lab	23,905	66.3%	17,492	67.3%	5,749	23,905	6,413								36,067
Barnsley West and Penistone	SYK	YTH		Lab	22,560	50.8%	10,342	73.2%	12,218	22,560	9,624								44,402
Barrow and Furness	CMA	NW	Lab	Con	22,284	43.6%	4,577	75.2%	22,284	17,707	11,079								51,070
Basildon	ESS	E	Con	Con	17,516	38.7%	1,379	69.0%	17,516	16,137	11,634								45,287
Basingstoke	HAM	SE	Con	Con	28,381	51.3%	12,450	76.8%	28,381	10,646	15,931							344	55,302
Bassetlaw	NTT	EM	Lab	Lab	22,231	45.6%	3,831	74.2%	18,400	22,231	8,124								48,755
Bath	AVN	SW	Con	Con	22,544	47.1%	5,304	74.4%	22,544	7,259	17,240							827	47,870
Batley and Spen	WYK	YTH		Con	21,433	39.6%	870	73.4%	21,433	20,563	11,678							493	54,167
Battersea	LND	LND		Con	19,248	43.8%	3,276	66.6%	19,248	15,972	7,675							1,024	43,919
Beckenham	LND	LND	Con	Con	23,606	57.4%	12,670	69.3%	23,606	6,386	10,936							203	41,131
Beaconsfield	BKM	SE	Con	Con	30,552	63.8%	18,300	72.4%	30,552	5,107	12,252								47,911
Belfast East	NIR	NIR	DUP	DUP	17,631	45.3%	7,989	70.0%					9,642	17,631	519		682	10,437	38,911
Belfast North	NIR	NIR	DUP	UUP	15,339	36.2%	7,079	69.4%					15,339	8,260	5,944		5,451	7,425	42,419
Belfast South	NIR	NIR	UUP	UUP	18,669	50.0%	9,724	69.6%					18,669	4,565	3,216		1,107	9,801	37,358
Belfast West	NIR	NIR	SDLP	SF	16,379	36.9%	5,445	74.3%					2,435	2,399	10,934		16,379	12,219	44,366
Berwick-upon-Tweed	NBL	NE	Lib	Lib	21,958	52.7%	8,215	77.8%	13,743	5,975	21,958								41,676
Bethnal Green and Stepney	LND	LND		Lab	15,740	51.0%	6,358	55.7%	4,323	15,740	9,382							1,393	30,838
Beverley	HUM	YTH		Con	31,233	56.3%	13,869	73.2%	31,233	6,921	17,364								55,518
Bexhill and Battle	SXE	SE		Con	30,329	67.3%	19,746	72.9%	30,329	3,587	10,583							538	45,037
Bexleyheath	LND	LND	Con	Con	23,411	53.1%	10,258	74.5%	23,411	7,560	13,153								44,124
Billericay	ESS	E		Con	29,635	53.7%	14,615	73.8%	29,635	10,528	15,020								55,183
Birkenhead	MSY	NW	Lab	Lab	23,249	49.6%	9,714	69.7%	13,535	23,249	9,782								46,566
Birmingham Edgbaston	WMD	WM	Con	Con	19,585	53.7%	11,418	66.2%	19,585	7,467	8,167							1,075	36,474
Birmingham Erdington	WMD	WM	Lab	Lab	14,930	39.8%	231	67.0%	14,699	14,930	7,915								37,554
Birmingham Hall Green	WMD	WM	Con	Con	21,142	49.1%	9,373	70.6%	21,142	11,769	10,175								43,086
Birmingham Hodge Hill	WMD	WM		Lab	19,692	47.6%	5,092	67.6%	14,600	19,692	6,557							529	41,378
Birmingham Ladywood	WMD	WM	Lab	Lab	14,930	51.0%	9,030	62.6%	19,278	10,248	7,758							553	37,837
Birmingham Northfield	WMD	WM	Con	Con	22,596	42.7%	2,760	71.2%	22,596	19,836	10,045							420	52,897
Birmingham Perry Barr	WMD	WM	Lab	Lab	27,061	52.5%	7,402	69.2%	19,659	27,061	4,773								51,493
Birmingham Selly Oak	WMD	WM	Con	Con	23,008	44.9%	5,396	71.5%	23,008	17,612	10,613								51,233
Birmingham Sparkbrook	WMD	WM	Lab	Lab	19,757	59.9%	10,548	61.5%	9,209	19,757	3,416								32,968
Birmingham Small Heath	WMD	WM	Lab	Lab	22,874	63.8%	15,612	60.4%	7,262	22,874	5,722								35,858
Birmingham Yardley	WMD	WM	Con	Con	17,986	43.2%	2,865	72.1%	17,986	15,121	8,109							415	41,631
Bishop Auckland	DUR	NE	Lab	Lab	22,750	44.4%	4,306	72.1%	18,444	22,750	10,070								51,264
Blaby	LEI	EM		Con	32,689	58.7%	17,116	77.4%	32,689	6,838	15,573							568	55,668
Blackburn	LAN	NW	Lab	Lab	25,400	44.7%	3,055	74.6%	22,345	25,400	8,174							864	56,784
Blackpool North	LAN	NW	Con	Con	20,592	51.1%	10,152	70.0%	20,592	8,730	10,440							514	40,276
Blackpool South	LAN	NW	Con	Con	19,852	50.6%	10,138	69.8%	19,852	9,714	9,417							263	39,246
Blaenau Gwent	GNT	WLS		Lab	30,113	70.0%	23,625	76.8%	4,816	30,113	6,488					1,624			43,041
Blaydon	TWR	NE	Lab	Lab	21,285	44.4%	7,222	73.2%	14,063	21,185	12,607								47,955
Blyth Valley	NBL	NE	Lab	Lab	16,583	39.5%	3,243	72.8%	11,657	16,583	13,340							406	41,986
Bolsover	DBY	EM	Lab	Lab	26,514	56.3%	13,848	72.7%	12,666	26,514	7,886								47,066
Bolton North East	GTM	NW		Con	19,632	43.2%	2,443	77.1%	19,632	17,189	8,311							290	45,318
Bolton South East	GTM	NW		Lab	23,984	48.3%	8,753	73.6%	15,231	23,984	10,157							296	49,668
Bolton West	GTM	NW	Lab	Con	23,731	45.1%	7,152	78.1%	23,731	16,579	12,321								52,631
Boothferry	HUM	YTH		Con	30,536	57.7%	17,420	73.1%	30,536	9,271	13,116								52,923
Bootle	MSY	NW	Lab	Lab	27,282	53.0%	15,139	68.3%	12,143	27,282	12,068								51,493
Bosworth	LEI	EM	Con	Con	31,663	55.4%	17,294	78.2%	31,663	11,120	14,369								57,152
Bournemouth East	DOR	SW	Con	Con	25,176	53.5%	11,416	66.6%	25,176	4,026	13,760							4,142	47,104
Bournemouth West	DOR	SW	Con	Con	28,466	56.9%	13,331	69.2%	28,466	6,243	15,135							180	50,024
Bow and Poplar	LND	LND	Con	Con	15,878	49.6%	5,861	55.4%	5,129	15,878	10,017							979	32,003
Bradford North	WYK	YTH	Lab	Con	16,094	34.3%	1,602	70.8%	16,094	14,492	11,962							4,405	46,953
Bradford South	WYK	YTH	Lab	Lab	18,542	37.5%	110	71.0%	18,432	18,542	12,143							308	49,425
Bradford West	WYK	YTH	Lab	Lab	19,499	39.7%	3,337	68.9%	16,162	19,499	13,301							139	49,101
Braintree	ESS	E	Con	Con	29,462	52.6%	13,441	76.2%	29,462	10,551	16,021								56,034
Brecon and Radnor	POW	WLS	Con	Con	18,255	48.2%	8,784	80.1%	18,255	9,471	9,226					640		278	37,870
Brent East	LND	LND	Lab	Lab	18,363	47.0%	4,834	63.6%	13,529	18,363	6,598							599	39,088
Brent North	LND	LND	Con	Con	24,842	56.3%	14,651	70.4%	24,842	10,191	9,082								44,115
Brent South	LND	LND	Lab	Lab	21,259	53.3%	10,519	63.6%	10,740	21,259	7,557							356	39,912
Brentford and Isleworth	LND	LND	Con	Con	24,515	47.4%	9,387	74.7%	24,515	15,128	11,438							606	51,683
Brentwood and Ongar	ESS	E	Con	Con	29,484	58.4%	14,202	76.6%	29,484	5,739	15,282								50,505
Bridgend	MGM	WLS		Con	15,950	38.4%	1,327	77.0%	15,950	14,623	9,630					1,312			41,515
Bridgwater	SOM	SW	Con	Con	25,107	52.3%	10,697	74.8%	25,107	8,524	14,410								48,041
Bridlington	HUM	YTH	Con	Con	31,284	57.8%	16,609	70.6%	31,284	7,370	14,675							803	54,132
Brigg and Cleethorpes	HUM	YTH		Con	28,893	50.7%	12,189	73.6%	28,893	11,404	16,704								57,001
Brighton Kemptown	SXE	SE	Con	Con	22,265	51.1%	9,378	71.5%	22,265	12,887	8,098							290	43,540
Brighton Pavilion	SXE	SE	Con	Con	21,323	51.5%	11,132	69.3%	21,323	9,879	10,191								41,393
Bristol East	AVN	SW		Con	19,844	40.5%	11,132	73.9%	19,844	18,055	10,404							654	48,957
Bristol North West	AVN	SW	Con	Con	24,617	43.9%	6,327	76.9%	24,617	18,290	13,228								56,135
Bristol South	AVN	SW	Lab	Lab	21,824	44.0%	4,419	68.8%	17,405	21,824	9,674							689	49,592
Bristol West	AVN	SW	Con	Con	25,400	49.1%	10,178	70.7%	25,400	10,094	15,222								51,730
Bromsgrove	HWR	WM		Con	27,911	56.2%	17,175	75.1%	27,911	10,280	10,736							716	49,643
Broxbourne	HRT	E		Con	29,328	58.8%	17,466	74.0%	29,328	8,159	11,862							502	49,851
Broxtowe	NTT	EM		Con	28,522	53.5%	15,078	76.5%	28,522	11,368	13,444								53,334
Buckingham	BKM	SE	Con	Con	27,522	56.9%	13,938	77.1%	27,522	7,272	13,584								48,378
Burnley	LAN	NW	Lab	Lab	20,178	39.8%	787	76.3%	19,391	20,178	11,191								50,760
Burton	STS	WM	Con	Con	27,874	51.1%	11,647	75.9%	27,874	16,227	10,420								54,521
Bury North	GTM	NW		Con	23,923	45.5%	2,792	79.6%	23,923	21,131	7,550								52,604
Bury South	GTM	NW		Con	21,718	44.0%	3,720	76.1%	21,718	17,998	9,628								52,604
Bury St Edmunds	SFK	E	Con	Con	31,081	59.0%	16,122	72.3%	31,081	6,666	14,959								52,706
Caernarfon	GWN	WLS	PC	PC	18,308	52.7%	10,989	78.6%	7,319	6,736	2,356					18,308			34,719
Caerphilly	GNT	WLS	Lab	Lab	21,570	45.6%	11,553	74.5%	9,295	21,570	10,017					6,414			47,296
Caithness and Sutherland	SCT	SCT	Lab	SDP	12,119	52.0%	6,843	75.4%	5,276	3,325	12,119	2,568							23,288
Calder Valley	WYK	YTH		Con	24,439	43.7%	7,999	78.5%	24,439	15,108	16,440								55,987
Cambridge	CAM	E	Con	Con	20,931	41.5%	5,968	75.2%	20,931	14,240	14,963							286	50,420
Cannock and Burntwood	STS	WM		Con	20,976	40.9%	2,045	77.4%	20,976	18,931	11,336								51,243
Canterbury	KEN	SE	Con	Con	29,029	56.5%	15,742	70.0%	29,029	7,906	13,287							1,188	51,410
Cardiff Central	SGM	WLS		Con	16,090	41.4%	3,452	72.1%	16,090	9,387	12,638					704			38,819
Cardiff North	SGM	WLS	Con	Con	19,433	47.1%	6,848	77.3%	19,433	8,256	12,585					974			41,248
Cardiff South and Penarth	SGM	WLS		Lab	17,448	41.3%	2,276	71.0%	15,172	17,448	8,816					673		165	42,274
Cardiff West	SGM	WLS	Spkr	Con	15,472	38.0%	1,774	69.6%	15,472	13,698	10,388					848		352	40,758
Carlisle	CMA	NW	Lab	Lab	15,618	37.5%	71	76.4%	15,547	15,618	10,471								41,638
Carmarthen	DFD	WLS	Lab	Lab	16,459	31.6%	1,154	82.1%	15,305	16,459	5,737					14,099		528	52,126
Carrick, Cumnock and Doon Valley	SCT	SCT		Lab	21,394	51.5%	11,370	74.3%	10,024	21,394	7,421	2,694							41,533
Carshalton and Wallington	LND	LND		Con	25,396	51.3%	10,755	71.1%	25,396	8,655	14,641							784	49,476
Castle Point	ESS	E		Con	26,730	58.5%	15,417	71.3%	26,730	7,621	11,313								45,664
Central Fife	SCT	SCT	Lab	Lab	17,008	43.1%	7,794	72.5%	8,863	17,008	9,214	4,039						297	39,421
Ceredigion and Pembroke North	DFD	WLS		Lib	19,677	41.8%	5,639	77.8%	14,038	6,840	19,677					6,072		431	47,058
Cheadle	GTM	NW	Con	Con	28,452	55.7%	9,380	76.8%	28,452	3,553	19,072								51,077
Chelmsford	ESS	E	Con	Con	29,824	47.6%	378	79.4%	29,824	3,208	29,446							127	62,605
Chelsea	LND	LND	Con	Con	19,122	63.2%	12,021	56.1%	19,122	3,876	7,101							139	30,238
Cheltenham	GLS	SW	Con	Con	29,187	50.6%	5,518	75.9%	29,187	4,390	23,669							479	57,724
Chertsey and Walton	SRY	SE	Con	Con	29,679	58.3%	15,699	72.5%	29,679	6,902	13,980							318	50,879
Chesham and Amersham	BKM	SE	Con	Con	32,435	61.0%	15,879	75.9%	32,435	4,150	16,556								53,141
Chesterfield	DBY	EM	Lab	Lab	23,881	48.1%	7,763	72.6%	16,118	23,881	9,705								49,704
Chichester	WSX	SE	Con	Con	35,482	63.7%	20,117	72.1%	35,482	3,995	15,365							838	55,680
Chingford	LND	LND	Con	Con	22,541	55.1%	12,414	72.7%	22,541	7,239	10,127							997	40,904
Chipping Barnet	LND	LND	Con	Con	23,164	56.1%	12,393	70.7%	23,164	6,599	10,771							747	41,281
Chislehurst	LND	LND	Con	Con	22,108	55.7%	12,061	72.7%	22,108	7,320	10,047							201	39,676
Chorley	LAN	NW	Con	Con	27,861	48.3%	10,275	79.2%	27,861	17,586	11,691							565	57,703
Christchurch	DOR	SW		Con	31,722	67.1%	19,738	72.2%	31,722	3,590	11,984								47,296
Cirencester and Tewkesbury	GLS	SW	Con	Con	34,282	57.2%	13,827	74.9%	34,282	5,243	20,455								59,980
City of Chester	CHS	NW	Con	Con	22,645	47.1%	9,099	74.5%	22,645	13,546	11,874								48,065
City of Durham	DUR	NE	Lab	Lab	18,163	36.5%	1,973	74.4%	15,438	18,163	16,190								49,791
City of London and Westminster South	LND	LND	Con	Con	20,754	59.1%	13,387	51.8%	20,754	6,013	7,367							985	35,119
Clackmannan	SCT	SCT		Lab	16,478	45.8%	9,639	75.6%	6,490	16,478	6,205	6,839						239	36,012
Clwyd North West	CON	WLS		Con	23,283	51.0%	9,989	73.1%	23,283	7,433	13,294					1,669			45,679
Clwyd South West	CON	WLS		Con	14,575	33.8%	1,551	77.3%	14,575	11,829	13,024					3,684			43,112
Clydebank and Milngavie	SCT	SCT		Lab	17,288	44.8%	7,715	75.9%	7,852	17,288	9,573	3,566						308	38,587
Clydesdale	SCT	SCT		Lab	17,873	38.8%	4,866	76.5%	13,007	17,873	9,908	5,271							46,059
Colne Valley	WYK	YTH	Lib	Lib	21,139	39.8%	3,146	76.2%	17,993	13,668	21,139							260	53,060
Congleton	CHS	NW		Con	23,895	48.7%	8,459	76.9%	23,895	9,783	15,436								49,114
Conwy	CON	WLS	Con	Con	16,413	41.7%	4,268	76.4%	16,413	6,731	12,145					4,105			39,394
Copeland	CMA	NW		Lab	18,756	44.2%	1,837	78.2%	16,619	18,756	6,722								42,397
Corby	NTH	EM		Con	20,827	42.6%	3,168	77.5%	20,827	17,659	9,905							505	48,896
Cornwall North	CUL	SW	Con	Con	28,146	52.4%	5,059	80.4%	28,146	2,096	23,087							364	53,693
Coventry North East	WMD	WM	Lab	Lab	22,190	47.8%	8,775	69.2%	13,415	22,190	10,251							535	46,389
Coventry North West	WMD	WM	Lab	Lab	17,239	44.3%	3,038	74.7%	14,201	17,239	7,479								38,919
Coventry South East	WMD	WM	Lab	Lab	15,307	41.1%	2,682	70.9%	12,625	15,307	9,323								37,255
Coventry South West	WMD	WM	Con	Con	22,223	45.0%	6,447	75.9%	22,223	15,776	11,174							214	49,387
Crawley	WSX	SE		Con	25,963	48.1%	11,814	76.4%	25,963	14,149	13,900								54,012
Crewe and Nantwich	CHS	NW		Lab	22,031	41.1%	290	74.7%	21,741	22,031	9,820								53,592
Crosby	MSY	NW	Con	Con	30,604	47.2%	3,401	77.9%	30,604	6,611	27,203							415	64,833
Croydon Central	LND	LND	Con	Con	20,866	53.8%	11,821	68.6%	20,866	9,045	8,864								38,775
Croydon North East	LND	LND	Con	Con	22,292	52.5%	11,637	67.5%	22,292	9,503	10,665								38,460
Croydon North West	LND	LND	Con	Con	16,674	42.3%	4,092	67.6%	16,674	9,561	12,582							622	39,439
Croydon South	LND	LND	Con	Con	29,842	65.1%	17,440	71.1%	29,842	3,568	12,402								46,702
Cumbernauld and Kilsyth	SCT	SCT		Lab	16,629	49.2%	9,928	76.5%	4,590	16,629	6,701	5,875							33,795
Cunninghame North	SCT	SCT		Con	15,557	38.7%	1,637	75.7%	15,557	13,920	7,268	3,460							40,205
Cunninghame South	SCT	SCT		Lab	19,344	54.1%	11,768	73.6%	7,576	19,344	6,370	2,451							35,741
Cynon Valley	MGM	WLS		Lab	20,668	56.0%	13,074	73.4%	5,240	20,668	7,594					3,421			36,923
Dagenham	LND	LND	Lab	Lab	15,665	39.3%	2,997	63.4%	12,688	15,665	10,769							786	39,878
Darlington	DUR	NE	Lab	Con	22,434	44.6%	3,438	80.8%	22,434	18,996	8,737							108	50,275
Dartford	KEN	SE	Con	Con	28,199	51.6%	13,563	76.4%	28,199	14,636	11,204							656	54,695
Daventry	NTH	EM	Con	Con	26,357	53.3%	13,136	76.8%	26,357	9,840	13,221								49,418
Davyhulme	GTM	NW		Con	22,055	46.0%	9,014	73.9%	22,055	12,887	13,041								47,983
Delyn	CON	WLS		Con	20,242	41.6%	5,944	77.9%	20,242	14,298	12,545					1,558			48,643
Denton and Reddish	GTM	NW		Lab	22,123	44.2%	5,125	72.5%	16,998	22,123	10,869								49,990
Derby North	DBY	EM	Lab	Con	22,303	43.7%	3,506	72.5%	22,303	18,797	9,924								51,024
Derby South	DBY	EM	Lab	Lab	18,169	39.3%	421	67.4%	17,748	18,169	9,976							297	46,190
Devizes	WIL	SW	Con	Con	33,644	54.0%	15,624	75.0%	33,644	10,468	18,020							234	62,366
Dewsbury	WYK	YTH	Lab	Con	20,297	39.4%	2,086	70.8%	20,297	18,211	13,065								51,573
Don Valley	SYK	YTH	Lab	Lab	23,036	45.1%	6,466	69.9%	16,570	23,036	11,482								51,088
Doncaster Central	SYK	YTH		Lab	21,154	42.0%	2,508	70.8%	18,646	21,154	10,524								50,324
Doncaster North	SYK	YTH		Lab	26,626	52.8%	12,711	69.9%	13,915	26,626	9,916								50,457
Dorset North	DOR	SW	Con	Con	30,058	58.1%	11,380	76.6%	30,058	2,710	18,678							294	51,740
Dorset South	DOR	SW	Con	Con	28,631	57.1%	15,098	72.7%	28,631	7,831	13,533							151	50,146
Dorset West	DOR	SW	Con	Con	27,030	59.7%	13,952	74.2%	27,030	5,168	13,078								45,276
Dover	KEN	SE	Con	Con	25,454	48.3%	9,220	77.6%	25,454	16,234	10,601							404	52,693
Dudley East	WMD	WM	Lab	Lab	24,441	45.8%	5,816	71.3%	18,625	24,441	10,272								53,338
Dudley West	WMD	WM	Con	Con	27,250	46.2%	8,723	75.9%	27,250	18,527	13,251								59,028
Dulwich	LND	LND	Lab	Con	15,424	40.5%	1,859	67.2%	15,424	13,565	8,376							674	38,039
Dumbarton	SCT	SCT		Lab	15,810	36.7%	2,115	75.1%	13,695	15,810	9,813	3,768							43,086
Dumfries	SCT	SCT	Con	Con	18,730	44.5%	8,694	73.0%	18,730	8,764	10,036	4,527							42,057
Dundee East	SCT	SCT	SNP	SNP	20,276	43.8%	5,016	73.7%	7,712	15,260	3,546	20,276							46,794
Dundee West	SCT	SCT	Lab	Lab	20,288	43.5%	10,150	74.4%	10,138	20,288	7,976	7,973						302	46,677
Dunfermline East	SCT	SCT		Lab	18,515	51.5%	11,301	72.0%	6,764	18,515	7,214	2,573						864	35,930
Dunfermline West	SCT	SCT		Lab	12,998	36.0%	2,474	73.5%	10,524	12,998	9,434	2,798						321	49,075
Durham North	DUR	NE		Lab	26,404	51.0%	13,437	72.7%	12,418	26,404	12,967								51,789
Ealing Acton	LND	LND		Con	22,051	49.2%	10,092	72.2%	22,051	11,959	10,593							192	44,795
Ealing North	LND	LND	Con	Con	23,128	45.1%	6,291	74.8%	23,128	16,837	11,021							306	51,298
Ealing Southall	LND	LND		Lab	26,664	52.3%	11,116	71.4%	15,548	26,664	8,059							705	50,976
Easington	DUR	NE	Lab	Lab	25,912	59.4%	14,792	67.5%	7,342	25,912	11,120								44,374
East Angus	SCT	SCT		Con	19,218	44.1%	3,527	73.5%	19,218	3,497	4,978	15,691						239	43,623
East Antrim	NIR	NIR		UUP	14,293	37.4%	367	65.1%					14,293	13,926	1,047			8,942	38,154
East Berkshire	BRK	SE		Con	33,967	56.8%	16,099	73.3%	33,967	7,953	17,868								59,789
East Kilbride	SCT	SCT	Lab	Lab	17,535	37.1%	4,336	77.0%	11,483	17,535	13,199	4,795						256	47,268
East Lindsey	LIN	EM		Con	27,151	53.2%	7,517	73.2%	27,151	4,229	19,634								51,014
East Londonderry	NIR	NIR		UUP	19,469	37.9%	7,262	76.3%					19,469	12,207	9,397		7,073	3,220	51,366
East Lothian	SCT	SCT		Lab	20,934	43.9%	6,241	76.4%	14,693	20,934	9,950	2,083							47,660
East Surrey	SRY	SE	Con	Con	27,272	62.9%	15,436	74.1%	27,272	4,249	11,836								43,357
Eastbourne	SXE	SE	Con	Con	31,501	59.1%	13,486	73.0%	31,501	3,790	18,015								53,306
Eastleigh	HAM	SE	Con	Con	32,393	51.0%	13,008	77.0%	32,393	11,736	19,385								63,514
Eastwood	SCT	SCT		Con	21,072	46.5%	8,595	72.6%	21,072	9,083	12,477	2,618							45,250
Eccles	GTM	NW	Lab	Lab	21,644	45.9%	6,005	70.1%	15,639	21,644	9,392							485	47,160
Eddisbury	CHS	NW		Con	28,407	53.5%	14,846	74.8%	28,407	11,169	13,561								53,137
Edinburgh Central	SCT	SCT	Lab	Con	14,095	38.0%	2,566	64.9%	14,095	11,529	9,498	1,810						119	37,051
Edinburgh East	SCT	SCT	Lab	Lab	16,169	44.9%	5,866	70.4%	10,303	16,169	7,570	1,976							36,018
Edinburgh Leith	SCT	SCT	Lab	Lab	16,177	39.7%	4,973	67.3%	10,706	16,177	11,204	2,646							40,733
Edinburgh Pentlands	SCT	SCT	Con	Con	17,051	39.1%	4,309	73.4%	17,051	10,390	12,742	2,642						687	43,512
Edinburgh South	SCT	SCT	Con	Con	16,485	36.8%	3,655	71.7%	16,485	12,824	12,830	2,256						560	44,845
Edinburgh West	SCT	SCT	Con	Con	17,646	38.2%	498	75.7%	17,646	9,313	17,148	2,126							46,233
Edmonton	LND	LND	Lab	Con	18,968	42.5%	1,193	68.9%	18,968	17,775	7,523							372	44,638
Ellesmere Port and Neston	CHS	NW		Con	24,371	45.9%	7,087	75.8%	24,371	17,284	11,413								53,068
Elmet	WYK	YTH		Con	23,909	47.3%	7,856	75.4%	23,909	16,053	10,589								50,551
Eltham	LND	LND		Con	19,530	47.9%	7,592	74.1%	19,530	11,938	9,030							276	40,774
Enfield North	LND	LND	Con	Con	25,456	51.7%	11,716	72.4%	25,456	13,740	9,452							588	49,236
Enfield Southgate	LND	LND	Con	Con	26,451	58.1%	15,819	69.6%	26,451	8,132	10,632							318	51,365
Epping Forest	ESS	E	Con	Con	27,373	56.5%	15,378	72.0%	27,373	8,289	11,995							782	48,439
Epsom and Ewell	SRY	SE	Con	Con	30,737	60.4%	17,195	72.0%	30,737	6,587	13,542								50,866
Erewash	DBY	EM		Con	25,167	45.3%	11,319	75.7%	25,167	13,848	12,331							4,158	55,504
Erith and Thamesmead	LND	LND	Lab	Con	15,289	37.1%	920	73.5%	15,289	11,260	14,369							272	41,190
Esher	SRY	SE	Con	Con	28,577	63.3%	15,912	73.1%	28,577	3,250	12,665							664	45,156
Exeter	DEV	SW	Con	Con	26,660	46.5%	9,880	78.0%	26,660	13,088	16,780							779	57,307
Falkirk East	SCT	SCT		Lab	17,956	47.7%	10,061	72.3%	7,895	17,956	6,967	4,490						334	37,642
Falkirk West	SCT	SCT		Lab	16,668	45.6%	8,978	74.0%	7,690	16,668	7,477	4,739							38,497
Falmouth and Camborne	CUL	SW	Con	Con	24,614	50.0%	11,025	75.0%	24,614	10,446	13,589							582	48,649
Fareham	HAM	SE	Con	Con	32,762	61.8%	16,316	73.7%	32,762	3,808	16,446								53,016
Faversham	KEN	SE	Con	Con	29,849	53.1%	14,597	73.5%	29,849	11,130	15,252								56,233
Feltham and Heston	LND	LND	Lab	Con	23,724	43.4%	2,148	69.8%	23,724	21,576	8,706							696	54,702
Fermanagh and South Tyrone	NIR	NIR	Ind	UUP	28,630	47.6%	7,676	88.6%					28,630		9,923		20,954	649	60,156
Finchley	LND	LND	Con	Con	19,616	51.1%	9,314	69.0%	19,616	10,302	7,763							736	38,417
Folkestone and Hythe	KEN	SE	Con	Con	27,261	56.9%	11,670	69.6%	27,261	4,700	15,591							318	47,870
Foyle	NIR	NIR		SDLP	24,071	46.0%	8,148	77.6%						15,923	24,071		10,607	1,690	52,291
Fulham	LND	LND	Con	Con	18,204	46.2%	4,798	76.1%	18,204	13,415	9,174							608	39,421
Fylde	LAN	NW		Con	27,879	62.9%	17,102	71.2%	27,879	4,821	10,777							863	44,340
Gainsborough and Horncastle	LIN	EM		Con	25,625	50.9%	5,067	75.0%	25,625	3,886	20,558								50,069
Galloway and Upper Nithsdale	SCT	SCT		Con	17,579	44.7%	5,461	75.8%	17,579	4,464	5,129	12,118							39,290
Gateshead East	TWR	NE	Lab	Lab	22,981	48.3%	10,322	69.6%	12,659	22,981	11,920								47,560
Gedling	NTT	EM		Con	27,207	54.1%	14,664	75.4%	27,207	10,330	12,543							186	50,080
Gillingham	KEN	SE	Con	Con	26,381	51.7%	10,843	73.6%	26,381	9,084	15,538								51,003
Glanford and Scunthorpe	HUM	YTH		Con	20,356	38.5%	637	73.5%	20,356	19,719	12,819								52,894
Glasgow Cathcart	SCT	SCT	Lab	Lab	16,037	41.4%	4,230	75.8%	11,807	16,037	8,710	2,151							38,705
Glasgow Central	SCT	SCT	Lab	Lab	17,066	53.0%	10,962	62.8%	6,104	17,066	5,366	3,300						347	32,183
Glasgow Garscadden	SCT	SCT	Lab	Lab	19,635	56.2%	13,474	69.1%	5,368	19,635	6,161	3,566						218	34,948
Glasgow Govan	SCT	SCT	Lab	Lab	20,370	55.0%	13,057	71.6%	7,180	20,370	7,313	2,207							37,070
Glasgow Hillhead	SCT	SCT	Lab	SDP	14,856	36.2%	1,164	71.9%	13,692	9,678	14,856	2,203						627	41,056
Glasgow Maryhill	SCT	SCT	Lab	Lab	18,724	55.2%	11,203	65.5%	5,014	18,724	7,521	2,408						274	33,941
Glasgow Pollok	SCT	SCT	Lab	Lab	18,973	52.2%	11,532	68.2%	7,441	18,973	6,308	3,585							36,307
Glasgow Provan	SCT	SCT	Lab	Lab	20,040	64.4%	15,385	65.2%	3,374	20,040	4,655	2,737						294	31,100
Glasgow Rutherglen	SCT	SCT	Lab	Lab	21,510	48.3%	9,126	75.2%	8,017	21,510	12,384	2,438						148	44,497
Glasgow Shettleston	SCT	SCT	Lab	Lab	19,203	54.2%	12,416	68.3%	6,787	19,203	6,568	2,801						103	35,462
Glasgow Shettleston	SCT	SCT	Lab	Lab	22,481	64.7%	17,599	65.1%	4,565	22,481	4,882	2,804							34,732
Gloucester	GLS	SW	Con	Con	27,235	48.5%	12,537	75.6%	27,235	14,698	13,499							739	56,171
Gordon	SCT	SCT		Lib	20,134	43.8%	850	70.1%	19,284	3,899	20,134	2,636							45,953
Gosport	HAM	SE	Con	Con	28,179	60.6%	14,451	71.6%	28,179	4,319	13,728							241	46,467
Gower	WGM	WLS	Lab	Lab	16,972	38.1%	1,205	78.7%	15,767	16,972	10,416					1,444			44,599
Gravesham	KEN	SE		Con	25,968	47.0%	8,463	77.6%	25,968	17,505	10,826	2,636						915	55,214
Great Grimsby	HUM	YTH	Lab	Lab	18,330	36.3%	731	73.8%	17,599	18,330	14,552								50,481
Great Yarmouth	NFK	E	Con	Con	22,423	50.5%	11,200	70.8%	22,423	11,223	10,803								44,449
Greenock and Port Glasgow	SCT	SCT	Lab	Lab	20,650	46.8%	4,625	74.2%	4,314	20,650	16,025	2,989						114	44,092
Greenwich	LND	LND	Lab	Lab	13,361	38.2%	1,211	67.7%	12,150	13,361	8,783							650	35,194
Guildford	SRY	SE	Con	Con	30,016	55.1%	11,824	72.5%	30,016	5,853	18,192							425	54,486
Hackney North and Stoke Newington	LND	LND	Lab	Lab	18,989	52.0%	8,545	54.7%	10,444	18,989	5,746							1,314	36,493
Hackney South and Shoreditch	LND	LND	Lab	Lab	16,621	43.3%	7,691	53.8%	8,930	16,621	10,749							2,058	38,358
Halesowen and Stourbridge	WMD	WM	Con	Con	28,520	48.4%	13,316	76.4%	28,520	14,611	14,934							582	58,377
Halifax	WYK	YTH	Lab	Con	22,321	40.9%	1,869	75.1%	22,321	20,452	11,868								54,641
Halton	CHS	NW		Lab	24,752	46.4%	6,829	73.3%	17,923	24,752	10,649								53,324
Hamilton	SCT	SCT	Lab	Lab	24,384	52.4%	14,749	75.7%	8,940	24,384	9,635	3,816							46,775
Hammersmith	LND	LND		Lab	13,645	41.5%	1,954	71.3%	11,691	13,645	6,837							729	32,902
Hampshire East	HAM	SE		Con	36,968	62.8%	18,327	74.2%	36,968	3,247	18,641								58,856
Hampstead and Highgate	LND	LND		Con	18,366	41.2%	3,370	66.9%	18,366	14,996	11,030							156	44,548
Harborough	LEI	EM	Con	Con	32,957	60.1%	18,485	75.9%	32,957	6,285	14,472							1,082	54,796
Harlow	ESS	E	Lab	Con	21,924	41.1%	3,674	76.5%	21,924	18,250	12,891							256	53,321
Harrogate	NYK	YTH	Con	Con	30,269	60.2%	15,888	69.0%	30,269	5,128	14,381							479	50,257
Harrow East	LND	LND	Con	Con	28,834	49.8%	12,668	72.5%	28,834	12,941	16,166								57,941
Harrow West	LND	LND	Con	Con	28,056	53.0%	11,021	72.3%	28,056	7,811	17,035								52,902
Hartlepool	CLV	NE	Lab	Lab	22,048	45.5%	3,090	69.8%	18,958	22,048	7,422								48,434
Harwich	ESS	E	Con	Con	27,422	54.1%	12,502	70.2%	27,422	8,302	14,920								50,644
Hastings and Rye	SXE	SE		Con	25,626	53.3%	10,980	68.9%	25,626	7,304	14,646							503	48,079
Havant	HAM	SE		Con	29,148	55.3%	11,956	72.1%	29,148	6,335	17,192								52,675
Hayes and Harlington	LND	LND	Lab	Con	16,451	40.3%	4,234	70.9%	16,451	12,217	11,842							324	40,834
Hazel Grove	GTM	NW	Con	Con	22,627	46.1%	2,022	77.2%	22,627	5,895	20,605								49,127
Hemsworth	WYK	YTH	Lab	Lab	22,081	59.3%	14,190	68.6%	7,291	22,081	7,891								37,263
Hendon North	LND	LND	Con	Con	18,499	49.9%	9,025	68.0%	18,499	8,786	9,474							310	37,068
Hendon South	LND	LND	Con	Con	17,115	48.6%	6,433	65.3%	17,115	7,415	10,682								35,210
Henley	OXF	SE	Con	Con	27,039	59.7%	13,781	72.9%	27,039	4,282	13,258							730	45,309
Hereford	HWR	WM	Con	Con	23,334	48.1%	2,277	75.8%	23,334	3,690	21,057							463	48,544
Hertford and Stortford	HRT	E	Con	Con	29,039	56.0%	12,929	75.6%	29,039	6,203	16,110							525	51,877
Hertsmere	HRT	E		Con	28,628	53.2%	14,870	73.7%	28,628	10,315	13,758							1,116	53,817
Hexham	NBL	NE	Con	Con	21,374	51.5%	8,308	73.4%	21,374	7,056	13,066								41,496
Heywood and Middleton	GTM	NW		Lab	18,111	43.3%	3,974	69.9%	14,137	18,111	9,262							316	41,826
High Peak	DBY	EM	Con	Con	24,534	46.4%	9,940	78.5%	24,534	13,755	14,594								52,883
Holborn and St Pancras	LND	LND		Lab	20,486	47.5%	7,259	60.2%	13,227	20,486	9,242							155	43,110
Holland with Boston	LIN	EM	Con	Con	24,962	55.2%	11,736	71.0%	24,962	6,970	13,226								63,562
Honiton	DEV	SW	Con	Con	32,602	60.6%	14,769	74.5%	32,602	3,377	17,833								53,812
Hornchurch	LND	LND	Con	Con	21,393	47.0%	9,184	73.7%	21,393	12,209	11,251							621	45,474
Hornsey and Wood Green	LND	LND		Con	22,323	42.4%	3,899	71.2%	22,323	18,424	10,995							854	52,596
Horsham	WSX	SE		Con	37,897	63.2%	21,785	74.5%	37,897	4,999	16,112							925	59,933
Houghton and Washington	TWR	NE		Lab	26,168	51.7%	13,821	66.9%	12,104	26,168	12,347								50,619
Hove	SXE	SE	Con	Con	28,628	60.5%	17,219	65.8%	28,628	6,550	11,409							713	47,300
Huddersfield	WYK	YTH		Lab	20,051	41.4%	3,955	71.1%	16,096	20,051	12,027							271	48,445
Huntingdon	CAM	E		Con	34,254	62.4%	20,348	71.6%	34,254	6,317	13,906							444	54,921
Hyndburn	LAN	NW		Con	19,405	42.2%	21	77.4%	19,405	19,384	6,716							435	45,940
Ilford North	LND	LND	Con	Con	22,042	51.3%	11,201	71.3%	22,042	10,841	10,052								42,935
Ilford South	LND	LND	Con	Con	18,672	45.5%	4,566	70.6%	18,672	14,106	7,999							235	41,012
Inverness East, Nairn and Lochaber	SCT	SCT		Lib	20,671	46.0%	7,298	70.5%	13,373	6,448	20,671	4,395							44,887
Ipswich	SFK	E	Lab	Lab	22,191	43.7%	1,077	75.4%	21,114	22,191	7,220							235	50,760
Isle of Wight	IOW	SE	Con	Lib	38,407	51.0%	3,503	80.0%	34,904	1,828	38,407							208	75,347
Islington North	LND	LND	Lab	Lab	14,951	40.4%	5,607	66.5%	9,344	14,951	8,268							4,401	36,964
Islington South and Finsbury	LND	LND	Lab	Lab	13,460	36.3%	363	62.0%	9,894	13,460	13,097							622	37,073
Islwyn	GNT	WLS		Lab	23,183	59.4%	14,380	77.7%	5,511	23,183	8,803					1,574			39,071
Jarrow	TWR	NE	Lab	Lab	25,151	55.3%	13,877	71.4%	11,274	25,151	9,094								45,519
Keighley	WYK	YTH	Lab	Con	21,370	42.6%	2,774	78.9%	21,370	18,596	9,951							302	50,216
Kettering	NTH	EM	Lab	Con	23,223	48.4%	8,586	76.4%	23,223	10,119	14,637								47,979
Kensington and Chelsea	LND	LND	Con	Con	14,274	46.0%	5,101	62.3%	14,274	9,173	6,873							735	31,055
Kilmarnock and Loudoun	SCT	SCT		Lab	20,250	43.6%	8,800	75.6%	11,450	20,250	10,545	4,165							46,410
Kincardine and Deeside	SCT	SCT		Con	20,293	47.7%	7,796	71.5%	20,293	6,472	12,497	3,297							45,559
Kingston upon Hull East	HUM	YTH	Lab	Lab	23,615	49.9%	10,074	67.6%	13,541	23,615	10,172								47,328
Kingston upon Hull North	HUM	YTH		Lab	21,365	42.5%	6,028	67.5%	15,337	21,365	13,381							222	50,301
Kingston upon Hull West	HUM	YTH	Lab	Lab	15,361	41.9%	3,654	63.5%	11,707	15,361	9,575								36,643
Kingston upon Thames	LND	LND	Con	Con	22,094	54.1%	8,872	71.9%	22,094	4,977	13,222							549	40,842
Kingswood	AVN	SW	Con	Con	22,573	40.4%	1,797	77.5%	22,573	20,776	12,591								55,940
Kirkcaldy	SCT	SCT	Lab	Lab	15,380	40.3%	5,331	71.9%	10,049	15,380	9,274	3,452							53,078
Knowsley North	MSY	NW		Lab	24,949	64.5%	17,191	69.5%	7,758	24,949	5,715							246	38,668
Knowsley South	MSY	NW		Lab	25,727	53.7%	11,769	70.3%	13,958	25,727	8,173								47,858
Lagan Valley	NIR	NIR		UUP	24,017	59.2%	17,216	67.6%					24,017	6,801	2,603		1,751	5,402	40,574
Lancaster	LAN	NW	Con	Con	21,050	50.3%	10,636	74.5%	21,050	10,414	10,214							179	41,857
Langbaurgh	CLV	NE		Con	24,239	41.7%	6,024	75.0%	24,239	18,215	15,615								58,069
Leeds Central	WYK	YTH		Lab	18,706	47.9%	8,222	61.7%	9,181	18,706	10,484							645	39,039
Leeds East	WYK	YTH	Lab	Lab	18,450	43.8%	6,095	66.3%	12,355	18,450	10,884							475	42,164
Leeds North East	WYK	YTH	Con	Con	21,940	47.6%	8,995	70.7%	21,940	10,951	12,945							251	46,087
Leeds North West	WYK	YTH	Con	Con	22,579	46.6%	8,537	71.3%	22,579	10,757	14,042							1,110	48,488
Leeds West	WYK	YTH	Lab	Lib	17,908	38.4%	2,048	69.0%	12,515	15,860	17,908							334	46,617
Leicester East	LEI	EM	Lab	Con	19,117	38.9%	933	73.2%	19,117	18,184	10,362							1,429	49,092
Leicester South	LEI	EM	Lab	Con	21,424	40.3%	7	72.3%	21,424	21,417	9,410							645	53,187
Leicester West	LEI	EM	Lab	Lab	20,837	44.8%	1,712	68.8%	19,125	20,837	5,935							936	53,187
Leigh	GTM	NW	Lab	Lab	25,477	51.2%	12,314	72.2%	13,163	25,477	10,468								49,108
Leominster	HWR	WM	Con	Con	29,276	57.0%	9,786	77.5%	29,276	1,932	19,490							668	51,366
Lewes	SXE	SE	Con	Con	29,261	58.4%	13,904	74.3%	29,261	4,244	15,357							1,221	50,083
Lewisham Deptford	LND	LND	Lab	Lab	17,360	48.3%	6,032	61.2%	11,328	17,360	6,734							490	35,912
Lewisham East	LND	LND	Lab	Con	17,168	40.4%	1,909	69.5%	17,168	15,259	9,351							764	42,538
Lewisham West	LND	LND	Lab	Con	19,521	44.0%	2,506	70.3%	19,521	17,015	7,470							336	44,342
Leyton	LND	LND	Lab	Lab	16,504	43.5%	4,516	65.7%	11,988	16,504	9,448								37,940
Lincoln	LIN	EM	Con	Con	25,244	46.4%	10,286	74.6%	25,244	14,958	13,631							523	54,356
Linlithgow	SCT	SCT		Lab	19,694	45.1%	11,361	75.2%	8,333	19,694	7,432	8,026						199	43,684
Littleborough and Saddleworth	GTM	NW		Con	20,510	42.8%	5,650	74.8%	20,510	12,106	14,860							398	47,874
Liverpool Broadgreen	MSY	NW		Lab	18,802	40.9%	3,800	72.1%	15,002	18,802	12,190								45,994
Liverpool Garston	MSY	NW	Con	Lab	21,450	46.6%	4,002	71.6%	17,448	21,450	7,153								46,051
Liverpool Mossley Hill	MSY	NW		Lib	18,845	40.9%	4,195	73.4%	14,650	12,352	18,845							212	46,059
Liverpool Riverside	MSY	NW		Lab	24,978	64.9%	17,378	45.1%	7,600	24,978	5,381							495	38,454
Liverpool Walton	MSY	NW	Lab	Lab	26,980	52.7%	14,115	69.6%	12,865	26,980	10,970							343	51,158
Liverpool West Derby	MSY	NW	Lab	Lab	23,905	54.5%	11,843	69.5%	12,062	23,905	7,871								43,838
Livingston	SCT	SCT		Lab	14,255	37.7%	4,951	70.9%	9,129	14,255	9,304	5,090							37,778
Llanelli	DFD	WLS	Lab	Lab	23,207	48.2%	13,606	75.4%	9,601	23,207	9,076					5,880		371	48,135
Loughborough	LEI	EM	Con	Con	29,056	52.9%	16,180	77.7%	29,056	12,876	12,189							819	54,940
Ludlow	SAL	WM	Con	Con	26,278	55.7%	11,303	74.6%	26,278	5,949	14,975								47,652
Luton North	BDF	E		Con	26,115	48.3%	11,981	77.4%	26,115	14,134	13,769								54,018
Luton South	BDF	E		Con	22,531	41.9%	4,621	75.8%	22,531	17,910	13,395								53,836
Macclesfield	CHS	NW	Con	Con	32,528	59.4%	20,679	75.0%	32,528	9,923	11,859							488	54,808
Maidstone	KEN	SE	Con	Con	26,420	50.9%	7,226	73.8%	26,420	6,280	19,194								51,895
Makerfield	GTM	NW		Lab	25,114	49.3%	10,876	73.7%	14,238	25,114	11,633								50,985
Manchester Blackley	GTM	NW	Lab	Lab	20,132	48.1%	6,456	69.7%	13,676	20,132	8,081								41,889
Manchester Central	GTM	NW	Lab	Lab	27,353	65.3%	18,485	60.6%	8,868	27,353	4,956							729	41,906
Manchester Gorton	GTM	NW	Lab	Lab	27,353	51.2%	9,965	67.9%	12,495	22,460	8,348							564	43,867
Manchester Withington	GTM	NW	Con	Con	18,329	39.2%	2,373	72.3%	18,329	15,956	12,231							184	46,700
Manchester Wythenshawe	GTM	NW	Lab	Lab	23,172	54.6%	10,684	69.6%	12,488	23,172	6,766								42,426
Mansfield	NTT	EM	Lab	Lab	18,670	40.5%	2,216	70.7%	16,454	18,670	11,036								46,160
Medway	KEN	SE		Con	22,507	48.9%	8,656	72.6%	22,507	13,851	9,658								46,016
Meirionnydd Nant Conwy	CON	WLS		PC	9,709	39.2%	2,643	81.3%	7,066	3,735	4,254					9,709			24,764
Meriden	WMD	WM	Con	Con	28,474	53.7%	15,018	71.6%	28,474	13,456	10,674							460	53,064
Merthyr Tydfil and Rhymney	GNT	WLS		Lab	29,053	67.3%	22,730	72.5%	5,449	29,053	6,323					2,058		256	43,139
Mid Bedfordshire	BDF	E	Con	Con	33,042	56.9%	17,381	76.9%	33,042	9,420	15,661								58,123
Mid Kent	KEN	SE		Con	25,400	53.5%	12,543	71.4%	25,400	8,928	12,857							324	47,509
Mid Norfolk	NFK	E		Con	29,032	55.9%	15,515	75.3%	29,032	8,950	13,517							405	51,904
Mid Staffordshire	STS	WM		Con	27,210	52.1%	13,880	77.5%	27,210	11,720	13,330								52,260
Mid Sussex	WSX	SE	Con	Con	35,310	61.4%	16,744	74.7%	35,310	3,470	18,566							196	57,542
Mid Ulster	NIR	NIR	UUUP	DUP	16,174	30.0%	78	84.3%					7,066	16,174	12,044		16,096	2,501	53,881
Mid Worcestershire	HWR	WM		Con	28,159	50.9%	14,205	74.6%	28,159	14,954	12,866							386	56,365
Middlesbrough	CLV	NE	Lab	Lab	21,220	50.7%	9,669	66.4%	11,551	21,220	8,871							207	41,849
Midlothian	SCT	SCT	Lab	Lab	19,401	42.7%	6,156	75.0%	9,922	19,401	13,245	2,826							45,394
Milton Keynes	BKM	SE		Con	28,181	48.0%	11,522	74.0%	28,181	13,045	16,659							784	58,669
Mitcham and Morden	LND	LND	Lab	Con	19,827	42.7%	6,451	73.1%	19,827	13,376	12,720							539	46,462
Mole Valley	SRY	SE		Con	29,691	60.8%	14,718	75.0%	29,691	4,147	14,973								48,811
Monklands East	SCT	SCT		Lab	18,358	51.2%	9,799	73.1%	8,559	18,358	5,721	3,185							35,823
Monklands West	SCT	SCT		Lab	20,642	54.2%	12,264	75.7%	8,378	20,642	6,605	2,473							38,098
Monmouth	GNT	WLS	Con	Con	21,746	49.2%	9,343	78.8%	21,746	9,593	12,403					493			44,235
Montgomeryshire	POW	WLS	Con	Lib	12,863	43.3%	668	79.2%	12,195	2,550	12,863					1,585		487	29,680
Moray	SCT	SCT		Con	16,944	39.2%	1,713	71.1%	16,944	3,139	7,901	15,231							43,215
Morecambe and Lunesdale	LAN	NW		Con	21,968	56.6%	12,194	72.9%	21,968	6,882	9,774							208	38,832
Morley and Leeds South	WYK	YTH		Lab	18,995	45.9%	5,854	67.9%	13,141	18,995	9,216								41,352
Motherwell North	SCT	SCT		Lab	24,483	57.8%	17,894	75.0%	6,589	24,483	5,970	5,333							42,375
Motherwell South	SCT	SCT		Lab	19,939	52.4%	12,349	72.9%	7,590	19,939	6,754	3,743							38,026
Neath	WGM	WLS	Lab	Lab	22,670	53.6%	13,604	76.5%	7,350	22,670	9,066					3,046		150	42,282
New Forest	HAM	SE	Con	Con	34,157	66.4%	20,925	62.1%	34,157	4,075	13,232								51,464
Newark	NTT	EM	Con	Con	26,334	53.8%	14,283	76.4%	26,334	12,051	10,076							463	48,924
Newbury	BRK	SE	Con	Con	31,836	59.3%	13,038	75.2%	31,836	3,027	18,798								53,661
Newcastle upon Tyne Central	TWR	NE	Lab	Con	18,161	40.8%	2,228	71.0%	18,161	15,933	9,923							478	44,495
Newcastle upon Tyne East	TWR	NE	Lab	Lab	19,247	45.5%	7,492	71.0%	11,755	19,247	11,293								42,295
Newcastle upon Tyne North	TWR	NE	Con	Lab	18,985	37.6%	2,556	72.8%	16,429	18,985	15,136								50,550
Newcastle-under-Lyme	STS	WM	Lab	Lab	21,210	42.0%	2,804	77.3%	18,406	21,210	10,916								50,532
Newham North East	LND	LND	Lab	Lab	19,282	49.7%	8,509	62.1%	10,773	19,282	7,943							794	38,792
Newham North West	LND	LND	Lab	Lab	13,042	46.6%	6,918	56.2%	6,124	13,042	5,204							3,599	27,969
Newham South	LND	LND	Lab	Lab	13,561	50.2%	7,311	53.6%	6,212	13,561	6,250							993	27,016
Newport East	GNT	WLS		Lab	15,931	39.6%	2,630	76.6%	13,301	15,931	10,293					697			40,222
Newport West	GNT	WLS		Con	15,948	38.0%	581	77.5%	15,948	15,367	10,163					477			41,955
Newry and Armagh	NIR	NIR		UUP	18,988	40.0%	1,554	76.0%					18,988		17,434		9,928	1,070	47,420
Normanton	WYK	YTH	Lab	Lab	18,782	43.6%	4,183	70.4%	14,599	18,782	9,741								43,122
North Antrim	NIR	NIR	DUP	DUP	13,173	54.2%	13,173	69.8%					10,749	23,922	6,193		2,860	451	44,175
North Bedfordshire	BDF	E		Con	27,969	52.0%	13,849	75.2%	27,969	11,323	14,120							344	53,756
North Colchester	ESS	E		Con	29,921	53.0%	15,048	73.1%	29,921	10,397	14,873							1,294	56,485
North Devon	DEV	SW	Con	Con	28,066	55.1%	8,727	80.1%	28,066	2,893	19,339							669	50,967
North Down	NIR	NIR	Ind	UPUP	22,861	56.1%	13,846	66.2%					8,261		645			31,876	40,782
North East Cambridgeshire	CAM	E		Lib	26,936	50.5%	5,195	76.3%	21,741	4,625	26,936								53,302
North East Derbyshire	DBY	EM	Lab	Lab	21,094	40.8%	2,006	79.3%	19,088	21,094	11,494								51,676
North East Fife	SCT	SCT		Con	17,129	46.1%	2,185	73.7%	17,129	2,429	14,944	2,442						242	37,186
North Hertfordshire	HRT	E		Con	29,302	49.0%	9,943	79.2%	29,302	11,104	19,359								59,765
North Norfolk	NFK	E	Con	Con	26,230	54.0%	13,223	74.6%	26,230	9,317	13,007								48,554
North Tayside	SCT	SCT		Con	19,269	51.0%	10,099	72.6%	19,269	2,057	7,255	9,170							37,751
North Thanet	KEN	SE		Con	26,801	58.4%	14,051	70.0%	26,801	6,482	12,256							324	45,863
North Warwickshire	WAR	WM		Con	22,452	42.0%	2,585	78.0%	22,452	19,867	11,207								53,526
North West Durham	DUR	NE	Lab	Lab	19,135	44.6%	6,356	70.7%	12,779	19,135	11,008								42,923
North West Hampshire	HAM	SE		Con	28,044	57.3%	12,122	74.4%	28,044	4,957	15,922								48,923
North West Norfolk	NFK	E	Con	Con	23,358	43.5%	3,147	77.6%	23,358	10,139	20,211								53,708
North West Leicestershire	LEI	EM		Con	24,760	44.6%	6,662	81.1%	24,760	18,098	12,043							637	55,538
North West Surrey	SRY	SE	Con	Con	35,297	64.1%	21,018	70.2%	35,297	5,452	14,279								55,028
North Wiltshire	WIL	SW		Con	30,924	53.0%	7,232	76.6%	30,924	2,888	23,692							1,220	58,295
Northampton North	NTH	EM	Con	Con	23,129	47.0%	9,860	72.0%	23,129	13,269	12,829								49,227
Northampton South	NTH	EM	Con	Con	26,824	53.6%	15,126	72.6%	26,824	11,533	11,698								50,055
Northavon	AVN	SW		Con	30,790	53.7%	12,983	78.0%	30,790	8,243	17,807							499	57,339
Norwich North	NFK	E	Lab	Con	21,355	44.7%	5,879	76.2%	21,355	15,476	10,796							194	47,821
Norwich South	NFK	E	Lab	Con	18,998	38.8%	1,712	76.4%	18,998	17,286	11,968							704	48,956
Norwood	LND	LND	Lab	Lab	16,280	44.6%	2,883	65.6%	13,397	16,280	6,371							466	55,663
Nottingham East	NTT	EM	Lab	Con	17,641	40.4%	1,464	63.6%	17,641	16,177	8,385							1,421	43,624
Nottingham North	NTT	EM	Lab	Con	18,730	39.5%	362	66.1%	18,730	18,368	9,200							1,184	47,482
Nottingham South	NTT	EM		Con	22,238	45.9%	5,715	70.2%	22,238	16,523	9,697								48,458
Nuneaton	WAR	WM	Lab	Con	20,666	40.5%	5,061	77.3%	20,666	15,605	14,264							504	51,039
Ogmore	MGM	WLS	Lab	Lab	23,390	59.2%	17,364	76.9%	5,806	23,390	6,026					3,124		1,161	39,507
Old Bexley and Sidcup	LND	LND		Con	22,442	60.2%	12,738	74.2%	22,442	5,116	9,704								37,262
Oldham Central and Royton	GTM	NW		Lab	18,611	41.4%	3,312	66.9%	15,299	18,611	11,022								44,932
Oldham West	GTM	NW	Lab	Lab	17,690	44.1%	3,180	69.9%	14,510	17,690	7,745							180	40,125
Orkney and Shetland	SCT	SCT	Lib	Lib	9,374	45.9%	4,150	67.8%	5,224	2,665	9,374	3,147							20,410
Orpington	LND	LND	Con	Con	25,569	57.3%	10,151	76.0%	25,569	3,439	15,418							215	44,641
Oxford East	OXF	SE		Con	18,808	40.0%	1,267	73.9%	18,808	17,541	10,690								47,039
Oxford West and Abingdon	OXF	SE		Con	23,778	47.7%	7,151	74.0%	23,778	8,440	16,627							1,018	49,863
Paisley North	SCT	SCT		Lab	15,782	45.6%	7,587	68.6%	7,425	15,782	8,195	2,783						439	34,624
Paisley South	SCT	SCT		Lab	15,633	41.4%	6,529	72.5%	7,819	15,633	9,104	4,918						271	37,745
Peckham	LND	LND	Lab	Lab	16,616	51.6%	8,824	54.5%	7,792	16,616	7,006							800	32,214
Pembrokeshire	DFD	WLS	Con	Con	24,860	46.9%	9,356	76.1%	24,860	15,504	10,983					1,073		614	53,034
Pendle	LAN	NW		Con	22,739	44.2%	6,135	79.7%	22,739	16,604	12,056								51,399
Penrith and The Border	CMA	NW	Con	Con	29,304	58.8%	15,421	73.1%	29,304	6,612	13,883								49,799
Perth and Kinross	SCT	SCT		Con	17,888	40.2%	6,733	72.3%	17,888	4,414	10,997	11,155							44,454
Peterborough	CAM	E	Con	Con	27,270	47.1%	10,439	73.3%	27,270	16,831	13,142							666	57,909
Plymouth Devonport	DEV	SW	Lab	SDP	20,843	44.3%	4,936	76.1%	15,907	9,845	20,843							415	47,010
Plymouth Drake	DEV	SW	Con	Con	19,718	50.7%	8,585	74.3%	19,718	7,921	11,133							163	38,935
Plymouth Sutton	DEV	SW	Con	Con	25,203	55.1%	11,687	76.4%	25,203	6,358	13,516							470	45,726
Pontefract and Castleford	WYK	YTH	Lab	Lab	24,990	57.1%	13,691	67.4%	11,299	24,990	7,452								43,741
Pontypridd	MGM	WLS	Lab	Lab	20,188	45.6%	8,744	72.7%	10,139	20,188	11,444					2,065		449	44,285
Poole	DOR	SW	Con	Con	30,358	58.3%	14,429	73.6%	30,358	5,595	15,929							177	52,059
Portsmouth North	HAM	SE	Con	Con	31,413	55.3%	17,999	72.9%	31,413	12,013	13,414								56,840
Portsmouth South	HAM	SE	Con	Con	25,101	50.0%	12,335	67.3%	25,101	11,324	12,766							1,005	50,196
Preston	LAN	NW		Con	21,810	46.7%	6,978	71.8%	14,832	21,810	10,039								46,681
Pudsey	WYK	YTH	Con	Con	24,455	45.7%	5,314	75.8%	24,455	9,542	19,141							387	55,525
Putney	LND	LND	Con	Con	21,863	46.5%	5,019	73.6%	21,863	16,844	7,668							609	46,984
Ravensbourne	LND	LND	Con	Con	27,143	63.0%	15,512	73.2%	27,143	4,037	11,631							242	43,055
Reading East	BRK	SE		Con	24,516	51.6%	11,508	70.4%	24,516	9,218	13,008							779	47,512
Reading West	BRK	SE		Con	24,948	52.1%	11,399	72.5%	24,948	9,220	13,549							161	47,878
Redcar	CLV	NE	Lab	Lab	18,348	40.6%	3,104	71.3%	15,244	18,348	11,614								45,206
Reigate	SRY	SE	Con	Con	29,932	59.0%	16,307	72.1%	29,932	6,114	13,625							1,029	50,700
Renfrew West and Inverclyde	SCT	SCT		Con	13,669	32.7%	1,322	78.1%	13,669	12,139	12,347	3,653							41,808
Rhondda	MGM	WLS	Lab	Lab	29,448	61.7%	21,370	76.2%	3,973	29,448	8,078					4,845		1,350	47,694
Ribble Valley	LAN	NW		Con	29,223	63.4%	18,591	76.8%	29,223	6,214	10,632								46,060
Richmond and Barnes	LND	LND		Con	20,695	46.5%	74	79.7%	20,695	3,156	20,621								44,472
Richmond (Yorks)	NYK	YTH	Con	Con	32,373	62.6%	18,066	68.7%	32,373	4,997	14,307								51,677
Rochdale	GTM	NW	Lib	Lib	21,858	46.1%	7,587	70.8%	10,616	14,271	21,858							667	47,412
Rochford	ESS	E		Con	29,495	57.8%	13,102	73.5%	29,495	5,105	16,393								50,993
Romford	LND	LND	Con	Con	20,771	53.4%	10,574	69.8%	20,771	7,494	10,197							432	38,894
Romsey and Waterside	HAM	SE		Con	30,361	56.6%	13,690	75.8%	30,361	6,604	16,671								53,636
Ross, Cromarty and Skye	SCT	SCT		SDP	13,528	38.5%	1,704	72.6%	11,824	4,901	13,528	4,863							35,036
Rossendale and Darwen	LAN	NW		Con	27,214	47.0%	8,821	77.8%	27,214	18,393	12,246								57,853
Rother Valley	SYK	YTH	Lab	Lab	21,781	46.5%	8,625	71.9%	13,156	21,781	11,903								46,840
Rotherham	SYK	YTH	Lab	Lab	22,236	54.3%	11,709	67.0%	10,527	22,236	8,192								40,955
Roxburgh and Berwickshire	SCT	SCT		Lib	15,920	50.3%	3,396	75.8%	12,524	2,326	15,920	852							31,622
Rugby and Kenilworth	WAR	WM		Con	29,622	50.9%	14,241	78.1%	29,622	13,180	15,381								58,223
Ruislip-Northwood	LND	LND	Con	Con	24,498	59.6%	12,982	72.9%	24,498	5,105	11,516								41,119
Rushcliffe	NTT	EM	Con	Con	33,253	61.5%	20,220	76.9%	33,253	7,290	13,033							518	54,094
Rutland and Melton	LEI	EM		Con	33,262	60.4%	18,353	73.3%	33,262	6,414	14,909							532	59,804
Ryedale	NYK	YTH		Con	33,312	59.2%	16,142	71.8%	33,312	5,816	17,170								56,298
Saffron Walden	ESS	E	Con	Con	30,869	57.8%	15,249	76.9%	30,869	6,078	15,620							797	53,364
Salford East	GTM	NW	Lab	Lab	21,373	53.7%	9,541	62.3%	11,832	21,373	6,190							417	39,812
Salisbury	WIL	SW	Con	Con	28,876	53.5%	7,174	72.8%	28,876	3,139	21,702							268	53,899
Scarborough	NYK	YTH	Con	Con	27,977	54.3%	13,929	71.3%	27,977	9,545	14,048								51,570
Sedgefield	DUR	NE		Lab	21,401	47.6%	8,281	72.9%	13,120	21,401	10,183							298	45,002
Selby	NYK	YTH		Con	26,712	56.7%	15,965	72.1%	26,712	9,687	10,747								47,146
Sevenoaks	KEN	SE	Con	Con	30,722	58.4%	15,706	73.7%	30,722	6,439	15,061							416	52,596
Sheffield Attercliffe	SYK	YTH	Lab	Lab	23,067	51.5%	11,612	69.7%	11,455	23,067	10,241								44,763
Sheffield Brightside	SYK	YTH	Lab	Lab	25,531	58.0%	15,209	65.5%	7,888	25,531	10,322							286	44,037
Sheffield Central	SYK	YTH		Lab	24,759	60.2%	16,790	61.6%	7,908	24,759	7,969							518	41,154
Sheffield Hallam	SYK	YTH	Con	Con	26,851	50.6%	11,774	72.8%	26,851	10,463	15,077							656	53,047
Sheffield Heeley	SYK	YTH	Lab	Lab	24,111	45.8%	8,368	70.5%	15,743	24,111	12,813								52,667
Sheffield Hillsborough	SYK	YTH	Lab	Lab	20,901	37.2%	1,546	75.4%	15,881	20,901	19,355								56,137
Sherwood	NTT	EM		Con	21,595	41.0%	658	76.3%	21,595	20,937	10,172								52,704
Shipley	WYK	YTH	Con	Con	25,866	49.7%	11,445	77.0%	25,866	11,218	14,421							521	52,026
Shoreham	WSX	SE	Con	Con	31,679	61.7%	15,766	73.7%	31,679	3,794	15,913								51,386
Shrewsbury and Atcham	SAL	WM	Con	Con	24,397	49.5%	8,624	74.0%	24,397	9,080	15,773								51,386
Shropshire North	SAL	WM		Con	28,496	53.4%	11,667	72.7%	28,496	7,860	16,829							135	53,320
Skipton and Ripon	NYK	YTH		Con	31,509	60.6%	15,046	74.9%	31,509	4,044	16,463								52,016
Slough	BRK	SE		Con	22,064	42.9%	3,106	71.5%	22,064	18,958	9,519							853	51,394
Solihull	WMD	WM	Con	Con	31,947	60.8%	17,394	71.4%	31,947	6,075	14,553								52,575
Somerton and Frome	SOM	SW		Con	26,988	54.4%	9,227	76.7%	26,988	4,867	17,761								49,616
South Antrim	NIR	NIR	UUP	UUP	17,727	45.7%	6,792	65.5%					17,727	10,935	3,377		1,629	5,161	38,829
South Colchester and Maldon	ESS	E		Con	31,296	53.6%	12,165	73.3%	31,296	7,932	19,131								58,359
South Derbyshire	DBY	EM		Con	25,909	43.8%	8,613	78.5%	25,909	17,296	15,959								59,164
South Down	NIR	NIR	UUP	UUP	20,693	40.3%	548	77.7%					20,693	3,743	20,145		4,074	2,674	51,329
South East Cambridgeshire	CAM	E		Con	28,555	57.6%	13,764	74.2%	28,555	6,261	14,791								49,607
South East Cornwall	CUL	SW		Con	28,326	55.3%	8,354	78.6%	28,326	2,507	19,972							431	51,236
South Hams	DEV	SW		Con	31,855	57.2%	12,401	74.9%	31,855	3,824	19,454							518	55,133
South Ribble	LAN	NW	Con	Con	27,625	48.8%	12,659	78.0%	27,625	14,966	13,960								56,551
South Shields	TWR	NE	Lab	Lab	19,055	46.5%	6,402	66.2%	12,653	19,055	9,288								40,996
South Staffordshire	STS	WM		Con	32,764	59.2%	19,760	75.8%	32,764	9,568	13,004								55,336
South Suffolk	SFK	E	Con	Con	29,469	50.6%	11,269	76.3%	29,469	10,516	18,200							551	58,185
South Thanet	KEN	SE		Con	24,512	56.5%	14,051	70.0%	24,512	8,429	10,461								43,402
South West Bedfordshire	BDF	E		Con	31,767	55.0%	15,731	75.6%	31,767	9,899	16,036								57,702
South West Cambridgeshire	CAM	E		Con	32,521	56.2%	13,867	75.9%	32,521	6,703	18,654								57,878
South West Hertfordshire	HRT	E	Con	Con	30,217	53.6%	12,194	75.8%	30,217	7,818	18,023							307	56,365
South West Norfolk	NFK	E	Con	Con	28,632	55.7%	14,910	73.1%	28,632	9,072	13,722								51,426
South West Surrey	SRY	SE		Con	31,067	59.7%	14,351	74.5%	31,067	4,239	16,716								52,022
South Worcestershire	HWR	WM	Con	Con	30,095	55.8%	11,389	73.6%	30,095	4,183	18,706							979	53,963
Southampton Itchen	HAM	SE	Lab	Con	21,937	41.5%	5,290	73.3%	21,937	14,324	16,647								52,908
Southampton Test	HAM	SE	Con	Con	24,657	45.2%	9,346	73.1%	24,657	15,311	14,592								54,560
Southend East	ESS	E	Con	Con	21,743	55.8%	10,691	67.6%	21,743	6,188	11,052								38,983
Southend West	ESS	E	Con	Con	26,360	54.5%	8,033	71.7%	26,360	3,675	18,327								48,362
Southport	MSY	NW	Con	Con	25,612	50.4%	5,039	72.5%	25,612	4,233	20,573							374	50,792
Southwark and Bermondsey	LND	LND		Lib	17,185	49.9%	5,164	61.7%	4,481	12,021	17,185							782	34,469
Spelthorne	SRY	SE	Con	Con	26,863	52.4%	13,506	71.0%	26,863	7,926	13,357							3,141	51,287
St Albans	HRT	E	Con	Con	29,676	52.1%	8,561	78.3%	29,676	6,213	21,115								57,004
St Helens North	MSY	NW	Lab	Lab	25,334	47.9%	9,259	74.5%	16,075	25,334	11,525								52,934
St Helens South	MSY	NW	Lab	Lab	22,906	46.9%	9,622	70.6%	13,244	22,906	10,939							1,780	48,869
St Ives	CUL	SW	Con	Con	24,297	51.4%	7,859	73.9%	24,297	5,310	16,438							1,227	47,272
Stafford	STS	WM		Con	27,639	51.2%	14,277	76.5%	27,639	12,789	13,362							212	54,002
Staffordshire Moorlands	STS	WM		Con	30,079	53.8%	16,566	77.2%	30,079	13,513	12,370								55,962
Staffordshire South East	STS	WM		Con	24,556	50.7%	10,898	76.5%	24,556	13,658	10,220								48,434
Stalybridge and Hyde	GTM	NW	Lab	Lab	21,798	45.5%	4,362	70.5%	17,436	21,798	8,339							294	44,867
Stamford and Spalding	LIN	EM		Con	27,728	56.5%	11,756	74.4%	27,728	5,354	15,972								49,054
Stevenage	HRT	E		Con	20,787	39.4%	1,755	77.9%	20,787	12,673	19,032							236	52,728
Stirling	SCT	SCT		Con	17,039	40.0%	5,133	75.7%	17,039	11,906	10,174	3,488							42,607
Stockport	GTM	NW		Con	18,517	42.1%	5,786	74.6%	18,517	12,731	12,129							563	43,940
Stockton North	CLV	NE		Lab	18,339	37.1%	1,870	70.3%	16,469	18,339	14,630								49,438
Stockton South	CLV	NE		SDP	19,550	36.8%	102	72.1%	19,448	13,998	19,550							205	53,201
Stoke-on-Trent Central	STS	WM	Lab	Lab	21,194	48.1%	8,250	65.9%	12,944	21,194	9,458								44,102
Stoke-on-Trent North	STS	WM	Lab	Lab	24,721	46.3%	8,203	71.0%	16,518	24,721	12,186								53,425
Stoke-on-Trent South	STS	WM	Lab	Lab	23,611	48.0%	7,105	69.6%	16,506	23,611	9,050								49,167
Strangford	NIR	NIR		UUP	19,086	48.8%	7,370	64.9%					19,086	11,716	1,713			2,143	39,116
Stratford-on-Avon	WAR	WM	Con	Con	34,041	60.9%	17,917	72.9%	34,041	5,731	16,124								55,896
Strathkelvin and Bearsden	SCT	SCT		Con	17,501	36.5%	3,700	79.4%	17,501	12,308	13,801	4,408							48,018
Streatham	LND	LND	Con	Con	18,264	46.5%	5,902	65.4%	18,264	8,321	12,362							321	39,268
Stretford	GTM	NW	Con	Lab	18,028	44.8%	4,342	70.0%	13,686	18,028	8,141							336	40,191
Stroud	GLS	SW	Con	Con	30,896	51.3%	11,714	77.7%	30,896	10,141	19,182								60,219
Suffolk Central	SFK	E		Con	30,096	53.5%	14,731	74.4%	30,096	10,828	15,365								56,289
Suffolk Coastal	SFK	E		Con	31,240	58.2%	15,622	75.0%	31,240	6,780	15,618								53,638
Sunderland North	TWR	NE	Lab	Lab	24,179	46.3%	7,196	66.5%	16,983	24,179	11,090								52,292
Sunderland South	TWR	NE	Lab	Lab	22,869	45.7%	5,548	66.6%	17,321	22,869	9,865								50,055
Surbiton	LND	LND	Con	Con	18,245	54.5%	8,749	71.3%	18,245	5,173	9,496							551	33,465
Sutton and Cheam	LND	LND	Con	Con	26,782	57.1%	10,264	74.3%	26,782	3,568	16,518								46,868
Sutton Coldfield	WMD	WM	Con	Con	31,753	65.4%	18,984	71.8%	31,753	4,066	12,769								48,588
Swansea East	WGM	WLS	Lab	Lab	22,297	54.4%	13,535	71.5%	8,080	22,297	8,762					1,531		294	40,964
Swansea West	WGM	WLS	Lab	Lab	18,042	42.1%	2,350	73.5%	15,692	18,042	8,036					795		265	42,830
Swindon	WIL	SW	Lab	Con	22,310	39.2%	1,395	74.2%	22,310	20,915	13,743								56,968
Tatton	CHS	NW		Con	27,877	54.6%	13,960	74.3%	27,877	9,295	13,917								51,089
Taunton	SOM	SW	Con	Con	28,112	52.9%	12,567	75.6%	28,112	9,498	15,545								53,155
Teignbridge	DEV	SW		Con	28,265	54.0%	8,218	77.5%	28,265	3,749	20,047							241	52,305
The Wrekin	SAL	WM	Con	Con	22,710	39.0%	1,331	75.5%	22,710	21,379	14,208								58,297
Thurrock	ESS	E	Lab	Lab	17,600	39.2%	1,722	67.7%	15,878	17,600	9,761							1,651	44,891
Tiverton	DEV	SW	Con	Con	27,101	54.8%	7,886	77.5%	27,101	3,154	19,215								49,470
Tonbridge and Malling	KEN	SE	Con	Con	30,417	56.1%	13,520	74.7%	30,417	6,896	16,897								54,210
Tooting	LND	LND	Lab	Lab	19,640	42.7%	2,659	67.5%	16,981	19,640	8,317							1,009	45,947
Torbay	DEV	SW	Con	Con	25,721	52.6%	6,555	72.6%	25,721	3,521	19,166							500	48,908
Torfaen	GNT	WLS		Lab	20,678	47.3%	8,285	74.4%	9,751	20,678	12,393					896			43,718
Torridge and West Devon	DEV	SW		Con	31,156	58.0%	12,351	76.0%	31,156	3,531	18,805							229	53,721
Tottenham	LND	LND	Lab	Lab	22,423	52.0%	9,396	63.4%	13,027	22,423	6,990							652	43,092
Truro	CUL	SW	Lib	Lib	31,279	57.3%	10,480	79.6%	20,799	2,479	31,279								54,447
Tunbridge Wells	KEN	SE	Con	Con	31,199	58.3%	15,126	72.7%	31,199	6,042	16,073							236	53,550
Tweeddale, Ettrick and Lauderdale	SCT	SCT	Lib	Lib	16,868	58.5%	8,539	77.8%	8,329	2,200	16,868	1,455							28,852
Twickenham	LND	LND	Con	Con	25,110	50.4%	4,792	77.8%	25,110	3,732	20,318							698	49,858
Tyne Bridge	NBL	NE		Lab	21,127	56.5%	11,693	61.5%	9,434	21,127	6,852								37,413
Tynemouth	TWR	NE	Con	Con	27,029	48.1%	9,609	74.6%	27,029	17,420	11,153								55,602
Upminster	LND	LND	Con	Con	25,153	52.5%	12,814	72.1%	25,153	9,829	12,339							566	47,887
Upper Bann	NIR	NIR		UUP	24,888	56.9%	17,081	72.0%					24,888	4,547	7,807		4,110	2,392	41,644
Uxbridge	LND	LND	Con	Con	23,875	53.6%	12,837	72.3%	23,875	9,611	11,038								44,524
Vale of Glamorgan	SGM	WLS		Con	22,241	48.0%	10,393	74.2%	22,241	12,028	11,154					1,068			46,671
Vauxhall	LND	LND	Lab	Lab	18,234	46.5%	7,780	64.5%	10,454	18,234	9,515							1,011	39,214
Wakefield	WYK	YTH	Lab	Lab	19,166	40.4%	360	69.3%	18,806	19,166	9,166							295	47,433
Wallasey	MSY	NW	Con	Con	22,854	46.0%	6,708	72.6%	22,854	16,146	10,717								49,717
Wallsend	TWR	NE	Lab	Lab	26,615	50.1%	12,514	71.1%	14,101	26,615	13,522								54,238
Walsall North	WMD	WM	Lab	Lab	20,782	42.5%	2,824	71.0%	17,958	20,782	10,141								48,881
Walsall South	WMD	WM	Lab	Lab	21,735	43.5%	702	74.3%	21,033	21,735	6,586							632	49,986
Walthamstow	LND	LND	Lab	Lab	13,241	39.8%	1,305	68.8%	11,936	13,241	7,192							868	33,237
Wansbeck	NBL	NE		Lab	21,732	47.0%	7,831	72.8%	10,563	21,732	13,901								46,196
Wansdyke	SOM	SW		Con	28,434	50.6%	13,066	79.0%	28,434	12,168	15,368							213	56,183
Wanstead and Woodford	LND	LND	Con	Con	23,765	60.3%	14,354	68.4%	23,765	5,334	9,411							932	39,442
Wantage	OXF	SE		Con	25,992	52.9%	10,125	76.9%	25,992	7,115	15,867							183	49,157
Warley East	WMD	WM	Lab	Lab	18,036	45.6%	3,391	68.9%	14,645	18,036	6,697							217	39,595
Warley West	WMD	WM	Lab	Lab	18,272	47.1%	5,268	67.8%	13,004	18,272	7,485								38,761
Warrington North	CHS	NW		Lab	20,873	41.2%	5,277	72.6%	15,596	20,873	13,951							267	50,687
Warrington South	CHS	NW		Con	22,740	41.9%	6,465	74.5%	22,740	16,275	14,827							403	54,245
Warwick and Leamington	WAR	WM	Con	Con	26,512	50.9%	13,032	73.6%	26,512	11,463	13,480							685	52,140
Watford	HRT	E	Con	Con	26,273	48.0%	12,006	76.1%	26,273	14,247	14,267								54,787
Waveney	SFK	E		Con	30,371	51.8%	14,298	75.3%	30,371	16,073	12,234							403	58,678
Wellingborough	NTH	EM	Con	Con	25,715	48.9%	12,056	77.8%	25,715	13,659	12,994							228	52,596
Wells	SOM	SW	Con	Con	25,385	52.6%	6,575	77.6%	25,385	3,747	18,810							273	48,215
Welwyn Hatfield	HRT	E	Con	Con	27,498	47.7%	12,246	79.4%	27,498	14,898	15,252								57,648
Wentworth	SYK	YTH		Lab	27,498	59.1%	15,935	69.7%	9,603	27,498	8,082								45,183
West Bromwich East	WMD	WM	Lab	Lab	15,894	38.1%	298	70.2%	15,596	15,894	10,200								41,690
West Bromwich West	WMD	WM	Lab	Lab	18,896	50.7%	6,639	63.8%	12,257	18,896	6,094								37,247
West Derbyshire	DBY	EM	Con	Con	29,695	55.9%	15,325	77.4%	29,695	9,060	14,370								53,125
West Gloucestershire	GLS	SW	Con	Con	27,092	45.8%	9,652	79.6%	27,092	14,572	17,440								59,104
West Hertfordshire	HRT	E	Con	Con	28,436	46.7%	9,486	79.4%	28,436	13,583	18,860								60,879
West Lancashire	LAN	NW		Con	25,458	46.3%	6,858	74.4%	25,458	18,600	10,983							1,220	55,041
Westbury	WIL	SW	Con	Con	31,133	51.4%	8,506	75.5%	31,133	6,058	22,627							740	60,558
Western Isles	SCT	SCT	SNP	SNP	8,272	54.5%	3,712	66.5%	8,272	4,560	876	8,272							15,168
Westminster North	LND	LND		Con	19,134	43.2%	1,710	64.2%	19,134	17,424	6,956							748	44,262
Westmorland and Lonsdale	CMA	NW		Con	29,775	61.3%	16,587	72.3%	29,775	4,798	13,188							805	48,566
Weston-super-Mare	AVN	SW	Con	Con	27,948	53.6%	9,491	73.1%	27,948	5,781	18,457								52,186
Wigan	GTM	NW	Lab	Lab	29,859	54.6%	17,305	75.6%	12,320	29,859	12,554								54,734
Wimbledon	LND	LND	Con	Con	24,169	52.1%	11,546	72.4%	24,169	8,806	12,623							831	46,429
Winchester	HAM	SE	Con	Con	31,908	57.6%	13,047	76.2%	31,908	4,512	18,861							155	55,436
Windsor and Maidenhead	BRK	SE	Con	Con	32,191	58.2%	18,203	70.3%	32,191	6,383	13,988							2,721	55,283
Wirral South	MSY	NW		Con	24,766	53.7%	13,838	75.8%	24,766	10,411	10,928								46,105
Wirral West	MSY	NW		Con	25,276	55.9%	15,151	73.4%	25,276	9,855	10,125								45,256
Witney	OXF	SE		Con	28,695	55.4%	12,712	74.7%	28,695	7,145	15,983								51,823
Woking	SRY	SE	Con	Con	32,748	58.3%	16,237	71.7%	32,748	6,566	16,511							368	56,193
Wokingham	BRK	SE	Con	Con	32,925	60.4%	15,698	76.0%	32,925	4,362	17,227								54,514
Wolverhampton North East	WMD	WM	Lab	Lab	17,941	40.1%	214	70.3%	17,727	17,941	8,524							585	44,777
Wolverhampton South East	WMD	WM	Lab	Lab	17,440	44.7%	5,012	69.1%	12,428	17,440	9,112								38,980
Wolverhampton South East	WMD	WM	Con	Con	25,214	50.6%	11,520	72.4%	25,214	13,694	10,724							201	49,833
Woodspring	SOM	SW		Con	31,932	57.6%	15,132	77.8%	31,932	6,536	16,800							177	55,445
Woolwich	LND	LND		SDP	15,492	40.5%	2,725	68.0%	9,616	12,767	15,492							384	38,259
Worcester	HWR	WM	Con	Con	24,381	49.5%	10,871	74.1%	24,381	11,208	13,510								49,307
Workington	CMA	NW	Lab	Lab	23,239	52.0%	7,128	79.6%	16,111	23,239	5,311								44,661
Worsley	GTM	NW		Lab	21,675	40.3%	4,139	74.7%	17,536	21,675	14,545								53,756
Worthing	WSX	SE	Con	Con	32,807	60.9%	15,253	71.2%	32,807	3,158	17,554							395	53,914
Wrexham	CON	WLS	Lab	Lab	16,120	34.3%	424	77.5%	15,696	16,120	13,974					1,239			47,029
Wycombe	BKM	SE	Con	Con	27,221	54.2%	13,197	71.7%	27,221	8,636	14,024							327	50,208
Wyre	LAN	NW		Con	26,559	56.4%	14,811	71.4%	26,559	8,743	11,748								47,050
Wyre Forest	HWR	WM		Con	24,809	48.4%	8,177	75.1%	24,809	9,850	16,632								51,291
Yeovil	SOM	SW	Con	Lib	26,608	50.5%	3,406	79.8%	23,202	2,928	26,608								52,738
Ynys Môn	GWN	WLS	Con	Con	15,017	37.5%	1,684	79.6%	15,017	6,791	4,947					13,333			40,088
York	NYK	YTH	Lab	Con	24,309	41.3%	3,647	75.1%	24,309	20,662	13,523							352	58,846
Total for all constituencies								72.7%	13,012,316	8,456,934	7,794,770	331,975	259,952	152,749	137,012	125,309	102,701	297,419	30,671,137
Total for all constituencies								72.7%	42.4%	27.6%	25.4%	1.1%	0.8%	0.5%	0.4%	0.4%	0.3%	1.1%	100.0%
Total for all constituencies								72.7%	Seats										
Total for all constituencies								72.7%	397	208	23	2	11	3	1	2	1	2	650
Total for all constituencies								72.7%	61.1%	32.0%	3.5%	0.3%	1.7%	0.5%	0.2%	0.3%	0.2%	0.3%	100.0%

== See also ==
- 1983 United Kingdom general election
- List of MPs elected in the 1983 United Kingdom general election
