= David Thomas (MEP) =

British politician (born 1955)

David Thomas MEP
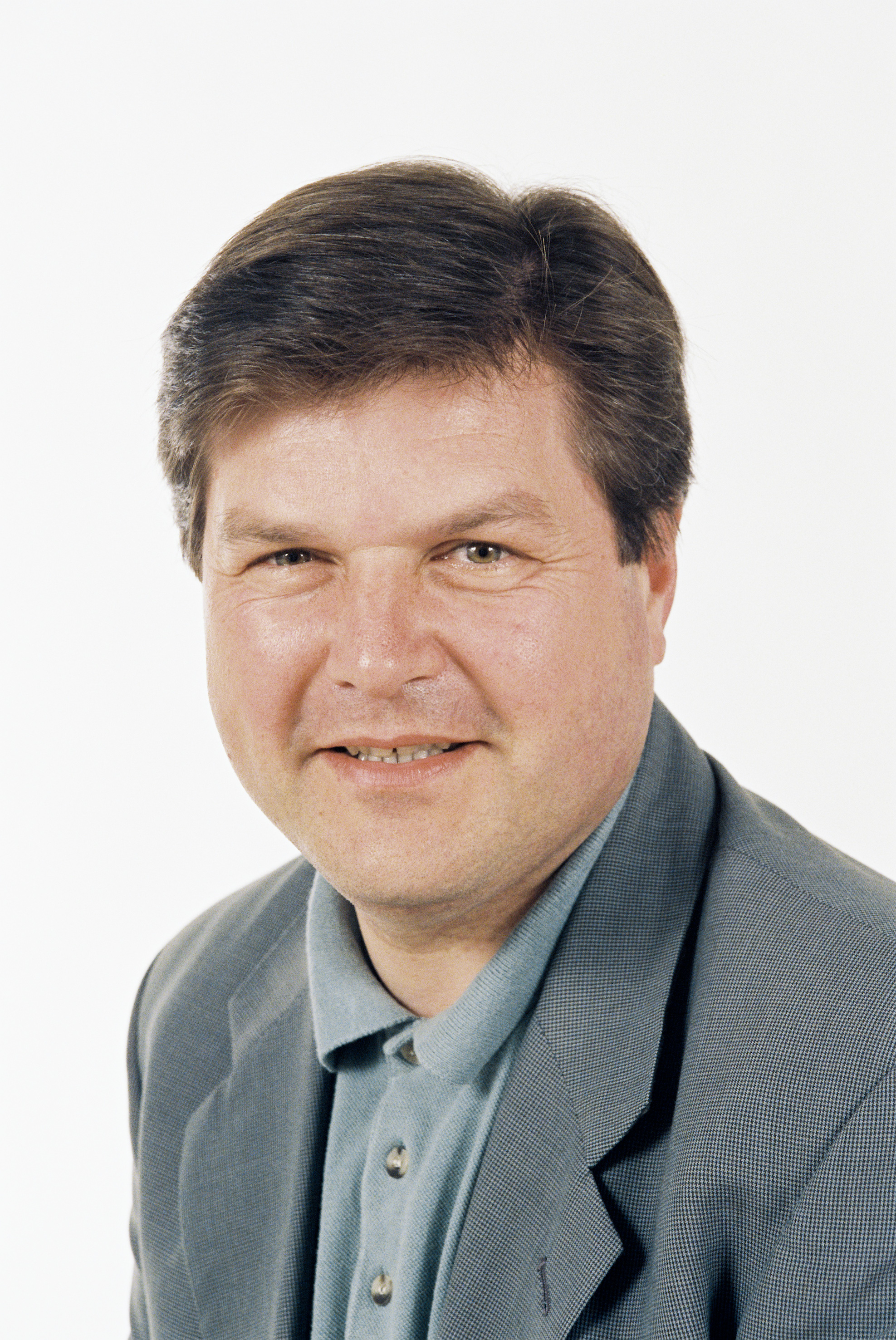
- Official MEP portrait

Member of the European Parliament for Suffolk and South West Norfolk
- In office 1994–1999

Personal details
- Born: 12 January 1955 (age 71)
- Party: Labour
- Education: University of East Anglia (BA)

David Edward Thomas (born 12 January 1955) is a British Labour Party politician and former Member of the European Parliament (MEP).

He was educated at Cefn Hengoed Comprehensive School, Swansea, and at the University of East Anglia where he took a BA in English. In 2010 he went back to the University of East Anglia to take a Graduate Diploma in Law. He served as the MEP for Suffolk and South West Norfolk from 1994 to 1999.
