= Paul Howell (MEP) =

British politician

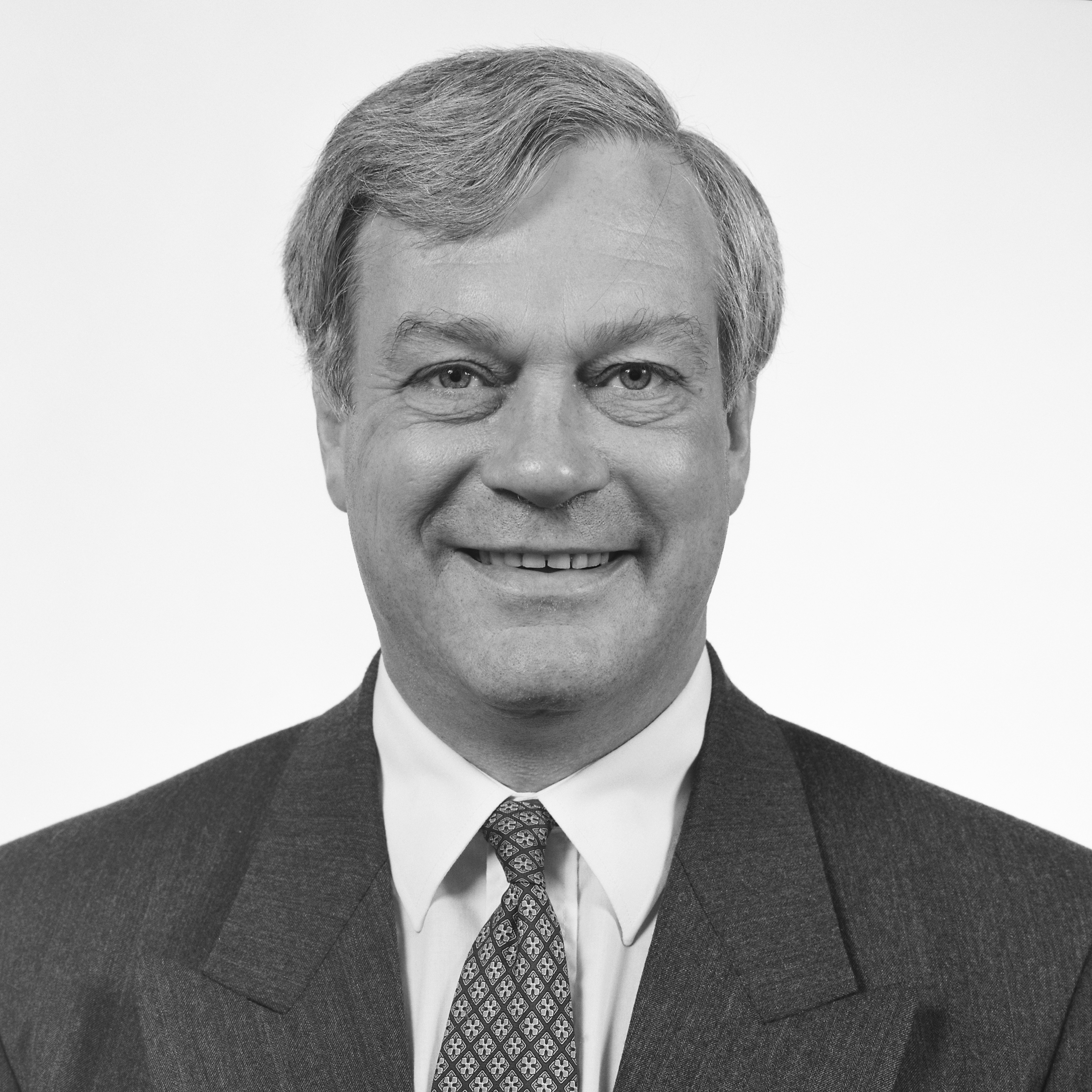
European Parliament portrait

Paul Frederick Howell (17 January 1951 – 20 September 2008) was a British politician who served as a Conservative Party Member of the European Parliament (MEP) for Norfolk from 1979 to 1994.

== Biography ==
Born in King's Lynn, the son of Sir Ralph Howell MP, he was educated at Gresham's School, Holt and St Edmund Hall, Oxford.

After Oxford, Howell devoted much of his early career to the Conservative Party, first in its Research Department (1973–1975), and later as an MEP. Generally on the liberal wing of the Party, he was a member of the Tory Reform Group. After losing his Norfolk constituency in the 1994 European election, he went into business as chairman of Riceman Insurance Investments plc. Always a pro-European, the rise of the Euro-sceptics in the Conservative Party led him to join first the Pro-Euro Conservative Party, standing for them in the East of England region at the 1999 EU Parliament elections, and then the Liberal Democrats.

Howell died with at least five other people when a Piper Seneca aircraft he was in crashed on a beach just short of Beira, the second largest city in Mozambique. He had been looking at agricultural business interests in South Africa and Mozambique.

== Career summary ==
- Conservative Research Department, 1973–75
- MEP (Conservative) for Norfolk, 1979–94
- Member of Agricultural, Foreign Affairs and Fisheries Committees of the European Parliament, 1979–1994
- Spokesman for the European Democrat Group on youth culture, education, information and sport, 1984–86; on agriculture, 1989–92; on fisheries, 1989–94
- Member and EDG spokesman, Regl Committee, 1992–94
- Member of European Parliamentary delegations: to Central America, 1987–94; to Soviet Union, 1989–91; to Commonwealth of Independent States, 1991–94; to Russia, Ukraine, Georgia, Armenia and Azerbaijan, 1993–94
- Vice-chairman, European Parliament-Comecon Delegation, 1984
- Chairman, Riceman Insurance Investments plc, 1995–99
- Member of Council and Trustee of the RSPB, 1992–95
- Trustee, Nuffield Russia Trust, since 1991
