= Ralph Howell =

British politician (1923–2008)

Sir Ralph Frederic Howell (25 May 1923 – 14 February 2008) was a British farmer and Conservative Party politician. He served as Member of Parliament (MP) for North Norfolk for 27 years.

== Early life ==
Howell was born in Great Moulton in Norfolk, the son of a farmer. He was educated at Diss Grammar School, Norfolk. He joined the RAF in 1941, becoming a navigator and bomb aimer. He was demobilised as a flight lieutenant in 1946, and became an arable farmer, later chairing the local branch of the National Farmers Union.

He married Margaret Bone in 1950. His wife died in 2005. He was survived by their daughter and two sons.

== Political career ==
He joined the Conservative Party, and was councillor for Mitford and Launditch Rural District Council from 1961. He stood for Parliament in North Norfolk at the 1966 general election, but could not displace the incumbent Labour MP, Bert Hazell. He won the seat at the 1970 general election, and his assiduous constituency work enabled him to retain the seat for the next 27 years with increasing majorities.

His politics were considered to fall on the right wing of his party, supporting compulsory National Service, reintroduction of the death penalty, tax cuts, reduction of the public sector, stronger controls on immigration rules, and the introduction of identity cards. He was a proponent of the adoption of a "workfare" system of unemployment benefits, to encourage unemployed people to find jobs. His book, Why Work?, was published in 1976, followed by Why Not Work? (1991) and Putting Britain Back to Work (1995). He served on several backbench committees, and on the executive of the 1922 Committee from 1984 to 1990. In 1996, he introduced the Right to Work Bill, which proposed the state as the employer of last resort for the unemployed.

Howell was a nominated member of the European Parliament from 1974 to 1979, and a delegate to the Council of Europe and the Western European Union from 1987 to 1997. He was knighted in 1993. His elder son, Paul Howell, was elected as an MEP for Norfolk from 1979 to 1994.

He retired from the House of Commons at the 1997 general election. His seat was retained by the Conservative David Prior, the son of one of Howell's internal political opponents, "wet" former Conservative cabinet minister Jim Prior.

Parliament of the United Kingdom
Preceded by Bert Hazell	Member of Parliament for North Norfolk; 1970–1997	Succeeded by David Prior
