= List of elections in 1987 =

The following elections occurred in the year 1987.

== Africa ==
- 1987 Algerian parliamentary election
- 1987 Central African Republic parliamentary election
- 1987 Comorian legislative election
- 1987 Djiboutian general election
- 1987 Egyptian parliamentary election
- 1987 Ethiopian general election
- 1987 Gambian general election
- 1987 Malawian general election
- 1987 Mauritian general election
- 1987 Seychellois parliamentary election
- 1987 South African general election
- 1987 Swazi general election
- 1987 Zairean parliamentary election

== Asia ==
- 1987 Egyptian parliamentary election
- 1987 Indonesian legislative election
- 1987 Philippine House of Representatives elections
- 1987 Philippine Senate election
- 1987 Philippine legislative election
- 1987 South Korean presidential election
- 1987 Indian presidential election
- 1987 Indian vice presidential election
- 1987 North Korean local elections
- 1987 Turkish general election
- 1987 Vietnamese legislative election

== Europe ==
- 1987 Åland legislative election
- 1987 Albanian parliamentary election
- 1987 Andorran local elections
- 1987 Belgian general election
- 1987 Danish parliamentary election
- 1987 Finnish parliamentary election
- 1987 Icelandic parliamentary election
- 1987 Irish general election
- 1987 Italian general election
- 1987 Italian nuclear power referendum
- 1987 Liechtenstein local elections
- 1987 Maltese general election
- 1987 Norwegian local elections
- 1987 Portuguese legislative election
- 1987 Romanian local elections
- 1987 Swiss federal election
- 1987 Turkish general election

=== European Parliament ===
- European Parliament election, 1987 (Portugal)
- European Parliament election, 1987 (Spain)

=== Germany ===
- 1987 Rhineland-Palatinate state election
- 1987 West German federal election

=== Spain ===
- Elections to the Aragonese Corts, 1987
- Elections to the Corts Valencianes, 1987
- European Parliament election, 1987 (Spain)
- 1987 Spanish local elections

=== United Kingdom ===
- 1987 United Kingdom general election
  - England: 1987 United Kingdom general election in England
  - Scotland: 1987 United Kingdom general election in Scotland
  - Wales: 1987 United Kingdom general election in Wales
  - Northern Ireland: 1987 United Kingdom general election in Northern Ireland
  - List of MPs elected in the 1987 United Kingdom general election
- 1987 Greenwich by-election
- 1987 Truro by-election
- 1987 University of Oxford Chancellor election

==== United Kingdom local ====
- 1987 United Kingdom local elections

===== English local =====
- 1987 Bristol City Council election
- 1987 Manchester Council election
- 1987 Trafford Council election
- 1987 Wolverhampton Council election

== North America ==
=== Canada ===
- 1987 New Brunswick general election
- 1987 Northwest Territories general election
- 1987 Ontario general election
- 1987 Quebec municipal elections

=== Caribbean ===
- 1987 Bahamian general election
- 1987 Haitian presidential election
- 1987 Montserratian general election
- 6 April 1987 Saint Lucian general election
- 30 April 1987 Saint Lucian general election

=== United States ===
==== United States lieutenant gubernatorial ====
- 1987 Kentucky lieutenant gubernatorial election
- 1987 Louisiana lieutenant gubernatorial election

==== United States gubernatorial ====
- 1987 Kentucky gubernatorial election
- 1987 Louisiana gubernatorial election
- 1987 Mississippi gubernatorial election
- 1987 United States gubernatorial elections

==== United States House of Representatives ====
- 1987 United States House of Representatives elections
- 1987 California's 5th congressional district special election
- 1987 Connecticut's 4th congressional district special election

==== United States mayoral elections ====
- 1987 Baltimore mayoral election
- 1987 Boston mayoral election
- 1987 Burlington mayoral election
- 1987 Chicago mayoral election
- 1987 Evansville mayoral election
- 1987 Fort Wayne mayoral election
- 1987 Houston mayoral election
- 1987 Indianapolis mayoral election
- 1987 Jacksonville mayoral election
- 1987 Madison mayoral election
- 1987 Manchester, New Hampshire, mayoral election
- 1987 Philadelphia mayoral election
- 1987 San Francisco mayoral election
- 1987 South Bend mayoral election
- 1987 Springfield, Massachusetts, mayoral election
- 1987 Tampa mayoral election
- 1987 Toledo, Ohio mayoral election
- 1987 Worcester mayoral election

== Oceania ==
- 1987 Fijian general election
- 1987 Kiribati parliamentary election
- 1987 Kiribati presidential election
- 1987 Micronesian general election
- 1987 Nauruan parliamentary election
- 1987 New Zealand general election
- 1987 Papua New Guinean general election
- 1987 Tongan general election
- 1987 Vanuatuan general election

=== Australia ===
- 1987 Australian federal election
- 1987 Barkly by-election
- 1987 Morley-Swan state by-election
- 1987 Bankstown state by-election
- 1987 Heathcote state by-election
- 1987 Morley-Swan state by-election
- 1987 Northern Tablelands state by-election
- 1987 Northern Territory general election
- 1987 Southport state by-election

== South America ==
- 1987 Argentine legislative election
- 1987 Surinamese general election
