= 1987 United Kingdom general election in England =

- 11 June 1987

All 523 English seats in the House of Commons
- Turnout: 75.4% (▲2.9 pp)
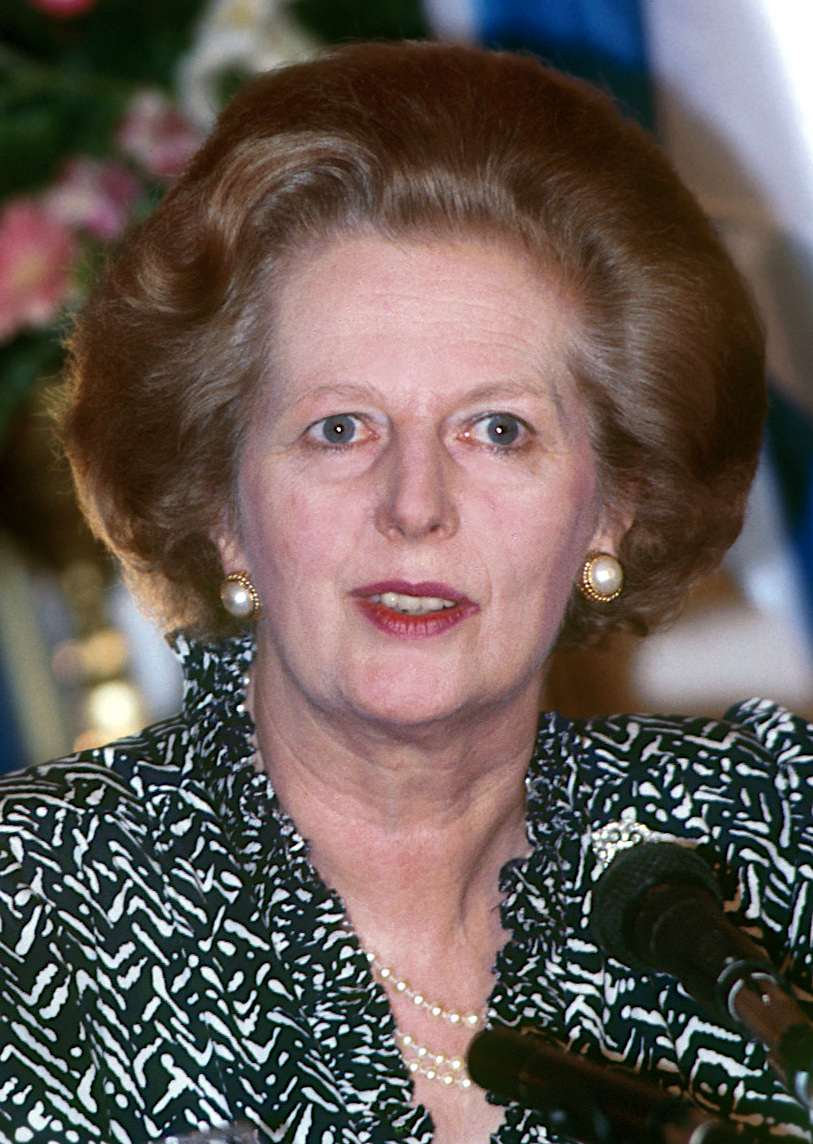

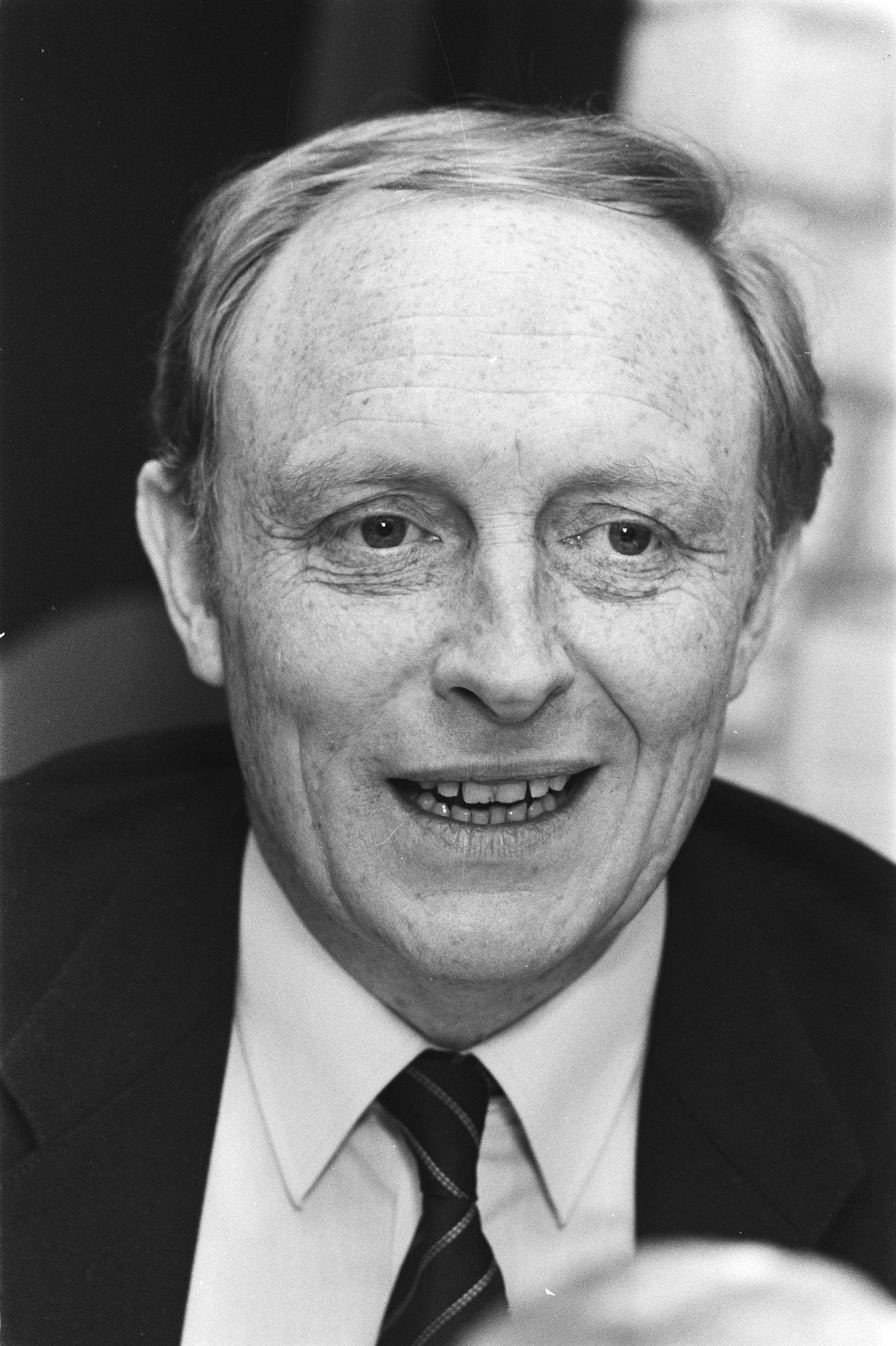

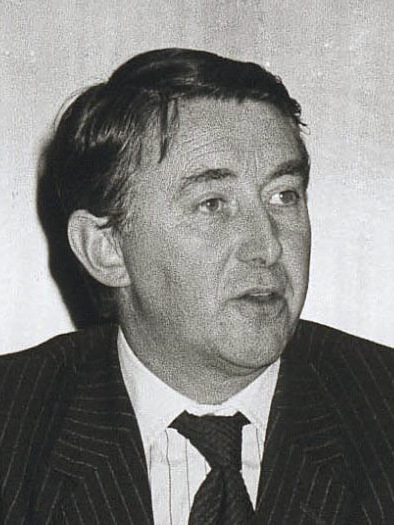

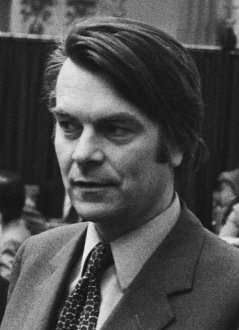
	First party	Second party
Leader	Margaret Thatcher	Neil Kinnock
Party	Conservative	Labour
Leader since	11 February 1975	2 October 1983
Leader's seat	Finchley	Islwyn
Last election	362 seats, 46.0%	148 seats, 26.8%
Seats won	358 (Note: Figure includes Speaker of the House of Commons Bernard Weatherill in Croydon North East.)	155
Seat change	▼4	▲7
Popular vote	12,546,186	8,006,466
Percentage	46.2%	29.5%
Swing	▲0.2 pp	▲2.5 pp
	Third party	Fourth party
Leader	David Steel	David Owen
Party	Liberal	SDP
Alliance	SDP–Liberal Alliance	SDP–Liberal Alliance
Leader since	7 July 1976	21 June 1983
Leader's seat	Tweeddale, Ettrick and Lauderdale	Plymouth Devonport
Last election	10 seats, 14.4%	3 seats, 12.0%
Seats won	7	3
Seat change	▼3	Steady
Popular vote	3,684,813	2,782,537
Percentage	13.6%	10.3%
Swing	▼0.8 pp	▼1.7 pp

On Thursday 11 June 1987, the 1987 United Kingdom general election was held in England, to elect all 650 members of the House of Commons, with 523 constituencies being in England.

== Candidates ==
Below is a table summarising the candidates of the 1987 general election in England, showing parties that stood 10 or more candidates each.

Affiliation	Candidates
Conservative and Unionist Party	523
Labour Party	523
Liberal Party	271
Social Democratic Party	252
Green Party	117
Communist Party of Great Britain	13
Red Front	13
Independent	11
Workers Revolutionary Party	10
Other	49
Total	1,782

== Analysis ==
The Conservative Party won an overall majority of English seats for the third successive election and enough seats to seal a UK-wide majority already within England's borders. 326 was the UK-wide threshold and the Conservatives won 358 in the English constituencies.

The 1987 general election saw the election of the first Black Members of Parliament: Diane Abbott, Paul Boateng and Bernie Grant, all as representatives in Greater London for the Labour Party. Future Cabinet members David Blunkett, John Redwood and Andrew Smith and future Shadow Cabinet minister Ann Widdecombe also entered the House of Commons in English constituencies. MPs who left the House of Commons as a result of this election included Keith Joseph, Jim Prior, Ian Mikardo and Clement Freud.

== Results ==
Party	Seats					Aggregate votes		
Party	Total	Gains	Losses	Net	Of all (%)	Total	Of all (%)	Change (%)
Conservative	358	9	13	▼4	68.5	12,546,186	46.2	▲0.2
Labour	155	13	6	▲7	29.6	8,006,466	29.5	▲2.5
SDP–Liberal Alliance (Total)	10	2	5	▼3	1.9	6,467,350	23.8	▼2.6
Liberal	7	1 (Note: Ronnie Fearn in Southport.)	4	▼3	1.9	3,684,813	13.6	▼0.8
SDP	3	1 (Note: Rosie Barnes in Greenwich.)	1 (Note: Ian Wrigglesworth in Stockton South.)	Steady	0.6	2,782,537	10.3	▼1.7
Green	0	0	0	Steady	—	82,787	0.3	▲0.1
Independent	0	0	0	Steady	—	4,292	0.0	▼0.1
Communist	0	0	0	Steady	—	4,022	0.0	Steady
Ind. Conservative	0	0	0	Steady	—	3,781	0.0	▼0.1
Red Front	0	New			—	3,051	0.0	New
Moderate Labour	0	New			—	2,269	0.0	New
Monster Raving Loony	0	0	0	Steady	—	1,951	0.0	Steady
Workers Revolutionary	0	0	0	Steady	—	1,721	0.0	Steady
Independent Labour	0	0	0	Steady	—	1,227	0.0	▼0.1
Gaitskell Labour	0	New			—	638	0.0	New
BNP	0	0	0	Steady	—	553	0.0	Steady
Spare the Earth	0	0	0	Steady	—	522	0.0	Steady
Fancy Dress	0	0	0	Steady	—	491	0.0	Steady
657 Party	0	New			—	455	0.0	New
OOBPC	0	New			—	435	0.0	New
Democrat	0	New			—	408	0.0	New
Restore Capital Punishment	0	New			—	405	0.0	New
Ex-Labour Moderate	0	New			—	397	0.0	New
Creek Road Fresh Bread	0	New			—	373	0.0	New
Humanist	0	New			—	353	0.0	New
Blancmange Towers	0	New			—	328	0.0	New
Rainbow Dream Ticket	0	New			—	308	0.0	New
National Front	0	0	0	Steady	—	286	0.0	▼0.1
Male OAP	0	New			—	283	0.0	New
Feudal Party	0	New			—	263	0.0	New
RRPRC	0	New			—	232	0.0	New
ACMFT	0	New			—	217	0.0	New
LAPP	0	New			—	209	0.0	New
PRP	0	New			—	185	0.0	New
CPWSML	0	New			—	175	0.0	New
Canterbury Nationalist	0	New			—	157	0.0	New
Christian Democrat	0	New			—	151	0.0	New
Gremloids Party	0	New			—	131	0.0	New
CSOSMG	0	New			—	125	0.0	New
CPRP	0	New			—	110	0.0	New
Socialist (GB)	0	0	0	Steady	—	81	0.0	Steady
Fellowship	0	0	0	Steady	—	59	0.0	Steady
Gold Party	0	New			—	59	0.0	New
Public Independent Plaintiff	0	New			—	30	0.0	New
Blank and invalid votes						27,213	—	—
Total	523			0	100.0	27,133,522 (Note: All valid votes excluding spoiled votes.)	100.0	0.0
Registered voters, and turnout						35,987,776	75.4	▲2.9

Popular vote
Conservative	46.2%
Labour	29.5%
Alliance	23.8%
Green	0.3%
Other	0.1%

Parliament seats
Conservative	68.5%
Labour	29.6%
Alliance	1.9%

== By region ==
Note: these results are based on the previously-used standard statistical regions, not the current regions of England established in 1994.

=== North ===
This region included Northumberland, County Durham, Tyne and Wear and constituencies in the defunct county of Cleveland in the current English region of North East England, as well as Cumbria.

Party	Seats					Aggregate Votes		
Party	Total	Gains	Losses	Net	Of all (%)	Total	Of all (%)	Change (%)
Labour	27	1	0	▲1	75.0	830,785	46.4	▲6.2
Conservative	8	0	0	Steady	22.2	578,996	32.3	▼2.3
Alliance	1	0	1	▼1	2.8	376,675	21.0	▼4.0
Others	0	0	0	Steady	0.0	4,635	0.3	▲0.1
Total	36					1,791,091		

=== Yorkshire and the Humber ===
Like the current statistical region, this region included North Yorkshire, West Yorkshire, South Yorkshire and the East Riding of Yorkshire, North Lincolnshire and North East Lincolnshire constituencies in Humberside.

Party	Seats					Aggregate Votes		
Party	Total	Gains	Losses	Net	Of all (%)	Total	Of all (%)	Change (%)
Labour	33	5	0	▲5	61.1	1,128,878	40.6	▲5.3
Conservative	21	0	3	▼3	38.9	1,040,751	37.4	▼1.2
Alliance	0	0	2	▼2	0.0	602,709	21.7	▼3.9
Others	0	0	0	Steady	0.0	7,811	0.3	▼0.2
Total	54					2,780,149		

=== East Midlands ===
Like the current statistical region, this region included Derbyshire, Lincolnshire (excluding North Lincolnshire and North East Lincolnshire), Northamptonshire, Nottinghamshire, Leicestershire and Rutland.

Party	Seats					Aggregate Votes		
Party	Total	Gains	Losses	Net	Of all (%)	Total	Of all (%)	Change (%)
Conservative	31	0	3	▼3	73.8	1,127,208	48.6	▲1.4
Labour	11	3	0	▲3	26.2	696,780	30.0	▲2.1
Alliance	0	0	0	Steady	0.0	487,164	21.0	▼3.1
Others	0	0	0	Steady	0.0	9,128	0.4	▼0.4
Total	42					2,230,280		

=== East Anglia ===
This region included Cambridgeshire, Norfolk and Suffolk.

Party	Seats					Aggregate Votes		
Party	Total	Gains	Losses	Net	Of all (%)	Total	Of all (%)	Change (%)
Conservative	19	1	0	▲1	95.0	601,421	52.1	▲1.1
Labour	1	0	0	Steady	5.0	249,894	21.7	▲1.2
Alliance	0	0	1	▼1	0.0	297,041	25.7	▼2.5
Others	0	0	0	Steady	0.0	5,217	0.5	▲0.2
Total	20					1,153,573		

=== Greater London ===
This consisted of the constituencies within the county and region of Greater London.

Party	Seats					Aggregate Votes		
Party	Total	Gains	Losses	Net	Of all (%)	Total	Of all (%)	Change (%)
Conservative	58	2	0	▲2	69.0	1,680,140	46.5	▲2.6
Labour	23	0	3	▼3	27.4	1,136,903	31.5	▲1.6
Alliance	3	1	0	▲1	3.6	770,117	21.3	▼3.4
Others	0	0	0	Steady	0.0	26,681	0.7	▼0.9
Total	84					3,613,841		

Greater London

=== South East England ===
This region included Hampshire, Isle of Wight, Oxfordshire, Berkshire, Buckinghamshire, Kent, Surrey, East Sussex and West Sussex within the current South East England. It also included Bedfordshire, Hertfordshire, Essex within the current East of England region.

However, it excluded Greater London, which was otherwise part of the standard statistical region at the time.

Party	Seats					Aggregate Votes		
Party	Total	Gains	Losses	Net	Of all (%)	Total	Of all (%)	Change (%)
Conservative	107	1	0	▲1	99.1	3,382,849	55.6	▲1.1
Labour	1	2	0	Steady	0.9	1,023,521	16.8	▲0.9
Alliance	0	0	1	▼1	0.0	1,653,514	27.2	▼1.8
Others	0	0	0	Steady	0.0	27,603	1.4	▼0.2
Total	108					6,087,487		

=== South West England ===
Like the current statistical region, this region included Cornwall, Dorset, Devon, Gloucestershire, Somerset, Wiltshire, and the defunct county of Avon.

Party	Seats					Aggregate Votes		
Party	Total	Gains	Losses	Net	Of all (%)	Total	Of all (%)	Change (%)
Conservative	44	0	0	Steady	91.7	1,386,857	50.6	▼0.8
Alliance	3	0	0	Steady	6.2	906,288	15.9	▼0.1
Labour	1	0	0	Steady	2.1	436,358	33.0	▲1.2
Others	0	0	0	Steady	0.0	13,048	0.5	▼0.3
Total	48					2,742,551		

=== West Midlands ===
Like the current statistical region, this region included Shropshire, Staffordshire, Warwickshire, the county of West Midlands, Herefordshire and Worcestershire.

Party	Seats					Aggregate Votes		
Party	Total	Gains	Losses	Net	Of all (%)	Total	Of all (%)	Change (%)
Conservative	36	0	0	Steady	62.1	1,346,505	45.5	▲0.5
Labour	22	0	0	Steady	37.9	984,667	33.3	▲2.1
Alliance	0	0	0	Steady	0.0	615,699	20.8	▼2.6
Others	0	0	0	Steady	0.0	10,401	0.4	▼0.1
Total	58					2,957,272		

=== North West ===
This region included Lancashire, Greater Manchester, Merseyside and Cheshire.

Party	Seats					Aggregate Votes		
Party	Total	Gains	Losses	Net	Of all (%)	Total	Of all (%)	Change (%)
Labour	36	8	0	▲1	60.3	1,518,680	41.2	▲5.2
Conservative	34	0	2	▼2	37.0	1,401,459	38.0	▼2.0
Alliance	3	0	1	▲1	2.7	758,143	20.6	▼2.8
Others	0	0	0	Steady	0.0	8,996	0.2	▼0.4
Total	73					3,687,278		

== See also ==
- 1987 United Kingdom general election in Northern Ireland
- 1987 United Kingdom general election in Scotland
- 1987 United Kingdom general election in Wales
- List of United Kingdom Parliament constituencies (1983–1997) by region
