= 1987 United Kingdom general election in Scotland =

- 11 June 1987

All 72 Scottish seats to the House of Commons
- Turnout: 75.1% (▲2.4%)
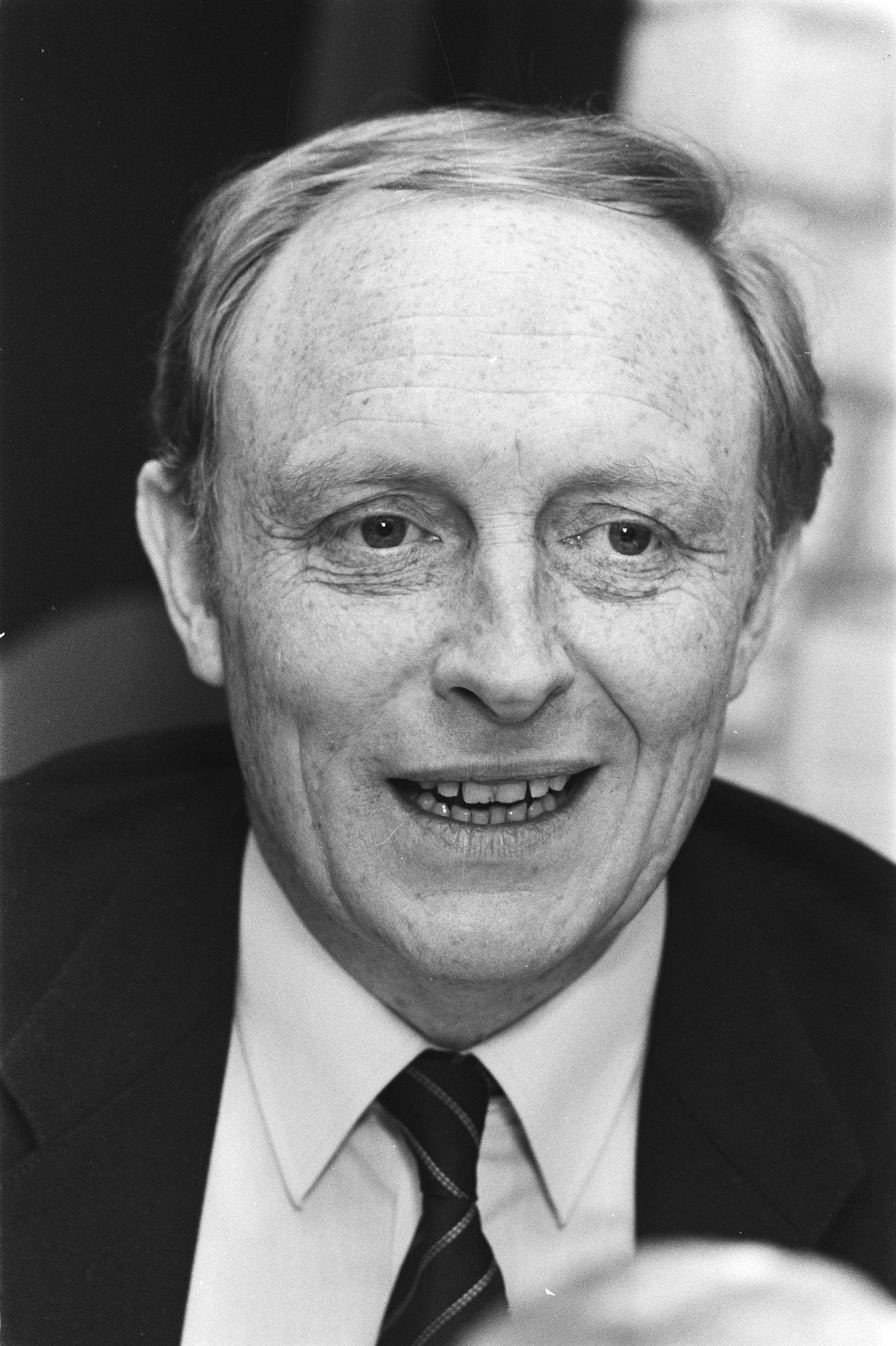

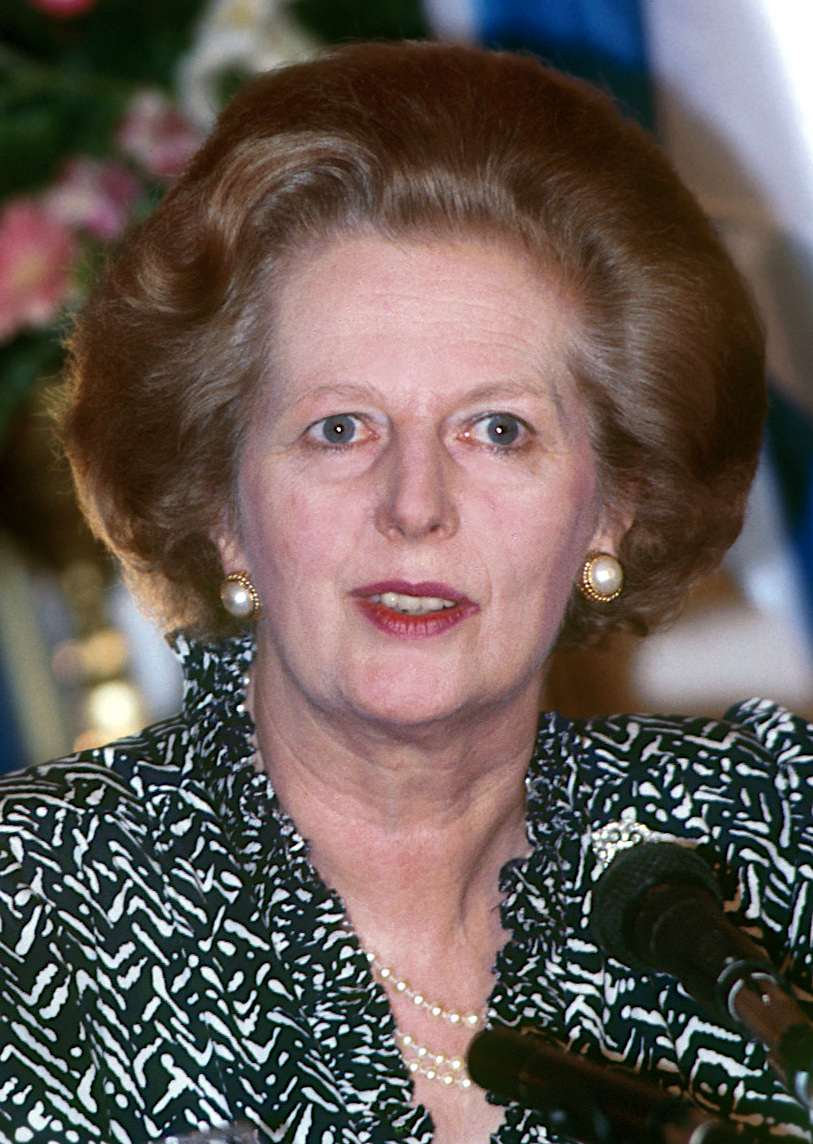

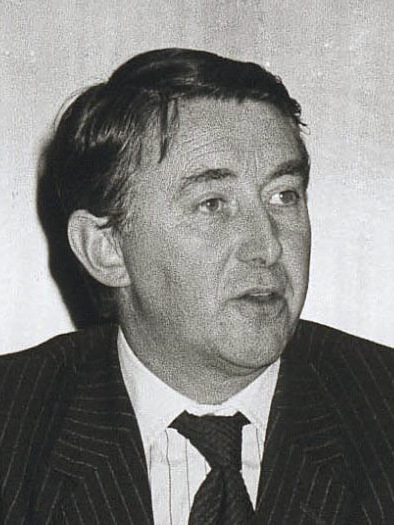

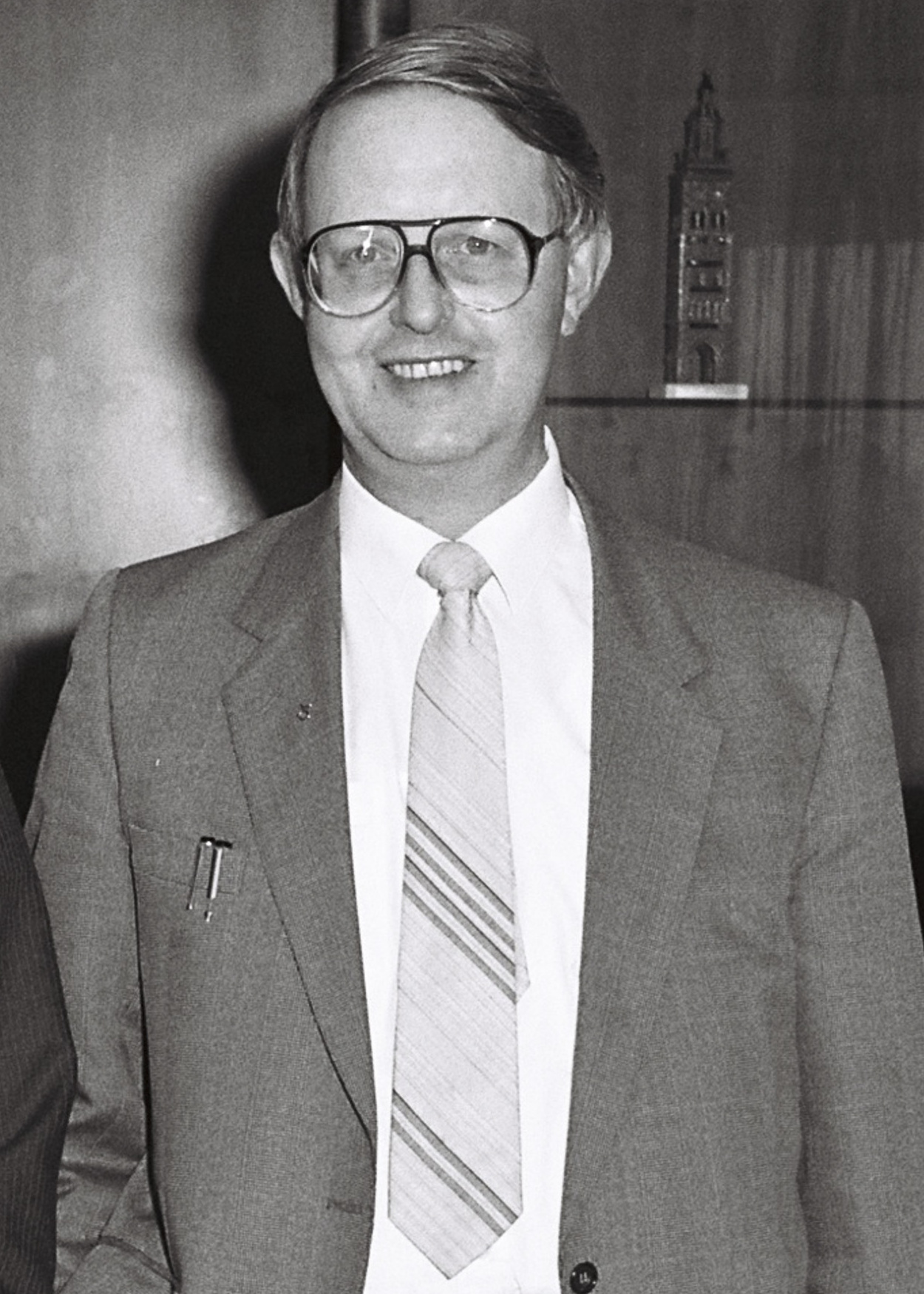

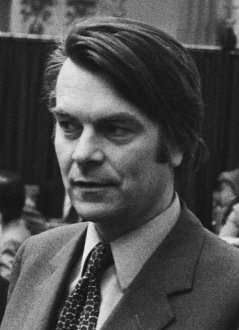
| | First party | Second party | Third party |
|---|---|---|---|
| Leader | Neil Kinnock | Margaret Thatcher | David Steel |
| Party | Labour | Conservative | Liberal |
| Alliance | | | SDP–Liberal Alliance |
| Leader since | 2 October 1983 | 11 February 1975 | 7 July 1976 |
| Leader's seat | Islwyn | Finchley | Tweeddale, Ettrick and Lauderdale |
| Last election | 41 seats, 35.1% | 21 seats, 28.4% | 5 seats, 12.6% |
| Seats won | 50 | 10 | 7 |
| Seat change | ▲9 | ▼11 | ▲2 |
| Popular vote | 1,258,132 | 713,081 | 307,210 |
| Percentage | 42.4% | 24.0% | 10.4% |
| Swing | ▲7.3 pp | ▼4.4 pp | ▼2.2 pp |
| | Fourth party | Fifth party |
| Leader | Gordon Wilson | David Owen |
| Party | SNP | SDP |
| Alliance | | SDP–Liberal Alliance |
| Leader since | 15 September 1979 | 21 June 1983 |
| Leader's seat | Dundee East (lost seat) | Plymouth Devonport |
| Last election | 2 seats, 11.8% | 3 seats, 11.9% |
| Seats won | 3 | 2 |
| Seat change | ▲1 | ▼1 |
| Popular vote | 416,473 | 262,843 |
| Percentage | 14.0% | 8.9% |
| Swing | ▲2.2 pp | ▼3.0 pp |

On Thursday 11 June 1987, the 1987 United Kingdom general election was held in Scotland, to elect all 650 members of the House of Commons, with 72 constituencies being in Scotland.

== Candidates ==
Below is a table summarising the candidates of the 1987 general election in Scotland.

| Affiliation | Candidates |
|---|---|
| Labour Party | 72 |
| Conservative and Unionist Party | 72 |
| Scottish National Party | 71 |
| Liberal Party | 36 |
| Social Democratic Party | 36 |
| Green Party | 12 |
| Communist Party of Great Britain | 5 |
| Independent | 1 (Note: Candidate Dan Kenny in Galloway and Upper Nithsdale.) |
| Independent Liberal | 1 (Note: Candidate William Mowat stood in Caithness and Sutherland.) |
| Orkney and Shetland Movement | 1 (Note: Candidate John Goodlad stood in Orkney and Shetland.) |
| Red Front | 1 (Note: Candidate John Goodlad stood in Glasgow Central.) |
| Total | 308 |

== Analysis ==
While the Conservatives under Margaret Thatcher comfortably won a majority across the United Kingdom, the result saw the Conservatives suffer significant losses in Scotland as their vote share declined significantly in what The Glasgow Herald called "the humiliation of the Tories north of the border." Labour, who as well as gaining seats from the Conservatives also took two from the SNP and one from the SDP, now had more MPs from Scotland than at any other point in the party's history, including holding every seat in Glasgow, while the Conservatives were reduced to their lowest number since the Second World War.

Several prominent Scottish Conservative MPs, including Peter Fraser, Sir Alex Fletcher and Michael Ancram lost their seats, while George Younger, then Secretary of State for Defence, only very narrowly held his Ayr constituency after a recount. The Conservatives also had close results in Edinburgh West, where James Douglas-Hamilton's majority was reduced to 498 votes, and at Stirling where junior minister Michael Forsyth's majority fell from over 5,000 to 948 votes. The SNP's leader Gordon Wilson and the former leader of the SDP Roy Jenkins, also lost their seats to Labour challengers. Labour also took the Western Isles constituency from the SNP following the retirement of former SNP leader Donald Stewart, with the seat seeing an SNP to Labour swing of 19.6%. The SNP partially compensated for their losses by gaining three seats from the Conservatives, while the Conservatives also lost two seats to the Liberals.

In reaction to the poor Conservative performance compared with England, Scottish Secretary, Malcolm Rifkind, said "Of course I am disappointed. We have done well in the south, but not so well in Scotland." He noted that the recession had "bitten deeper" in Scotland than in England and that recovery had been slower. The defeated Sir Alex Fletcher stated that "There is no Tory press in Scotland. The papers up here are rather hostile to the Tory Party".

An editorial in The Glasgow Herald the day after the election argued that the results meant that "the case in favour of devolution is automatically strengthened", while also observing that the "patchy showing" by the SNP showed "that there is no general inclination for separatism".

== Results ==
| Party | Seats | | | | | Aggregate votes | | |
| Party | Total | Gains | Losses | Net | Of total (%) | Total | Of total (%) | Change (%) |
|---|---|---|---|---|---|---|---|---|
| Labour | 50 | 9 | 0 | ▲9 | 69.4 | 1,258,132 | 42.4 | ▲7.3 |
| Conservative | 10 | 0 | 11 | ▼11 | 13.9 | 713,081 | 24.0 | ▼4.4 |
| SDP–Liberal Alliance (Total) | 9 | 2 | 1 | ▲1 | 12.5 | 570,053 | 19.2 | ▼5.3 |
| Liberal | 7 | 2 | 0 | ▲2 | 9.7 | 307,210 | 10.4 | ▼2.2 |
| SDP | 2 | 0 | 1 | ▼1 | 2.8 | 262,843 | 8.9 | ▼3.0 |
| SNP | 3 | 2 | 3 | ▲1 | 4.2 | 416,473 | 14.0 | ▲2.2 |
| Green | 0 | 0 | 0 | Steady | — | 4,745 | 0.2 | ▲0.1 |
| Orkney and Shetland Movement | 0 | New | | | — | 3,095 | 0.1 | New |
| Communist | 0 | 0 | 0 | Steady | — | 1,187 | 0.0 | ▼0.1 |
| Independent Liberal | 0 | Did not stand in 1983 | | | — | 686 | 0.0 | —N/a |
| Independent | 0 | Did not stand in 1983 | | | — | 230 | 0.0 | —N/a |
| Red Front | 0 | New | | | — | 126 | 0.0 | New |
| Blank and invalid votes | | | | | | 2,520 | — | — |
| Total | 72 | | | 0 | 100.0 | 2,967,808 (Note: All valid votes excluding spoiled votes.) | 100.0 | 0.0 |
| Registered voters, and turnout | | | | | | 3,952,465 | 75.1 | ▲2.4 |

Popular vote
| Labour | 42.4% |
| Conservative | 24.0% |
| Alliance | 19.2% |
| SNP | 14.0% |
| Green | 0.2% |
| Other | 0.1% |

Parliamentary seats
| Labour | 69.4% |
| Conservative | 13.9% |
| Alliance | 12.5% |
| SNP | 4.2% |

== Incumbents defeated ==
| Party | Name | Constituency | Office held whilst in power | Year elected | Defeated by | Party |
|---|---|---|---|---|---|---|
| Conservative | Gerry Malone | Aberdeen South | | 1983 | Frank Doran | Labour |
| Conservative | The Rt Hon Peter Fraser | East Angus | Solicitor General for Scotland | 1979 | Andrew Welsh | SNP |
| Conservative | John MacKay | Argyll and Bute | Under-Secretary of State for Scotland | 1979 | Ray Mitchie | Liberal |
| Conservative | Sir Albert McQuarrie | Banff and Buchan | | 1979 | Alex Salmond | SNP |
| Conservative | John Corrie | Cunninghame North | | February 1974 | Brian Wilson | Labour |
| Conservative | Alexander MacPherson Fletcher | Edinburgh Central | | 1973 | Alistair Darling | Labour |
| Conservative | Barry Henderson | North East Fife | | 1979 | Menzies Campbell | Liberal |
| Conservative | Alexander Pollock | Moray | Parliamentary Private Secretary to the Secretary of State for Defence | 1979 | Margaret Ewing | SNP |
| Conservative | Anna McCurley | Renfrew West and Inverclyde | | 1983 | Tommy Graham | Labour |
| Conservative | Michael Hirst | Strathkelvin and Bearsden | | 1983 | Sam Galbraith | Labour |
| Conservative | The Rt Hon Michael Ancram, Earl of Ancram | Edinburgh South | | 1979 | Nigel Griffiths | Labour |
| SDP | The Rt Hon Roy Jenkins | Glasgow Hillhead | Former Leader of the Social Democratic Party | 1982 | George Galloway | Labour |
| SNP | Gordon Wilson | Dundee East | Leader of the Scottish National Party | February 1974 | John McAllion | Labour |
| SNP | Ian Smith (Note: Incumbent SNP seat, although incumbent MP was Donald Stewart.) | Western Isles | | —N/a | Calum MacDonald | Labour |

== See also ==
- 1987 United Kingdom general election in England
- 1987 United Kingdom general election in Northern Ireland
- 1987 United Kingdom general election in Wales
- List of MPs for constituencies in Scotland (1987–1992)
- List of United Kingdom Parliament constituencies (1983–1997) by region
