= 1987 Toledo, Ohio mayoral election =

1987 Toledo mayoral election
- November 3, 1987

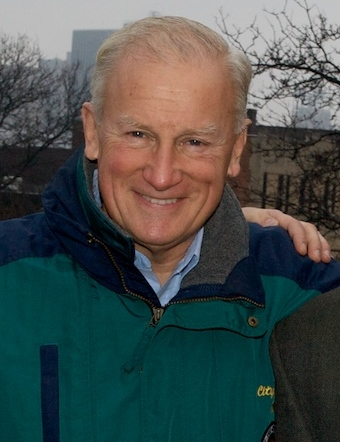
Candidate	Donna Owens	Carty Finkbeiner
Party	Nonpartisan	Nonpartisan
Popular vote	46,516	42,863
Percentage	51.99%	47.91%
Mayor before election
Donna Owens
Nonpartisan
Elected mayor
Donna Owens
Nonpartisan

The 1987 Toledo mayoral election took place on November 3, 1987. Incumbent Mayor Donna Owens ran for re-election to a second term, and was challenged by City Councilman Carty Finkbeiner. In the primary election, owing to an aggressive get-out-the-vote campaign, Finkbeiner placed first by a wide margin, winning 63 percent of the vote to Owens's 37 percent. The general election was significantly closer, however, and Owens ended up narrowly winning re-election, 52–48 percent.

== Primary election ==
=== Candidates ===
- Carty Finkbeiner, City Councilman (Democratic)
- Donna Owens, incumbent Mayor (Republican)
- Doug Thomson, retired chemical worker (write-in)
- John Radon, owner of adult entertainment establishment (write-in)

==== Declined ====
- Peter Ujvagi, City Councilman

=== Results ===
Primary election results
Party	Candidate	Votes	%
Nonpartisan	Carty Finkbeiner	20,423	62.76%
Nonpartisan	Donna Owens (inc.)	12,004	36.89%
Write-in		116	0.36%
Total votes		32,543	100.00%

== General election ==
=== Results ===
1987 Toledo mayoral election results
Party	Candidate	Votes	%
Nonpartisan	Donna Owens (inc.)	46,516	51.99%
Nonpartisan	Carty Finkbeiner	42,863	47.91%
Write-in		94	0.11%
Total votes		89,473	100.00%
