= 1987 United Kingdom general election in Wales =

UK general election

- 11 June 1987

All 38 Welsh seats to the House of Commons
- Turnout: 78.9% (▲2.8 pp)
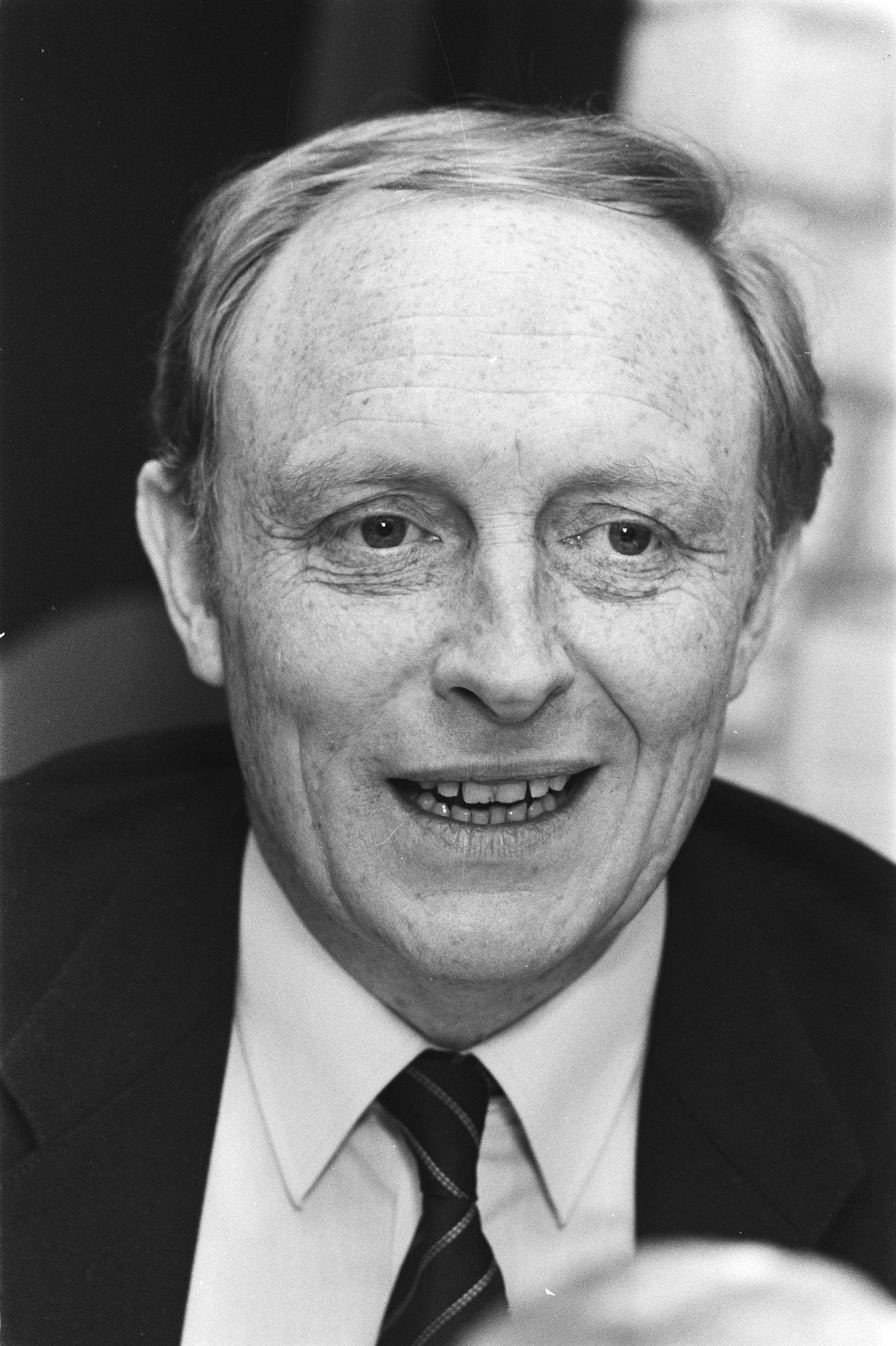

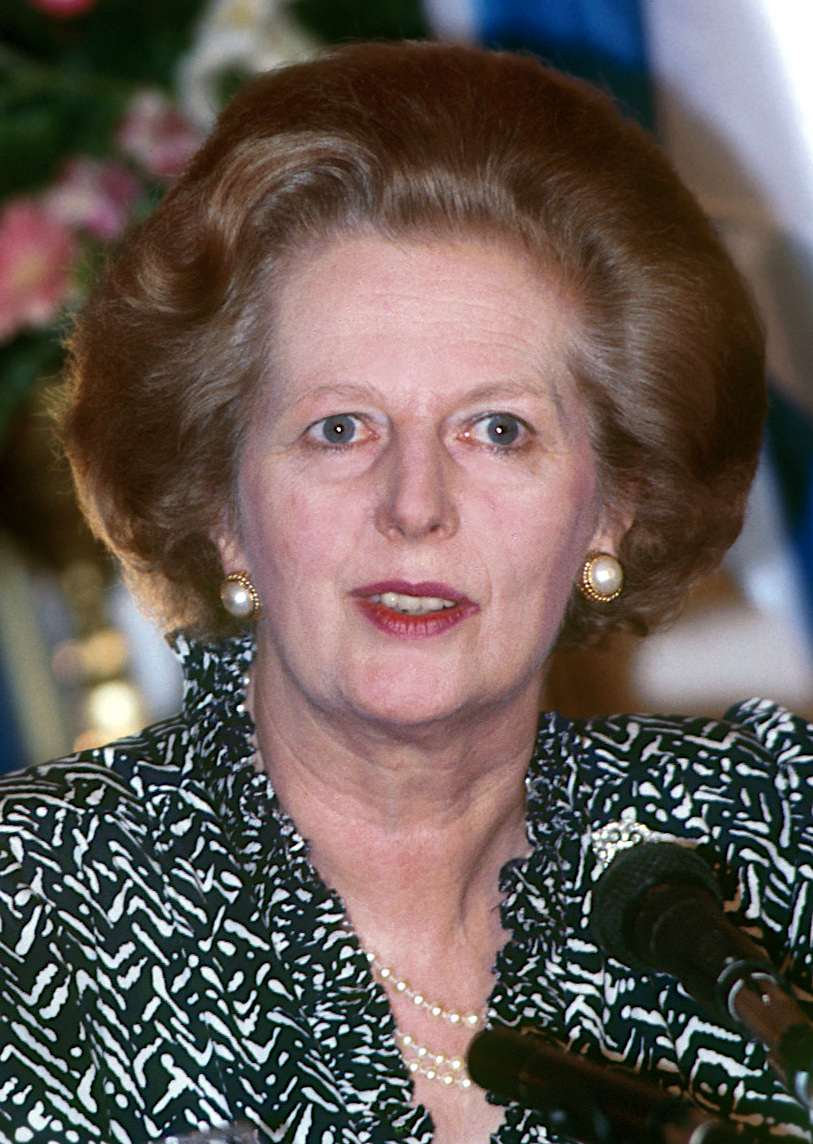

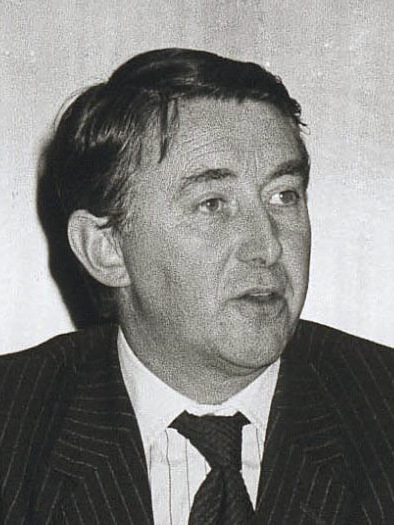

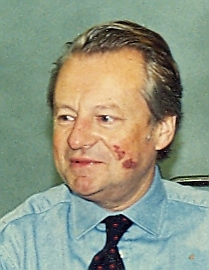

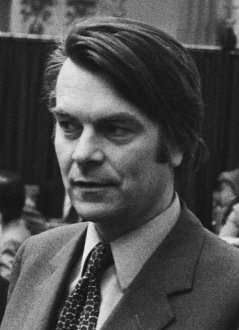
	First party	Second party	Third party
Leader	Neil Kinnock	Margaret Thatcher	David Steel
Party	Labour	Conservative	Liberal
Alliance			SDP–Liberal Alliance
Leader since	2 October 1983	11 February 1975	July 1976
Leader's seat	Islwyn	Finchley	Tweeddale, Ettrick and Lauderdale
Last election	20 seats, 37.5%	14 seats, 31.0%	2 seats, 12.1%
Seats won	24	8	3
Seat change	▲4	▼6	▲1
Popular vote	765,209	501,316	181,427
Percentage	45.1%	29.5%	10.7%
Swing	▲7.6 pp	▼1.5 pp	▼1.4 pp
	Fourth party	Fifth party
Leader	Dafydd Elis-Thomas	David Owen
Party	Plaid Cymru	SDP
Alliance		SDP–Liberal Alliance
Leader since	1984	21 June 1983
Leader's seat	Meirionnydd Nant Conwy	Plymouth Devonport
Last election	2 seats, 7.8%	0 seats, 11.1%
Seats won	3	0
Seat change	▲1	Steady
Popular vote	123,599	122,803
Percentage	7.3%	7.2%
Swing	▼0.5 pp	▼3.9 pp

On Thursday 11 June 1987, the 1987 United Kingdom general election was held to elect all 650 members of the House of Commons, with 38 constituencies being in Wales.

The Labour Party again won a majority of Welsh MPs, gaining four seats for a total of 24 out of 38. The governing Conservatives lost six seats, with the SDP–Liberal Alliance and Plaid Cymru gaining one each.

Despite Labour winning the most votes in Wales, across the UK the Conservatives won a landslide majority and continued in office for a third term.

== Background: pit closures ==
More than 25,000 Welsh colliers had lost their jobs in the decade of pit closures following the miners' strike of 1984. The coalfield communities in Wales still accounted for a quarter of the entire Welsh population in 2014. The closures caused the mining areas of Wales to have the lowest "job density" of all 16 coalfield communities across Wales (and lower job densities than the areas of Scotland and England also).

After the election, the coal mines of Abernant and Abercynon were closed in 1988, Cynheidre and Marine/Six Bells, Merthyr Vale, Oakdale and Trelewis were closed in 1989. Deep navigation and Penallta mines were also closed in 1991.

== Candidates ==
Below is a table summarising the candidates of the 1987 general election in Wales.

Affiliation	Candidates
Labour Party	38
Conservative and Unionist Party	38
Plaid Cymru	38
Liberal Party	20
Social Democratic Party	18
Green Party	4
Communist Party of Great Britain	1 (Note: Candidate Arthur True stood in Rhondda.)
Independent Labour	1 (Note: Candidate Thomas Spence stood in Ogmore.)
Total	158

== Results ==
Below is a table summarising the results of the 1987 general election in Wales.

Party	Seats					Aggregate votes		
Party	Total	Gains	Losses	Net	Of total (%)	Total	Of total (%)	Change (%)
Labour	24	4	0	▲4	63.2	765,209	45.1	▲7.6
Conservative	8	0	6	▼6	21.1	501,316	29.5	▼1.5
SDP–Liberal Alliance (Total)	3	1	0	▲1	7.9	304,230	17.9	▼5.3
Liberal	3	1	0	▲1	5.3	181,427	10.7	▼1.4
SDP	0	0	0	Steady	—	122,803	7.2	▼3.9
Plaid Cymru	3	1	0	▲1	7.9	123,599	7.3	▼0.5
Green	0	0	0	Steady	—	2,221	0.1	▼0.1
Communist	0	0	0	Steady	—	869	0.1	Steady
Independent Labour	0	Did not stand in 1983			—	652	0.0	—N/a
Blank and invalid votes						2,261	—	—
Total	38			0	100.0	1,698,096 (Note: All valid votes excluding spoiled votes.)	100.0	0.0
Registered voters, and turnout						2,151,352	78.9	▲2.8

Popular vote
Labour	45.1%
Conservative	29.5%
Alliance	17.9%
Plaid Cymru	7.3%
Green	0.1%
Other	0.1%

Parliament seats
Labour	63.2%
Conservative	21.1%
Alliance	7.9%
Plaid Cymru	7.9%

== See also ==
- 1987 United Kingdom general election in England
- 1987 United Kingdom general election in Scotland
- 1987 United Kingdom general election in Northern Ireland
- List of MPs for constituencies in Wales (1987–1992)
- List of United Kingdom Parliament constituencies (1983–1997) by region
