= 1987 United Kingdom general election =

- 11 June 1987

All 650 seats in the House of Commons 326 (Note: The sole Sinn Féin MP to be elected, Gerry Adams, did not take his seat, so the effective number of seats in the House of Commons was 649, making a majority 325 seats.) seats needed for a majority
- Opinion polls
- Registered: 43,180,753
- Turnout: 32,529,578; 75.3% (▲2.6 pp)

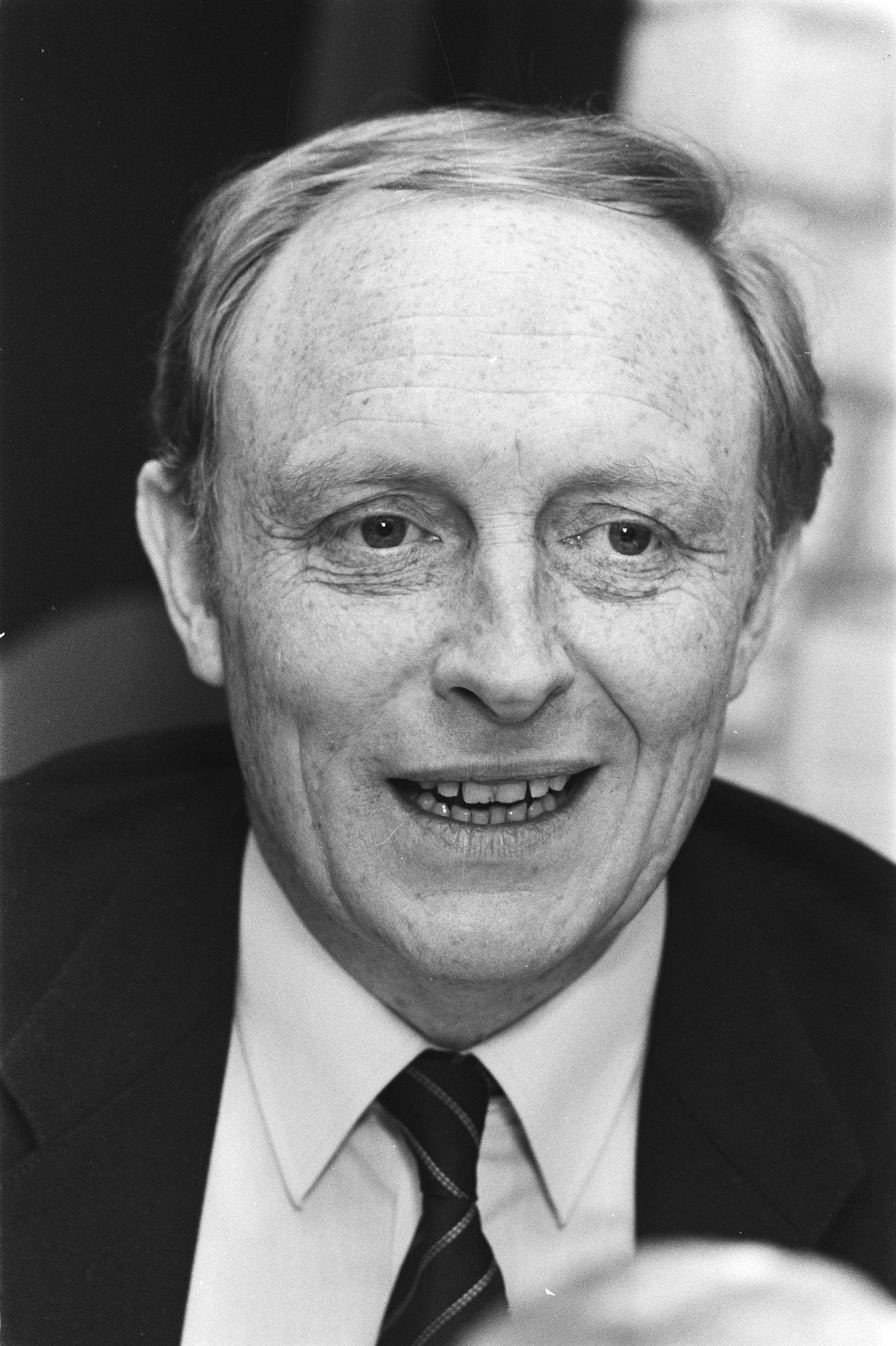

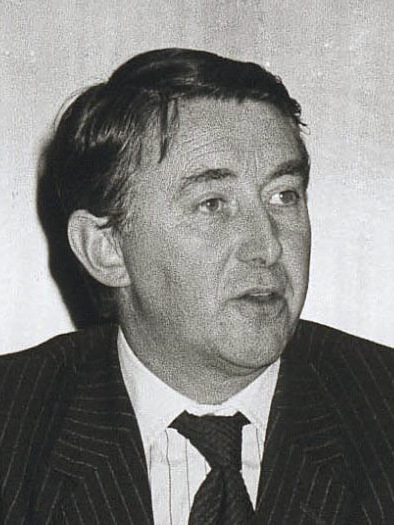

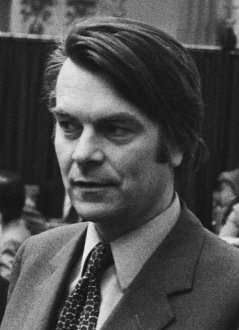
| | First party | Second party | Third party |
|---|---|---|---|
| Leader | Margaret Thatcher | Neil Kinnock | David Steel (Lib.); David Owen (SDP) |
| Party | Conservative | Labour | Alliance |
| Leader since | 11 February 1975 | 2 October 1983 | 7 July 1976 / 21 June 1983 |
| Leader's seat | Finchley | Islwyn | Tweeddale, Ettrick and Lauderdale / Plymouth Devonport |
| Last election | 397 seats, 42.4% | 209 seats, 27.6% | 23 seats, 25.4% |
| Seats won | 376 (Note: Figure includes Speaker of the House of Commons Bernard Weatherill in Croydon North East.) | 229 | 22 |
| Seat change | ▼21 | ▲20 | ▼1 |
| Popular vote | 13,760,583 | 10,029,807 | 7,341,633 |
| Percentage | 42.3% | 30.8% | 22.6% |
| Swing | ▼0.1 pp | ▲3.2 pp | ▼2.8 pp |
- Colours denote the winning party—as shown in § Results

- Composition of the House of Commons after the election
Prime Minister before election
Margaret Thatcher
Conservative
Prime Minister after election
Margaret Thatcher
Conservative

A general election was held in the United Kingdom on Thursday 11 June 1987, to elect 650 members to the House of Commons. This was the third consecutive general election victory for the Conservative Party, which won a second landslide under leader Margaret Thatcher, who became the first Prime Minister since the Earl of Liverpool in 1820 to lead a party into three successive electoral victories. The Conservatives were returned to government with a net loss of only 21 seats, which left them with 376 MPs and a reduced but still overwhelming majority of 102 seats. The Conservatives have not matched or surpassed this seat total in any subsequent general election, although they recorded a greater share of the popular vote in the 2019 general election.

The Conservatives ran a campaign focusing on lower taxes, a strong economy and strong defence. They also emphasised that unemployment had just fallen below the three million mark for the first time since 1981, and inflation was standing at 4%, its lowest level since the 1960s. National newspapers also continued to largely back the Conservative government, particularly The Sun, which ran articles against the Labour Party, led by Neil Kinnock, with headlines such as "Why I'm backing Kinnock, by Stalin".

Following Michael Foot's resignation in the aftermath of Labour's landslide defeat at the 1983 general election, Kinnock was slowly moving the party towards a more centrist policy platform, following the promulgation of a left-wing one under Foot's leadership. Kinnock's main aim was to re-establish the party as the main progressive centre-left alternative to the Conservatives, after the rise of the Social Democratic Party (SDP) forced Labour onto the defensive, and he succeeded in doing so at this general election. Labour increased its vote share in Scotland, Wales and the North of England, but still returned only 229 MPs to Westminster. In London, the Conservatives made gains in several previously Labour-held constituencies.

The Alliance between the SDP and the Liberal Party was renewed, but co-leaders David Owen and David Steel could not agree whether to support either major party in the event of a hung parliament. The election was a disappointment for the Alliance, which saw its vote share fall and suffered a net loss of one seat as well as former SDP leader Roy Jenkins losing his seat to Labour. This led to the two Alliance parties merging completely soon afterwards to become the Liberal Democrats. In Northern Ireland, the main unionist parties maintained their alliance in opposition to the Anglo-Irish Agreement; however, the Ulster Unionist Party (UUP) lost two seats to the Social Democratic and Labour Party (SDLP). One of the UUP losses was former Cabinet Minister Enoch Powell, famous for his stance against immigration, and formerly a Conservative MP.

The election night was covered live on the BBC, presented by David Dimbleby, Peter Snow and Robin Day. It was also broadcast on ITV, presented by Alastair Burnet, Peter Sissons and Alastair Stewart.

The 1987 general election saw the election of the first Black Members of Parliament: Diane Abbott, Paul Boateng and Bernie Grant, all as representatives for the Labour Party. Other newcomers included future Cabinet members David Blunkett, John Redwood, John Reid, Andrew Smith and Alistair Darling, future Shadow Cabinet minister Ann Widdecombe, and future SNP Leader Alex Salmond. MPs who left the House of Commons as a result of this election include former Labour Prime Minister James Callaghan, Keith Joseph, Jim Prior, Ian Mikardo, former SDP leader and Labour Cabinet Minister Roy Jenkins, former Health Minister Enoch Powell (who had defected to the UUP in Northern Ireland from the Conservatives in 1974) and Clement Freud.

== Campaign and policies ==
The Conservative campaign emphasised lower taxes, a strong economy and defence, and also employed rapid-response reactions to take advantage of Labour errors. Norman Tebbit and Saatchi & Saatchi spearheaded the Conservative campaign. However, when on "Wobbly Thursday" it was rumoured a Marplan opinion poll showed a narrow 2% Conservative lead, the "exiles" camp of David Young, Tim Bell and the advertising firm Young & Rubicam advocated a more aggressively anti-Labour message. This was when, according to Young's memoirs, Young grabbed Tebbit by the lapels and shook him, shouting: "Norman, listen to me, we're about to lose this fucking election." In his memoirs, Tebbit defends the Conservative campaign: "We finished exactly as planned on the ground where Labour was weak and we were strong—defence, taxation, and the economy." During the election campaign, however, Tebbit and party leader Margaret Thatcher argued.

Bell and Saatchi & Saatchi produced memorable posters for the Conservatives, such as a picture of a British soldier's arms raised in surrender with the caption "Labour's Policy On Arms"—a reference to Labour's policy of unilateral nuclear disarmament. The first Conservative party political broadcast played on the theme of "Freedom" and ended with a fluttering Union Jack, the hymn I Vow to Thee, My Country (which Thatcher would later quote in her "Sermon on the Mound") and the slogan "It's Great To Be Great Again".

The Labour campaign was a marked change from previous efforts; professionally directed by Peter Mandelson and Bryan Gould, it concentrated on presenting and improving Neil Kinnock's image to the electorate. Labour's first party political broadcast, dubbed Kinnock: The Movie, was directed by Hugh Hudson of Chariots of Fire fame, and concentrated on portraying Kinnock as a caring, compassionate family man. It was filmed at the Great Orme in Wales and had "Ode to Joy" and Brahms' 1st Symphony as its music. He was particularly critical of the high unemployment that the government's economic policies had resulted in, as well as condemning the wait for treatment that many patients had endured on the National Health Service. Kinnock's personal popularity jumped 16 points overnight following the initial broadcast.

On 24 May, Kinnock was interviewed by David Frost and claimed that Labour's alternative defence strategy in the event of a Soviet attack would be "using the resources you've got to make any occupation totally untenable". In a speech two days later Thatcher attacked Labour's defence policy as a programme for "defeat, surrender, occupation, and finally, prolonged guerrilla fighting ... I do not understand how anyone who aspires to Government can treat the defence of our country so lightly".

During the 1987 election campaign the Conservative Party issued attack posters which alleged that the Labour Party wanted the book Young, Gay and Proud to be read in schools, as well as Police: Out of School, The Playbook for Kids about Sex, (Note: Authored by Joani Blank) and The Milkman's on his Way, (Note: Authored by David Rees) which, according to the Monday Club's Jill Knight MP – who introduced Section 28 and later campaigned against same-sex marriage – were being taught to "little children as young as five and six", which contained "brightly coloured pictures of little stick men showed all about homosexuality and how it was done", and "explicitly described homosexual intercourse and, indeed, glorified it, encouraging youngsters to believe that it was better than any other sexual way of life".

== Endorsements ==
The following newspapers endorsed political parties running in the election in the following ways:

| Newspaper | Party/ies endorsed |
|---|---|
| The Sun | Conservative Party |
| Daily Mirror | Labour Party |
| Daily Mail | Conservative Party |
| Daily Express | Conservative Party |
| Daily Telegraph | Conservative Party |
| The Guardian | Labour Party |
| The Independent | None |
| The Times | Conservative Party |

== Opinion polling ==
Conservative Labour SDP–Liberal Alliance

== Timeline ==
The Prime Minister Margaret Thatcher visited Buckingham Palace on 11 May and asked the Queen to dissolve Parliament on 18 May, announcing that the election would be held on 11 June. The key dates were as follows:

| Monday 18 May | Dissolution of the 49th Parliament and campaigning officially begins |
| Wednesday 10 June | Campaigning officially ends |
| Thursday 11 June | Polling day |
| Friday 12 June | The Conservative Party wins with a majority of 102 to retain power |
| Wednesday 17 June | 50th Parliament assembles |
| Thursday 25 June | State Opening of Parliament |

== Results ==
The Conservatives were returned by a second landslide victory after their first in 1983, with a comfortable majority, down slightly on 1983 with a swing of 1.5% towards Labour. This marked the first time since the Great Reform Act of 1832 that a party leader had won three consecutive elections, although the Conservatives had won consecutively in the 1950s under three different leaders (Churchill in 1951, Eden in 1955 and Macmillan in 1959) and early in the century, the Liberals also had three successive wins under two leaders (Henry Campbell-Bannerman in 1906 and H. H. Asquith twice in 1910). The Conservative lead over Labour of 11.4% was the second-greatest for any party since the Second World War; surpassed only by the previous 1983 result.

The BBC announced the result at 02:35. Increasing polarisation marked divisions across the country; the Conservatives dominated Southern England and took additional seats from Labour in London and the rest of the South, but performed less well in Northern England, Scotland and Wales, losing many of the seats they had won there at previous elections. Yet the overall result of this election proved that Margaret Thatcher's policies retained significant support.

Despite initial optimism and the professional campaign by Neil Kinnock, the election brought only twenty additional seats for Labour from the 1983 Conservative landslide. In many southern areas, the Labour vote actually fell, with the party losing seats in London. However, it represented a decisive victory against the SDP–Liberal Alliance and marked out the Labour Party as the main contender to the Conservative Party. This was in stark contrast to 1983, when the Alliance votes almost matched Labour; although Labour had almost 10 times as many seats as the Alliance due to the structure of the First-Past-The-Post voting system.

The result for the Alliance was a disappointment, in that they had hoped to overtake Labour as the Official Opposition in the UK in terms of vote share. Instead, they lost Roy Jenkins' seat and saw their vote share drop by almost 3%, with a widening gap of 8% between them and the Labour Party (compared to a 2% gap four years before). These results would eventually lead to the end of the Alliance and the birth of the Liberal Democrats.

Most of the prominent MPs retained their seats. Notable losses included: Enoch Powell (the controversial former Conservative Cabinet Minister who had defected to the Ulster Unionist Party), Gordon Wilson (leader of the Scottish National Party) and two Alliance members: Liberal Clement Freud and former SDP leader Roy Jenkins (a former Labour Home Secretary and Chancellor of the Exchequer). Neil Kinnock increased his share of the vote in Islwyn by almost 12%. Margaret Thatcher increased her share of the vote in her Finchley seat, but the Labour vote increased more, slightly reducing her majority.

In Northern Ireland, the various unionist parties maintained an electoral pact (with few dissenters) in opposition to the Anglo-Irish Agreement. However, the Ulster Unionists lost two seats to the Social Democratic and Labour Party.

The Conservatives' victory could also arguably be attributed to the rise in living standards during their time in office. As noted by Dennis Kavanagh and David Butler:

Since 1987 the Conservatives had located a large constituency of "winners", people who have an interest in the return of a Conservative government. It includes much of the affluent South, home-owners, share-owners, and most of those in work, whose standard of living, measured in post-tax incomes, has risen appreciably since 1979.

=== Summary of seats returned ===
| Party | Leader | MPs | | Aggregate votes | |
| Party | Leader | | Of total | | Of total |
|---|---|---|---|---|---|
| Conservative and Unionist Party | Margaret Thatcher | 376 | 57.8% | 13,760,583 | 42.3% |
| Labour Party | Neil Kinnock | 229 (Note: Includes 9 Co-operative Party MP, as part of the Labour-Co-op alliance.) | 35.2% | 10,029,807 | 30.8% |
| SDP–Liberal Alliance | —N/a | 22 | 3.4% | 7,341,633 | 22.6% |
| Liberal Party | David Steel | 17 | 2.6% | 4,173,450 | 12.8% |
| Social Democratic Party | David Owen | 5 | 0.8% | 3,168,183 | 9.7% |
| Ulster Unionist Party | James Molyneaux | 9 | 1.4% | 276,230 | 0.8% |
| Scottish National Party | Gordon Wilson | 3 | 0.5% | 416,473 | 1.3% |
| Social Democratic and Labour Party | John Hume | 3 | 0.5% | 154,087 | 0.5% |
| Plaid Cymru | Dafydd Elis-Thomas | 3 | 0.5% | 123,599 | 0.4% |
| Democratic Unionist Party | Ian Paisley | 3 | 0.5% | 85,642 | 0.3% |
| Sinn Féin | Gerry Adams | 1 | 0.2% | 83,389 | 0.3% |
| Ulster Popular Unionist Party | James Kilfedder | 1 | 0.2% | 18,420 | 0.1% |

=== Full results ===

Results of the June 1987 general election to the House of Commons of the United Kingdom
| Party | Leader | Candidates | MPs | | | | | Aggregate votes | | |
| Party | Leader | Candidates | Total | Gains | Losses | Net | Of all (%) | Total | Of all (%) | Change (%) |
|---|---|---|---|---|---|---|---|---|---|---|
| Conservative | Margaret; Thatcher | 633 | 376 | 9 | 30 | ▼21 | 57.9 | 13,760,583 | 42.3 | ▼0.1 |
| Labour | Neil; Kinnock | 633 (Note: Includes 20 Co-operative Party candidates, as part of the Labour-Co-op alliance.) | 229 (Note: Includes 9 Co-operative Party MPs, as part of the Labour-Co-op alliance.) | 26 | 6 | ▲20 (Note: Includes ▲2 Co-operative Party MPs, as part of the Labour-Co-op alliance.) | 35.2 (Note: Includes 1.3% for the Co-operative Party, as part of the Labour-Co-op alliance.) | 10,029,807 (Note: Includes 334,132 for the Co-operative Party, as part of the Labour-Co-op alliance.) | 30.8 (Note: Includes 1.0% for the Co-operative Party, as part of the Labour-Co-op alliance.) | ▲3.2 (Note: Includes 0.0% for the Co-operative Party, as part of the Labour-Co-op alliance.) |
| SDP–Liberal; Alliance | —N/a | 633 | 22 | 5 | 6 | ▼1 | 3.4 | 7,341,633 | 22.6 | ▼2.8 |
| Liberal | David; Steel | 327 | 17 | 4 | 4 | Steady | 2.6 | 4,173,450 | 12.8 | ▼0.9 |
| SDP | David; Owen | 306 | 5 | 1 (Note: Rosie Barnes in Greenwich.) | 2 | ▼1 | 0.8 | 3,168,183 | 9.7 | ▼1.9 |
| SNP | Gordon; Wilson | 71 | 3 | 2 | 3 | ▲1 | 0.5 | 416,473 | 1.3 | ▲0.2 |
| UUP | James; Molyneaux | 12 | 9 | 0 | 2 | ▼2 | 1.4 | 276,230 | 0.8 | Steady |
| SDLP | John; Hume | 13 | 3 | 2 | 0 | ▲2 | 0.5 | 154,087 | 0.5 | ▲0.1 |
| Plaid Cymru | Dafydd; Elis-Thomas | 38 | 3 | 1 | 0 | ▲1 | 0.5 | 123,599 | 0.4 | Steady |
| Green | Multiple; Leaders | 133 | 0 | 0 | 0 | Steady | — | 89,753 | 0.3 | ▲0.1 |
| DUP | Ian; Paisley | 4 | 3 | 0 | 0 | Steady | 0.5 | 85,642 | 0.3 | ▼0.2 |
| Sinn Féin | Gerry; Adams | 14 | 1 | 0 | 0 | Steady | 0.2 | 83,389 | 0.3 | Steady |
| Alliance | John; Alderdice | 16 | 0 | 0 | 0 | Steady | — | 72,761 | 0.2 | Steady |
| Workers' Party | Tomás; Mac Giolla | 14 | 0 | 0 | 0 | Steady | — | 19,294 | 0.1 | ▲0.1 |
| UPUP | James; Kilfedder | 1 | 1 | 0 | 0 | Steady | 0.2 | 18,420 | 0.1 | Steady |
| Real Unionist | Robert; McCartney | 1 | 0 | New | | | — | 14,467 | 0.1 | New |
| Communist | Gordon; McLennan | 19 | 0 | 0 | 0 | Steady | — | 6,078 | 0.0 | Steady |
| Protestant Unionist | George; Seawright | 1 | 0 | New | | | — | 5,671 | 0.0 | New |
| Independent | —N/a | 12 | 0 | 0 | 0 | Steady | — | 4,522 | 0.0 | ▼0.1 |
| Independent; Conservative | —N/a | 5 | 0 | 0 | 0 | Steady | — | 3,781 | 0.0 | ▼0.1 |
| Red; Front | —N/a | 14 | 0 | New | | | — | 3,177 | 0.0 | New |
| Orkney and Shetland Movement | John; Goodlad | 1 | 0 | New | | | — | 3,095 | 0.0 | New |
| Moderate Labour | Brian; Marshall | 2 | 0 | New | | | — | 2,269 | 0.0 | New |
| Monster Raving Loony | David; Sutch | 5 | 0 | 0 | 0 | Steady | — | 1,951 | 0.0 | Steady |
| Workers Revolutionary | Sheila; Torrance | 10 | 0 | 0 | 0 | Steady | — | 1,721 | 0.0 | Steady |
| Independent; Labour | —N/a | 3 | 0 | 0 | 0 | Steady | — | 1,879 | 0.0 | ▼0.1 |
| Independent; Liberal | —N/a | 1 | 0 | 0 | 0 | Steady | — | 686 | 0.0 | Steady |
| Gaitskell; Labour | —N/a | 1 | 0 | New | | | — | 638 | 0.0 | New |
| BNP | John; Tyndall | 2 | 0 | 0 | 0 | Steady | — | 553 | 0.0 | Steady |
| Spare the Earth | —N/a | 1 | 0 | 0 | 0 | Steady | — | 522 | 0.0 | Steady |
| Fancy Dress | John; Crockford | 1 | 0 | 0 | 0 | Steady | — | 491 | 0.0 | Steady |
| 657; Party | —N/a | 1 | 0 | New | | | — | 455 | 0.0 | New |
| OOBPC; Candidate | —N/a | 1 | 0 | New | | | — | 435 | 0.0 | New |
| Democrat; Independent | —N/a | 1 | 0 | New | | | — | 408 | 0.0 | New |
| Restore Capital; Punishment | —N/a | 1 | 0 | New | | | — | 405 | 0.0 | New |
| Ex-Labour; Moderate | —N/a | 1 | 0 | New | | | — | 397 | 0.0 | New |
| Creek Road; Fresh Bread | —N/a | 1 | 0 | New | | | — | 373 | 0.0 | New |
| Humanist; Party | —N/a | 4 | 0 | New | | | — | 353 | 0.0 | New |
| Blancmange; Towers | —N/a | 1 | 0 | New | | | — | 328 | 0.0 | New |
| Rainbow Dream Ticket | Rainbow; George Weiss | 2 (Note: The candidates that stood were Rainbow George Weiss in Hampstead and Highgate, and Francis Jackson in Norwood who stood under the label of 'Rainbow'.) | 0 | New | | | — | 308 | 0.0 | New |
| National Front | Martin; Wingfield | 1 | 0 | 0 | 0 | Steady | — | 286 | 0.0 | ▼0.1 |
| Northern Ireland; Ecology | —N/a | 1 | 0 | 0 | 0 | Steady | — | 281 | 0.0 | Steady |
| Male; OAP | —N/a | 1 | 0 | New | | | — | 283 | 0.0 | New |
| Feudal; Party | —N/a | 1 | 0 | New | | | — | 263 | 0.0 | New |
| RRPRC; Candidate | —N/a | 1 | 0 | New | | | — | 232 | 0.0 | New |
| All Party Anti- Common Market | —N/a | 1 | 0 | New | | | — | 217 | 0.0 | New |
| LAPP; Candidate | —N/a | 1 | 0 | New | | | — | 209 | 0.0 | New |
| PRP; Candidate | —N/a | 1 | 0 | New | | | — | 185 | 0.0 | New |
| CPWSML; Candidate | —N/a | 1 | 0 | New | | | — | 175 | 0.0 | New |
| Canterbury; Nationalist | —N/a | 1 | 0 | New | | | — | 157 | 0.0 | New |
| Christian; Democrat | —N/a | 1 | 0 | New | | | — | 151 | 0.0 | New |
| Gremloids; Party | —N/a | 1 | 0 | New | | | — | 131 | 0.0 | New |
| CSOSMG; Candidate | —N/a | 1 | 0 | New | | | — | 125 | 0.0 | New |
| CPRP; Candidate | —N/a | 1 | 0 | New | | | — | 110 | 0.0 | New |
| Socialist (GB) | Collective; Leadership | 1 | 0 | 0 | 0 | Steady | — | 81 | 0.0 | Steady |
| Fellowship; Party | Ronald; Mallone | 1 | 0 | 0 | 0 | Steady | — | 59 | 0.0 | Steady |
| Gold; Party | —N/a | 1 | 0 | New | | | — | 59 | 0.0 | New |
| Public Independent; Plaintiff | —N/a | 1 | 0 | New | | | — | 30 | 0.0 | New |
| Blank and invalid votes | | | | | | | | 36,945 | — | — |
| Total | | 2,325 | 650 | | | 0 | 100.0 | 32,529,578 (Note: All valid votes excluding spoiled votes.) | 100.0 | 0.0 |
| Registered voters, and turnout | | | | | | | | 43,180,753 | 75.3 | ▲2.6 |

=== Votes summary ===
Seats won in the election (outer ring) against number of votes (inner)

Popular vote
| Conservative | 42.3% |
| Labour | 30.8% |
| SDP–Liberal | 22.6% |
| Scottish National | 1.3% |
| Ulster Unionist | 0.9% |
| Others | 2.2% |

=== Seats summary ===
Parliamentary seats
| Conservative | 57.9% |
| Labour | 35.2% |
| SDP–Liberal | 3.4% |
| Ulster Unionist | 1.4% |
| Others | 2.2% |

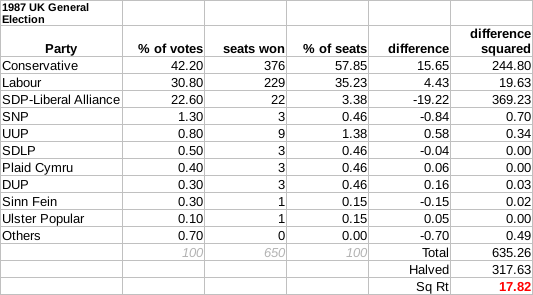
The Gallagher Index of disproportionality of the 1987 election was 17.82, between the Alliance and the Conservatives.

=== Results by voter characteristics ===
Ethnic group voting intention
| Ethnic group | Party | | | |
| Ethnic group | Labour | Conservative | SDP/Lib | Other |
|---|---|---|---|---|
| Ethnic minority (non-White) | 72% | 18% | n/a | 10% |
| Asian | 67% | 23% | 10% | n/a |
| Afro-Caribbean | 86% | 6% | 7% | n/a |

== Incumbents defeated ==
| Party | Name | Constituency | Office held whilst in power | Year elected | Defeated by | Party |
|---|---|---|---|---|---|---|
| Conservative | Gerry Malone | Aberdeen South | | 1983 | Frank Doran | Labour |
| Conservative | The Rt Hon Peter Fraser | East Angus | Solicitor General for Scotland | 1979 | Andrew Welsh | SNP |
| Conservative | John MacKay | Argyll and Bute | Under-Secretary of State for Scotland | 1979 | Ray Michie | Liberal |
| Conservative | Sir Albert McQuarrie | Banff and Buchan | | 1979 | Alex Salmond | SNP |
| Conservative | Geoffrey Lawler | Bradford North | | 1983 | Pat Wall | Labour |
| Conservative | Peter Hubbard-Miles | Bridgend | Parliamentary Private Secretary to the Secretary of State for Wales | 1983 | Win Griffiths | Labour |
| Conservative | Stefan Terlezki | Cardiff West | | 1983 | Rhodri Morgan | Labour |
| Conservative | Robert Harvey | Clwyd South West | | 1983 | Martyn Jones | Labour |
| Conservative | John Corrie | Cunninghame North | | February 1974 | Brian Wilson | Labour |
| Conservative | John Whitfield | Dewsbury | | 1983 | Ann Taylor | Labour |
| Conservative | Alexander MacPherson Fletcher | Edinburgh Central | | 1973 | Alistair Darling | Labour |
| Conservative | Steven Norris | Oxford East | | 1983 | Andrew Smith | Labour |
| Conservative | Barry Henderson | North East Fife | | 1979 | Menzies Campbell | Liberal |
| Conservative | Richard Hickmet | Glanford and Scunthorpe | | 1983 | Elliot Morley | Labour |
| Conservative | Roy Galley | Halifax | | 1983 | Alice Mahon | Labour |
| Conservative | Peter Bruinvels | Leicester East | | 1983 | Keith Vaz | Labour |
| Conservative | Derek Spencer | Leicester South | | 1983 | Jim Marshall | Labour |
| Conservative | Fred Silvester | Manchester Withington | | February 1974 | Keith Bradley | Labour |
| Conservative | Alexander Pollock | Moray | Parliamentary private secretary to the Secretary of State for Defence | 1979 | Margaret Ewing | SNP |
| Conservative | Piers Merchant | Newcastle upon Tyne Central | | 1983 | Jim Cousins | Labour |
| Conservative | Mark Robinson | Newport West | | 1983 | Paul Flynn | Labour |
| Conservative | Richard Ottaway | Nottingham North | | 1983 | Graham Allen | Labour |
| Conservative | Anna McCurley | Renfrew West and Inverclyde | | 1983 | Tommy Graham | Labour |
| Conservative | Michael Hirst | Strathkelvin and Bearsden | | 1983 | Sam Galbraith | Labour |
| Conservative | Warren Hawksley | The Wrekin | | 1979 | Bruce Grocott | Labour |
| Conservative | John Powley | Norwich South | | 1983 | John Garrett | Labour |
| Conservative | The Rt Hon Michael Ancram, Earl of Ancram | Edinburgh South | | 1979 | Nigel Griffiths | Labour |
| Labour | Alfred Dubs | Battersea | | 1979 | John Bowis | Conservative |
| Labour | Willie Hamilton | Central Fife (stood in South Hams) | | 1950 | Anthony Steen | Conservative |
| Labour | Nick Raynsford | Fulham | | 1986 | Matthew Carrington | Conservative |
| Labour | Ken Weetch | Ipswich | | October 1974 | Michael Irvine | Conservative |
| Labour | Oonagh McDonald | Thurrock | Opposition Spokesman on Treasury and Economic Affairs | 1976 | Tim Janman | Conservative |
| Labour | Eric Deakins | Walthamstow | | 1970 | Hugo Summerson | Conservative |
| Liberal | Sir Clement Freud | North East Cambridgeshire | | 1973 | Malcolm Moss | Conservative |
| Liberal | Michael Meadowcroft | Leeds West | | 1983 | John Battle | Labour |
| Liberal | Elizabeth Shields | Ryedale | | 1986 | John Greenway | Conservative |
| SDP | The Rt Hon Roy Jenkins | Glasgow Hillhead | Former Leader of the Social Democratic Party | 1982 | George Galloway | Labour |
| SDP | Mike Hancock | Portsmouth South | | 1984 | David Martin | Conservative |
| SDP | Ian Wrigglesworth | Stockton South | | February 1974 | Tim Devlin | Conservative |
| SNP | Gordon Wilson | Dundee East | Leader of the Scottish National Party | February 1974 | John McAllion | Labour |
| UUP | Brig the Rt Hon Enoch Powell | South Down | | 1950 | Eddie McGrady | SDLP |

== See also ==
- List of MPs elected in the 1987 United Kingdom general election
- 1987 United Kingdom general election in England
- 1987 United Kingdom general election in Scotland
- 1987 United Kingdom general election in Wales
- 1987 United Kingdom general election in Northern Ireland
- 1987 United Kingdom local elections

== Manifestos ==
- The Next Moves Forward, 1987 Conservative Party manifesto
- Britain will win with Labour, 1987 Labour Party manifesto
- Britain United: The Time Has Come, 1987 SDP–Liberal Alliance manifesto
