= Donna Owens =

American politician (born 1936)

56th Mayor of Toledo
- In office 1983–1989
- Preceded by: Douglas DeGood
- Succeeded by: John McHugh

Personal details
- Born: August 24, 1936 (age 89) Toledo, Ohio, U.S.
- Party: Republican
- Relations: Married
- Children: 3
- Education: Stautzenberger College
- Occupation: Former director of the Bureau of Justice Assistance

Donna M. Owens (born August 24, 1936) is an American Republican politician who served as the first female mayor of Toledo, Ohio, from 1983 until 1989. As of 2022, she is the most recent person elected mayor of Toledo only as a Republican.

== Background ==
Owens was born in Toledo, Ohio and graduated from Stautzenberger College. She served on the Lucas County Board of Education from 1976 until 1979. She is married with three children and resides in Toledo.

== Political career ==
Owens served as a Toledo city councilwoman from 1979 until 1983, when she successfully ran for city mayor, making her the first female to hold the position. She was re-elected for a second term in 1985. In November 1987, Owens was elected to a third term after defeating Democratic opponent Carty Finkbeiner with 46,378 votes to his 42,787. Her election marked the first time a Republican had won three consecutive mayoral terms in Toledo since 1879.

In 1988, Owens spoke before a joint session of Congress on the role of military intervention in the war on drugs. She stressed the need for devoting more resources to combating the import of crack cocaine, and suggested using aircraft such as AWACS, E-2Cs or P-3s to assist in detecting and intercepting drug traffickers.

Owens also made history as the first woman to serve as Chair of the State Employment Relations Board.

Owens has not held any public office since her third term ended in 1989. On August 30, 1990, she was nominated to the position of Director of the Bureau of Justice Assistance at the Department of Justice.

In June 2006, Owens was found guilty on misdemeanor charges for failing to disclose political contributions from Republican donor Tom Noe. Noe and 14 other individuals faced ranges of charges related to his money laundering scheme during the 2004 Bush-Cheney presidential campaign in the "Coingate" scandal. Owens, along with Lucas County Commissioner Maggie Thurber, Toledo City Councilman Betty Shultz, and former state representative Sally Perz all pleaded no contest and were fined $1000, plus additional investigative and court costs.

In October 2016, Owens made opening remarks at the Seagate Convention Center at a campaign rally for presidential candidate Donald Trump.
