= 1987 United Kingdom general election in Northern Ireland =

- 11 June 1987

All 17 Northern Ireland seats in the House of Commons
- Turnout: 67.0% (▼5.9 pp)
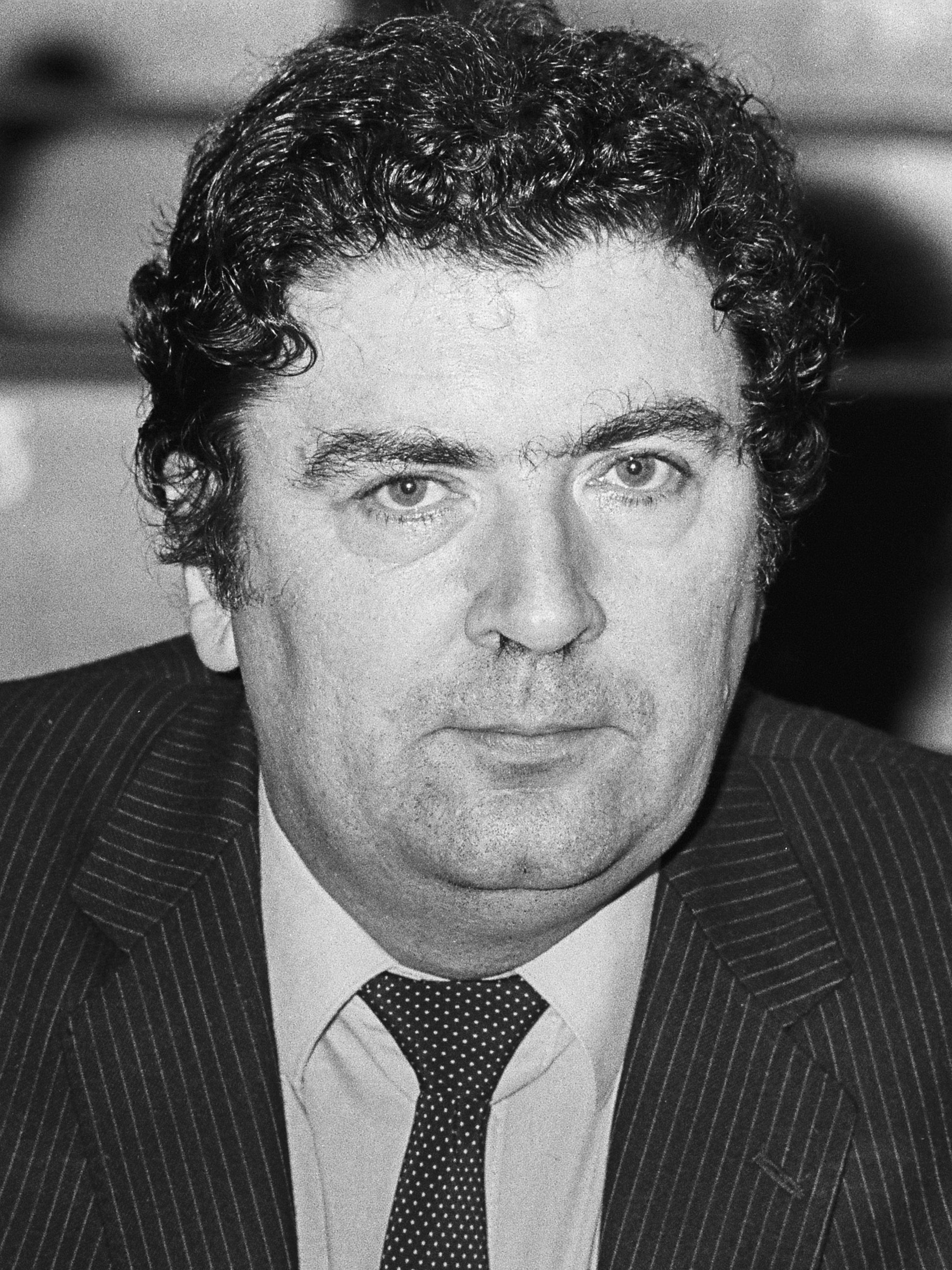

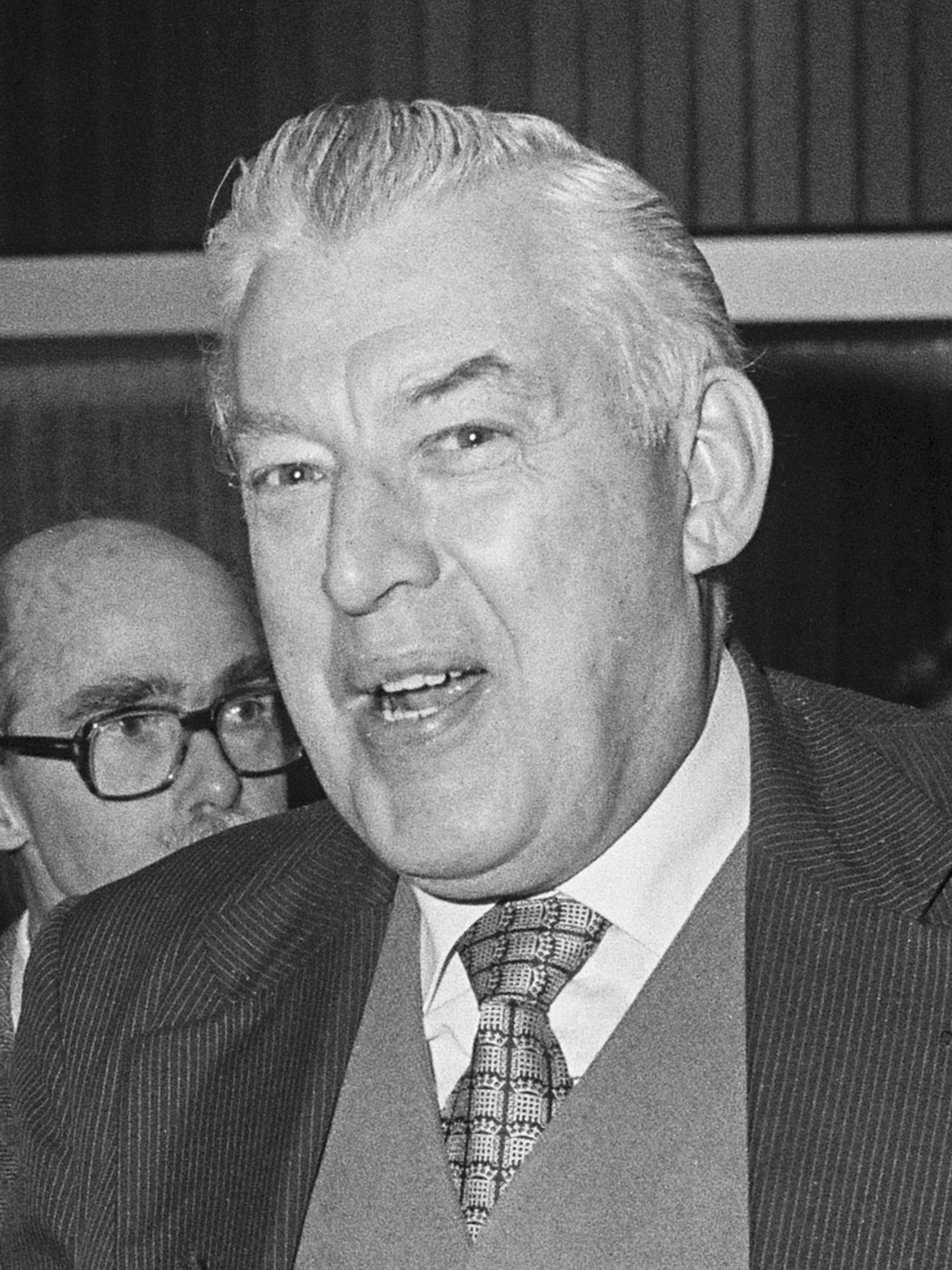

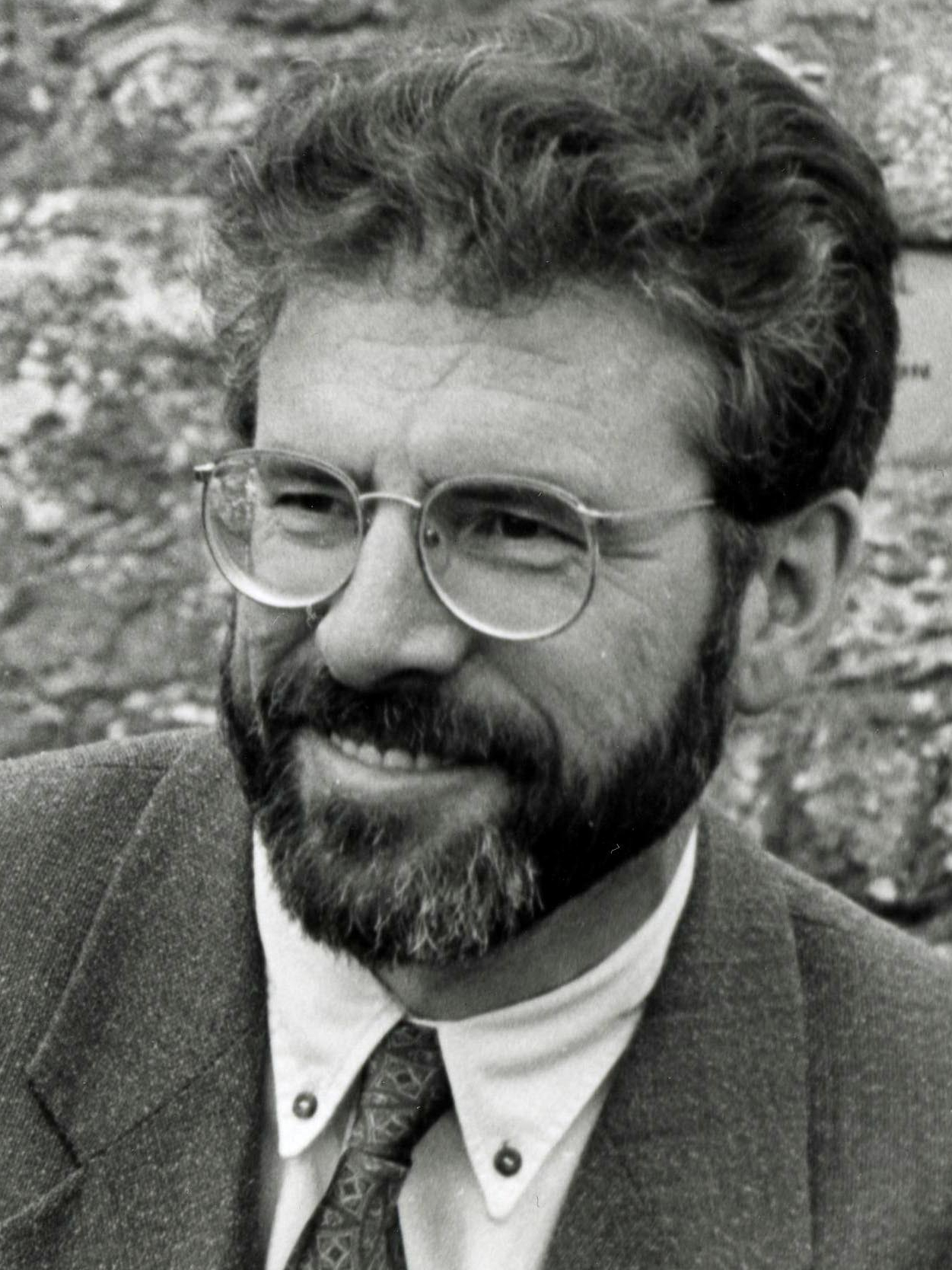
	First party	Second party	Third party
	UUP
Leader	James Molyneaux	John Hume	Ian Paisley
Party	Ulster Unionist Party	Social Democratic and Labour Party	Democratic Unionist Party
Leader since	1979	6 May 1979	1971
Leader's seat	Lagan Valley	Foyle	Antrim North
Last election	11 seats, 34.0%	1 seat, 17.9%	3 seats, 20.0%
Seats won	9	3	3
Seat change	▼2	▲2	Steady
Popular vote	276,230	154,087	85,642
Percentage	37.8%	21.1%	11.7%
Swing	▲3.8 pp	▲3.2 pp	▼8.3 pp
	Fourth party	Fifth party
		UPUP
Leader	Gerry Adams	James Kilfedder
Party	Sinn Féin	UPUP
Leader since	1983	1980
Leader's seat	Belfast West	North Down
Last election	1 seat, 13.4%	1 seat, 3.0%
Seats won	1	1
Seat change	Steady	Steady
Popular vote	83,389	18,420
Percentage	11.4%	2.5%
Swing	▼2.0 pp	▼0.5

On 11 June 1987, the 1987 United Kingdom general election was held in Northern Ireland, to elect all 650 members of the House of Commons, including the 17 Northern Ireland seats. 1,090,389 people were eligible to vote, up 40,253 from the 1983 general election. Nevertheless, the turnout was down 5.9 percentage points from the last general election.

The Conservative Party led by Margaret Thatcher as prime minister won another term in government.

== Candidates ==
Below is a table summarising the candidates of the 1987 general election in Northern Ireland.

Affiliation	Candidates
Alliance Party of Northern Ireland	16
Sinn Féin	14
Workers' Party	14
Social Democratic and Labour Party	13
Ulster Unionist Party	12
Democratic Unionist Party	4
Ulster Popular Unionist Party	1 (Note: Candidate and leader James Kilfedder in North Down.)
Northern Ireland Ecology Party	1
Protestant Unionist	1 (Note: Candidate George Seawright stood in Belfast North.)
Real Unionist	1 (Note: Candidate Roberty McCartney stood in North Down.)
Total	77

== Results ==
Party	Seats					Aggregate votes		
Party	Total	Gains	Losses	Net	Of all (%)	Total	Of all (%)	Change (%)
UUP	9	0	2	▼2	52.9	276,230	37.8	▲3.8
SDLP	3	2	0	▲2	17.6	154,087	21.1	▲3.2
DUP	3	0	0	Steady	17.6	85,642	11.7	▼8.3
Sinn Féin	1	0	0	Steady	5.9	83,389	11.4	▼2.0
Alliance	0	0	0	Steady	—	72,761	10.0	▲2.0
Workers' Party	0	0	0	Steady	—	19,294	2.6	▲0.7
UPUP	1	0	0	Steady	5.9	18,420	2.5	▼0.5
Real Unionist	0	New			—	14,467	2.0	New
Protestant Unionist	0	New			—	5,671	0.8	New
Northern Ireland Ecology	0	0	0	Steady	—	281	0.0	Steady
Blank and invalid votes						4,851	—	—
Total	17			0	100.0	730,152 (Note: All valid votes excluding spoiled votes.)	100.0	0.0
Registered voters, and turnout						1,089,160	67.0	▼5.9

Popular vote
UUP	37.8%
SDLP	21.1%
DUP	11.7%
Sinn Féin	11.4%
APNI	10.0%
Ind. Unionist	2.8%
Workers	2.6%
UPUP	2.5%
Ecology	0.0%

Parliamentary seats
UUP	52.9%
SDLP	17.6%
DUP	17.6%
Sinn Féin	5.9%
UPUP	5.9%

== MPs elected ==
Constituency	Party	MP
Antrim East	UUP	Roy Beggs
Antrim North	DUP	Ian Paisley
Antrim South	UUP	Clifford Forsythe
Belfast East	DUP	Peter Robinson
Belfast North	UUP	Cecil Walker
Belfast South	UUP	Martin Smyth
Belfast West	Sinn Féin	Gerry Adams
Down North	UPUP	Jim Kilfedder
Down South	SDLP	Eddie McGrady
Fermanagh and South Tyrone	UUP	Ken Maginnis
Foyle	SDLP	John Hume
Lagan Valley	UUP	James Molyneaux
Londonderry East	UUP	William Ross
Mid Ulster	DUP	William McCrea
Newry and Armagh	SDLP	Seamus Mallon
Strangford	UUP	John Taylor
Upper Bann	UUP	Harold McCusker

=== By-elections ===
Constituency	Date	Incumbent	Party	Winner	Party	Cause
Upper Bann	17 May 1990	Harold McCusker	UUP	David Trimble	UUP	Death

== See also ==
- 1987 United Kingdom general election in England
- 1987 United Kingdom general election in Scotland
- 1987 United Kingdom general election in Wales
