= List of United Kingdom Parliament constituencies (1983–1997) =

Constituencies in 1974–1983 | 1983 MPs | 1987 MPs | 1992 MPs | Constituencies in 1997–2001

This is a list of all constituencies that were in existence in the 1983 and 1987 General Elections. Apart from one seat (Milton Keynes, which was split into Milton Keynes South West and Milton Keynes North East) the same seats were used in the 1992 General Election.

Table of contents:

A B C D E F G H I J K L M N O P Q R S T U V W X Y Z

== A ==
Constituency	Region	Successor
Aberavon	West Glamorgan	same constituency
Aberdeen North	Grampian	same constituency
Aberdeen South	Grampian	same constituency
Aldershot	Hampshire	same constituency
Aldridge-Brownhills	West Midlands	same constituency
Altrincham and Sale	Greater Manchester	Altrincham and Sale West
Alyn and Deeside	Clwyd	same constituency
Amber Valley	Derbyshire	same constituency
Angus East	Tayside	Angus
Antrim East	Northern Ireland	same constituency
Antrim North	Northern Ireland	same constituency
Antrim South	Northern Ireland	same constituency
Argyll and Bute	Strathclyde	same constituency
Arundel	West Sussex	South west of Arundel and South Downs; West of Bognor Regis and Littlehampton
Ashfield	Nottinghamshire	same constituency
Ashford	Kent	same constituency
Ashton-under-Lyne	Greater Manchester	same constituency
Aylesbury	Buckinghamshire	same constituency
Ayr	Strathclyde	North of Ayr, Carrick and Cumnock; South of Central Ayrshire

== B ==
Constituency	Region	Successor
Banbury	Oxfordshire	
Banff and Buchan	Grampian	
Barking	Greater London	
Barnsley Central	South Yorkshire	
Barnsley East	South Yorkshire	
Barnsley West and Penistone	South Yorkshire	
Barrow and Furness	Cumbria	
Basildon	Essex	
Basingstoke	Hampshire	
Bassetlaw	Nottinghamshire	
Bath	Avon	
Batley and Spen	West Yorkshire	
Battersea	Greater London	
Beaconsfield	Buckinghamshire	
Beckenham	Greater London	
Bedfordshire Mid	Bedfordshire	
Bedfordshire North	Bedfordshire	
Bedfordshire South West	Bedfordshire	
Belfast East	Northern Ireland	
Belfast North	Northern Ireland	
Belfast South	Northern Ireland	
Belfast West	Northern Ireland	
Berkshire East	Berkshire	
Berwick-upon-Tweed	Northumberland	
Bethnal Green and Stepney	Greater London	
Beverley	Humberside	
Bexhill and Battle	East Sussex	
Bexleyheath	Greater London	
Billericay	Essex	
Birkenhead	Merseyside	
Birmingham Edgbaston	West Midlands	
Birmingham Erdington	West Midlands	
Birmingham Hall Green	West Midlands	
Birmingham Hodge Hill	West Midlands	
Birmingham Ladywood	West Midlands	
Birmingham Northfield	West Midlands	
Birmingham Perry Barr	West Midlands	
Birmingham Selly Oak	West Midlands	
Birmingham Small Heath	West Midlands	
Birmingham Sparkbrook	West Midlands	
Birmingham Yardley	West Midlands	
Bishop Auckland	County Durham	
Blaby	Leicestershire	
Blackburn	Lancashire	
Blackpool North	Lancashire	
Blackpool South	Lancashire	
Blaenau Gwent	Gwent	
Blaydon	Tyne and Wear	
Blyth Valley	Northumberland	
Bolsover	Derbyshire	
Bolton North East	Greater Manchester	
Bolton South East	Greater Manchester	
Bolton West	Greater Manchester	
Boothferry	Humberside	
Bootle	Merseyside	
Bosworth	Leicestershire	
Bournemouth East	Dorset	
Bournemouth West	Dorset	
Bow and Poplar	Greater London	
Bradford North	West Yorkshire	
Bradford South	West Yorkshire	
Bradford West	West Yorkshire	
Braintree	Essex	
Brecon and Radnor	Powys	
Brent East	Greater London	
Brent North	Greater London	
Brent South	Greater London	
Brentford and Isleworth	Greater London	
Brentwood and Ongar	Essex	
Bridgend	Mid Glamorgan	
Bridgwater	Somerset	
Bridlington	Humberside	
Brigg and Cleethorpes	Humberside	
Brighton Kemptown	East Sussex	
Brighton Pavilion	East Sussex	
Bristol East	Avon	
Bristol North West	Avon	
Bristol South	Avon	
Bristol West	Avon	
Bromsgrove	Hereford and Worcester	
Broxbourne	Hertfordshire	
Broxtowe	Nottinghamshire	
Buckingham	Buckinghamshire	
Burnley	Lancashire	
Burton	Staffordshire	
Bury North	Greater Manchester	
Bury South	Greater Manchester	
Bury St Edmunds	Suffolk	

== C ==
Constituency	Region
Caernarfon	Gwynedd
Caerphilly	Mid Glamorgan
Caithness and Sutherland	Highland
Calder Valley	West Yorkshire
Cambridge	Cambridgeshire
Cambridgeshire North East	Cambridgeshire
Cambridgeshire South East	Cambridgeshire
Cambridgeshire South West	Cambridgeshire
Cannock and Burntwood	Staffordshire
Canterbury	Kent
Cardiff Central	South Glamorgan
Cardiff North	South Glamorgan
Cardiff South and Penarth	South Glamorgan
Cardiff West	South Glamorgan
Carlisle	Cumbria
Carmarthen	Dyfed
Carrick, Cumnock and Doon Valley	Strathclyde
Carshalton and Wallington	Greater London
Castle Point	Essex
Ceredigion and Pembroke North	Dyfed
Cheadle	Greater Manchester
Chelmsford	Essex
Chelsea	Greater London
Cheltenham	Gloucestershire
Chertsey and Walton	Surrey
Chesham and Amersham	Buckinghamshire
Chester	Cheshire
Chesterfield	Derbyshire
Chichester	West Sussex
Chingford	Greater London
Chipping Barnet	Greater London
Chislehurst	Greater London
Chorley	Lancashire
Christchurch	Dorset
Cirencester and Tewkesbury	Gloucestershire
City of London and Westminster South	Greater London
Clackmannan	Central Scotland
Clwyd North West	Clwyd
Clwyd South West	Clwyd
Clydebank and Milngavie	Strathclyde
Clydesdale	Strathclyde
Colchester North	Essex
Colchester South and Maldon	Essex
Colne Valley	West Yorkshire
Congleton	Cheshire
Conwy	Gwynedd
Copeland	Cumbria
Corby	Northamptonshire
Cornwall North	Cornwall
Cornwall South East	Cornwall
Coventry North East	West Midlands
Coventry North West	West Midlands
Coventry South East	West Midlands
Coventry South West	West Midlands
Crawley	West Sussex
Crewe and Nantwich	Cheshire
Crosby	Merseyside
Croydon Central	Greater London
Croydon North East	Greater London
Croydon North West	Greater London
Croydon South	Greater London
Cumbernauld and Kilsyth	Strathclyde
Cunninghame North	Strathclyde
Cunninghame South	Strathclyde
Cynon Valley	Mid Glamorgan

== D ==
Constituency	Region
Dagenham	Greater London
Darlington	County Durham
Dartford	Kent
Daventry	Northamptonshire
Davyhulme	Greater Manchester
Delyn	Clwyd
Denton and Reddish	Greater Manchester
Derby North	Derbyshire
Derby South	Derbyshire
Derbyshire North East	Derbyshire
Derbyshire South	Derbyshire
Derbyshire West	Derbyshire
Devizes	Wiltshire
Devon North	Devon
Devon West and Torridge	Devon
Dewsbury	West Yorkshire
Doncaster Central	South Yorkshire
Doncaster North	South Yorkshire
Don Valley	South Yorkshire
Dorset North	Dorset
Dorset South	Dorset
Dorset West	Dorset
Dover	Kent
Down North	Northern Ireland
Down South	Northern Ireland
Dudley East	West Midlands
Dudley West	West Midlands
Dulwich	Greater London
Dumbarton	Dumbarton
Dumfries	Dumfries and Galloway
Dundee East	Tayside
Dundee West	Tayside
Dunfermline East	Fife
Dunfermline West	Fife
Durham	County Durham
Durham North	County Durham
Durham North West	County Durham

== E ==
Constituency	Region
Ealing Acton	Greater London
Ealing North	Greater London
Ealing Southall	Greater London
Easington	Durham
Eastbourne	East Sussex
East Kilbride	Strathclyde
Eastleigh	Hampshire
East Lothian	Lothian
Eastwood	Strathclyde
Eccles	Greater Manchester
Eddisbury	Cheshire
Edinburgh Central	Lothian
Edinburgh East	Lothian
Edinburgh Leith	Lothian
Edinburgh Pentlands	Lothian
Edinburgh South	Lothian
Edinburgh West	Lothian
Edmonton	Greater London
Ellesmere Port and Neston	Cheshire
Elmet	West Yorkshire
Eltham	Greater London
Enfield North	Greater London
Enfield Southgate	Greater London
Epping Forest	Essex
Epsom and Ewell	Surrey
Erewash	Derbyshire
Erith and Crayford	Greater London
Esher	Surrey
Exeter	Devon

== F ==
Constituency	Region
Falkirk East	Central Scotland
Falkirk West	Central Scotland
Falmouth and Camborne	Cornwall
Fareham	Hampshire
Faversham	Kent
Feltham and Heston	Greater London
Fermanagh and South Tyrone	Northern Ireland
Fife Central	Fife
Fife North East	Fife
Finchley	Greater London
Folkestone and Hythe	Kent
Foyle	Northern Ireland
Fulham	Greater London
Fylde	Lancashire

== G ==
Constituency	Region
Gainsborough and Horncastle	Lincolnshire
Galloway and Upper Nithsdale	Dumfries and Galloway
Gateshead East	Tyne and Wear
Gedling	Nottinghamshire
Gillingham	Kent
Glanford and Scunthorpe	Humberside
Glasgow Cathcart	Strathclyde
Glasgow Central	Strathclyde
Glasgow Garscadden	Strathclyde
Glasgow Govan	Strathclyde
Glasgow Hillhead	Strathclyde
Glasgow Maryhill	Strathclyde
Glasgow Pollok	Strathclyde
Glasgow Provan	Strathclyde
Glasgow Rutherglen	Strathclyde
Glasgow Shettleston	Strathclyde
Glasgow Springburn	Strathclyde
Gloucester	Gloucestershire
Gloucestershire West	Gloucestershire
Gordon	Grampian
Gosport	Hampshire
Gower	West Glamorgan
Grantham	Lincolnshire
Gravesham	Kent
Great Grimsby	Humberside
Great Yarmouth	Norfolk
Greenock and Port Glasgow	Strathclyde
Greenwich	Greater London
Guildford	Surrey

== H ==
Constituency	Region
Hackney North and Stoke Newington	Greater London
Hackney South and Shoreditch	Greater London
Halesowen and Stourbridge	West Midlands
Halifax	West Yorkshire
Halton	Cheshire
Hamilton	Strathclyde
Hammersmith	Greater London
Hampshire East	Hampshire
Hampshire North West	Hampshire
Hampstead and Highgate	Greater London
Harborough	Leicestershire
Harlow	Essex
Harrogate	North Yorkshire
Harrow East	Greater London
Harrow West	Greater London
Hartlepool	Cleveland
Harwich	Essex
Hastings and Rye	East Sussex
Havant	Hampshire
Hayes and Harlington	Greater London
Hazel Grove	Greater Manchester
Hemsworth	West Yorkshire
Hendon North	Greater London
Hendon South	Greater London
Henley	Oxfordshire
Hereford	Hereford and Worcester
Hertford and Stortford	Hertfordshire
Hertfordshire North	Hertfordshire
Hertfordshire South West	Hertfordshire
Hertfordshire West	Hertfordshire
Hertsmere	Hertfordshire
Hexham	Northumberland
Heywood and Middleton	Greater Manchester
High Peak	Derbyshire
Holborn and St Pancras South	Greater London
Holland and Boston	Lincolnshire
Honiton	Devon
Hornchurch	Greater London
Hornsey and Wood Green	Greater London
Horsham	West Sussex
Houghton and Washington	Tyne and Wear
Hove	East Sussex
Huddersfield	West Yorkshire
Huntingdon	Cambridgeshire
Hyndburn	Lancashire

== I ==
Constituency	Region
Ilford North	Greater London
Ilford South	Greater London
Inverness, Nairn and Lochaber	Highland
Ipswich	Suffolk
Isle of Wight	Isle of Wight
Islington North	Greater London
Islington South and Finsbury	Greater London
Islwyn	Gwent

== J ==
Constituency	Region
Jarrow	Tyne and Wear

== K ==
Constituency	Region
Keighley	West Yorkshire
Kensington	Greater London
Kent Mid	Kent
Kettering	Northamptonshire
Kilmarnock and Loudon	Strathclyde
Kincardine and Deeside	Grampian
Kingston upon Hull East	Humberside
Kingston upon Hull North	Humberside
Kingston upon Hull West	Humberside
Kingston-upon-Thames	Greater London
Kingswood	Avon
Kirkcaldy	Fife
Knowsley North	Merseyside
Knowsley South	Merseyside

== L ==
Constituency	Region
Lagan Valley	Northern Ireland
Lancashire West	Lancashire
Lancaster	Lancashire
Langbaurgh	Cleveland
Leeds Central	West Yorkshire
Leeds East	West Yorkshire
Leeds North East	West Yorkshire
Leeds North West	West Yorkshire
Leeds South and Morley	West Yorkshire
Leeds West	West Yorkshire
Leicester East	Leicestershire
Leicester South	Leicestershire
Leicester West	Leicestershire
Leicestershire North West	Leicestershire
Leigh	Greater Manchester
Leominster	Hereford and Worcester
Lewes	East Sussex
Lewisham Deptford	Greater London
Lewisham East	Greater London
Lewisham West	Greater London
Leyton	Greater London
Lincoln	Lincolnshire
Lindsey East	Lincolnshire
Linlithgow	Lothian
Littleborough and Saddleworth	Greater Manchester
Liverpool Broadgreen	Merseyside
Liverpool Garston	Merseyside
Liverpool Mossley Hill	Merseyside
Liverpool Riverside	Merseyside
Liverpool Walton	Merseyside
Liverpool West Derby	Merseyside
Livingston	Lothian
Llanelli	Dyfed
Londonderry East	Northern Ireland
Loughborough	Leicestershire
Ludlow	Shropshire
Luton North	Bedfordshire
Luton South	Bedfordshire

== M ==
Constituency	Region
Macclesfield	Cheshire
Maidstone	Kent
Makerfield	Greater Manchester
Manchester Blackley	Greater Manchester
Manchester Central	Greater Manchester
Manchester Gorton	Greater Manchester
Manchester Withington	Greater Manchester
Manchester Wythenshawe	Greater Manchester
Mansfield	Nottinghamshire
Medway	Kent
Meirionnydd Nant Conwy	Gwynedd
Meriden	West Midlands
Merthyr Tydfil and Rhymney	Mid Glamorgan
Middlesbrough	Cleveland
Midlothian	Lothian
Milton Keynes	Buckinghamshire
Mitcham and Morden	Greater London
Mole Valley	Surrey
Monklands East	Strathclyde
Monklands West	Strathclyde
Monmouth	Gwent
Montgomery	Powys
Moray	Grampian
Morecambe and Lunesdale	Lancashire
Motherwell North	Strathclyde
Motherwell South	Strathclyde

== N ==
Constituency	Region
Neath	West Glamorgan
Newark	Nottinghamshire
Newbury	Berkshire
Newcastle-under-Lyme	Staffordshire
Newcastle upon Tyne Central	Tyne and Wear
Newcastle upon Tyne East	Tyne and Wear
Newcastle upon Tyne North	Tyne and Wear
New Forest	Hampshire
Newham North East	Greater London
Newham North West	Greater London
Newham South	Greater London
Newport East	Gwent
Newport West	Gwent
Newry and Armagh	Northern Ireland
Norfolk Mid	Norfolk
Norfolk North	Norfolk
Norfolk North West	Norfolk
Norfolk South	Norfolk
Norfolk South West	Norfolk
Normanton	West Yorkshire
Northampton North	Northamptonshire
Northampton South	Northamptonshire
Northavon	Avon
Norwich North	Norfolk
Norwich South	Norfolk
Norwood	Greater London
Nottingham East	Nottinghamshire
Nottingham North	Nottinghamshire
Nottingham South	Nottinghamshire
Nuneaton	Warwickshire

== O ==
Constituency	Region
Ogmore	Mid Glamorgan
Old Bexley and Sidcup	Greater London
Oldham Central and Royton	Greater Manchester
Oldham West	Greater Manchester
Orkney and Shetland	Orkney and Shetland
Orpington	Greater London
Oxford East	Oxfordshire
Oxford West and Abingdon	Oxfordshire

== P ==
Constituency	Region
Paisley North	Strathclyde
Paisley South	Strathclyde
Peckham	Greater London
Pembroke	Dyfed
Pendle	Lancashire
Penrith and the Border	Cumbria
Perth and Kinross	Tayside
Peterborough	Cambridgeshire
Plymouth Devonport	Devon
Plymouth Drake	Devon
Plymouth Sutton	Devon
Pontefract and Castleford	West Yorkshire
Pontypridd	Mid Glamorgan
Poole	Dorset
Portsmouth North	Hampshire
Portsmouth South	Hampshire
Preston	Lancashire
Pudsey	West Yorkshire
Putney	Greater London

== R ==
Constituency	Region
Ravensbourne	Greater London
Reading East	Berkshire
Reading West	Berkshire
Redcar	Cleveland
Reigate	Surrey
Renfrew West and Inverclyde	Strathclyde
Rhondda	Mid Glamorgan
Ribble Valley	Lancashire
Richmond and Barnes	Greater London
Richmond (Yorks)	North Yorkshire
Rochdale	Greater Manchester
Rochford	Essex
Romford	Greater London
Romsey and Waterside	Hampshire
Ross, Cromarty and Skye	Highland
Rossendale and Darwen	Lancashire
Rotherham	South Yorkshire
Rother Valley	South Yorkshire
Roxburgh and Berwickshire	Scottish Borders
Rugby and Kenilworth	Warwickshire
Ruislip Northwood	Greater London
Rushcliffe	Nottinghamshire
Rutland and Melton	Leicestershire
Ryedale	North Yorkshire

== S ==
Constituency	Region
Saffron Walden	Essex
St Albans	Hertfordshire
St Helens North	Merseyside
St Helens South	Merseyside
St Ives	Cornwall
Salford East	Greater Manchester
Salisbury	Wiltshire
Scarborough	North Yorkshire
Sedgefield	County Durham
Selby	North Yorkshire
Sevenoaks	Kent
Sheffield Attercliffe	South Yorkshire
Sheffield Brightside	South Yorkshire
Sheffield Central	South Yorkshire
Sheffield Hallam	South Yorkshire
Sheffield Heeley	South Yorkshire
Sheffield Hillsborough	South Yorkshire
Sherwood	Nottinghamshire
Shipley	West Yorkshire
Shoreham	West Sussex
Shrewsbury and Atcham	Shropshire
Shropshire North	Shropshire
Skipton and Ripon	North Yorkshire
Slough	Berkshire
Solihull	West Midlands
Somerton and Frome	Somerset
Southampton Itchen	Hampshire
Southampton Test	Hampshire
Southend East	Essex
Southend West	Essex
South Hams	Devon
Southport	Merseyside
South Ribble	Lancashire
South Shields	Tyne and Wear
Southwark and Bermondsey	Greater London
Spelthorne	Surrey
Stafford	Staffordshire
Staffordshire Mid	Staffordshire
Staffordshire Moorlands	Staffordshire
Staffordshire South	Staffordshire
Staffordshire South East	Staffordshire
Stalybridge and Hyde	Greater Manchester
Stamford and Spalding	Lincolnshire
Stevenage	Hertfordshire
Stirling	Central Scotland
Stockport	Greater Manchester
Stockton North	Cleveland
Stockton South	Cleveland
Stoke-on-Trent Central	Staffordshire
Stoke-on-Trent North	Staffordshire
Stoke-on-Trent South	Staffordshire
Strangford	Northern Ireland
Stratford-upon-Avon	Warwickshire
Strathkelvin and Bearsden	Strathclyde
Streatham	Greater London
Stretford	Greater Manchester
Stroud	Gloucestershire
Suffolk Central	Suffolk
Suffolk Coastal	Suffolk
Suffolk South	Suffolk
Sunderland North	Tyne and Wear
Sunderland South	Tyne and Wear
Surbiton	Greater London
Surrey East	Surrey
Surrey North West	Surrey
Surrey South West	Surrey
Sussex Mid	West Sussex
Sutton and Cheam	Greater London
Sutton Coldfield	West Midlands
Swansea East	West Glamorgan
Swansea West	West Glamorgan
Swindon	Wiltshire

== T ==
Constituency	Region
Tatton	Cheshire
Taunton	Somerset
Tayside North	Tayside
Teignbridge	Devon
Thanet, North	Kent
Thanet, South	Kent
Thurrock	Essex
Tiverton	Devon
Tonbridge and Malling	Kent
Tooting	Greater London
Torbay	Devon
Torfaen	Gwent
Tottenham	Greater London
Truro	Cornwall
Tunbridge Wells	Kent
Tweeddale Ettrick and Lauderdale	Scottish Borders
Twickenham	Greater London
Tyne Bridge	Tyne and Wear
Tynemouth	Tyne and Wear

== U ==
Constituency	Region
Mid Ulster	Northern Ireland
Upminster	Greater London
Upper Bann	Northern Ireland
Uxbridge	Greater London

== V ==
Constituency	Region
Vale of Glamorgan	South Glamorgan
Vauxhall	Greater London

== W ==
Constituency	Region
Wakefield	West Yorkshire
Wallasey	Merseyside
Wallsend	Tyne and Wear
Walsall North	West Midlands
Walsall South	West Midlands
Walthamstow	Greater London
Wansbeck	Northumberland
Wansdyke	Avon
Wanstead and Woodford	Greater London
Wantage	Oxfordshire
Warley East	West Midlands
Warley West	West Midlands
Warrington North	Cheshire
Warrington South	Cheshire
Warwick and Leamington	Warwickshire
Warwickshire North	Warwickshire
Watford	Hertfordshire
Waveney	Suffolk
Wealden	East Sussex
Wellingborough	Northamptonshire
Wells	Somerset
Welwyn Hatfield	Hertfordshire
Wentworth	South Yorkshire
West Bromwich East	West Midlands
West Bromwich West	West Midlands
Westbury	Wiltshire
Western Isles	Western Isles
Westminster North	Greater London
Westmorland and Lonsdale	Cumbria
Weston-super-Mare	Avon
Wigan	Greater Manchester
Wiltshire North	Wiltshire
Wimbledon	Greater London
Winchester	Hampshire
Windsor and Maidenhead	Berkshire
Wirral South	Merseyside
Wirral West	Merseyside
Witney	Oxfordshire
Woking	Surrey
Wokingham	Berkshire
Wolverhampton North East	West Midlands
Wolverhampton South East	West Midlands
Wolverhampton South West	West Midlands
Woodspring	Avon
Woolwich	Greater London
Worcester	Hereford and Worcester
Worcestershire Mid	Hereford and Worcester
Worcestershire South	Hereford and Worcester
Workington	Cumbria
Worsley	Greater Manchester
Worthing	West Sussex
The Wrekin	Shropshire
Wrexham	Clwyd
Wycombe	Buckinghamshire
Wyre	Lancashire
Wyre Forest	Hereford and Worcester

== Y ==
Constituency	Region
Yeovil	Somerset
Ynys Môn	Gwynedd
York	North Yorkshire

Note: All regions used are those in force when the constituencies were created.
