= Stautzenberger College =

Private junior college in Maumee, and Brecksville, Ohio, US

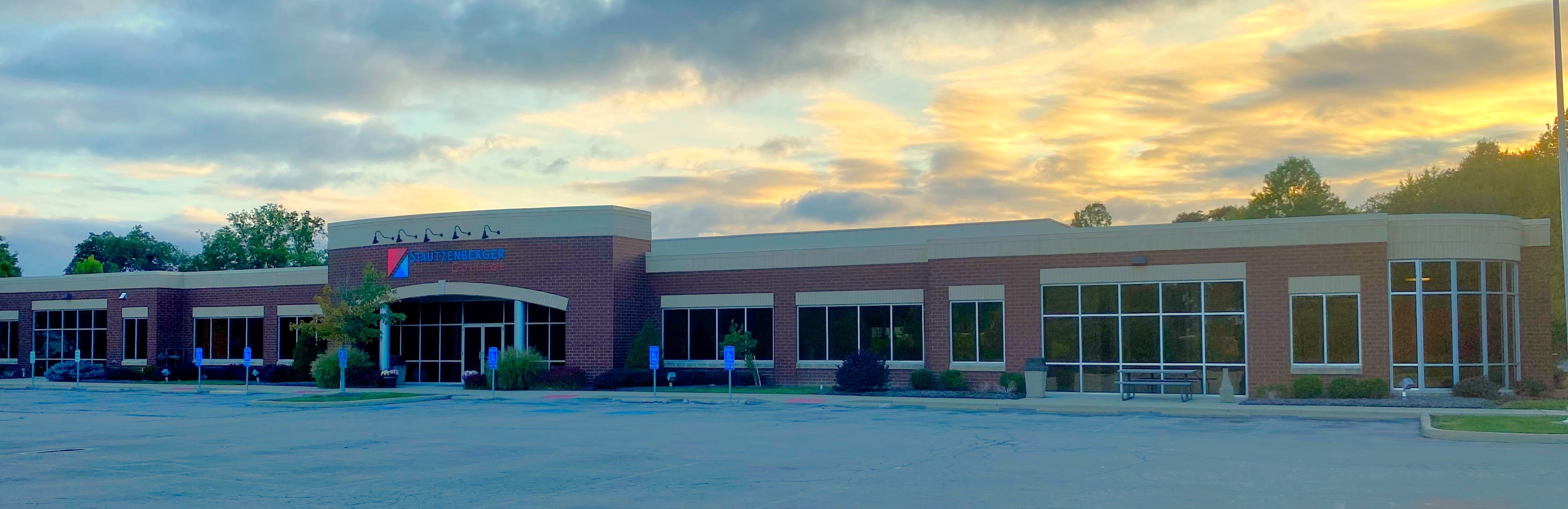
- Brecksville Campus
- Type: Private for-profit junior college
- Established: 1926
- President: Amy Beauregard (Maumee Campus) and Lynn Mizanin (Brecksville Campus)
- Undergraduates: 695
- Location: Maumee and Brecksville, Ohio, United States; 41°34′58″N 83°40′59″W
- Website: sctoday.edu

Stautzenberger College is a private for-profit junior college in Maumee, and Brecksville, Ohio. It is a part of American Higher Education Development Corporation.

== Academics ==
Programs are offered in two ways. The first is to take the core classes during a 10-month program, which usually requires hands-on training, and receive a diploma in a particular field. Those wishing to pursue an associate degree continue taking online courses. The second option is to complete an associate degree program in 21 months.
