= 1987 Houston mayoral election =

- November 3, 1987
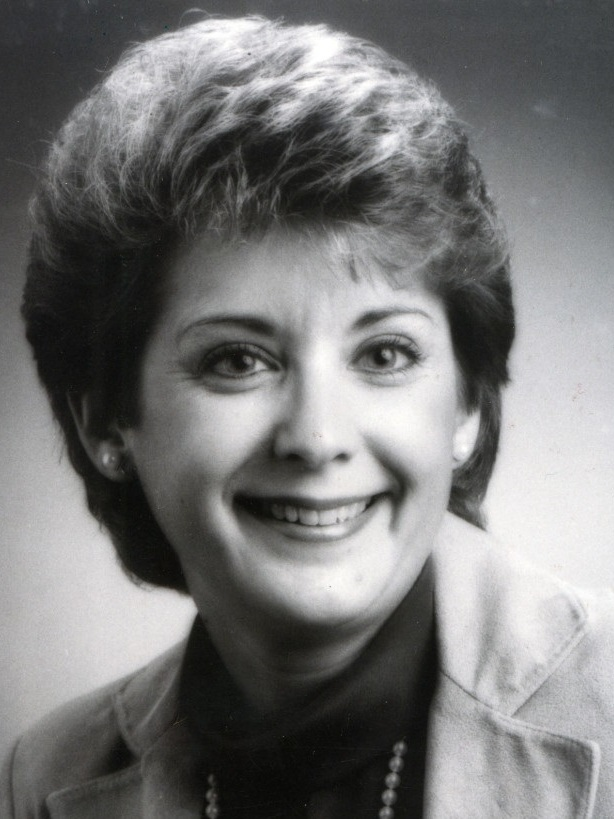

Nominee	Kathy Whitmire	Bill Anderson	Dick Dimond
Popular vote	168,656	27,254	13,628
Percentage	74%	12%	6%
Mayor before election
Kathy Whitmire
Elected mayor
Kathy Whitmire

The 1987 Houston mayoral election took place on November 3, 1987. Incumbent Mayor Kathy Whitmire was re-elected to a fourth term.

== History ==
Whitmire, first elected in 1981 partly through a political alliance with the Houston LGTBQ community, partly retreated from this alliance after a political loss in 1985 on some civil rights and equal-employment charter amendment referendums. A local opposition group organized as a Straight Slate of Candidates in 1985. Although none of these candidates won in 1985, the 1987 election revisited LGTBQ as political battle line. Thus, an important political objective for the 1987 Mayoral Elections was mending this rift with local interest groups, such as the Gay Political Caucus.

In other races, George Greanias resigned his Houston city council seat to run for Houston City Controller. He gained election with 62% of the vote, despite being a frequent critic of popular Mayor Kathy Whitmire. Receiving the second most votes was Jamie G. House, previously the assistant to outgoing City Controller, Lance Lalor.

== Candidates ==
- Incumbent Mayor Kathy Whitmire, 73%
- Bill Anderson, 12%
- Dick Dimond, 6%
- Glenn Arnett
- Mary Pritchard
- Shelby Oringderff
- Don Geil

== Results ==
Houston mayoral election, 1987
Candidate	Votes	%
Kathy Whitmire (incumbent)	168,656	74%
Bill Anderson	27,254	12%
Dick Dimond	13,628	6%
Glen Arnett	6,977	3%
Mary Pritchard	5,926	2%
Shelby Oringderff	4,853	2%
Don Geil	2,807	1%
