= 1987 Louisiana lieutenant gubernatorial election =

- October 24, 1987 (first round); November 21, 1987 (runoff)

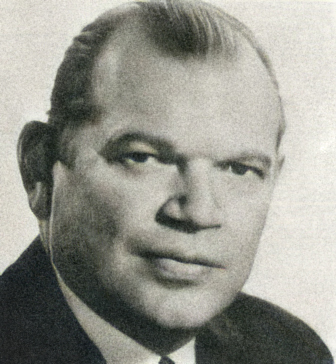

Candidate	Paul Hardy	Robert Louis Freeman Sr.
Party	Republican	Democratic
First round	429,906; 29.35%	586,335; 40.03%
Runoff	521,992; 53.15%	460,199; 46.85%
Candidate	Bill Dodd	Patricia Norton
Party	Democratic	Democratic
First round	242,519; 16.56%	161,231; 11.00%
Runoff	Eliminated	Eliminated
- Parish results Hardy: 50–60% 60–70% Freeman: 50–60% 60–70% 70–80%
Lieutenant Governor before election
Robert Louis Freeman Sr.
Democratic
Elected Lieutenant Governor
Paul Hardy
Republican

The 1987 Louisiana lieutenant gubernatorial election was held on November 21, 1987, in order to elect the lieutenant governor of Louisiana. Former Republican Secretary of State of Louisiana Paul Hardy defeated incumbent Democratic lieutenant governor Robert Louis Freeman Sr. in the Runoff election, thereby becoming the first Republican to have been elected lieutenant governor of the U.S. state of Louisiana since Reconstruction.

== Background ==
Elections in Louisiana—with the exception of U.S. presidential elections—follow a variation of the open primary system called the jungle primary or the nonpartisan blanket primary. Candidates of any and all parties are listed on one ballot; voters need not limit themselves to the candidates of one party. Unless one candidate takes more than 50% of the vote in the first round, a run-off election is then held between the top two candidates, who may in fact be members of the same party. Texas uses this same format for its special elections. In this election, the first round of voting was held on October 24, 1987. The runoff was held on November 21, 1987.

== Primary election ==
On election day, October 24, 1987, incumbent Democratic lieutenant governor Robert Louis Freeman Sr. and former Republican Secretary of State of Louisiana Paul Hardy received the most votes and thus advanced to a runoff election on November 21.

=== Results ===
Louisiana lieutenant gubernatorial primary election, 1987
Party	Candidate	Votes	%
Democratic	Robert Louis Freeman Sr. (incumbent)	586,335	40.03
Republican	Paul Hardy	429,906	29.35
Democratic	Bill Dodd	242,519	16.56
Democratic	Patricia Norton	161,231	11.00
Democratic	Royce J. Guillory	24,905	1.70
Democratic	Budd Olister	19,944	1.36
Total votes		1,464,840	100.00

== Runoff election ==
On election day, November 21, 1987, former Republican Secretary of State of Louisiana Paul Hardy defeated incumbent Democratic lieutenant governor Robert Louis Freeman Sr. by a margin of 61,793 votes, thereby gaining Republican control over the office of lieutenant governor for the first time since reconstruction. Hardy was sworn in as the 48th Lieutenant Governor of Louisiana on March 14, 1988.

=== Results ===
Louisiana lieutenant gubernatorial runoff election, 1987
Party	Candidate	Votes	%
Republican	Paul Hardy	521,992	53.15
Democratic	Robert Louis Freeman Sr. (incumbent)	460,199	46.85
Total votes		982,191	100.00
Republican gain from Democratic			
