= 1987 Tampa mayoral election =

- March 3, 1987
Candidate	Sandra Freedman	Charles G. Spicola, Jr.	Helen Chavez
Party	Nonpartisan	Nonpartisan	Nonpartisan
Popular vote	32,743	8,956	6,561
Percentage	65.54%	17.93%	13.13%
Mayor before election
Sandra Freedman
Nonpartisan
Elected mayor
Sandra Freedman
Nonpartisan

The 1987 Tampa mayoral election took place on March 3, 1987. Incumbent Mayor Sandra Freedman ran for election to a full term. Freedman became mayor on July 16, 1986, when Mayor Bob Martinez resigned from office to run for governor. Prior to Martinez's resignation, Freedman had already announced that she would run to succeed him, and raised a significant amount of money.

Freedman originally faced a crowded field of competitors, including investment banker Bruce Samson and City Councilmember Helen Chavez. However, shortly after Freedman became mayor, Samson dropped out of the race to become president of the University of Tampa. Chavez emerged as Freedman's main competitor, but shortly before the filing deadline, Councilmember Charles Spicola also announced that he would run. Freedman ended up winning in a landslide, receiving 66 percent of the vote to Specula's 18 percent and Chavez's 13 percent.

== Candidates ==
- Helen Chavez, city councilmember
- Faye Culp, civic leader, 1986 Republican County Commission candidate
- Sandra Freedman, incumbent mayor
- Charles G. Spicola, Jr., former city councilmember
- Eric J. Walloga, stockbroker

== Results ==
1987 Tampa mayoral election
Party	Candidate	Votes	%
Nonpartisan	Sandra Freedman (inc.)	32,743	65.54%
Nonpartisan	Charles G. Spicola, Jr.	8,956	17.93%
Nonpartisan	Helen Chavez	6,561	13.13%
Nonpartisan	Faye Culp	1,166	2.33%
Nonpartisan	Eric J. Walloga	534	1.07%
Total votes		49,960	100.00%
