= Red Front (UK) =

Red Front was a socialist electoral coalition in the United Kingdom which stood fourteen candidates in the 1987 general election.

Its main component was the Revolutionary Communist Party of Frank Furedi, while it also attracted the support of the tiny Revolutionary Democratic Group, Red Action and a few independents. The RCP was hugely optimistic about its potential and spoke of it in time replacing the Labour Party as the main left wing force in British politics. However, Red Front candidates shared only 3,177 votes in total and as a result it was abandoned shortly after the election.

== Election results ==
General election 11 June 1987

Constituency	Candidate	Votes	%	Position
Birmingham Sparkbrook	Pervaiz Khan	229	0.7	5
Bristol South	Carol Margaret Meghji	149	0.3	5
Glasgow Central	Derek Owen	126	0.4	7
Hackney North and Stoke Newington	Yasmini Train Anwar	228	0.6	5
Hammersmith	P. John Francis Fitzpatrick	125	0.4	5
Holborn and St. Pancras	Michael James Gavan	300	0.7	4
Knowsley North	David Hallsworth	538	1.4	4
Manchester Gorton	Miss Pam Lawrence	253	0.6	4
Manchester Wythenshawe	Miss Susan Connelly	216	0.5	4
Newcastle upon Tyne Central	Kirk Williams	111	0.2	5
Nottingham East	Kenan Malik	212	0.5	4
Pontefract and Castleford	Daniel McFarlane Lees	295	0.6	4
Sheffield Central	Ceri Teresa Dingle	278	0.7	4
Vauxhall	Kunle Oluremi	117	0.3	6

== Bibliography ==
- Revolutionary Communist Party (1 February 1987). The Red Front: A Platform for Working Class Unity. London: Junius Publications. ISBN 978-0948392061.
- Smith, Evan (21 November 2022). "A Platform for Working Class Unity? The Revolutionary Communist Party's The Red Front and the pre-history of Living Marxism/Spiked Online in the 1980s". Contemporary British History. 37. Informa UK Limited: 89–127. doi:10.1080/13619462.2022.2142780. ISSN 1361-9462. S2CID 253791729.
