= 1976 Liberal Party leadership election =

- 7 July 1976
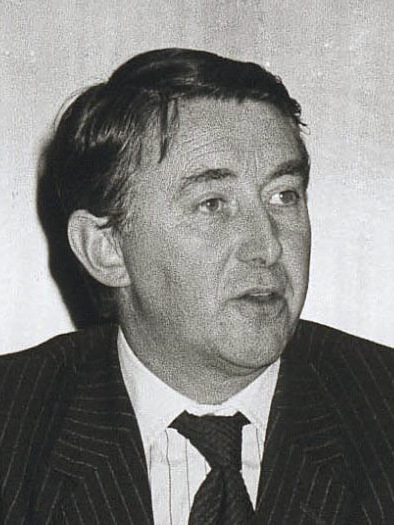

| Candidate | David Steel | John Pardoe |
| Popular vote | 12,541 | 7,032 |
| Percentage | 64.1% | 35.9% |
Leader before election
Jeremy Thorpe
Elected Leader
David Steel

The 1976 Liberal Party leadership election was called following the resignation of Jeremy Thorpe in the wake of allegations which would eventually lead to Thorpe's trial and acquittal for conspiracy to murder in 1979.

== Background ==
There were two candidates, David Steel and John Pardoe, who were elected by a ballot of an electoral college made up of representatives of the various constituency associations, with their vote "weighted" by the strength of the Liberal vote at the previous general election. This electoral system was devised by Michael Steed, and this election proved to be the only time it was ever used to elect a Liberal leader.

The election was won by David Steel, who served as leader of the Liberal Party until merger with the Social Democratic Party (SDP) in 1988, forming the Liberal Democrats. David Steel later served as interim leader of the Liberal Democrats (jointly with Bob Maclennan of the SDP) for the duration of the 1988 leadership election which eventually elected Paddy Ashdown as the new party's first permanent leader.

== Results ==
| Candidate | Votes | % |
|---|---|---|
| David Steel | 12,541 | 64.1 |
| John Pardoe | 7,032 | 35.9 |
