= List of MPs for constituencies in Scotland (1979–1983) =

- Colours on map indicate the party allegiance of each constituency's MP.

This is a list of the 71 Members of Parliament (MPs) elected to the House of Commons of the United Kingdom by Scottish constituencies for the Forty-eighth parliament of the United Kingdom (1979 to 1983) at the 1979 general election.

== Composition at election ==
Affiliation	Members
Labour Party	44
Conservative Party	22
Liberal	3
Scottish National Party	2
Total	71

== Composition at dissolution ==
Affiliation	Members
Labour Party	44
Conservative Party	20
Alliance	6
Scottish National Party	2
Total	71

== List ==
Constituency	MP	Party	Notes
Aberdeen North	Robert Hughes	Labour	
Aberdeen South	Ian Sproat	Conservative	
Argyll	John Mackay	Conservative	
Ayr	George Younger	Conservative	
Banffshire	David Myles	Conservative	
Berwick and East Lothian	John Home Robertson	Labour	
Bothwell	James Hamilton	Labour	
Bute and North Ayrshire	John Corrie	Conservative	
Caithness and Sutherland	Robert Maclennan	Labour	SDP/Alliance 1981-
Central Ayrshire	David Lambie	Labour	
Central Dunbartonshire	Hugh McCartney	Labour	
Central Fife	Willie Hamilton	Labour	
Clackmannan and East Stirlingshire	Martin O'Neill	Labour	
Coatbridge and Airdrie	James Dempsey	Labour	1982 By-election
Dumfriesshire	Sir Hector Munro	Conservative	
Dundee East	Gordon Wilson	SNP	
Dundee West	Ernie Ross	Labour	
Dunfermline	Dick Douglas	Labour Co-operative	
East Aberdeenshire	Albert McQuarrie	Conservative	
East Dunbartonshire	Norman Hogg	Labour	
East Fife	Barry Henderson	Conservative	
East Kilbride	Maurice Miller	Labour	
East Renfrewshire	Allen Stewart	Conservative	
Edinburgh Central	Robin Cook	Labour	
Edinburgh East	Gavin Strang	Labour	
Edinburgh Leith	Ron Brown	Labour	
Edinburgh North	Alex Fletcher	Conservative	
Edinburgh Pentlands	Malcolm Rifkind	Conservative	
Edinburgh South	Michael Ancram	Conservative	
Edinburgh West	James Douglas-Hamilton	Conservative	
Galloway	Ian Lang	Conservative	
Glasgow Cathcart	John Maxton	Labour	
Glasgow Central	Thomas McMillan	Labour	1980 By-election
Glasgow Craigton	Bruce Millan	Labour	
Glasgow Garscadden	Donald Dewar	Labour	
Glasgow Govan	Andy McMahon	Labour	
Glasgow Hillhead	Tam Galbraith	Conservative	1982 By-election
Glasgow Kelvingrove	Neil Carmichael	Labour	
Glasgow Maryhill	Jim Craigen	Labour Co-operative	
Glasgow Pollok	James White	Labour	
Glasgow Provan	Hugh Brown	Labour	
Glasgow Queen's Park	Frank McElhone	Labour	1982 By-election
Glasgow Shettleston	David Marshall	Labour	
Glasgow Springburn	Michael Martin	Labour	
Greenock and Port Glasgow	Dickson Mabon	Labour	SDP/Alliance 1981-
Hamilton	George Robertson	Labour	
Inverness	Russell Johnston	Liberal	Alliance 1981-
Kilmarnock	Willie McKelvey	Labour	
Kinross and West Perthshire	Nicholas Fairbarn	Conservative	
Kirkcaldy	Harry Gourley	Labour	
Lanark	Judith Hart	Labour	
Midlothian	Alex Eadie	Labour	
Moray and Nairn	Alex Pollock	Conservative	
Motherwell and Wishaw	Jeremy Bray	Labour	
North Angus and Mearns	Alick Buchanan-Smith	Conservative	
North Lanarkshire	John Smith	Labour	
Orkney and Zetland	Jo Grimond	Liberal	Alliance 1981-
Paisley	Allen Adams	Labour	
Perth and East Perthshire	Bill Walker	Conservative	
Ross and Cromarty	Hamish Grey	Conservative	
Roxburgh Selkirk and Peebles	David Steel	Liberal	Alliance 1981-
Rutherglen	Gregor Mackenzie	Labour	
South Angus	Peter Fraser	Conservative	
South Ayrshire	George Foulkes	Labour	
Stirling Falkirk and Grangemouth	Harry Ewing	Labour	
West Aberdeenshire	Russell Fairgrieve	Conservative	
West Dunbartonshire	Ian Campbell	Labour	
West Lothian	Tom Dalyell	Labour	
West Renfrewshire	Norman Buchan	Labour	
West Stirlingshire	Dennis Canavan	Labour	
Na h-Eileanan an lar	Donald Stewart	SNP	

== By-elections ==
- 1980 Glasgow Central By-Election, Bob McTaggart, Labour
- 1982 Glasgow Hillhead By-election, Roy Jenkins, SDP/Alliance
- 1982 Coatbridge and Airdrie By-election, Thomas Clarke, Labour
- 1982 Glasgow Queen's Park By-election, Helen McElhone, Labour

== See also ==
- Lists of MPs for constituencies in Scotland
