= Results of the 1979 United Kingdom general election =

The results of the 1979 United Kingdom general election, by parliamentary constituency were as follows:

Constituency	Cnty	Rgn	Last elctn	Winning party				Turnout (Note: Excludes spoilt ballots)	Votes										
Constituency	Cnty	Rgn	Last elctn	Party	Votes	Share	Majrty	Turnout	Con	Lab (Note: Excludes Speaker) (Note: Includes Labour Party and allied Co-operative Party)	Lib	SNP	UUP	NF	PC	SDLP	DUP	Other (Note: Includes all other parties, all independent candidates and the Speaker)	Total
Aberavon	WGM	WLS	Lab	Lab	31,665	61.7%	18,973	79.2%	12,692	31,665	4,624				1,954			406	47,179
Aberdare	MGM	WLS	Lab	Lab	26,716	71.6%	20,263	78.6%	6,453	26,716					3,652			518	37,339
Aberdeen North	ADC	SCT	Lab	Lab	26,771	59.3%	19,114	69.7%	7,657	26,771	4,887	5,796							45,111
Aberdeen South	ADC	SCT	Con	Con	20,820	40.7%	772	78.6%	20,820	20,048	5,901	4,361							54,430
Aberdeenshire East	ADS	SCT	SNP	Con	16,827	42.8%	558	72.4%	16,827	6,201		16,269							39,297
Aberdeenshire West	ADS	SCT	Con	Con	21,086	40.9%	2,766	75.9%	21,086	7,907	18,320	4,260							51,573
Abertillery	GNT	WLS	Lab	Lab	21,698	76.0%	17,085	80.2%	4,613	21,698					2,248				28,559
Abingdon	BRK	SE	Con	Con	41,211	53.8%	22,291	79.5%	41,211	18,920	16,164							381	76,676
Accrington	LAN	NW	Lab	Lab	19,576	48.9%	3,294	78.7%	16,282	19,576	3,646			508					40,012
Acton	LND	LND	Con	Con	21,056	51.9%	5,798	71.4%	21,056	15,258	3,549			501				243	40,607
Aldershot	HAM	SE	Con	Con	38,014	57.5%	23,576	76.5%	38,014	13,698	14,438								66,150
Aldridge-Brownhills	WMD	WM	Con	Con	26,289	50.3%	5,668	82.5%	26,289	20,621	5,398								52,308
Altrincham and Sale	GTM	NW	Con	Con	29,873	51.6%	15,230	77.7%	29,873	14,643	12,603							796	57,915
Anglesey	GWN	WLS	Con	Con	15,100	39.0%	2,817	81.2%	15,100	12,283	3,500				7,863				38,746
Angus South	AGS	SCT	SNP	Con	20,029	43.6%	963	79.9%	20,029	4,023	2,218	19,066							45,936
Argyll	AYB	SCT	SNP	Con	12,191	36.8%	1,646	76.1%	12,191	5,283	5,113	10,545							33,132
Armagh	NIR	NIR	UUP	UUP	31,668	48.5%	8,123	70.1%					31,668			23,545	5,634	4,384	65,231
Arundel	WSX	SE	Con	Con	43,968	65.0%	30,760	73.9%	43,968	10,509	13,208								67,685
Ashfield	NTT	EM	Lab	Lab	33,116	52.8%	7,797	80.6%	25,319	33,116	3,914			397					62,746
Arundel	KNT	SE	Con	Con	26,224	55.7%	13,638	76.7%	26,224	12,586	7,631			678					47,119
Ashton-under-Lyne	GTM	NW	Lab	Lab	24,535	54.7%	8,379	76.6%	16,156	24,535	3,699			486					44,876
Aylesbury	BKM	SE	Con	Con	33,953	58.3%	19,862	78.0%	33,953	14,091	10,248								58,292
Ayr	EAR	SCT	Con	Con	18,907	43.3%	2,768	79.8%	18,907	16,139	4,656	3,998							43,700
Banbury	OXF	SE	Con	Con	31,137	54.7%	14,514	78.3%	31,137	16,623	8,658			504					56,922
Banffshire	ADS	SCT	SNP	Con	10,580	44.6%	799	72.4%	10,580	3,381		9,781							23,742
Barking	LND	LND	Lab	Lab	18,111	52.8%	7,008	71.1%	11,103	18,111	3,679			1,021				400	34,314
Barkston Ash	NYK	YTH	Con	Con	40,381	56.3%	18,711	78.1%	40,381	21,670	7,909							1,829	71,789
Barnsley	SYK	YTH	Lab	Lab	36,276	64.0%	22,622	72.9%	13,654	36,276	5,751							986	56,667
Barrow-in-Furness	CMA	NW	Lab	Lab	22,687	53.2%	7,741	78.3%	14,946	22,687	4,983								42,616
Barry	SGM	WLS	Con	Con	30,720	50.9%	8,792	80.3%	30,720	21,928	6,105			312	1,281				60,349
Basildon	ESS	E	Lab	Con	37,919	46.9%	5,180	78.0%	37,919	32,739	9,280			880					79,938
Basingstoke	HAM	SE	Con	Con	42,625	54.1%	21,746	79.5%	42,625	20,879	14,605			677					78,786
Bassetlaw	NTT	EM	Lab	Lab	29,426	50.2%	7,179	79.4%	22,247	29,426	6,913								58,586
Bath	AVN	SW	Con	Con	23,025	46.4%	9,112	78.1%	23,025	11,407	13,913			206				1,082	49,633
Batley and Morley	WYK	YTH	Lab	Lab	22,984	49.0%	5,352	74.5%	17,632	22,984	4,943							1,308	46,867
Battersea North	LND	LND	Lab	Lab	15,834	56.2%	7,554	66.9%	9,358	15,834	2,021			772				181	27,716
Battersea South	LND	LND	Lab	Lab	13,984	45.1%	332	70.9%	13,652	13,984	2,802			561					31,000
Beaconsfield	BKM	SE	Con	Con	23,025	61.7%	21,495	76.2%	31,938	10,443	8,853			548					51,782
Bebington and Ellesmere Port	CHS	NW	Lab	Con	32,488	43.9%	486	80.7%	32,488	32,002	9,591								68,076
Beckenham	LND	LND	Con	Con	24,607	56.9%	13,751	74.7%	24,607	10,856	6,450			606				762	43,281
Bedford	BDF	E	Con	Con	31,140	51.2%	12,413	78.7%	31,140	18,727	10,129			813					60,809
Bedwellty	GNT	WLS	Lab	Lab	28,794	71.4%	20,436	79.6%	8,358	28,794					2,648			556	40,356
Beeston	NTT	EM	Con	Con	33,273	52.6%	10,196	81.3%	33,273	23,077	6,935								63,285
Belfast East	NIR	NIR	VUPP	DUP	15,994	31.4%	64	67.6%					15,930				15,994	19,065	50,989
Belfast North	NIR	NIR	UUP	DUP	11,690	27.6%	995	65.1%					10,695			7,823	11,690	12,136	42,344
Belfast South	NIR	NIR	VUPP	UUP	28,875	61.7%	17,130	67.9%					28,875			3,694		14,221	46,790
Belfast West	NIR	NIR	SDLP	SDLP	16,480	49.5%	8,235	56.5%					8,245			16,480	3,716	4,848	33,289
Belper	DBY	EM	Lab	Con	27,193	44.4%	882	83.6%	27,193	26,311	7,331			460					61,295
Bermondsey	LND	LND	Lab	Lab	19,338	63.6%	11,756	59.3%	7,582	19,338	2,072			1,175				239	30,406
Berwick and East Lothian	ELO	SCT	Lab	Lab	21,977	43.5%	1,673	82.9%	20,304	21,977	4,948	3,300							60,919
Berwick-upon-Tweed	NBL	NE	Lib	Lib	19,351	54.3%	5,688	83.8%	13,663	2,602	19,351								35,616
Bethnal Green and Bow	LND	LND	Lab	Lab	14,227	49.9%	7,554	55.5%	5,567	14,227	6,673			1,740				336	28,543
Bexleyheath	LND	LND	Con	Con	21,888	53.7%	8,546	80.1%	21,888	13,342	4,782			749					40,761
Birkenhead	MSY	NW	Lab	Lab	20,803	49.9%	5,909	73.9%	14,894	20,803	5,708							306	41,711
Birmingham Edgbaston	WMD	WM	Con	Con	25,192	54.1%	9,587	67.8%	25,192	15,605	4,377							1,390	46,564
Birmingham Erdington	WMD	WM	Lab	Lab	20,105	46.0%	680	67.9%	19,425	20,105	3,487			687					43,704
Birmingham Hall Green	WMD	WM	Con	Con	27,072	54.5%	9,564	73.3%	27,072	17,508	4,440			615				1,390	49,635
Birmingham Handsworth	WMD	WM	Lab	Lab	16,998	55.2%	3,209	68.4%	13,789	16,998									30,787
Birmingham Ladywood	WMD	WM	Lab	Lab	13,450	63.5%	7,759	62.3%	5,691	13,450	2,030								21,071
Birmingham Northfield	WMD	WM	Lab	Con	27,072	45.4%	204	70.6%	25,304	25,100	4,538			614				144	55,700
Birmingham Perry Barr	WMD	WM	Lab	Lab	18,674	47.6%	491	75.8%	18,183	18,674	1,811			582					39,250
Birmingham Selly Oak	WMD	WM	Lab	Con	23,175	48.7%	4,775	73.7%	23,175	18,400	5,452			401				190	47,618
Birmingham Small Heath	WMD	WM	Lab	Lab	17,735	60.5%	11,467	62.9%	6,268	17,735	4,470			490				349	29,312
Birmingham Sparkbrook	WMD	WM	Lab	Lab	18,717	62.8%	8,319	65.0%	10,398	18,717								715	29,830
Birmingham Stechford	WMD	WM	Lab	Lab	21,166	48.4%	1,649	71.6%	19,517	21,166	2,349			698					43,730
Birmingham Yardley	WMD	WM	Lab	Con	20,193	47.6%	1,164	73.8%	20,193	19,029	2,491			749					42,462
Bishop Auckland	DUR	NE	Lab	Lab	27,200	48.8%	6,040	74.7%	21,160	27,200	7,439								55,799
Blaby	LEI	EM	Con	Con	33,221	58.1%	20,640	83.3%	33,221	12,581	9,277			2,056					57,135
Blackburn	LAN	NW	Lab	Lab	19,683	50.7%	5,490	74.0%	14,193	19,683	4,371			565					38,813
Blackpool North	LAN	NW	Con	Con	23,209	53.7%	10,229	72.6%	23,209	12,980	6,127			943					43,259
Blackpool South	LAN	NW	Con	Con	21,762	51.5%	8,848	72.1%	21,762	12,914	7,057			524					42,257
Blaydon	TWR	NE	Lab	Lab	24,687	53.4%	8,509	79.1%	16,178	24,687	5,364								46,229
Blyth	NBL	NE	Lab	Lab	25,047	40.1%	7,060	78.3%	14,194	25,047	5,176							17,987	62,404
Bodmin	CUL	SW	Con	Con	27,922	54.9%	10,029	82.5%	27,922	3,508	17,893			235				1,330	50,023
Bolsover	DBY	EM	Lab	Lab	27,495	66.6%	17,379	78.3%	10,116	27,495	3,688								41,299
Bolton East	GTM	NW	Lab	Lab	21,920	47.6%	1,852	78.7%	20,068	21,920	3,603			457					46,048
Bolton West	GTM	NW	Lab	Lab	17,857	44.8%	600	79.4%	17,257	17,857	4,392			348					39,854
Bootle	MSY	NW	Lab	Lab	26,900	61.0%	15,159	70.4%	11,741	26,900	4,531							911	44,083
Bosworth	LEI	EM	Con	Con	37,030	48.5%	8,435	84.6%	37,030	28,595	10,032			682					76,339
Bothwell	NLK	SCT	Lab	Lab	26,492	55.0%	15,217	78.6%	11,275	26,492	5,225	5,202							48,194
Bournemouth East	DOR	SW	Con	Con	25,808	62.6%	18,255	73.1%	25,808	7,553	6,738							1,104	41,203
Bournemouth West	DOR	SW	Con	Con	25,873	59.8%	16,626	70.5%	25,873	9,247	7,677			438					43,235
Bradford North	WYK	YTH	Lab	Lab	25,069	50.9%	7,521	71.8%	17,548	25,069	5,819			614				158	49,208
Bradford South	WYK	YTH	Lab	Lab	26,323	47.1%	4,318	73.2%	22,005	26,323	7,127			422					55,877
Bradford West	WYK	YTH	Lab	Lab	24,309	53.8%	7,755	69.1%	16,554	24,309	3,668			633					45,164
Braintree	ESS	E	Con	Con	31,593	52.0%	12,518	80.9%	31,593	19,075	10,115								60,783
Brecon and Radnor	POW	WLS	Lab	Con	22,660	47.2%	3,027	84.2%	22,660	19,633	4,654				1,031				47,978
Brent East	LND	LND	Lab	Lab	20,351	53.3%	6,343	66.9%	14,008	20,351	2,799			706				290	38,155
Brent North	LND	LND	Con	Con	29,995	54.2%	11,383	76.7%	29,995	18,612	5,872			873					55,352
Brent South	LND	LND	Lab	Lab	24,178	59.4%	11,606	68.3%	12,572	24,178	2,859			811				277	40,697
Brentford and Isleworth	LND	LND	Con	Con	27,527	49.4%	4,994	78.1%	27,527	22,533	4,208			738				711	55,714
Brentwood and Ongar	ESS	E	Con	Con	29,113	60.4%	16,931	80.6%	29,113	12,182	6,882								48,177
Bridgwater	SOM	SW	Con	Con	31,259	54.0%	14,450	79.2%	31,259	16,809	9,793								57,861
Bridlington	HUM	YTH	Con	Con	27,988	54.8%	15,295	74.2%	27,988	12,693	10,390								51,071
Brigg and Scunthorpe	HUM	YTH	Lab	Con	31,130	43.4%	486	75.6%	31,130	30,644	7,764							2,165	71,703
Brighouse and Spenborough	WYK	YTH	Lab	Con	23,448	44.7%	1,734	80.2%	23,448	21,714	7,278								52,440
Brighton Kemptown	SXE	SE	Con	Con	25,512	53.6%	8,008	74.2%	25,512	17,504	8,098			404					47,599
Brighton Pavilion	SXE	SE	Con	Con	22,218	53.7%	10,119	72.6%	22,218	12,099	5,965			436				638	41,355
Bristol North East	AVN	SW	Lab	Lab	19,337	51.6%	5,652	73.5%	13,685	19,337	3,693			320				469	37,604
Bristol North West	AVN	SW	Lab	Con	25,915	48.6%	4,677	81.3%	25,915	21,238	5,857			264				73	53,347
Bristol South	AVN	SW	Lab	Lab	25,038	57.9%	11,183	71.9%	13,855	25,038	3,815			392				135	43,235
Bristol South East	AVN	SW	Lab	Lab	24,878	45.4%	1,890	78.4%	22,988	24,878	6,371			523				66	54,826
Bristol West	AVN	SW	Con	Con	22,257	52.6%	12,566	71.6%	22,257	9,691	8,881			246				1,247	42,322
Bromsgrove and Redditch	WOR	WM	Con	Con	44,621	54.3%	15,885	78.7%	44,621	28,736	8,066			752					82,175
Buckingham	BKM	SE	Con	Con	41,719	51.3%	13,967	78.6%	41,719	27,752	11,045			803					81,319
Burnley	LAN	SW	Lab	Lab	20,172	50.8%	6,110	77.7%	14,062	20,172	5,091							352	39,677
Burton	STS	WM	Con	Con	29,821	54.0%	9,801	78.8%	29,821	20,020	5,383								55,224
Bury and Radcliffe	GTM	SW	Lab	Lab	29,194	45.3%	38	82.6%	29,156	29,194	5,711			414					64,475
Bury St Edmunds	SFK	E	Con	Con	41,426	57.0%	20,259	76.3%	41,426	21,167	10,836								73,429
Bute and North Ayrshire	NAR	SCT	Con	Con	17,317	45.7%	4,313	75.8%	17,317	13,004	2,280	5,272							37,873
Caernarvon	GWN	WLS	PC	PC	17,420	49.7%	8,724	81.5%	6,968	8,696	1,999				17,420				35,083
Caerphilly	GNT	WLS	Lab	Lab	27,280	58.8%	18,497	78.8%	8,783	27,280	3,430				6,931				46,424
Caithness and Sutherland	HLD	SCT	Lab	Lab	9,613	41.5%	2,539	78.4%	7,074	9,613		6,487							23,714
Cambridge	CAM	E	Con	Con	25,568	45.7%	4,796	72.0%	25,568	20,772	9,285			311					55,936
Cambridgeshire	CAM	E	Con	Con	41,218	56.5%	23,289	78.3%	41,218	17,929	13,780								72,927
Cannock	STS	WM	Lab	Lab	25,050	52.8%	7,346	79.8%	17,704	25,050	4,729								47,483
Canterbury	KNT	SE	Con	Con	38,805	58.3%	22,637	74.7%	38,805	16,168	10,665			941					66,578
Cardiff North	SGM	WLS	Con	Con	17,181	47.3%	4,048	75.7%	17,181	13,133	4,921				1,081				36,316
Cardiff North West	SGM	WLS	Con	Con	17,925	51.0%	6,262	80.6%	17,925	11,663	4,832				743				35,163
Cardiff South East	SGM	WLS	Lab	Lab	23,871	59.3%	8,701	71.6%	23,871	15,170					628			619	40,288
Cardiff West	SGM	WLS	Lab	Spkr	27,035	85.6%	23,763	60.8%	23,871	15,170				1,287	3,272			27,035	31,594
Cardigan	DFD	WLS	Lib	Lib	13,227	35.6%	2,194	81.5%	11,033	7,488	13,227				5,382				37,130
Carlisle	CMA	NW	Lab	Lab	21,343	49.7%	4,566	80.0%	16,777	21,343	4,829								42,951
Carlton	NTT	EM	Con	Con	31,762	52.6%	12,773	78.9%	31,762	18,989	9,077			606					60,434
Carmarthen	DFD	WLS	PC	Lab	18,667	35.9%	1,978	84.4%	12,272	18,667	4,186			149	16,689			126	52,086
Carshalton	LND	LND	Con	Con	26,492	51.3%	10,371	76.8%	26,492	16,121	8,112			919					51,644
Central Ayrshire	NAR	SCT	Lab	Lab	27,438	51.1%	11,704	79.8%	15,734	27,438	4,896	5,596							53,664
Central Dunbartonshire	WDB	SCT	Lab	Lab	20,515	51.9%	12,003	80.0%	8,512	20,515	3,099	6,055						1,329	39,510
Central Fife	FIF	SCT	Lab	Lab	27,619	58.0%	18,022	77.4%	9,597	27,619		9,208						1,172	47,596
Cheadle	GTM	NW	Con	Con	32,407	58.8%	17,139	81.8%	32,407	7,415	15,268								55,090
Chelmsford	ESS	E	Con	Con	33,808	49.6%	5,471	81.0%	33,808	6,041	28,337								68,186
Chelsea	LND	LND	Con	Con	21,782	66.1%	15,690	57.3%	21,782	6,092	4,544			342				195	57,515
Cheltenham	GLS	SW	Con	Con	25,618	51.0%	10,538	77.6%	25,618	9,185	15,080			342					50,225
Chertsey and Walton	SRY	SE	Con	Con	25,810	49.0%	12,024	76.6%	25,810	12,211	13,786			819					52,626
Chesham and Amersham	BKS	SE	Con	Con	32,924	61.4%	20,596	79.7%	32,924	7,645	12,328			697					53,594
Chesham and Amersham	DUR	NE	Lab	Lab	38,672	60.4%	22,560	76.8%	16,112	38,672	9,247								64,031
Chesham and Amersham	DBY	EM	Lab	Lab	31,049	57.4%	13,604	73.4%	17,445	31,049	5,617								54,111
Chichester	WSX	SE	Con	Con	34,696	62.3%	23,776	75.6%	34,696	8,569	10,920							1,519	55,704
Chingford	LND	LND	Con	Con	24,640	56.1%	12,383	78.4%	24,640	12,257	5,225			1,157				649	43,928
Chippenham	WIL	SW	Con	Con	29,308	49.2%	4,697	80.0%	29,308	5,146	24,611							521	59,586
Chipping Barnet	LND	LND	Con	Con	25,154	57.1%	14,007	75.6%	25,154	11,147	6,867			865					44,033
Chislehurst	LND	LND	Con	Con	23,259	54.5%	9,765	79.0%	23,259	13,494	5,335			564					42,652
Chorley	LAN	NW	Lab	Con	31,125	46.8%	2,579	82.0%	31,125	28,546	6,388			379					66,438
Christchurch and Lymington	HAM	SE	Con	Con	29,817	66.0%	22,163	77.6%	29,817	6,722	7,654							975	45,168
Cirencester and Tewkesbury	GLS	SW	Con	Con	37,651	56.0%	19,594	78.7%	37,651	11,575	18,057								67,283
City of Chester	CHS	NW	Con	Con	28,764	51.4%	9,314	77.6%	28,764	7,711	19,450								55,925
City of London and Westminster South	LND	LND	Con	Con	16,851	60.7%	9,784	55.2%	16,851	7,067	3,375			478					27,771
Clackmannan and Eastern Stirlingshire	SRG	SCT	SNP	Lab	22,780	41.9%	984	81.7%	9,778	22,780		21,796							54,354
Cleveland and Whitby	CLV	NE	Con	Con	26,735	51.0%	6,917	80.1%	26,735	19,818	5,870								52,423
Clitheroe	LAN	NW	Con	Con	25,081	57.1%	11,579	80.7%	25,081	13,502	5,362								43,945
Coatbridge and Airdrie	NLK	SCT	Lab	Lab	27,598	60.9%	15,156	75.3%	12,442	27,598		5,260							45,300
Colchester	ESS	E	Con	Con	36,740	52.9%	13,863	76.6%	36,740	22,877	9,794								69,411
Colne Valley	WYK	YTH	Lib	Lib	20,151	38.4%	2,352	81.8%	14,450	17,799	20,151							101	52,501
Consett	DUR	NE	Lab	Lab	26,708	61.3%	15,867	75.8%	10,841	26,708	6,048								43,597
Conway	CLY	WLS	Con	Con	36,740	44.7%	6,073	79.0%	18,142	12,069	6,867				3,497				40,575
Cornwall North	CUL	SW	Lib	Con	24,489	51.7%	3,747	86.1%	24,489	1,514	20,742			224				442	47,411
Coventry North East	WMD	WM	Lab	Lab	27,010	57.3%	10,523	72.7%	16,487	27,010	2,291			546				768	47,062
Coventry North West	WMD	WM	Lab	Lab	19,460	50.1%	3,971	79.2%	15,489	19,460	3,413			359				98	38,819
Coventry South East	WMD	WM	Lab	Lab	19,583	55.0%	7,486	69.9%	12,097	19,583	2,984			513				426	35,603
Coventry South West	WMD	WM	Lab	Con	27,928	49.3%	5,654	81.5%	27,928	22,274	5,921			482				79	56,684
Crewe	CHS	NW	Lab	Lab	22,888	48.3%	4,237	77.5%	18,051	22,288	5,430			352					46,121
Crosby	MSY	NW	Con	Con	34,768	57.0%	19,272	75.2%	34,768	15,496	9,302							1,489	61,055
Croydon Central	LND	LND	Con	Con	26,457	52.5%	7,958	75.7%	26,457	18,499	5,112							354	50,422
Croydon North East	LND	LND	Con	Con	21,560	51.0%	6,776	74.1%	21,560	14,784	5,459			464					42,267
Croydon North West	LND	LND	Con	Con	19,928	49.4%	3,769	72.5%	19,928	16,159	4,239								40,326
Croydon South	LND	LND	Con	Con	30,874	64.9%	20,868	76.7%	30,874	6,249	10,006			469					47,598
Dagenham	LND	LND	Lab	Lab	24,707	52.6%	10,107	69.1%	14,600	24,707	5,583			1,553				553	46,994
Darlington	DUR	NE	Lab	Lab	22,565	45.5%	1,052	78.4%	21,513	22,565	5,054			444					49,576
Dartford	KNT	SE	Lab	Con	21,195	45.9%	1,392	80.4%	21,195	19,803	4,407			476				328	46,209
Darwen	LAN	NW	Lab	Con	30,789	52.6%	13,026	78.0%	30,789	17,763	9,928								58,480
Daventry	NTH	EM	Con	Con	41,422	56.6%	21,483	80.5%	41,422	19,939	11,286			522					73,169
Dearne Valley	SYK	YTH	Lab	Lab	31,783	68.8%	22,735	72.0%	9,048	31,783	5,352								46,183
Denbigh	CLY	WLS	Con	Con	23,683	44.9%	8,850	80.0%	23,683	9,276	14,833				4,915				52,707
Deptford	LND	LND	Lab	Lab	19,391	54.2%	7,753	63.8%	11,638	19,391	2,774			1,490				472	35,765
Derby North	DBY	EM	Lab	Lab	28,797	44.9%	214	76.8%	28,583	28,797	6,093			592				116	64,181
Derby South	DBY	EM	Lab	Lab	26,945	50.0%	6,092	71.4%	20,853	26,945	5,196			587				268	53,849
Devizes	WIL	SW	Con	Con	32,439	50.9%	16,088	79.6%	32,439	16,351	14,059							855	63,704
Dewsbury	WYK	YTH	Lab	Lab	22,829	46.7%	4,381	77.1%	18,448	22,829	7,580								48,857
Don Valley	SYK	YTH	Lab	Lab	39,603	55.6%	17,360	74.7%	22,243	39,603	8,238							1,118	71,202
Doncaster	SYK	YTH	Lab	Lab	22,184	48.9%	2,976	75.0%	19,208	22,184	3,646			300					45,338
Dorking	SRY	SE	Con	Con	29,003	61.4%	19,763	77.9%	29,003	8,970	9,240								47,213
Dorset North	DOR	SW	Con	Con	40,046	62.2%	23,296	79.7%	40,046	7,543	16,750								64,339
Dorset South	DOR	SW	Con	Con	32,372	55.7%	15,239	78.3%	32,372	17,133	8,649								58,154
Dorset West	DOR	SW	Con	Con	26,281	58.7%	16,505	79.0%	26,281	7,999	9,776			514				192	44,762
Dover and Deal	KNT	SE	Con	Con	30,606	50.0%	7,942	80.7%	30,606	22,664	6,906			378				642	61,196
Dudley East	WMD	WM	Lab	Lab	22,521	53.8%	7,687	70.1%	14,834	22,521	3,639			844					41,838
Dudley West	WMD	WM	Lab	Con	30,158	51.0%	1,139	76.3%	30,158	29,019									59,177
Dulwich	LND	LND	Lab	Lab	18,557	43.0%	122	70.4%	18,435	18,557	4,759			920				468	43,139
Dumfries	DFG	SCT	Con	Con	22,704	45.2%	9,004	78.1%	22,704	13,700	7,169	6,647							50,220
Dundee East	AGS	SCT	SNP	SNP	23,654	47.3%	10,457	78.4%	12,892	23,654		13,197						316	50,059
Dundee West	AGS	SCT	Lab	Lab	20,497	41.0%	2,519	77.7%	9,072	17,978	2,317	20,497						95	49,959
Dunfermline	FIF	SCT	Lab	Lab	22,803	44.3%	7,313	79.3%	15,490	22,803	5,803	7,351							51,447
Durham	DUR	NE	Lab	Lab	30,903	52.3%	11,237	76.4%	19,666	30,903	8,572								59,141
Ealing North	LND	LND	Lab	Con	27,524	46.0%	1,480	77.8%	27,524	26,044	5,162			1,047					59,777
Easington	DUR	NE	Lab	Lab	29,537	60.6%	17,556	74.3%	11,981	29,537	6,979								48,497
East Dunbartonshire	EDB	SCT	SNP	Lab	23,268	37.9%	2,324	83.9%	20,944	23,268	4,600	12,654							61,466
East Fife	FIF	SCT	Con	Con	20,117	43.0%	9,355	79.0%	20,117	9,339	10,762	6,612						1,172	46,830
East Flintshire	CLY	WLS	Lab	Lab	29,339	48.3%	6,223	81.7%	23,116	29,339	6,736				1,198			307	60,389
East Grinstead	SXE	SE	Con	Con	28,279	62.0%	17,177	77.1%	28,279	6,196	11,102								45,577
East Hertfordshire	HRT	E	Con	Con	41,599	55.5%	21,460	77.8%	41,599	20,139	11,393			1,819					74,950
East Kilbride	SLK	SCT	Lab	Lab	31,401	53.9%	14,273	79.7%	17,128	31,401		9,090						658	58,277
East Renfrewshire	RFW	SCT	Con	Con	25,910	49.9%	13,238	80.6%	25,910	12,672	9,366	3,989							51,937
East Surrey	SRY	SE	Con	Con	28,266	62.8%	19,400	78.4%	28,266	7,398	8,866			452					44,982
Eastbourne	SXE	SE	Con	Con	37,168	63.1%	26,084	76.7%	37,168	10,166	11,084			533					58,951
Eastleigh	HAM	SE	Con	Con	38,516	55.9%	20,294	80.7%	38,516	18,222	12,143								68,881
Ebbw Vale	GWT	WLS	Lab	Lab	20,028	69.2%	16,091	79.9%	3,937	20,028	3,082				1,884				28,931
Eccles	GTM	NW	Lab	Lab	24,280	53.6%	8,059	77.5%	16,221	24,280	4,448							368	45,317
Edinburgh Central	EDB	SCT	Lab	Lab	12,191	47.8%	4,661	67.5%	7,530	12,191	3,096	2,486						176	25,479
Edinburgh East	EDB	SCT	Lab	Lab	23,477	53.7%	8,817	76.1%	14,660	23,477		5,296						297	43,730
Edinburgh Leith	EDB	SCT	Lab	Lab	12,961	46.3%	4,017	75.2%	8,944	12,961	3,382	2,706							27,993
Edinburgh North	EDB	SCT	Con	Con	14,170	43.6%	4,397	71.8%	14,170	9,773	5,045	3,521							32,509
Edinburgh Pentlands	EDB	SCT	Con	Con	17,684	39.3%	1,198	76.8%	17,684	16,486	5,919	4,934							45,023
Edinburgh South	EDB	SCT	Con	Con	17,986	39.8%	2,460	77.3%	17,986	15,526	7,400	3,800						552	45,264
Edinburgh West	EDB	SCT	Con	Con	19,360	45.4%	7,351	77.8%	19,360	12,009	7,330	3,904							42,603
Edmonton	LND	LND	Lab	Lab	20,713	47.1%	1,980	74.6%	18,733	20,713	3,726			1,213					44,385
Enfield North	LND	LND	Lab	Con	24,927	48.1%	3,483	78.1%	24,927	21,444	4,681			816					51,866
Epping Forest	ESS	E	Con	Con	29,447	57.7%	15,453	76.6%	29,447	13,994	6,528			1,110					51,079
Epsom and Ewell	SRY	SE	Con	Con	39,104	61.9%	26,358	76.9%	39,104	11,315	12,746								63,165
Erith and Crayford	KNT	SE	Lab	Lab	22,450	47.3%	2,733	77.5%	19,717	22,450	4,512			838					47,517
Esher	SRY	SE	Con	Con	24,152	65.1%	16,841	77.5%	24,152	5,634	7,311								37,097
Eton and Slough	BKS	SE	Lab	Lab	20,710	42.6%	1,340	74.9%	19,370	20,710	5,254			943				2,359	48,636
Exeter	DEV	SW	Con	Con	27,173	48.4%	8,027	81.6%	27,173	19,146	8,756							1,053	56,128
Eye	SFK	E	Con	Con	28,707	52.0%	15,021	79.1%	28,707	13,686	12,259							592	55,244
Falmouth and Camborne	CUL	SW	Con	Con	30,523	56.7%	16,600	77.3%	30,523	13,923	7,489			280				1,637	53,852
Fareham	HAM	SE	Con	Con	28,730	59.0%	17,045	79.1%	28,730	8,041	11,685			252					48,708
Farnham	SRY	SE	Con	Con	30,127	58.3%	16,469	80.0%	30,127	7,497	13,658							374	51,656
Farnworth	GTM	SE	Con	Con	27,965	50.1%	8,107	77.8%	19,858	27,965	8,043								55,866
Faversham	KNT	SE	Con	Con	33,513	54.4%	12,162	78.5%	33,513	21,351	6,349			439					61,653
Feltham and Heston	LND	LND	Lab	Lab	28,675	48.3%	4,105	74.3%	24,570	28,675	5,051			898				168	59,362
Fermanagh and South Tyrone	NIR	NIR	Ind	Ind	22,398	36.0%	4,987	87.1%					17,411					44,860	62,271
Finchley	LND	LND	Con	Con	20,918	52.5%	7,878	72.5%	20,918	13,040	5,254			534				86	39,832
Folkestone and Hythe	KNT	SE	Con	Con	26,837	55.7%	16,020	72.6%	26,837	10,015	10,817			478					48,147
Fulham	LND	LND	Lab	Con	20,249	46.9%	1,499	76.1%	20,249	18,750	3,882			478					43,359
Fylde North	LAN	NW	Con	Con	35,366	60.1%	20,990	75.3%	35,366	14,376	8,630			481					58,853
Fylde South	LAN	NW	Con	Con	45,883	63.4%	32,247	76.8%	45,883	13,636	11,938			941					72,398
Gainsborough	LIN	EM	Con	Con	24,040	46.4%	7,155	79.0%	24,040	10,335	16,885							570	51,830
Galloway	DAG	SCT	SNP	Con	15,306	46.4%	7,155	79.0%	15,306	2,841	2,852	12,384						570	51,830
Gateshead East	TWR	NE	Lab	Lab	28,776	61.2%	14,698	75.3%	14,078	28,776	4,201								47,055
Gateshead West	TWR	NE	Lab	Lab	13,533	67.2%	8,312	69.3%	5,221	13,533	1,185			186					20,125
Gillingham	KNT	SE	Con	Con	26,791	53.1%	10,499	78.9%	26,791	16,292	6,219			528				593	50,425
Glasgow Cathcart	GSO	SCT	Con	Lab	17,550	45.9%	1,600	78.6%	15,950	17,550	2,042	2,653							38,105
Glasgow Central	GSO	SCT	Lab	Lab	8,542	72.5%	6,605	59.5%	1,937	8,542		1,308							11,787
Glasgow Craigton	GSO	SCT	Lab	Lab	19,952	59.9%	10,472	75.2%	9,480	19,952		3,881							33,313
Glasgow Garscadden	GSO	SCT	Lab	Lab	23,591	61.5%	15,198	73.2%	8,393	23,591		6,012						374	38,370
Glasgow Govan	GSO	SCT	Lab	Lab	11,676	67.9%	8,488	75.7%	3,188	11,676		2,340							17,204
Glasgow Hillhead	GSO	SCT	Lab	Lab	12,368	41.0%	2,002	71.9%	12,368	10,366	4,349	3,050							30,133
Glasgow Kelvingrove	GSO	SCT	Lab	Lab	11,133	50.3%	4,759	65.6%	6,374	11,133	2,412	2,199							22,118
Glasgow Maryhill	GSO	SCT	Lab	Lab	22,602	66.2%	17,496	67.7%	5,106	22,602	2,332	3,812						287	33,599
Glasgow Pollok	GSO	SCT	Lab	Lab	21,420	49.3%	8,492	73.7%	12,928	21,420	3,946	4,187						1,014	43,494
Glasgow Provan	GSO	SCT	Lab	Lab	24,083	69.5%	18,844	66.0%	5,239	24,083		4,767						570	34,659
Glasgow Queen's Park	GSO	SCT	Lab	Lab	15,120	64.4%	9,478	68.4%	5,642	15,120		2,276						454	23,492
Glasgow Shettleston	GSO	SCT	Lab	Lab	13,955	64.1%	9,161	68.2%	4,794	13,955		3,022							21,771
Glasgow Springburn	GSO	SCT	Lab	Lab	18,871	66.1%	12,771	67.8%	6,100	18,871		3,587							28,558
Gloucester	GLS	SW	Con	Con	25,163	48.7%	6,416	79.5%	25,163	18,747	7,213			527					51,650
Goole	HUM	YTH	Lab	Lab	27,690	57.6%	11,251	72.8%	16,439	27,690	3,976								48,105
Gosport	HAM	SE	Con	Con	24,553	61.8%	14,093	77.5%	24,553	10,460	4,741								39,754
Gower	WGM	WLS	Lab	Lab	24,963	53.2%	10,641	80.8%	14,322	24,963	4,245				3,357				46,887
Grantham	LIN	EM	Con	Con	36,697	55.5%	18,150	78.2%	36,697	18,547	10,852								66,096
Gravesend	KNT	SE	Lab	Con	37,592	52.0%	9,346	81.4%	37,592	28,246	5,917			603					72,358
Greenock and Port Glasgow	IVC	SCT	Lab	Lab	20,650	46.8%	4,625	74.2%	4,314	20,650	16,025	2,989						114	44,092
Greenwich	LND	LND	Lab	Lab	18,975	52.1%	6,842	70.6%	12,133	18,975	3,870			951				460	36,389
Grimsby	HUM	EM	Lab	Lab	26,282	52.0%	6,241	75.8%	20,041	26,282	3,837			137				214	50,511
Guildford	SRY	SE	Con	Con	31,595	57.3%	19,906	75.3%	31,595	11,689	11,673							232	55,189
Hackney Central	LND	LND	Lab	Lab	16,506	59.0%	8,788	60.2%	7,718	16,506	1,835			1,418				476	27,953
Hackney North and Stoke Newington	LND	LND	Lab	Lab	14,688	51.6%	5,221	60.9%	9,467	14,688	3,033			860				440	28,488
Hackney South and Shoreditch	LND	LND	Lab	Lab	14,016	54.1%	6,704	60.1%	7,312	14,016	2,387			1,958				215	25,888
Halesowen and Stourbridge	WMD	WM	Con	Con	33,247	49.6%	8,965	79.3%	33,247	24,282	8,597			921					67,047
Halifax	WYK	YTH	Lab	Lab	21,416	43.8%	1,234	76.7%	20,182	21,416	6,853			455					48,906
Haltemprice	HUM	YTH	Con	Con	34,525	55.8%	19,888	77.3%	34,525	12,743	14,637								61,509
Hamilton	SLK	SCT	Lab	Lab	24,593	59.7%	14,799	79.6%	9,794	24,593		6,842							41,229
Hammersmith North	LND	LND	Lab	Lab	17,241	48.2%	3,506	70.4%	13,735	17,241	4,147			462				193	35,778
Hampstead	LND	LND	Con	Con	20,410	47.3%	3,681	67.4%	20,410	16,729	5,753			255					43,147
Harborough	LEI	EM	Con	Con	33,328	60.4%	21,978	80.0%	33,328	11,350	9,529			1,002					55,209
Harlow	ESS	E	Lab	Lab	22,698	42.7%	1,392	78.7%	21,306	22,698	8,289			840					53,133
Harrogate	NYK	YTH	Con	Con	30,551	59.5%	18,530	74.3%	30,551	8,221	12,021			585					51,378
Harrow Central	LND	LND	Con	Con	16,627	49.0%	4,503	75.1%	16,627	12,124	4,785			427					33,963
Harrow East	LND	LND	Con	Con	20,871	54.3%	7,878	77.9%	20,871	12,993	3,984			572					36,936
Harrow West	LND	LND	Con	Con	26,007	58.1%	15,213	78.7%	26,007	10,794	7,350			646					44,797
Hartlepool	CLV	NE	Lab	Lab	27,039	55.1%	8,162	74.7%	18,887	27,039	3,193								49,109
Harwich	ESS	E	Con	Con	37,685	54.3%	20,687	74.7%	37,685	16,998	14,094			597					69,374
Hastings	SXE	SE	Con	Con	21,311	51.5%	8,919	71.7%	21,311	12,392	6,474			344				839	41,360
Havant and Waterloo	HAM	SE	Con	Con	35,580	57.3%	20,340	75.6%	35,580	15,240	11,274								62,094
Hayes and Harlington	LND	LND	Lab	Lab	20,350	48.3%	3,302	75.0%	17,048	20,350	3,900			582				249	42,129
Hazel Grove	GTM	NW	Con	Con	32,420	55.5%	15,272	83.4%	32,420	8,846	17,148								58,414
Hemel Hempstead	HRT	E	Lab	Con	37,953	48.7%	4,989	84.8%	37,953	32,964	6,314			649					77,880
Hemsworth	WYK	YTH	Lab	Lab	36,509	69.6%	26,043	73.3%	10,466	36,509	5,474								52,449
Hendon North	LND	LND	Con	Con	20,766	52.1%	6,392	73.8%	20,766	14,374	4,113			638					39,891
Hendon South	LND	LND	Con	Con	19,981	52.8%	8,750	70.2%	19,981	11,231	5,799			290				563	37,864
Henley	OXF	SE	Con	Con	29,982	58.7%	18,289	73.8%	29,982	9,435	11,693								51,110
Hereford	HWR	WM	Con	Con	23,012	47.7%	4,970	78.5%	23,012	7,150	18,042								48,204
Hertford and Stevenage	HRT	E	Lab	Con	31,739	45.1%	1,296	80.4%	31,739	30,443	7,660			581					70,423
Hexham	NBL	NE	Con	Con	25,483	48.0%	8,548	79.5%	25,483	16,935	10,697								53,115
Heywood and Royton	GTM	NW	Lab	Lab	28,489	45.2%	2,287	76.6%	26,202	28,489	7,644			641					62,976
High Peak	DBY	EM	Con	Con	22,532	46.5%	4,755	81.8%	22,532	17,777	8,200								48,509
Hitchin	HRT	E	Con	Con	33,169	52.5%	13,229	82.2%	33,169	19,940	8,224			881				911	63,125
Holborn and St Pancras South	LND	LND	Lab	Lab	12,026	49.3%	2,323	60.4%	9,703	12,026	2,190			334				134	24,387
Holland with Boston	LIN	EM	Con	Con	35,440	55.5%	17,532	74.6%	35,440	17,908	10,480								63,828
Honiton	DEV	SW	Con	Con	37,832	62.4%	25,231	77.4%	37,832	8,756	12,601							1,423	60,612
Horncastle	LIN	EM	Con	Con	21,362	55.1%	10,529	75.2%	21,362	6,240	10,833			319					38,754
Hornchurch	LND	LND	Lab	Con	21,340	44.9%	769	78.1%	21,340	20,571	4,657			994					47,562
Hornsey	LND	LND	Con	Con	20,225	49.4%	4,037	70.1%	20,225	16,188	4,058			337				156	40,964
Horsham and Crawley	WSX	SE	Con	Con	42,529	52.2%	15,021	81.4%	42,529	27,508	10,920			493					81.450
Houghton-le-Spring	DUR	NE	Lab	Lab	30,181	68.5%	21,076	72.9%	9,105	30,181	4,479							326	44,091
Hove	SXE	SE	Con	Con	30,256	60.1%	19,449	71.6%	30,256	10,807	8,771			508					50,342
Howden	HUM	YTH	Con	Con	26,550	56.0%	14,544	74.4%	26,550	8,827	12,006								47,383
Huddersfield East	WYK	EM	Lab	Lab	19,040	47.5%	3,095	74.3%	15,945	19,040	4,890							243	40,118
Huddersfield West	WYK	EM	Lab	Con	18,504	44.2%	1,508	76.0%	18,504	16,996	6,225							101	41,826
Huntingdonshire	CAM	E	Con	Con	40,193	55.3%	21,563	77.4%	40,193	18,630	12,812			983					72,618
Huyton	LAN	NW	Lab	Lab	27,449	51.9%	7,510	72.4%	19,939	27,449	5,476								52,864
Ilford North	LND	LND	Lab	Con	26,381	51.3%	7,195	79.0%	26,381	19,186	4,568			804				452	51,391
Ilford South	LND	LND	Lab	Con	19,290	46.8%	1,688	75.9%	19,290	17,602	3,664			636					39,230
Ilkeston	DBY	EM	Lab	Lab	29,270	50.6%	8,110	78.1%	21,160	29,270	7,879								58,309
Ince	LAN	NW	Lab	Lab	34,599	56.2%	14,336	74.2%	20,263	34,599	6,294							442	61,598
Inverness	HLD	SCT	Lib	Lib	15,716	33.7%	4,157	74.4%	11,559	9,586	15,716	9,603						112	46,576
Ipswich	SFK	E	Lab	Lab	34,444	48.2%	3,741	80.8%	30,703	34,444	5,772			449				115	71,483
Isle of Ely	CAM	E	Lib	Lib	26,397	46.7%	3,330	80.8%	23,067	7,067	26,397								56,531
Isle of Wight	IOW	SE	Lib	Lib	35,889	48.2%	352	81.8%	35,537	3,014	35,889								74,440
Islington Central	LND	LND	Lab	Lab	13,415	51.5%	4,139	63.7%	9,276	13,415	2,242			797				310	26,040
Islington North	LND	LND	Lab	Lab	12,317	52.6%	4,456	61.2%	7,861	12,317	2,079			501				655	23,413
Islington South and Finsbury	LND	LND	Lab	Lab	12,581	52.0%	4,344	62.9%	8,237	12,581	1,991			824				544	24,177
Jarrow	TWR	NE	Lab	Lab	24,057	55.8%	11,528	77.5%	12,529	24,057	3,907							2,621	43,114
Keighley	WYK	YTH	Lab	Lab	24,057	55.8%	11,528	77.5%	12,529	24,057	3,907							2,621	43,114
Kensington	LND	LND	Con	Con	17,361	51.3%	5,463	64.6%	17,361	11,898	3,537			356				698	33,850
Kettering	NTH	EM	Lab	Lab	31,579	45.0%	1,478	79.3%	30,101	31,579	8,424								70,104
Kidderminster	WOR	WM	Con	Con	33,523	53.7%	15,652	77.6%	33,523	17,871	9,939			1,052					62,385
Kilmarnock	EAR	SCT	Lab	Lab	25,718	52.6%	11,467	81.1%	14,251	25,718		8,963							48,932
Kingston upon Hull Central	HUM	YTH	Lab	Lab	22,318	52.1%	7,593	70.4%	14,725	22,318	5,069			422				274	42,808
Kingston upon Hull West	HUM	YTH	Lab	Lab	19,750	55.8%	8,158	67.5%	11,592	19,750	3,656			411					35,409
Kingston upon Thames	LND	LND	Con	Con	24,944	57.9%	13,544	74.9%	11,400	24,944	6,771								43,115
Kingswood	AVN	SW	Lab	Con	23,553	45.4%	303	86.2%	23,553	23,250	4,852			258					51,913
Kinross and Western Perthshire	PAK	SCT	Con	Con	15,523	50.5%	6,478	79.5%	15,523	2,593	3,572	9,045							30,733
Kirkcaldy	FIF	SCT	Lab	Lab	25,449	53.9%	13,063	77.4%	12,386	25,449		9,416							47,251
Knutsford	CHS	NW	Con	Con	26,795	59.6%	17,803	78.0%	26,795	8,992	8,499							690	44,976
Lambeth Central	LND	LND	Lab	Lab	15,101	54.7%	5,976	63.2%	9,125	15,101	2,339			830				202	27,597
Lanark	NLK	SCT	Lab	Lab	18,118	43.2%	5,139	81.8%	12,979	18,118	2,967	7,902							41,966
Lancaster	LAN	SW	Con	Con	19,400	47.6%	4,226	79.5%	19,400	15,174	5,949			196					40,719
Leeds East	WYK	YTH	Lab	Lab	26,346	55.4%	10,536	70.9%	15,810	26,346	4,622			445				309	47,532
Leeds North East	WYK	YTH	Con	Con	20,297	49.0%	5,384	70.1%	20,297	14,913	5,329							916	41,455
Leeds North West	WYK	YTH	Con	Con	23,837	47.5%	6,214	73.1%	23,837	17,623	7,899							847	50,206
Leeds South	WYK	YTH	Lab	Lab	22,388	65.0%	14,330	68.7%	8,058	22,388	3,568			416					35,430
Leeds South East	WYK	YTH	Lab	Lab	15,921	56.3%	9,372	65.0%	6,549	15,921	5,430			168				190	28,258
Leeds West	WYK	YTH	Lab	Lab	21,290	49.4%	9,664	73.3%	11,626	21,290	9,734			466					43,116
Leek	STS	WM	Con	Con	36,508	51.9%	10,571	80.4%	36,508	25,937	6,474							1,451	70,370
Leicester East	LEI	EM	Lab	Lab	23,844	46.9%	2,856	75.6%	20,988	23,844	4,623			1,385					50,840
Leicester South	LEI	EM	Lab	Lab	24,548	46.4%	1,998	74.8%	22,550	24,548	4,856			940					52,894
Leicester West	LEI	EM	Lab	Lab	26,032	53.6%	8,838	72.3%	17,194	26,032	4,032			1,308					48,566
Leigh	GTM	SW	Lab	Lab	27,736	54.1%	9,023	76.9%	18,713	27,736	4,796								51,245
Leominster	HWR	WM	Con	Con	21,126	53.5%	4,865	81.9%	21,126	2,099	16,261								39,486
Lewes	SXE	SE	Con	Con	33,992	58.4%	21,713	76.3%	33,992	11,152	12,279			764					58,187
Lewisham East	LND	LND	Lab	Lab	22,916	46.0%	1,593	74.3%	21,323	22,916	4,265			1,168				190	49,863
Lewisham West	LND	LND	Lab	Lab	20,932	46.4%	1,050	76.0%	19,882	20,932	3,350			901					45,065
Leyton	LND	LND	Lab	Lab	21,095	51.4%	5,734	69.4%	15,361	21,095	3,425			1,179					41,060
Lichfield and Tamworth	SFS	WM	Con	Con	41,454	50.3%	8,448	81.2%	41,454	33,006	7,408			475					82,343
Lincoln	LIN	EM	Lab	Con	17,777	41.4%	602	77.0%	17,777	17,175	5,638			523				1,820	42,933
Liverpool Edge Hill	MSY	NW	Lab	Lib	12,701	52.0%	4,248	69.0%	3,098	8,453	12,701			152					24,404
Liverpool Garston	MSY	NW	Lab	Con	28,105	48.1%	2,787	73.8%	28,105	25,318	4,890							142	58,455
Liverpool Kirkdale	MSY	NW	Lab	Lab	17,043	56.1%	7,709	70.2%	9,334	17,043	3,819			198					30,394
Liverpool Scotland Exchange	MSY	NW	Lab	Lab	13,920	75.1%	11,656	57.4%	2,264	13,920	1,939							421	18,544
Liverpool Toxteth	MSY	NW	Lab	Lab	14,833	54.7%	6,143	64.8%	8,690	14,833	3,206							386	35,805
Liverpool Walton	MSY	NW	Lab	Lab	20,231	55.2%	7,558	72.8%	12,673	20,231	3,479			254					36,637
Liverpool Wavertree	MSY	NW	Con	Con	21,770	50.3%	6,942	73.4%	21,770	14,828	6,705								43,303
Liverpool West Derby	MSY	NW	Lab	Lab	22,576	55.5%	8,220	70.2%	14,356	22,576	3,765			254					40,697
Llanelli	DFD	WLS	Lab	Lab	30,416	59.5%	19,945	79.4%	10,471	30,416	5,856				3,793			617	51,153
Londonderry	NIR	NIR	UUP	UUP	31,592	49.7%	12,407	67.1%					31,592			19,185		12,846	63,623
Loughborough	LEI	EM	Lab	Con	29,788	48.0%	5,199	81.2%	29,788	24,589	6,650			484				595	62,106
Louth	LIN	EM	Con	Con	25,701	44.9%	6,675	78.2%	25,701	12,316	19,026			261					57,304
Lowestoft	SFK	E	Con	Con	33,376	50.5%	7,821	80.0%	33,376	25,555	6,783							435	82,733
Ludlow	SPS	WM	Con	Con	20,906	52.8%	8,382	78.6%	20,906	5,717	12,524			354				106	39,607
Luton East	BDF	E	Lab	Con	17,809	43.7%	847	77.7%	17,809	16,962	5,285			461				213	40,730
Luton West	BDF	E	Lab	Con	21,230	44.1%	246	78.7%	21,230	20,984	5,233			701					48,148
Macclesfield	CHS	NW	Con	Con	40,116	58.5%	23,337	78.1%	40,116	16,779	11,726								68,621
Maidstone	KNT	SE	Con	Con	37,727	52.6%	21,051	77.0%	37,727	16,632	16,676			703					71,734
Maldon	ESS	E	Con	Con	29,585	57.8%	16,737	77.9%	29,585	12,848	8,730								51,163
Manchester Ardwick	GTM	NW	Lab	Lab	15,632	55.5%	6,783	68.4%	8,849	15,632	3,675								28,156
Manchester Blackley	GTM	NW	Lab	Lab	20,346	50.4%	4,504	76.4%	15,842	20,346	3,868			326					40,382
Manchester Central	GTM	NW	Lab	Lab	14,117	70.8%	9,704	63.7%	4,413	14,117	1,052			365					19,947
Manchester Gorton	GTM	NW	Lab	Lab	22,293	53.5%	6,284	77.2%	16,009	22,293	2,867			469					41,638
Manchester Moss Side	GTM	NW	Lab	Lab	17,765	51.9%	4,531	71.5%	13,234	17,765	2,981							225	34,205
Manchester Openshaw	GTM	NW	Lab	Lab	17,099	62.1%	7,144	72.8%	9,955	17,099				296				174	27,524
Manchester Withington	GTM	NW	Con	Con	18,862	47.3%	3,352	74.7%	18,862	15,510	5,387							157	39,916
Manchester Wythenshawe	GTM	NW	Lab	Lab	23,172	54.6%	10,684	69.6%	12,488	23,172	6,766								42,426
Mansfield	NTT	EM	Lab	Lab	29,051	52.3%	11,331	77.3%	17,720	29,051	8,536			259					55,566
Melton	LEI	EM	Con	Con	40,242	58.6%	24,360	78.7%	40,242	15,882	12,596								68,720
Meriden	WMD	WM	Lab	Con	37,151	48.8%	4,127	77.0%	37,151	33,024	4,976			1,032					76,183
Merioneth	CLY	WLS	PC	PC	9,275	40.8%	3,910	83.4%	5,365	5,332	2,752				9,275				22,724
Merthyr Tydfil	GNT	WLS	Lab	Lab	22,386	71.3%	17,960	79.1%	4,426	22,386	1,275				2,962			337	31,386
Mid Bedfordshire	BDF	E	Con	Con	37,724	56.9%	20,584	81.3%	37,724	17,140	11,467								66,331
Mid Oxfordshire	OXF	SE	Con	Con	28,465	56.9%	15,461	79.1%	28,465	13,004	8,367							174	50,010
Mid Sussex	WSX	SE	Con	Con	32,548	61.2%	20,843	78.0%	32,548	8,260	11,705							697	53,210
Mid Ulster	NIR	NIR	VUPP	UUUP	29,249	44.7%	9,983	80.4%								19,266		46,199	65,465
Middlesbrough	CLV	NE	Lab	Lab	24,872	45.8%	1,098	67.9%	13,463	24,872	4,023							1,879	44,237
Middleton and Prestwich	GTM	NW	Lab	Lab	27,918	45.8%	1,098	78.9%	26,820	27,918	5,888			350					60,976
Midlothian	MLO	SCT	Lab	Lab	37,773	47.8%	16,936	77.8%	20,797	37,773	7,129	13,260							78,959
Mitcham and Morden	LND	LND	Lab	Lab	21,668	45.2%	618	76.9%	21,050	21,668	4,258			966					47,942
Monmouth	GNT	WLS	Con	Con	33,547	50.5%	9,762	83.0%	33,547	23,785	8,494				641				66,467
Montgomery	POW	WLS	Lib	Con	11,751	40.3%	1,593	81.4%	11,751	4,751	10,158				2,474				29,134
Moray	MOR	SCT	SNP	Con	14,220	40.1%	420	77.5%	14,220	3,104	4,361	13,800							35,487
Morecambe and Lonsdale	LAN	NW	Con	Con	29,068	55.4%	15,815	76.5%	29,068	13,253	10,150								52,471
Morpeth	NBL	NE	Lab	Lab	21,744	56.3%	11,831	77.4%	9,913	21,744	6,972								38,629
Motherwell and Wishaw	NLK	SCT	Lab	Lab	22,263	56.9%	10,937	77.8%	11,326	22,263		4,817						740	39,146
Nantwich	CHS	NW	Con	Con	25,624	50.3%	7,705	79.3%	25,624	17,919	6,571			814					50,928
Neath	WGM	WLS	Lab	Lab	27,071	64.5%	18,616	81.2%	8,455	27,071					6,430				41,956
Nelson and Colne	LAN	NW	Lab	Con	17,522	45.0%	436	81.6%	17,522	17,086	4,322								38,930
New Forest	HAM	SE	Con	Con	39,124	59.5%	25,450	77.2%	39,124	12,950	13,674								65,748
Newark	NTT	E	Lab	Con	27,711	45.9%	1,751	79.9%	27,711	25,960	6,773								60,444
Newbury	BRK	SE	Con	Con	33,677	52.8%	10,289	79.3%	33,677	6,676	23,388								63,741
Newcastle upon Tyne Central	TWR	NE	Lab	Lab	10,395	67.3%	7,413	65.3%	2,982	10,395	2,073								15,450
Newcastle upon Tyne East	TWR	NE	Lab	Lab	18,257	55.1%	6,170	68.0%	12,087	18,257	2,818								33,162
Newcastle upon Tyne North	TWR	NE	Con	Con	12,721	47.6%	1,711	68.0%	12,721	11,010	2,983								26,714
Newcastle upon Tyne West	TWR	NE	Lab	Lab	32,827	54.5%	11,236	72.4%	21,591	32,827	5,801								60,219
Newcastle-under-Lyme	STS	WM	Lab	Lab	28,649	48.5%	4,228	81.6%	24,421	28,649	5,878							156	59,104
Newham North East	LND	LND	Lab	Lab	22,818	54.5%	10,040	63.1%	12,778	22,818	4,027			1,769				480	41,872
Newham North West	LND	LND	Lab	Lab	18,392	61.5%	10,455	55.4%	7,937	18,392	2,377			1,217					29,923
Newham South	LND	LND	Lab	Lab	19,636	64.4%	12,773	57.1%	6,863	19,636	2,085			1,899					30,483
Newport	GWT	WLS	Lab	Lab	30,919	51.7%	9,177	79.7%	21,742	30,919	6,270			484	473				59,888
Newton	LAN	NW	Lab	Lab	41,466	51.4%	11,341	78.4%	30,125	41,466	8,471			641					80,703
Normanton	WYK	YTH	Lab	Lab	26,591	56.4%	12,193	76.8%	14,398	26,591	6,134								47,123
North Angus and Mearns	AGS	SCT	Con	Con	18,302	57.5%	10,915	73.8%	18,302	6,132		7,387							31,821
North Antrim	NIR	NIR	DUP	DUP	33,941	51.7%	18,543	64.3%					15,398			4,867	33,941	11,486	65,692
North Devon	DEV	SW	Lib	Con	31,811	50.1%	8,473	81.7%	31,811	7,108	23,338			237				1,020	63,514
North Down	NIR	NIR	UUP	Ind	36,989	59.6%	23,625	62.2%					11,728					50,353	62,081
North East Derbyshire	DBY	EM	Lab	Lab	27,218	48.1%	5,329	79.9%	21,889	27,218	7,436								56,543
North Lanarkshire	NLK	SCT	Lab	Lab	25,015	55.5%	10,820	79.7%	14,195	25,015		5,887							45,097
North Norfolk	NFK	E	Con	Con	43,952	56.9%	21,826	78.7%	43,952	22,126	10,643			548					72,269
North Somerset	SOM	SW	Con	Con	43,173	54.3%	21,051	82.2%	43,173	22,122	12,898							1,254	79,447
North West Durham	DUR	NE	Lab	Lab	29,525	61.3%	15,280	76.0%	14,245	29,525	4,394								48,161
North West Norfolk	NFK	E	Con	Con	33,796	51.0%	7,928	79.2%	33,796	25,868	6,588			548					66,252
North West Surrey	SRY	SE	Con	Con	36,219	63.8%	25,456	75.6%	36,219	10,763	9,037			796					56,815
Northampton North	NTH	EM	Lab	Con	18,597	48.2%	4,663	76.0%	18,597	13,934	5,659			373					38,563
Northampton South	NTH	EM	Con	Con	19,125	49.7%	3,634	75.3%	19,125	15,491	3,478			407					38,501
Northwich	CHS	NW	Con	Con	23,201	52.8%	8,746	80.9%	23,201	14,455	6,311								43,967
Norwich North	NFK	E	Lab	Lab	17,927	50.8%	5,591	75.6%	12,336	17,927	4,253			250				532	33,298
Norwich South	NFK	E	Lab	Lab	17,927	44.9%	1,198	80.2%	15,042	16,240	4,618			264					36,164
Norwood	LND	LND	Lab	Lab	16,282	47.3%	1,940	70.4%	14,342	16,282	3,051			707					48,857
Nottingham East	NTT	EM	Lab	Lab	15,433	50.5%	3,234	63.9%	12,199	15,433	2,270			426				252	30,580
Nottingham North	NTT	EM	Lab	Lab	25,028	46.9%	3,072	67.6%	21,956	25,028	4,900			454				1,071	78,996
Nottingham West	NTT	EM	Lab	Lab	26,301	46.5%	2,500	73.2%	21,956	26,301	5,497			718				192	56,509
Nuneaton	WAR	WM	Lab	Lab	31,403	49.9%	7,688	78.5%	23,715	31,403	6,184			1,028				504	62,959
Ogmore	MGM	WLS	Lab	Lab	29,867	53.4%	16,087	79.7%	13,780	29,867	9,812				2,450				55,909
Oldham East	GTM	NW	Lab	Lab	18,248	50.7%	4,632	68.7%	13,616	18,248	4,149								36,013
Oldham West	GTM	NW	Lab	Lab	17,802	52.4%	5,777	72.6%	12,025	17,802	3,604			515					33,946
Orkney and Shetland	HLD	SCT	Lib	Lib	10,950	56.4%	6,810	67.2%	4,140	3,385	10,950	935							19,410
Ormskirk	CHS	NW	Lab	Lab	37,222	50.0%	858	76.1%	36,364	37,222								820	74,406
Orpington	LND	LND	Con	Con	32,150	58.0%	16,076	81.7%	32,150	6,581	16,074			516				146	55,467
Oswestry	SPS	WM	Con	Con	23,551	54.6%	13,401	73.9%	23,551	10,150	9,405								43,106
Oxford	OXF	SE	Lab	Con	27,459	45.3%	1,497	74.2%	27,459	25,962	6,234							959	60,610
Paddington	LND	LND	Con	Con	16,189	45.5%	106	63.3%	16,189	16,083	2,815			402				117	35,606
Paisley	RFW	SCT	Lab	Lab	25,894	55.8%	13,755	72.8%	12,139	25,894		7,305						1,078	46,416
Peckham	LND	LND	Lab	Lab	20,364	59.9%	10,811	57.7%	9,553	20,364	2,607			1,503					32,524
Pembrokeshire	DFD	WLS	Con	Con	30,483	49.2%	7,468	81.3%	30,483	23,015	6,249				1,573			694	62,014
Penistone	SYK	YTH	Lab	Lab	28,010	49.1%	9,701	78.9%	18,309	28,010	10,772								57,091
Penrith and The Border	CMA	NW	Con	Con	26,940	61.2%	17,096	77.0%	26,940	9,844	7,257								44,041
Perth and East Perthshire	PAK	SCT	SNP	Con	20,153	42.0%	3,103	77.3%	20,153	6,432	4,410	17,050							48,045
Peterborough	CAM	E	Lab	Con	27,734	48.8%	5,102	77.9%	27,734	22,632	5,685			672				106	56,829
Petersfield	HAM	SE	Con	Con	39,200	61.2%	22,375	78.3%	39,200	8,082	16,825								64,107
Plymouth Devonport	DEV	SW	Lab	Lab	16,545	47.4%	1,001	72.3%	15,544	16,545	2,360			243				203	34,895
Plymouth Drake	DEV	SW	Con	Con	21,759	50.6%	4,244	77.2%	21,759	17,515	3,452			279					43,005
Plymouth Sutton	DEV	SW	Con	Con	28,892	54.8%	11,287	77.0%	28,892	17,605	6,226								52,723
Pontefract and Castleford	WYK	YTH	Lab	Lab	30,566	68.1%	19,901	73.9%	10,665	30,566	3,616								44,837
Pontypool	GNT	WLS	Lab	Lab	27,751	61.9%	17,368	78.4%	10,383	27,751	5,508				1,169				44,811
Pontypridd	GNT	WLS	Lab	Lab	32,801	56.0%	15,687	78.1%	17,114	32,801	6,228			263	2,200				58,606
Poole	DOR	SW	Con	Con	38,846	57.0%	23,555	78.1%	38,846	15,291	14,001								68,138
Portsmouth North	HAM	SE	Lab	Con	26,356	48.6%	2,311	78.7%	26,356	24,045	3,354			298				122	54,177
Portsmouth South	HAM	SE	Con	Con	26,835	54.7%	11,529	72.9%	26,835	15,306	6,487			457					49,085
Preston North	LAN	NW	Lab	Con	18,632	46.3%	29	77.8%	18,632	18,603	2,715			329					51,756
Preston South	LAN	NW	Lab	Con	17,810	44.5%	621	77.2%	17,189	17,810	4,625			258				116	39,998
Pudsey	WYK	YTH	Con	Con	24,591	45.1%	8,739	80.3%	24,591	13,727	15,852							340	67,853
Putney	LND	LND	Lab	Con	23,040	46.8%	2,630	76.1%	23,040	20,410	5,061			685					49,196
Ravensbourne	LND	LND	Con	Con	22,501	60.9%	15,390	77.6%	22,501	6,848	7,111			478					36,938
Reading North	BRK	SE	Con	Con	25,058	50.6%	7,423	75.9%	25,085	17,662	6,170			554				126	49,597
Reading South	BRK	SE	Con	Con	30,067	53.9%	15,645	76.5%	30,067	14,422	10,642							700	55,831
Redcar	CLV	NE	Lab	Lab	25,470	53.7%	8,053	75.9%	17,417	25,470	4,225							333	47,445
Reigate	SRY	SE	Con	Con	33,767	59.8%	21,313	78.2%	33,767	12,454	10,257								56,478
Rhondda	MGM	WLS	Lab	Lab	38,007	75.2%	31,481	79.8%	6,526	38,007					4,226			1,819	50,578
Richmond	LND	LND	Con	Con	19,294	46.7%	2,530	81.4%	19,294	4,692	16,764			244				349	41,343
Richmond (Yorks)	NYK	YTH	Con	Con	28,958	61.5%	18,994	72.1%	28,958	8,173	9,964								47,095
Ripon	NYK	YTH	Con	Con	25,292	60.3%	16,203	78.8%	25,292	6,749	9,089							781	41,911
Rochdale	GTM	NW	Lib	Lib	22,172	45.0%	5,295	73.7%	9,494	16,878	22,172			690					49,234
Rochester and Chatham	KNT	SE	Lab	Con	27,574	47.5%	2,688	72.7%	27,574	24,886	5,219			417					58,096
Romford	LND	LND	Con	Con	22,714	53.8%	8,812	76.6%	22,714	13,902	4,818			820					42,254
Ross and Cromarty	LND	LND	Con	Con	10,650	42.4%	4,735	76.4%	10,650	5,055	3,496	5,915							25,116
Rossendale	LAN	NW	Lab	Con	20,370	48.0%	1,873	83.8%	20,370	18,497	3,534								42,401
Rother Valley	SYK	YTH	Lab	Lab	45,986	62.2%	26,002	74.6%	19,984	45,986	7,937								73,907
Rotherham	SYK	YTH	Lab	Lab	26,580	60.6%	13,435	72.1%	13,145	26,580	3,686			490					43,901
Roxburgh, Selkirk and Peebles	STB	SCT	Lib	Lib	25,993	53.1%	10,690	82.0%	15,303	4,150	25,993	3,502							48,948
Royal Tunbridge Wells	KNT	SE	Con	Con	31,928	59.5%	20,536	74.7%	31,928	11,392	9,797			509					53,626
Rugby	WAR	WM	Lab	Con	24,417	47.3%	2,729	83.9%	24,417	21,688	4,945			551					51,603
Ruislip-Northwood	LND	LND	Con	Con	26,748	61.3%	17,207	78.6%	26,748	9,541	6,867			477					43,633
Runcorn	CHS	NW	Lab	Con	32,907	51.5%	10,681	77.8%	32,907	22,226	8,783								63,916
Rushcliffe	NTT	EM	Con	Con	34,196	62.2%	22,484	81.7%	34,196	11,712	9,060								54,968
Rutherglen	SLK	SCT	Lab	Lab	18,546	46.7%	8,023	80.4%	10,523	18,546	7,315	3,325							39,709
Rutland and Stamford	LIN	EM	Con	Con	26,198	56.5%	14,815	78.1%	26,198	11,383	8,801								46,382
Rye	LIN	EM	Con	Con	35,516	62.7%	23,078	77.1%	35,516	6,852	12,438			552				1,267	56,625
Saffron Walden	ESS	E	Con	Con	28,563	53.8%	15,363	81.6%	28,563	10,547	13,200			342				425	53,077
Salford East	GTM	NW	Lab	Lab	13,453	63.9%	5,856	64.3%	7,597	13,453									21,050
Salford West	GTM	NW	Lab	Lab	18,411	61.5%	7,254	68.7%	11,157	18,411								383	29,951
Salisbury	WIL	SW	Con	Con	24,962	49.9%	6,244	77.4%	24,962	6,321	18,718								50,001
Scarborough	NYK	YTH	Con	Con	23,669	53.2%	12,325	73.1%	23,669	11,344	9,025							487	44,525
Sevenoaks	KNT	SE	Con	Con	36,697	57.4%	22,114	79.0%	36,697	14,583	11,839			821					63,942
Sheffield Attercliffe	SYK	YTH	Lab	Lab	29,702	64.9%	18,103	72.7%	11,599	29,702	4,017			457					45,775
Sheffield Brightside	SYK	YTH	Lab	Lab	25,672	68.5%	17,693	68.8%	7,979	25,672	3,482			354					37,487
Sheffield Hallam	SYK	YTH	Con	Con	31,436	54.9%	14,934	72.5%	31,436	16,502	8,982			300					57,220
Sheffield Heeley	SYK	YTH	Lab	Lab	24,618	49.8%	4,773	77.3%	19,845	24,618	4,708			274					49,445
Sheffield Hillsborough	SYK	YTH	Lab	Lab	20,556	56.8%	8,350	70.8%	12,206	20,556	3,088			326					36,176
Sheffield Park	SYK	YTH	Lab	Lab	27,483	68.6%	20,324	64.5%	7,159	27,483	4,737			302				390	40,062
Shipley	WYK	YTH	Con	Con	22,641	52.6%	8,360	80.5%	22,641	14,281	5,673							486	43,081
Shoreham	WSX	SE	Con	Con	34,339	60.9%	21,585	78.0%	34,339	8,867	12,754			406					56,366
Shrewsbury	SPS	WM	Con	Con	23,548	48.6%	10,184	76.7%	23,548	11,558	13,364								48,470
Sidcup	LND	LND	Con	Con	23,692	59.8%	13,456	79.3%	23,692	10,236	4,908			774					39,610
Skipton	NYK	YTH	Con	Con	23,177	51.2%	5,693	84.1%	23,177	4,632	17,484								45,293
Solihull	WMD	WM	Con	Con	43,027	66.2%	32,207	77.2%	43,027	10,820	10,214			978					65,039
South Antrim	NIR	NIR	UUP	UUP	50,782	69.0%	38,868	58.2%					50,782			7,432		15,424	73,638
South Ayrshire	EAR	SCT	Lab	Lab	14,271	35.2%	1,521	79.9%	10,287	14,271		3,233						12,750	40,541
South Bedfordshire	BDF	E	Con	Con	32,988	56.4%	16,483	79.9%	32,988	16,505	8,402			626					58,521
South Down	NIR	NIR	UUP	UUP	32,254	50.0%	8,221	72.0%					32,254			24,033		8,189	64,476
South East Derbyshire	DBY	EM	Con	Con	24,004	51.5%	7,387	81.1%	24,004	16,617	5,518			498					46,637
South East Essex	ESS	E	Con	Con	40,497	64.0%	24,532	76.9%	40,497	15,965	6,858								63,320
South Gloucestershire	GLS	SW	Con	Con	35,627	51.2%	15,162	82.1%	35,627	20,465	12,850							695	69,637
South Hertfordshire	HRT	E	Con	Con	27,857	54.1%	11,798	79.0%	27,857	16,059	7,001			605					51,522
South Norfolk	NFK	E	Con	Con	42,792	54.5%	19,037	78.4%	42,792	23,755	11,990								78,537
South Shields	TWR	NE	Lab	Lab	28,675	57.0%	13,124	71.2%	15,551	28,675	6,003								50,229
South West Hertfordshire	HRT	E	Con	Con	33,112	54.7%	16,328	79.7%	33,112	16,784	9,808			839					60,543
South West Norfolk	NFK	E	Con	Con	24,767	54.8%	10,704	78.0%	24,767	14,063	6,363								45,193
South West Staffordshire	STS	WM	Con	Con	32,153	60.4%	17,433	79.0%	32,153	14,720	5,460			912					53,245
South Worcestershire	WOR	WM	Con	Con	34,926	57.1%	20,654	77.3%	34,926	10,206	14,272							1,722	61,126
Southall	LND	LND	Lab	Lab	28,498	54.4%	11,278	71.7%	17,220	28,498	3,920			1,545				1,229	52,412
Southampton Itchen	HAM	SE	Lab	Lab	28,036	46.3%	1,602	74.7%	26,434	28,036	6,132								60,602
Southampton Test	HAM	SE	Lab	Con	27,198	46.4%	2,123	76.3%	27,198	25,075	6,393								58,666
Southend East	ESS	E	Con	Con	22,413	56.1%	10,774	70.1%	22,413	11,639	5,244			676					39,972
Southend West	ESS	E	Con	Con	29,449	57.7%	16,864	76.3%	29,449	8,341	12,585			680					51,055
Southgate	LND	LND	Con	Con	31,663	61.6%	20,079	76.3%	31,663	11,584	7,223			895					51,365
Southport	MSY	NW	Con	Con	25,953	61.6%	20,079	76.3%	25,953	5,725	19,426								51,365
Sowerby	WYK	YTH	Lab	Con	16,797	42.2%	1,180	80.7%	16,797	15,617	7,369								39,783
Spelthorne	SRY	SE	Con	Con	31,290	57.4%	16,153	76.9%	31,290	15,137	7,565			518					54,510
St Albans	HRT	E	Con	Con	31,301	53.1%	17,244	80.4%	31,301	13,638	14,057								58,996
St Helens	LAN	NW	Lab	Lab	32,489	59.6%	15,555	72.8%	16,934	32,489	4,587							471	54,481
St Ives	CUL	SW	Con	Con	22,352	54.0%	13,716	77.0%	22,352	8,636	8,299							2,089	41,376
St Marylebone	LND	LND	Con	Con	14,899	59.9%	8,313	60.8%	14,899	6,586	2,459			239				691	24,874
St Pancras North	LND	LND	Lab	Lab	14,556	54.2%	5,446	63.7%	9,110	14,556	2,654			360				159	26,839
Stafford and Stone	STS	WM	Con	Con	34,387	52.4%	13,177	78.8%	34,387	21,210	10,049								65,646
Stalybridge and Hyde	GTM	NW	Lab	Lab	27,082	51.9%	6,580	77.1%	20,502	27,082	4,642								52,226
Stepney and Poplar	LND	LND	Lab	Lab	19,576	62.6%	13,015	53.3%	6,561	19,576	2,234			1,571				1,320	58,637
Stirling, Falkirk and Grangemouth	SRG	SCT	Lab	Lab	29,499	56.5%	15,618	78.9%	13,881	29,499		8,856							52,236
Stockport North	CHS	NW	Lab	Lab	18,789	44.1%	333	79.5%	18,456	18,789	5,096			244					42,585
Stockport South	CHS	NW	Lab	Lab	16,910	45.1%	1,125	77.4%	15,785	16,910	4,458			374					37,527
Stockton-on-Tees	CLV	NE	Lab	Lab	34,917	53.1%	11,127	73.7%	23,790	34,917	6,074			384				586	65,751
Stoke-on-Trent Central	STS	WM	Lab	Lab	24,707	60.2%	12,603	69.0%	12,104	24,707	4,260								41,073
Stoke-on-Trent North	STS	WM	Lab	Lab	25,652	59.4%	12,424	72.8%	13,228	25,652	3,994			341					43,215
Stoke-on-Trent South	STS	WM	Lab	Lab	31,610	58.8%	14,246	72.5%	17,364	31,610	4,829								53,803
Stratford-on-Avon	WAR	WM	Con	Con	35,470	60.4%	22,554	76.7%	35,470	10,334	12,916								58,720
Stretford	GTM	NW	Con	Con	25,972	48.3%	4,506	77.7%	25,972	21,466	6,369								53,807
Streatham	LND	LND	Con	Con	19,630	51.4%	5,500	71.5%	19,630	14,130	3,779			523				102	38,164
Stroud	GLS	SW	Con	Con	32,534	52.6%	15,497	81.3%	32,534	17,037	12,314								61,885
Sudbury and Woodbridge	SFK	E	Con	Con	39,544	55.0%	20,572	78.7%	39,544	18,972	13,435								71,951
Sunderland North	TWR	NE	Lab	Lab	29,213	57.7%	12,902	69.5%	16,311	29,213	5,238								50,762
Sunderland South	TWR	NE	Lab	Lab	29,403	53.1%	8,401	70.0%	21,002	29,403	4,984								55,389
Surbiton	LND	LND	Con	Con	20,063	56.6%	10,802	75.5%	20,063	9,261	6,093								35,417
Sutton and Cheam	LND	LND	Con	Con	28,842	58.0%	15,706	78.8%	28,842	7,126	13,136			465				128	49,277
Sutton Coldfield	WMD	WM	Con	Con	34,096	68.9%	26,107	77.3%	34,096	6,511	7,989			466				459	49,521
Swansea East	WGM	WLS	Lab	Lab	31,909	69.9%	21,220	75.6%	10,689	31,909					2,732			308	45,638
Swansea West	WGM	WLS	Lab	Lab	24,175	46.1%	401	79.6%	23,774	24,175	3,484				1,012				52,445
Swindon	WIL	SW	Lab	Lab	25,218	50.2%	5,899	76.4%	19,319	25,218	5,709								50,346
Taunton	SOM	SW	Lab	Lab	28,483	53.2%	12,724	80.7%	15,759	28,483	7,928							1,403	53,573
Thanet East	KNT	SE	Con	Con	20,367	57.2%	10,239	72.7%	20,367	10,128	4,755			376					35,625
Thanet West	KNT	SE	Con	Con	18,122	55.4%	9,546	71.6%	18,122	8,576	6,017								32,715
The Wrekin	SPS	WM	Lab	Con	32,672	45.6%	965	78.4%	32,672	31,707	7,331								71,710
Thirsk and Malton	NYK	YTH	Con	Con	32,520	59.2%	20,596	76.5%	32,520	11,924	10,533								54,977
Thornaby	CLV	NE	Lab	Lab	23,597	51.1%	5,524	74.7%	23,790	23,597	4,255			251					46,176
Thurrock	ESS	E	Lab	Lab	33,449	48.6%	6,419	75.1%	27,030	33,449	6,445			1,358				607	68,884
Tiverton	DEV	SW	Con	Con	33,444	56.7%	16,229	79.3%	33,444	8,281	17,215								58,940
Tonbridge and Malling	KNT	SE	Con	Con	29,534	54.5%	16,252	79.5%	29,534	13,282	10,904			429					54,149
Tooting	LND	LND	Lab	Lab	18,642	51.9%	5,200	70.5%	13,442	18,642	2,917			682				233	35,916
Torbay	DEV	SW	Con	Con	36,099	54.1%	20,868	75.1%	36,099	12,919	15,231			647				1,161	66,057
Totnes	DEV	SW	Con	Con	35,010	52.2%	10,565	80.0%	35,010	7,668	24,445								67,123
Tottenham	LND	LND	Lab	Lab	16,299	56.9%	7,133	61.2%	9,166	16,299	2,177			833				165	28,640
Truro	CUL	SW	Lib	Lib	33,571	52.8%	8,708	82.9%	24,863	4,689	33,571			182				227	63,532
Twickenham	LND	LND	Con	Con	30,017	52.2%	12,848	80.3%	30,017	9,591	17,169			686					57,463
Tynemouth	TWR	NE	Con	Con	30,017	51.6%	7,564	77.7%	29,941	22,377	5,736								58,054
Upminster	LND	LND	Con	Con	27,960	52.7%	9,065	80.4%	27,960	18,895	5,216			965					53,036
Uxbridge	LND	LND	Con	Con	20,542	42.1%	2,415	82.5%	20,542	18,127	10,150								48,819
Vauxhall	LND	LND	Lab	Lab	13,058	52.4%	4,700	62.5%	8,358	13,058	1,842			879				762	24,899
Wakefield	WYK	YTH	Lab	Lab	27,124	50.9%	7,553	75.6%	19,571	27,124	6,059			530					53,284
Wallasey	MRY	NW	Con	Con	26,548	49.7%	5,381	77.3%	26,548	21,167	5,269			491					53,475
Wallsend	TWR	NE	Lab	Lab	38,214	55.1%	16,519	75.9%	21,695	38,214	8,514			472				412	69,307
Walsall North	WMD	WM	Lab	Lab	26,913	50.9%	5,866	72.3%	21,047	26,913	3,778			1,098					52,836
Walsall South	WMD	WM	Lab	Lab	22,539	50.9%	1,588	76.7%	20,951	22,539				795					44,285
Walthamstow	LND	LND	Lab	Lab	17,651	50.2%	4,403	71.3%	13,248	17,651	3,117			1,119					35,135
Wanstead and Woodford	LND	LND	Con	Con	26,214	63.6%	17,750	73.7%	26,214	8,464	6,535			957					42,170
Warley East	WMD	WM	Lab	Lab	21,333	55.0%	5,097	70.5%	16,236	21,333				1,204					38,773
Warley West	WMD	WM	Lab	Lab	25,175	58.4%	10,101	70.8%	15,074	25,175	2,864								43,113
Warrington	LAN	NW	Lab	Lab	19,306	61.6%	10,274	71.3%	9,032	19,306	2,883							144	31,365
Warwick and Leamington	WAR	WM	Con	Con	35,925	54.4%	16,558	77.7%	35,925	19,367	9,905							905	66,102
Watford	HRT	E	Lab	Con	21,320	47.6%	3,290	81.3%	21,320	18,030	5,019			388					44,757
Wellingborough	NTH	EM	Con	Con	37,812	52.3%	12,534	81.3%	37,812	25,278	8,506			529				228	72,353
Wells	SOM	SW	Con	Con	30,400	51.4%	12,196	79.2%	30,400	10,025	18,204							576	59,205
Welwyn and Hatfield	HRT	E	Lab	Con	28,892	48.6%	3,474	85.0%	28,892	25,418	4,688			459					59,457
West Bromwich East	WMD	WM	Lab	Lab	19,279	47.0%	1,971	71.1%	17,308	19,279	3,228			1,175					40,990
West Bromwich West	WMD	WM	Lab	Lab	23,791	60.3%	9,468	67.1%	14,323	23,791				1,351					39,465
West Derbyshire	DBY	EM	Con	Con	21,478	52.6%	10,217	80.7%	21,478	8,134	11,261								40,873
West Devon	DEV	SW	Con	Con	29,428	61.0%	17,172	78.6%	29,428	6,174	12,256			393					48,251
West Dunbartonshire	WDB	SCT	Lab	Lab	21,166	48.4%	6,457	80.2%	14,709	21,166		7,835							43,710
West Flintshire	CLY	WLS	Con	Con	26,364	49.0%	9,686	78.6%	26,364	16,678	9,009				1,720				53,771
West Gloucestershire	GLS	SW	Con	Con	28,183	47.9%	4,174	83.9%	28,183	24,009	6,370			270					58,832
West Lothian	WLO	SCT	Lab	Lab	36,713	54.9%	20,082	78.1%	13,162	36,713		16,631						404	66,910
West Renfrewshire	RFW	SCT	Lab	Lab	28,236	44.5%	8,572	81.2%	19,664	28,236	7,256	7,256							63,489
West Stirlingshire	SRG	SCT	Lab	Lab	22,516	47.7%	10,356	82.0%	12,160	22,516	3,905	8,627							47,208
Westbury	WIL	SW	Con	Con	29,929	47.2%	13,979	79.7%	29,929	12,532	15,950							5,006	63,417
Western Isles	WEI	SCT	SNP	SNP	7,941	52.5%	3,063	67.5%	1,600	4,878	700	7,941							15,119
Westhoughton	GTM	NW	Con	Con	29,685	48.2%	5,287	80.1%	24,398	29,685	7,544								61,627
Westmorland	CMA	NW	Con	Con	25,274	56.6%	12,407	74.5%	25,274	6,497	12,867								44,638
Weston-super-Mare	SOM	SW	Con	Con	40,618	56.9%	24,313	77.5%	40,618	14,420	16,305								71,343
Whitehaven	CMA	NW	Lab	Lab	22,626	52.4%	5,455	81.7%	17,171	22,626	2,559							790	43,146
Widnes	LAN	NW	Lab	Lab	32,033	55.2%	10,281	74.2%	21,752	32,033	4,290								58,075
Wigan	GTM	NW	Lab	Lab	26,144	59.8%	12,995	74.1%	13,149	26,144	4,102							348	43,742
Wimbledon	LND	LND	Con	Con	27,567	55.1%	13,315	76.4%	27,567	14,252	7,604			612					50,035
Winchester	HAM	SE	Con	Con	38,198	56.0%	22,820	78.0%	38,198	15,378	14,228							395	68,199
Windsor and Maidenhead	BRK	SE	Con	Con	38,451	59.7%	25,130	75.4%	38,451	13,321	11,496			930				251	64,449
Wirral	CHS	NW	Spkr	Con	44,519	59.0%	23,331	77.8%	38,198	21,188	9,769								75,476
Woking	SRY	SE	Con	Con	31,719	57.1%	18,392	76.5%	31,719	13,327	9,991			564					55,601
Wokingham	BRK	SE	Con	Con	36,194	54.4%	18,746	78.2%	36,194	17,448	12,120			722					65,762
Wolverhampton North East	WMD	WM	Lab	Lab	24,046	50.0%	6,060	70.7%	17,986	24,046	4,760			1,283					48,075
Wolverhampton South East	WMD	WM	Lab	Lab	20,798	55.7%	7,901	69.1%	12,807	20,798	2,499			1,139					37,153
Wolverhampton South West	WMD	WM	Con	Con	26,587	52.4%	10,760	76.6%	26,587	15,827	6,939			912				401	50,666
Wood Green	LND	LND	Lab	Lab	16,465	46.9%	2,515	67.4%	13,950	16,465	3,665			998					35,079
Woolwich East	LND	LND	Lab	Lab	21,700	58.9%	10,460	70.1%	11,240	21,700	2,998			884					36,822
Woolwich West	LND	LND	Lab	Con	21,222	47.3%	2,609	79.6%	21,222	18,613	4,363			630					44,828
Worcester	WOR	WM	Con	Con	30,194	51.3%	11,589	79.6%	30,194	18,605	8,886			450				707	58,842
Workington	CMA	NW	Lab	Lab	24,523	53.2%	5,756	83.8%	18,767	24,523	2,819								46,109
Worthing	WSX	SE	Con	Con	33,624	61.2%	20,380	73.3%	33,624	7,163	13,244			893					54,924
Wrexham	CLY	WLS	Lab	Lab	30,405	49.2%	12,149	78.4%	18,256	30,405	11,389				1,740				56,514
Wycombe	BKM	SE	Con	Con	38,171	57.3%	20,171	77.6%	38,171	18,000	9,615			833					66,619
Yarmouth	NFK	E	Con	Con	28,066	50.4%	7,228	77.1%	28,066	20,838	6,112			640					55,656
Yeovil	SOM	SW	Con	Con	31,321	47.9%	11,382	82.1%	31,321	14,098	19,939								65,358
York	NYK	YTH	Lab	Lab	26,703	44.7%	1,250	77.7%	25,453	26,703	6,752			221				569	59,698
Total for all constituencies								76.0%	13,697,923	11,532,218	4,313,804	504,259	254,578	191,719	132,544	126,325	70,795	397,197	31,221,362
Total for all constituencies								76.0%	43.9%	36.9%	13.8%	1.7%	0.8%	0.6%	0.4%	0.4%	0.2%	1.3%	100.0%
Total for all constituencies								76.0%	Seats										
Total for all constituencies								76.0%	339	268	11	2	5	0	2	1	3	4	635
Total for all constituencies								76.0%	53.4%	42.2%	1.7%	0.3%	0.8%	0.0%	0.3%	0.2%	0.5%	0.6%	100.0%

== See also ==
- 1979 United Kingdom general election
- List of MPs elected in the 1979 United Kingdom general election
