= List of MPs elected in the 1979 United Kingdom general election =

1979–1983 Parliament of the United Kingdom
←	October 1974–1979 Parliament	1983–1987 Parliament	→
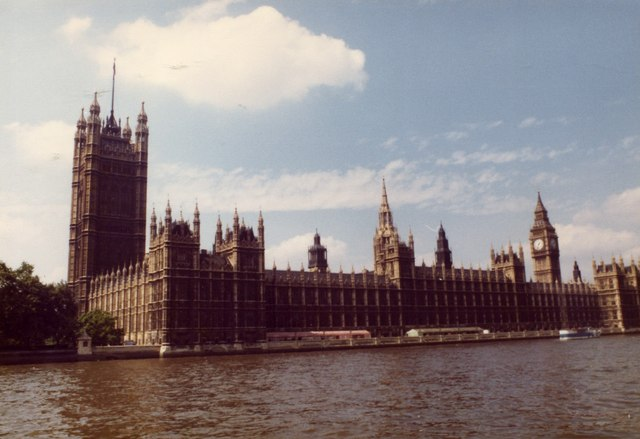
- Palace of Westminster in 1981

Overview
- Legislative body: Parliament of the United Kingdom
- Term: 3 June 1979 – 9 June 1983
- Election: 1979 United Kingdom general election
- Government: First Thatcher ministry

House of Commons
- Members: 635
- Speaker: George Thomas
- Leader: Norman St John-Stevas; Francis Pym; John Biffen
- Prime Minister: Margaret Thatcher
- Leader of the Opposition: James Callaghan; Michael Foot
- Third-party leader: David Steel

House of Lords
- Lord Chancellor: Baron Hailsham of St Marylebone

Crown-in-Parliament Elizabeth II

Sessions
- 1st: 9 May 1979 – 13 November 1980
- 2nd: 20 November 1980 – 30 October 1981
- 3rd: 4 November 1981 – 28 October 1982
- 4th: 3 November 1982 – 13 May 1983

This is a list of members of Parliament (MPs) elected in the 1979 general election, held on 3 May. This Parliament was dissolved in 1983.

Parliament, which consists of the House of Lords and the elected House of Commons, was convened on Tuesday 15 May 1979 at the Palace of Westminster by Queen Elizabeth II.

This map shows by geography the colours each of the 635 constituencies of the 1979–1983 Parliament.

Of the 77 newcomers, two were women (Sheila Faith and Sheila Wright). In total, the Parliament had 19 female members (8 Conservative, 11 Labour), fewer than any post-war parliament before or since, with the sole exception of 1951.

It was the election from which Margaret Thatcher, the incumbent Conservative Party leader became Prime Minister, the first female head of government in the United Kingdom and Europe.

== Composition ==
These representative diagrams show the composition of the parties in the 1979 general election.

Note: The Scottish National Party and Plaid Cymru sit together as a party group. This is not the official seating plan of the House of Commons, which has five rows of benches on each side, with the government party to the right of the speaker and opposition parties to the left, but with room for only around two-thirds of MPs to sit at any one time.

Affiliation	Members
Conservative Party	339
Labour Party	269
Liberal Party	11
Ulster Unionist Party	5
Democratic Unionist Party	3
Plaid Cymru	2
Scottish National Party	2
Independent Republican	1
Independent Ulster Unionist	1
Social Democratic and Labour Party	1
United Ulster Unionist Party	1
Total	635
Notional government majority	43
Effective government majority	50

Table of contents:

A B C D E F G H I J K L M N O P Q R S T U V W X Y Z By-elections

=== A ===
Constituency	MP	Party
Aberavon	John Morris	Labour
Aberdare	Ioan Evans	Labour Co-operative
Aberdeen, North	Robert Hughes	Labour
Aberdeen, South	Iain Sproat	Conservative
Aberdeenshire, East	Albert McQuarrie	Conservative
Aberdeenshire, West	Russell Fairgrieve	Conservative
Abertillery	Jeffrey Thomas	Labour, then SDP
Abingdon	Thomas Benyon	Conservative
Accrington	Arthur Davidson	Labour
Acton	Sir George Young, Bt	Conservative
Aldershot	Julian Critchley	Conservative
Aldridge-Brownhills	Richard Shepherd	Conservative
Altrincham and Sale	Fergus Montgomery	Conservative
Anglesey	Keith Best	Conservative
Angus, North, and Mearns	Alick Buchanan-Smith	Conservative
Angus, South	Peter Fraser	Conservative
Antrim, North	Rev. Ian Paisley	Democratic Unionist
Antrim, South	James Molyneaux	Official Unionist
Argyll	John MacKay	Conservative
Armagh	Harold McCusker	Official Unionist
Arundel	Michael Marshall	Conservative
Ashfield	Frank Haynes	Labour
Ashford	Keith Speed	Conservative
Ashton-under-Lyne	Robert Sheldon	Labour
Aylesbury	Timothy Raison	Conservative
Ayr	Hon. George Younger	Conservative
Ayrshire, Central	David Lambie	Labour
Ayrshire, North, and Bute	John Alexander Corrie	Conservative
Ayrshire, South	George Foulkes	Labour Co-operative
=== B ===
Banbury	Neil Marten	Conservative
Banff	David Myles	Conservative
Barking, Barking	Josephine Richardson	Labour
Barking, Dagenham	John Parker	Labour
Barkston Ash	Michael Alison	Conservative
Barnet, Chipping Barnet	Sydney Chapman	Conservative
Barnet, Finchley	Margaret Thatcher	Conservative
Barnet, Hendon, North	John Gorst	Conservative
Barnet, Hendon, South	Peter Thomas	Conservative
Barnsley	Roy Mason	Labour
Barrow-in-Furness	Albert Booth	Labour
Barry	Sir Raymond Gower	Conservative
Basildon	Harvey Proctor	Conservative
Basingstoke	David Mitchell	Conservative
Bassetlaw	Joseph Ashton	Labour
Bath	Chris Patten	Conservative
Batley and Morley	Kenneth Woolmer	Labour
Beaconsfield	Ronald Bell	Conservative
Bebington and Ellesmere Port	Barry Porter	Conservative
Bedford	Trevor Skeet	Conservative
Bedfordshire, Mid	Stephen Hastings	Conservative
Bedfordshire, South	David Madel	Conservative
Bedwellty	Neil Kinnock	Labour
Beeston	James Lester	Conservative
Belfast, East	Peter Robinson	Democratic Unionist
Belfast, North	John McQuade	Democratic Unionist
Belfast, South	Rev. Robert Bradford	Official Unionist
Belfast, West	Gerard "Gerry" Fitt	Social Democratic and Labour
Belper	Sheila Faith	Conservative
Berwick and East Lothian	John Robertson	Labour
Berwick-upon-Tweed	Alan Beith	Liberal
Bexley, Bexleyheath	Cyril Townsend	Conservative
Bexley, Erith and Crayford	James Wellbeloved	Labour, then SDP
Bexley, Sidcup	Edward Heath	Conservative
Birkenhead	Frank Field	Labour
Birmingham, Edgbaston	Jill Knight	Conservative
Birmingham, Erdington	Julius Silverman	Labour
Birmingham, Hall Green	Reginald Eyre	Conservative
Birmingham, Handsworth	Sheila Wright	Labour
Birmingham, Ladywood	John Sever	Labour
Birmingham, Northfield	Jocelyn Cadbury	Conservative
Birmingham, Perry Barr	Jeff Rooker	Labour
Birmingham, Selly Oak	Anthony Beaumont-Dark	Conservative
Birmingham, Small Heath	Denis Howell	Labour
Birmingham, Sparkbrook	Roy Hattersley	Labour
Birmingham, Stechford	Terence Davis	Labour
Birmingham, Yardley	David Gilroy Bevan	Conservative
Bishop Auckland	Derek Foster	Labour
Blaby	Nigel Lawson	Conservative
Blackburn	Jack Straw	Labour
Blackpool, North	Norman Miscampbell	Conservative
Blackpool, South	Peter Blaker	Conservative
Blaydon	John McWilliam	Labour
Blyth	John Ryman	Labour
Bodmin	Robert Hicks	Conservative
Bolsover	Dennis Skinner	Labour
Bolton, East	David Young	Labour
Bolton, West	Ann Taylor	Labour
Bootle	Allan Roberts	Labour
Bosworth	Hon. Adam Butler	Conservative
Bothwell	James Hamilton	Labour
Bournemouth, East	David Atkinson	Conservative
Bournemouth, West	Sir John Eden, Bt	Conservative
Bradford, North	Benjamin Ford	Labour
Bradford, South	Thomas Torney	Labour
Bradford, West	Edward Lyons	Labour, then SDP
Braintree	Anthony Newton	Conservative
Brecon and Radnor	Tom Hooson	Conservative
Brent, East	Reginald Freeson	Labour
Brent, North	Rhodes Boyson	Conservative
Brent, South	Laurence Pavitt	Labour Co-operative
Brentwood and Ongar	Robert McCrindle	Conservative
Bridgwater	Tom King	Conservative
Bridlington	John Townend	Conservative
Brigg and Scunthorpe	Michael Brown	Conservative
Brighouse and Spenborough	Gary Waller	Conservative
Brighton, Kemptown	Andrew Bowden	Conservative
Brighton, Pavilion	Julian Amery	Conservative
Bristol, North East	Arthur Palmer	Labour Co-operative
Bristol, North West	Michael Colvin	Conservative
Bristol, South	Michael Cocks	Labour
Bristol, South East	Tony Benn	Labour
Bristol, West	Hon. William Waldegrave	Conservative
Bromley, Beckenham	Philip Goodhart	Conservative
Bromley, Chislehurst	Roger Sims	Conservative
Bromley, Orpington	Ivor Stanbrook	Conservative
Bromley, Ravensbourne	John Hunt	Conservative
Bromsgrove and Redditch	Hal Miller	Conservative
Buckingham	William Benyon	Conservative
Burnley	Dan Jones	Labour
Burton	Ivan Lawrence	Conservative
Bury and Radcliffe	Frank White	Labour
Bury St Edmunds	Eldon Griffiths	Conservative
=== C ===
Caernarfon	Dafydd Wigley	Plaid Cymru
Caerphilly	Ednyfed Hudson Davies	Labour, then SDP
Caithness and Sutherland	Robert Maclennan	Labour, then SDP
Cambridge	Robert Rhodes James	Conservative
Cambridgeshire	Francis Pym	Conservative
Camden, Hampstead	Geoffrey Finsberg	Conservative
Camden, Holborn and St Pancras South	Frank Dobson	Labour
Camden, St Pancras, North	Albert Stallard	Labour
Cannock	Gwilym Roberts	Labour
Canterbury	David Crouch	Conservative
Cardiff, North	Ian Grist	Conservative
Cardiff, North West	Michael Roberts	Conservative
Cardiff, South East	James Callaghan	Labour
Cardiff, West	George Thomas	Labour
Cardigan	Geraint Howells	Liberal
Carlisle	Ronald Lewis	Labour
Carlton	Philip Holland	Conservative
Carmarthen	Roger Thomas	Labour
Cheadle	Tom Normanton	Conservative
Chelmsford	Norman St John-Stevas	Conservative
Cheltenham	Charles Irving	Conservative
Chertsey and Walton	Geoffrey Pattie	Conservative
Chesham and Amersham	Sir Ian Gilmour, Bt	Conservative
Chester	Hon. Peter Morrison	Conservative
Chesterfield	Eric Varley	Labour
Chester-le-Street	Giles Radice	Labour
Chichester	Anthony Nelson	Conservative
Chippenham	Richard Needham	Conservative
Chorley	Den Dover	Conservative
Christchurch and Lymington	Robert Adley	Conservative
Cirencester and Tewkesbury	Hon. Nicholas Ridley	Conservative
City of London and Westminster, South	Hon. Peter Brooke	Conservative
City of Westminster, Paddington	John Wheeler	Conservative
City of Westminster, St Marylebone	Kenneth Baker	Conservative
Cleveland and Whitby	Leon Brittan	Conservative
Clitheroe	David Waddington	Conservative
Coatbridge and Airdrie	James Dempsey	Labour
Colchester	Antony Buck	Conservative
Colne Valley	Richard Wainwright	Liberal
Consett	David Watkins	Labour
Conway	Wyn Roberts	Conservative
Cornwall, North	Gerrard Neale	Conservative
Coventry, North East	George Park	Labour
Coventry, North West	Geoffrey Robinson	Labour
Coventry, South East	William Wilson	Labour
Coventry, South West	John Butcher	Conservative
Crewe	Gwyneth Dunwoody	Labour
Crosby	Graham Page	Conservative
Croydon, Central	John Moore	Conservative
Croydon, North East	Bernard Weatherill	Conservative
Croydon, North West	Robert Taylor	Conservative
Croydon, South	William Clark	Conservative
=== D ===
Darlington	Edward Fletcher	Labour
Dartford	Bob Dunn	Conservative
Darwen	Charles Fletcher-Cooke	Conservative
Daventry	Reginald Prentice	Conservative
Dearne Valley	Edwin Wainwright	Labour
Denbigh	Geraint Morgan	Conservative
Derby, North	Phillip Whitehead	Labour
Derby, South	Walter Johnson	Labour
Derbyshire, North East	Raymond Ellis	Labour
Derbyshire, South East	Peter Rost	Conservative
Derbyshire, West	Matthew Parris	Conservative
Devizes	Hon. Charles Morrison	Conservative
Devon, North	Antony Speller	Conservative
Devon, West	Peter Mills	Conservative
Dewsbury	David Ginsburg	Labour, then SDP
Doncaster	Harold Walker	Labour
Don Valley	Michael Welsh	Labour
Dorking	Keith Wickenden	Conservative
Dorset, North	Nicholas Baker	Conservative
Dorset, South	Viscount Cranborne	Conservative
Dorset, West	James Spicer	Conservative
Dover and Deal	Peter Rees	Conservative
Down, North	James Kilfedder	Independent Ulster Unionist
Down, South	Enoch Powell	Official Unionist
Dudley, East	John Gilbert	Labour
Dudley, West	John Blackburn	Conservative
Dumfries	Hector Monro	Conservative
Dunbartonshire, Central	Hugh McCartney	Labour
Dunbartonshire, East	Norman Hogg	Labour
Dunbartonshire, West	Ian Campbell	Labour
Dundee, East	Gordon Wilson	Scottish National Party
Dundee, West	Ernie Ross	Labour
Dunfermline	Richard Douglas	Labour Co-operative
Durham	Mark Hughes	Labour
Durham, North West	Ernest Armstrong	Labour
=== E ===
Ealing, North	Harry Greenway	Conservative
Ealing, Southall	Sydney Bidwell	Labour
Easington	Jack Dormand	Labour
Eastbourne	Ian Gow	Conservative
East Grinstead	Geoffrey Johnson-Smith	Conservative
East Kilbride	Dr Maurice Miller	Labour
Eastleigh	David Price	Conservative
Ebbw Vale	Michael Foot	Labour
Eccles	Lewis Carter-Jones	Labour
Edinburgh, Central	Robin Cook	Labour
Edinburgh, East	Gavin Strang	Labour
Edinburgh, Leith	Ronald Brown	Labour
Edinburgh, North	Alex Fletcher	Conservative
Edinburgh, Pentlands	Malcolm Rifkind	Conservative
Edinburgh, South	Michael Ancram	Conservative
Edinburgh, West	Lord James Douglas-Hamilton	Conservative
Enfield, Edmonton	Edward Graham	Labour Co-operative
Enfield, North	Timothy Eggar	Conservative
Enfield, Southgate	Hon. Anthony Berry	Conservative
Epping Forest	John Biggs-Davison	Conservative
Epsom & Ewell	Hon. Archie Hamilton	Conservative
Esher	Carol Mather	Conservative
Essex, South East	Sir Bernard Braine	Conservative
Eton and Slough	Joan Lestor	Labour
Exeter	John Hannam	Conservative
Eye	John Gummer	Conservative
=== F ===
Falmouth and Camborne	David Mudd	Conservative
Fareham	Peter Lloyd	Conservative
Farnham	Maurice Macmillan	Conservative
Farnworth	John Roper	Labour Co-operative, then SDP
Faversham	Roger Moate	Conservative
Fermanagh & South Tyrone	Frank Maguire	Independent Republican
Fife, Central	Willie Hamilton	Labour
Fife, East	Barry Henderson	Conservative
Flint, East	Barry Jones	Labour
Flint, West	Sir Anthony Meyer, Bt	Conservative
Folkestone and Hythe	Albert Costain	Conservative
=== G ===
Gainsborough	Marcus Kimball	Conservative
Galloway	Ian Lang	Conservative
Gateshead, East	Bernard Conlan	Labour
Gateshead, West	John Horam	Labour, then SDP
Gillingham	Frederick Burden	Conservative
Glasgow, Cathcart	John Maxton	Labour
Glasgow, Central	Thomas McMillan	Labour
Glasgow, Craigton	Bruce Millan	Labour
Glasgow, Garscadden	Donald Dewar	Labour
Glasgow, Govan	Andrew McMahon	Labour
Glasgow, Hillhead	Thomas Galbraith	Conservative
Glasgow, Kelvingrove	Neil Carmichael	Labour
Glasgow, Maryhill	James Craigen	Labour Co-operative
Glasgow, Pollok	James White	Labour
Glasgow, Provan	Hugh Brown	Labour
Glasgow, Queen's Park	Frank McElhone	Labour
Glasgow, Shettleston	David Marshall	Labour
Glasgow, Springburn	Michael Martin	Labour
Gloucester	Sally Oppenheim	Conservative
Gloucestershire, South	John Cope	Conservative
Gloucestershire, West	Paul Marland	Conservative
Goole	Edmund Marshall	Labour
Gosport	Peter Viggers	Conservative
Gower	Ifor Davies	Labour
Grantham	Hon. Douglas Hogg	Conservative
Gravesend	Timothy Brinton	Conservative
Greenock and Port Glasgow	Dickson Mabon	Labour Co-operative, then SDP
Greenwich, Greenwich	Guy Barnett	Labour
Greenwich, Woolwich, East	John Cartwright	Labour, then SDP
Greenwich, Woolwich, West	Peter Bottomley	Conservative
Grimsby	Austin Mitchell	Labour
Guildford	David Howell	Conservative
=== H ===
Hackney, Central	Stanley Clinton-Davis	Labour
Hackney, North and Stoke Newington	Ernest Roberts	Labour
Hackney, South and Shoreditch	Ronald Brown	Labour, then SDP
Halesowen and Stourbridge	John Stokes	Conservative
Halifax	Shirley Summerskill	Labour
Haltemprice	Patrick Wall	Conservative
Hamilton	George Robertson	Labour
Hammersmith, Fulham	Martin Stevens	Conservative
Hammersmith, North	Clive Soley	Labour
Harborough	John Farr	Conservative
Haringey, Hornsey	Hugh Rossi	Conservative
Haringey, Tottenham	Norman Atkinson	Labour
Haringey, Wood Green	Reg Race	Labour
Harlow	Stanley Newens	Labour Co-operative
Harrogate	Robert Banks	Conservative
Harrow, Central	Anthony Grant	Conservative
Harrow, East	Hugh Dykes	Conservative
Harrow, West	John Page	Conservative
Hartlepool	Edward Leadbitter	Labour
Harwich	Julian Ridsdale	Conservative
Hastings	Kenneth Warren	Conservative
Havant and Waterloo	Ian Lloyd	Conservative
Havering, Hornchurch	Robin Squire	Conservative
Havering, Romford	Michael Neubert	Conservative
Havering, Upminster	John Loveridge	Conservative
Hazel Grove	Tom Arnold	Conservative
Hemel Hempstead	Nicholas Lyell	Conservative
Hemsworth	Alec Woodall	Labour
Henley	Michael Heseltine	Conservative
Hereford	Colin Shepherd	Conservative
Hertford and Stevenage	Bowen Wells	Conservative
Hertfordshire, East	Sir Derek Walker-Smith, Bt	Conservative
Hertfordshire, South	Cecil Parkinson	Conservative
Hertfordshire, South West	Geoffrey Dodsworth	Conservative
Hexham	Geoffrey Rippon	Conservative
Heywood and Royton	Joel Barnett	Labour
High Peak	Spencer Le Marchant	Conservative
Hillingdon, Hayes and Harlington	Neville Sandelson	Labour, then SDP
Hillingdon, Ruislip-Northwood	John Wilkinson	Conservative
Hillingdon, Uxbridge	Michael Shersby	Conservative
Hitchin	Ian Stewart	Conservative
Holland with Boston	Richard Body	Conservative
Honiton	Peter Emery	Conservative
Horncastle	Peter Tapsell	Conservative
Horsham and Crawley	Peter Hordern	Conservative
Houghton-le-Spring	Thomas Urwin	Labour
Hounslow, Brentford and Isleworth	Barney Hayhoe	Conservative
Hounslow, Feltham and Heston	Russell Kerr	Labour
Hove	Hon. Tim Sainsbury	Conservative
Howden	Sir Paul Bryan	Conservative
Huddersfield, East	Barry Sheerman	Labour Co-operative
Huddersfield, West	Geoffrey Dickens	Conservative
Huntingdonshire	John Major	Conservative
Huyton	Sir Harold Wilson	Labour
=== I ===
Ilkeston	Raymond Fletcher	Labour
Ince	Michael McGuire	Labour
Inverness	Russell Johnston	Liberal
Ipswich	Kenneth Weetch	Labour
Isle of Ely	Clement Freud	Liberal
Isle of Wight	Stephen Ross	Liberal
Islington, Central	John Grant	Labour, then SDP
Islington, North	Michael O'Halloran	Labour, then SDP, then Independent Labour
Islington, South and Finsbury	George Cunningham	Labour, then SDP
=== J ===
Jarrow	Donald Dixon	Labour
=== K ===
Keighley	Robert Cryer	Labour
Kensington and Chelsea, Chelsea	Nicholas Scott	Conservative
Kensington and Chelsea, Kensington	Sir Brandon Rhys-Williams, Bt	Conservative
Kettering	William Homewood	Labour
Kidderminster	Esmond Bulmer	Conservative
Kilmarnock	William McKelvey	Labour
Kingston upon Hull Central	Kevin McNamara	Labour
Kingston upon Hull East	John Prescott	Labour
Kingston upon Hull West	James Johnson	Labour
Kingston upon Thames	Norman Lamont	Conservative
Kingswood	Jack Aspinwall	Conservative
Kinross and West Perthshire	Nicholas Fairbairn	Conservative
Kirkcaldy	Harry Gourlay	Labour
Knutsford	Jock Bruce-Gardyne	Conservative
=== L ===
Lambeth, Central	John Tilley	Labour Co-operative
Lambeth, Norwood	John Fraser	Labour
Lambeth, Streatham	William Shelton	Conservative
Lambeth, Vauxhall	Stuart Holland	Labour
Lanark	Judith Hart	Labour
Lanarkshire, North	John Smith	Labour
Lancaster	Elaine Kellett-Bowman	Conservative
Leeds, East	Denis Healey	Labour
Leeds, North East	Sir Keith Joseph, Bt	Conservative
Leeds, North West	Sir Donald Kaberry, Bt	Conservative
Leeds, South	Merlyn Rees	Labour
Leeds, South East	Stanley Cohen	Labour
Leeds, West	Joseph Dean	Labour
Leek	David Knox	Conservative
Leicester, East	Tom Bradley	Labour, then SDP
Leicester South	Jim Marshall	Labour
Leicester, West	Greville Janner	Labour
Leigh	Lawrence Cunliffe	Labour
Leominster	Peter Temple-Morris	Conservative
Lewes	Tim Rathbone	Conservative
Lewisham Deptford	Hon. John Silkin	Labour
Lewisham, East	Roland Moyle	Labour
Lewisham, West	Christopher Price	Labour
Lichfield and Tamworth	John Heddle	Conservative
Lincoln	Kenneth Carlisle	Conservative
Liverpool, Edge Hill	David Alton	Liberal
Liverpool, Garston	Malcolm Thornton	Conservative
Liverpool, Kirkdale	James Dunn	Labour, then SDP
Liverpool, Scotland Exchange	Robert Parry	Labour
Liverpool, Toxteth	Richard Crawshaw	Labour, then SDP
Liverpool, Walton	Eric Heffer	Labour
Liverpool, Wavertree	Anthony Steen	Conservative
Liverpool, West Derby	Eric Ogden	Labour, then SDP
Llanelli	Denzil Davies	Labour
Londonderry	William Ross	Official Unionist
Loughborough	Stephen Dorrell	Conservative
Louth	Michael Brotherton	Conservative
Lowestoft	James Prior	Conservative
Ludlow	Eric Cockeram	Conservative
Luton, East	Graham Bright	Conservative
Luton, West	John Russell Carlisle	Conservative
=== M ===
Macclesfield	Nicholas Winterton	Conservative
Maidstone	John Wells	Conservative
Maldon	John Wakeham	Conservative
Manchester, Ardwick	Gerald Kaufman	Labour
Manchester, Blackley	Kenneth Eastham	Labour
Manchester, Central	Harold Lever	Labour
Manchester, Gorton	Kenneth Marks	Labour
Manchester, Moss Side	George Morton	Labour
Manchester, Openshaw	Charles Morris	Labour
Manchester, Withington	Frederick Silvester	Conservative
Manchester, Wythenshawe	Alfred Morris	Labour Co-operative
Mansfield	Don Concannon	Labour
Melton	Michael Latham	Conservative
Meriden	Iain Mills	Conservative
Merioneth	Dafydd Thomas	Plaid Cymru
Merthyr Tydfil	Edward Rowlands	Labour
Merton, Mitcham and Morden	Bruce Douglas-Mann	Labour, then Ind SDP
Merton, Wimbledon	Sir Michael Havers	Conservative
Middleton and Prestwich	James Callaghan	Labour
Midlothian	Alexander Eadie	Labour
Monmouth	John Stradling Thomas	Conservative
Montgomery	Delwyn Williams	Conservative
Moray and Nairn	Alexander Pollock	Conservative
Morecambe and Lonsdale	Hon. Mark Lennox-Boyd	Conservative
Morpeth	George Grant	Labour
Motherwell and Wishaw	Jeremy Bray	Labour
=== N ===
Nantwich	Sir Nicholas Bonsor, Bt	Conservative
Neath	Donald Coleman	Labour
Nelson and Colne	John Lee	Conservative
Newark	Richard Alexander	Conservative
Newbury	Michael McNair-Wilson	Conservative
Newcastle-under-Lyme	John Golding	Labour
Newcastle upon Tyne, Central	Harry Cowans	Labour
Newcastle upon Tyne, East	Mike Thomas	Labour Co-operative, then SDP
Newcastle upon Tyne, North	Sir William Elliott	Conservative
Newcastle upon Tyne, West	Robert Brown	Labour
New Forest	Patrick McNair-Wilson	Conservative
Newham, North East	Ronald Leighton	Labour
Newham, North West	Arthur Lewis	Labour
Newham, South	Nigel Spearing	Labour
Newport	Roy Hughes	Labour
Newton	John Evans	Labour
Norfolk North	Ralph Howell	Conservative
Norfolk, North West	Christopher Brocklebank-Fowler	Conservative, then SDP
Norfolk, South	John MacGregor	Conservative
Norfolk, South West	Sir Paul Hawkins	Conservative
Normanton	Albert Roberts	Labour
Northampton, North	Antony Marlow	Conservative
Northampton, South	Michael Morris	Conservative
North Fylde	Walter Clegg	Conservative
Northwich	Alastair Goodlad	Conservative
Norwich, North	David Ennals	Labour
Norwich, South	John Garrett	Labour
Nottingham, East	Jack Dunnett	Labour
Nottingham, North	William Whitlock	Labour
Nottingham, West	Michael English	Labour
Nuneaton	Leslie Huckfield	Labour
=== O ===
Ogmore	Raymond Powell	Labour
Oldham, East	James Lamond	Labour
Oldham, West	Michael Meacher	Labour
Orkney and Shetland	Jo Grimond	Liberal
Ormskirk	Robert Kilroy-Silk	Labour
Oswestry	John Biffen	Conservative
Oxford	John Patten	Conservative
Oxfordshire, Mid	Hon. Douglas Hurd	Conservative
=== P ===
Paisley	Allen Adams	Labour
Pembrokeshire	Nicholas Edwards	Conservative
Penistone	Allen McKay	Labour
Penrith and The Border	William Whitelaw	Conservative
Perth and East Perthshire	Bill Walker	Conservative
Peterborough	Brian Mawhinney	Conservative
Petersfield	Lt.-Col. Michael Mates	Conservative
Plymouth, Devonport	David Owen	Labour, then SDP
Plymouth, Drake	Janet Fookes	Conservative
Plymouth, Sutton	Alan Clark	Conservative
Pontefract and Castleford	Geoffrey Lofthouse	Labour
Pontypool	Leo Abse	Labour
Pontypridd	Brynmor John	Labour
Poole	John Ward	Conservative
Portsmouth, North	Peter Griffiths	Conservative
Portsmouth, South	Bonner Pink	Conservative
Preston, North	Robert Atkins	Conservative
Preston, South	Stanley Thorne	Labour
Pudsey	Giles Shaw	Conservative
=== R ===
Reading, North	Anthony Durant	Conservative
Reading, South	Gerard Vaughan	Conservative
Redbridge, Ilford, North	Vivian Bendall	Conservative
Redbridge, Ilford, South	Neil Thorne	Conservative
Redbridge, Wanstead and Woodford	Patrick Jenkin	Conservative
Reigate	George Gardiner	Conservative
Renfrewshire, East	Allan Stewart	Conservative
Renfrewshire, West	Norman Buchan	Labour
Rhondda	Alec Jones	Labour
Richmond upon Thames, Richmond	Sir Anthony Royle	Conservative
Richmond upon Thames, Twickenham	Toby Jessel	Conservative
Richmond (Yorkshire)	Sir Timothy Kitson	Conservative
Ripon	Keith Hampson	Conservative
Rochdale	Cyril Smith	Liberal
Rochester and Chatham	Peggy Fenner	Conservative
Ross and Cromarty	Hamish Gray	Conservative
Rossendale	David Trippier	Conservative
Rotherham	Stanley Crowther	Labour
Rother Valley	Peter Hardy	Labour
Roxburgh, Selkirk and Peebles	David Steel	Liberal
Royal Tunbridge Wells	Patrick Mayhew	Conservative
Rugby	Jim Pawsey	Conservative
Runcorn	Mark Carlisle	Conservative
Rushcliffe	Kenneth Clarke	Conservative
Rutherglen	Gregor Mackenzie	Labour
Rutland and Stamford	Kenneth Lewis	Conservative
Rye	Godman Irvine	Conservative
=== S ===
Saffron Walden	Alan Haselhurst	Conservative
St Albans	Victor Goodhew	Conservative
St Helens	Leslie Spriggs	Labour
St Ives	John Nott	Conservative
Salford, East	Frank Allaun	Labour
Salford, West	Stanley Orme	Labour
Salisbury	Michael Hamilton	Conservative
Scarborough	Michael Shaw	Conservative
Sevenoaks	Mark Wolfson	Conservative
Sheffield, Attercliffe	Patrick Duffy	Labour
Sheffield, Brightside	Joan Maynard	Labour
Sheffield, Hallam	John Osborn	Conservative
Sheffield, Heeley	Frank Hooley	Labour
Sheffield, Hillsborough	Martin Flannery	Labour
Sheffield, Park	Frederick Mulley	Labour
Shipley	Marcus Fox	Conservative
Shoreham	Richard Luce	Conservative
Shrewsbury	Sir John Langford-Holt	Conservative
Skipton	John Watson	Conservative
Solihull	Percy Grieve	Conservative
Somerset, North	Paul Dean	Conservative
Southampton, Itchen	Bob Mitchell	Labour, then SDP
Southampton, Test	James Hill	Conservative
Southend, East	Sir Stephen McAdden	Conservative
Southend, West	Paul Channon	Conservative
South Fylde	Edward Gardner	Conservative
Southport	Ian Percival	Conservative
South Shields	David G. Clark	Labour
Southwark, Bermondsey	Robert Mellish	Labour
Southwark, Dulwich	Hon. Samuel Silkin	Labour
Southwark, Peckham	Harry Lamborn	Labour
Sowerby	Donald Thompson	Conservative
Spelthorne	Humphrey Atkins	Conservative
Stafford and Stone	Hon. Hugh Fraser	Conservative
Staffordshire, South West	Patrick Cormack	Conservative
Stalybridge and Hyde	Tom Pendry	Labour
Stirling, Falkirk and Grangemouth	Harry Ewing	Labour
Stirlingshire, East and Clackmannan	Martin O'Neill	Labour
Stirlingshire, West	Dennis Canavan	Labour
Stockport, North	Andrew Bennett	Labour
Stockport, South	Tom McNally	Labour, then SDP
Stoke-on-Trent, Central	Robert Cant	Labour
Stoke-on-Trent, North	John Forrester	Labour
Stoke-on-Trent, South	Jack Ashley	Labour
Stratford-on-Avon	Angus Maude	Conservative
Stretford	Winston Churchill	Conservative
Stroud	Anthony Kershaw	Conservative
Sudbury and Woodbridge	Keith Stainton	Conservative
Sunderland, North	Frederick Willey	Labour
Sunderland, South	Gordon Bagier	Labour
Surbiton	Sir Nigel Fisher	Conservative
Surrey, East	Sir Geoffrey Howe	Conservative
Surrey, North West	Michael Grylls	Conservative
Sussex, Mid	Tim Renton	Conservative
Sutton, Carshalton	Nigel Forman	Conservative
Sutton, Sutton and Cheam	Neil Macfarlane	Conservative
Sutton Coldfield	Norman Fowler	Conservative
Swansea, East	Donald Anderson	Labour
Swansea, West	Alan Williams	Labour
Swindon	David Stoddart	Labour
=== T ===
Taunton	Edward du Cann	Conservative
Teesside, Middlesbrough	Arthur Bottomley	Labour
Teesside, Redcar	James Tinn	Labour
Teesside, Stockton	William Rodgers	Labour, then SDP
Teesside, Thornaby	Ian Wrigglesworth	Labour Co-operative, then SDP
Thanet, East	Jonathan Aitken	Conservative
Thanet, West	William Rees-Davies	Conservative
Thirsk and Malton	John Spence	Conservative
Thurrock	Oonagh McDonald	Labour
Tiverton	Robin Maxwell-Hyslop	Conservative
Tonbridge and Malling	John Stanley	Conservative
Torbay	Sir Frederic Bennett	Conservative
Totnes	Ray Mawby	Conservative
Tower Hamlets, Bethnal Green and Bow	Ian Mikardo	Labour
Tower Hamlets, Stepney and Poplar	Peter Shore	Labour
Truro	David Penhaligon	Liberal
Tynemouth	Neville Trotter	Conservative
=== U ===
Ulster, Mid	John Dunlop	United Ulster Unionist
=== W ===
Wakefield	Walter Harrison	Labour
Wallasey	Lynda Chalker	Conservative
Wallsend	Ted Garrett	Labour
Walsall, North	David Winnick	Labour
Walsall, South	Bruce George	Labour
Waltham Forest, Chingford	Norman Tebbit	Conservative
Waltham Forest, Leyton	Bryan Magee	Labour, then SDP
Waltham Forest, Walthamstow	Eric Deakins	Labour
Wandsworth, Battersea, North	Douglas Jay	Labour
Wandsworth, Battersea, South	Alfred Dubs	Labour
Wandsworth, Putney	David Mellor	Conservative
Wandsworth, Tooting	Tom Cox	Labour
Warley, East	Andrew Faulds	Labour
Warley, West	Peter Archer	Labour
Warrington	Sir Thomas Williams	Labour Co-operative
Warwick and Leamington	Dudley Smith	Conservative
Watford	Tristan Garel-Jones	Conservative
Wellingborough	Peter Fry	Conservative
Wells	Hon. Robert Boscawen	Conservative
Welwyn and Hatfield	Christopher Murphy	Conservative
West Bromwich, East	Peter Snape	Labour
West Bromwich, West	Betty Boothroyd	Labour
Westbury	Dennis Walters	Conservative
Western Isles	Donald Stewart	Scottish National Party
Westhoughton	Roger Stott	Labour
West Lothian	Tam Dalyell	Labour
Westmorland	Michael Jopling	Conservative
Weston-super-Mare	Jerry Wiggin	Conservative
Whitehaven	John Cunningham	Labour
Widnes	Gordon Oakes	Labour
Wigan	Alan Fitch	Labour
Winchester	John Browne	Conservative
Windsor and Maidenhead	Alan Glyn	Conservative
Wirral	David Hunt	Conservative
Woking	Cranley Onslow	Conservative
Wokingham	William van Straubenzee	Conservative
Wolverhampton, North East	Renee Short	Labour
Wolverhampton, South East	Robert Edwards	Labour Co-operative
Wolverhampton, South West	Nicholas Budgen	Conservative
Worcester	Peter Walker	Conservative
Worcestershire, South	Michael Spicer	Conservative
Workington	Dale Campbell-Savours	Labour
Worthing	Terence Higgins	Conservative
Wrekin, The	Warren Hawksley	Conservative
Wrexham	Tom Ellis	Labour, then SDP
Wycombe	Ray Whitney	Conservative
=== Y ===
Yarmouth	Anthony Fell	Conservative
Yeovil	John Peyton	Conservative
York	Alexander Lyon	Labour

== By-elections ==
See the list of United Kingdom by-elections.

Two seats were vacant when Parliament was dissolved preparatory to the 1983 general election:

- Cardiff, North-West – Michael Roberts (Con) died 10 February 1983
- Rhondda – Alec Jones (Lab) died 20 March 1983

== See also ==
- List of MPs for constituencies in Scotland (1979–1983)
- List of MPs for constituencies in Wales (1979–1983)
