= Helen McElhone =

Scottish politician

Member of Parliament for Glasgow Queen's Park
- In office 3 December 1982 – 13 May 1983
- Preceded by: Frank McElhone
- Succeeded by: Constituency Abolished

Personal details
- Born: Helen Margaret Brown; 10 April 1933 Glasgow, Scotland
- Died: 5 June 2013 (aged 80) Newton Mearns, Scotland
- Party: Labour
- Spouse: Frank McElhone
- Children: 4, including Johnny
- Occupation: Shop worker

Helen Margaret McElhone (née Brown; 10 April 1933 – 5 June 2013) was a Scottish politician. She worked together with her husband, Frank McElhone, during his time as a Member of Parliament (MP) representing Glasgow from 1969. After his sudden death, McElhone was elected as his successor; but within six months her Glasgow Queen's Park constituency was abolished in boundary changes and she lost out to a neighbouring MP in the selection for a new seat. She continued her political activity after leaving Parliament.

== Background ==
McElhone was born Helen Margaret Brown in Glasgow, to a Roman Catholic family. She married Frank McElhone in November 1958, and they had two sons and two daughters. Both of their sons were involved in the band Altered Images, with Gerard serving as the band's manager and Johnny playing bass guitar. She "took an active interest" in the greengrocer's business run by her husband on Thistle Street in Gorbals for eight years. When he was elected to Parliament to represent Glasgow Gorbals in a 1969 by-election, she took over running the shop. She became a member of the Union of Shop, Distributive and Allied Workers.

During Frank McElhone's time in Parliament, Helen McElhone was an active worker within his Constituency Labour Party and was regarded by some as the driving force behind her husband's career. She took constituency surgeries on his behalf when he was attending Parliament, and also sat in on committees in Westminster.

== By-election candidate ==
Frank McElhone died in Glasgow on 22 September 1982, while participating in a 'Day of Action' march and demonstration in support of National Health Service workers; his death meant a by-election must be held. His wife was not initially considered a likely candidate, but local party colleagues were said to have persuaded her to put her name forward for the selection contest. There were rival candidates including Jimmy Wray, who was a local councillor and had been Frank McElhone's election agent, but she picked up nominations from ward branches within the constituency. After a bitter contest within the local party, she defeated Wray for the selection on 3 November, 29 votes to 28.

One of the main issues in the by-election was the future of the chronically damp Hutchesontown E tower block in the constituency, although a debate called by the local residents' association drew few attendees. McElhone called for the block to be demolished and proper council houses built. McElhone told a public meeting that electing her would not give the constituency "an MP aiming for the top of the political tree", but instead a "Glasgow housewife determined to look out for her own folk". She was personally friendly with her Scottish National Party rival Peter Mallan, but a protest was entered on her behalf when he claimed that voters were disgruntled at her selection and that she was in a "fortunate position" compared with other widows. Reporters following the by-election noted that McElhone did not seek a sympathy vote.

Although supported by Tony Benn, for whom her husband had worked as his Parliamentary Private Secretary, McElhone disclaimed the label of 'Bennite'. She supported separate Roman Catholic schools, and opposed abortion while supporting nationalisation and unilateral nuclear disarmament.

== Parliamentary career ==
On 2 December 1982 Queen's Park voters went to the polls; McElhone was elected with a majority of 5,694 votes over the Scottish National Party. She said that her victory was inevitably tinged with sadness, but was a triumphant night for the Labour Party. She made her maiden speech on 17 January 1983, in a debate on housing in Scotland, noting that her husband had chosen the same subject for his maiden speech. She criticised the past housing schemes in her constituency including the Hutchesontown C project by Sir Basil Spence, for which he had won awards but which had become uninhabitable owing to damp. At Prime Minister's Questions on 17 February 1983, she accused Margaret Thatcher of misleading women with a confidence trick, and called for a June general election.

=== Boundary changes ===
Before McElhone was selected, it was known that boundary changes, due to take place at the following general election, would abolish the separate Glasgow Queen's Park constituency and merge the majority of it with parts of five others in the new Glasgow Central constituency. McElhone was determined to fight her corner, against Bob McTaggart (sitting MP for the old Glasgow Central constituency) and Jimmy Wray who insisted on his right to stand in the selection contest despite Labour Party rules rendering him ineligible. Wray was eventually ruled out, and McTaggart was regarded as the favourite as he benefited from the votes of Wray's supporters. McTaggart won, and McElhone did not stand at the 1983 general election.

== Post-parliamentary life ==
After her brief term in Parliament, McElhone fought for election to Strathclyde Regional Council in Bellahouston-Mosspark division in a by-election in March 1985, and won with a majority of 1,632. She became vice-chairman of the Finance Committee in 1987, criticising the Government for reducing the rate support grant paid to councils.

As a regional councillor in 1989, McElhone pressed for the development of a sports and community centre on waste ground opposite Ibrox Stadium, persuading the council, Rangers F.C. and the Scottish Development Agency to provide funding. She was mentioned as a possible Labour candidate for the Glasgow Central seat after the death of Robert McTaggart in March 1989, but decided not to run.

McElhone was one of five 'experienced members' named by the Scottish Labour Party to sit on a panel vetting applications to be Labour candidates at the 1999 Scottish Parliament elections. Members of the panel had to be people who were not interested in themselves standing. She joined an 'action group' campaigning for the Dixon Community, a voluntary group helping the elderly lead independent lives, which was facing closure because of the costs of repairing its headquarters building. She was also a member of an independent panel appointed by the House of Commons in 2000 to decide on an application by Railtrack to raise the roof of Edinburgh Waverley railway station.

McElhone died from heart failure in Newton Mearns on 5 June 2013, at the age of 80.

== See also ==
- List of United Kingdom MPs with the shortest service

Parliament of the United Kingdom
Preceded by Frank McElhone	Member of Parliament for Glasgow Queen's Park; 1982 – 1983	Constituency abolished
