= 1982 Glasgow Queen's Park by-election =

UK parliamentary by-election

- 2 December 1982

Constituency of Glasgow Queen's Park
- Turnout: 47.0% ▼21.4%

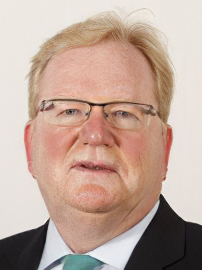

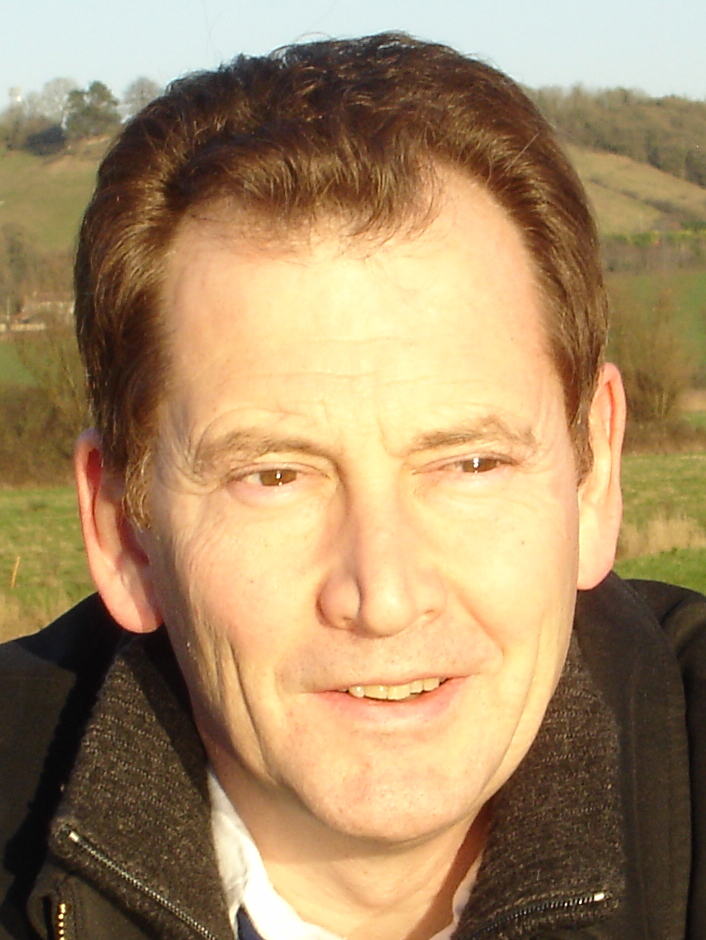
	First party	Second party
Candidate	Helen McElhone	Peter Mallan
Party	Labour	SNP
Popular vote	8,851	3,157
Percentage	56.0%	20.0%
Swing	▼8.4%	▲10.3%
	Third party	Fourth party
Candidate	Jackson Carlaw	Graham Watson
Party	Conservative	Liberal
Popular vote	1,888	1,487
Percentage	12.0%	9.4%
Swing	▼12.0%	New
MP before election
Frank McElhone
Labour
Elected MP
Helen McElhone
Labour

The 1982 Glasgow Queen's Park by-election was a parliamentary by-election held on 2 December 1982 for the UK House of Commons constituency of Glasgow Queen's Park.

== Previous MP ==
The seat fell vacant when the constituency's Labour Member of Parliament (MP), Francis Patrick "Frank" McElhone (5 April 1929 – 22 September 1982) died.

McElhone was elected Member of Parliament for Glasgow Gorbals at a 1969 by-election, serving until the constituency was abolished in boundary changes for the February 1974 general election.

He was then elected as MP for Glasgow Queen's Park, and held that seat until he died in office in 1982 at the age of 53. He served as Parliamentary Under-Secretary of State for Scotland from 1975 to 1979.

== Candidates ==
Seven candidates were nominated. The list below is set out in descending order of the number of votes received at the by-election.

1. Representing the Labour Party was Helen McElhone, born Helen Margaret Brown in 1933.

Following the death of her husband Frank McElhone MP in 1982, Helen McElhone was elected as his successor in the resulting by-election. However, she served for only six months as the seat was abolished by boundary changes before the 1983 general election.

After her brief term as MP, she was a Strathclyde Regional Councillor for a number of years until 1995 for the Scottish Labour Party, on whose Selection Panel she served to approve candidates for the 1999 Scottish Parliament elections.

2. The Scottish National Party candidate was Peter Mallan (1934–2014). He worked as a teacher and broadcaster. He also contested Glasgow Central in the 1983 general election.

3. The Conservative nominee was 23-year-old Jackson Carlaw. Margaret Thatcher personally helped campaign for Carlaw during the by-election. He later became an MSP and one-time leader of the Scottish Conservative Party.

4. The Liberal Party candidate, representing the SDP-Liberal Alliance, was Graham Watson. He had, as an Independent Liberal candidate, stood in the Glasgow Central constituency, in a by-election on 29 June 1980.

He subsequently became a prominent figure in the politics of the European Union.

5. John R. Kay, a draughtsman who had become the full-time Glasgow secretary of the Communist Party of Great Britain, was born in June 1926. He was the Communist nominee in the last two elections in the Glasgow Gorbals constituency (a 1969 by-election and the 1970 general election) and all the contests in Glasgow Queen's Park (the two 1974 and the 1979 general elections, as well as the 1982 by-election).

6. John Connell was an Independent, using the ballot paper label "Peace and Socialist". He later contested the 1983 Penrith and The Border by-election, the 1984 Chesterfield by-election, and the 1985 Tyne Bridge by-election.

7. A. H. Tennent represented the Scottish Republican Socialist Party.

== Previous result ==
General election 1979: Glasgow Queen's Park
Party	Candidate	Votes	%	±%
Labour	Frank McElhone	15,120	64.4	+8.3
Conservative	Julius Collins	5,642	24.0	+7.0
SNP	Philip Greene	2,276	9.7	−12.1
Communist	John Kay	263	1.1	−0.3
Workers Revolutionary	Jean Kerrigan	99	0.4	New
Socialist Unity	W. MacLellan	92	0.4	New
Majority		9,478	40.4	+6.1
Turnout		23,492	68.4	+1.4
Labour hold		Swing	+0.7	
Registered electors		34,332		

- Death of Frank McElhone

== Result ==
By-Election 2 December 1982: Glasgow Queen's Park
Party	Candidate	Votes	%	±%
Labour	Helen McElhone	8,851	56.0	−8.4
SNP	Peter Mallan	3,157	20.0	+10.3
Conservative	Jackson Carlaw	1,888	12.0	−12.0
Liberal	Graham Watson	1,487	9.4	New
Communist	John Kay	339	2.1	+1.0
Independent	John Connell	40	0.3	New
Scottish Republican Socialist	A.H. Tennent	39	0.2	New
Majority		5,694	36.0	−4.4
Turnout		15,701	47.0	−21.4
Labour hold		Swing	-9.4	
Registered electors		33,641		

== Aftermath ==
Writing of the result of the by-election in the next day's edition of The Glasgow Herald, the political correspondent called the result "a reasonable one for the Labour Party" adding that Labour's leader Michael Foot would be perfectly pleased with it. On the other hand, he argued that it was "a bad result for the Conservatives", but noted that the party "could really have expected little more in an area like Queen's Park." He considered the result a good one for the SNP, which "could not have come at a better time with their internal problems once again in the news." He also speculated that the SNP's performance could "revive thoughts of devolution in the minds of some Labour politicians who have been keeping conspicuously quiet on the subject as of late." another Glasgow newspaper, the Evening Times, reported that Labour's "majority was substantially bigger than party analysts had predicted."

Helen McElhone's election meant that the number of female MP's in Scotland was increased to two, as Judith Hart had been the only woman returned in Scotland at the 1979 general election

== See also ==
- Glasgow Queen's Park constituency
- Lists of United Kingdom by-elections
- United Kingdom by-election records
