= Frank McElhone =

British politician (1929–1982)

Frank Elhone MP

Parliamentary Under-Secretary of State for Scotland
- In office 12 September 1975 – 4 May 1979
- Prime Minister: Harold Wilson; James Callaghan
- Preceded by: Robert Hughes
- Succeeded by: Malcolm Rifkind

Member of Parliament for Glasgow Queen's Park Glasgow Gorbals (1969–February 1974)
- In office 31 October 1969 – 22 September 1982
- Preceded by: Alice Cullen
- Succeeded by: Helen McElhone

Personal details
- Born: 5 April 1929
- Died: 22 September 1982 (aged 53) Glasgow, Scotland
- Party: Labour
- Spouse: Helen Brown
- Children: Johnny

Francis Patrick McElhone (5 April 1929 – 22 September 1982) was a Scottish Labour Party politician.

McElhone was elected Member of Parliament (MP) for Glasgow Gorbals in a 1969 by-election. He served until the constituency was abolished in boundary changes for the February 1974 general election.

He was then elected as MP for Glasgow Queen's Park, and held that seat until his death from a heart attack on 22 September 1982, aged 53, shortly after participating in a march and demonstration in support of National Health Service workers in Glasgow. He served as Parliamentary Under-Secretary of State for Scotland from 1975 to 1979.

After his death, his widow, Helen McElhone, was elected to represent Glasgow Queen's Park. She only served for a few months before the seat was abolished by boundary changes. Their son is the musician Johnny McElhone.

Parliament of the United Kingdom
Preceded by Alice Cullen	Member of Parliament for Glasgow Gorbals; 1969–February 1974	Constituency abolished
New constituency	Member of Parliament for Glasgow Queen's Park; February 1974–1982	Succeeded by Helen McElhone
