= Glasgow Queen's Park =

UK Parliament constituency (1974–1983)

- Former burgh constituency for the House of Commons
- Subdivisions of Scotland: City of Glasgow district

1974–1983
- Seats: One
- Created from: Glasgow Gorbals; Glasgow Cathcart
- Replaced by: Glasgow Central; Glasgow Rutherglen; Glasgow Cathcart

Glasgow Queen's Park was a short-lived burgh constituency represented in the House of Commons of the Parliament of the United Kingdom from 1974 until 1983. It elected one Member of Parliament (MP) using the first-past-the-post voting system

== Boundaries ==
The County of the City of Glasgow wards of Gorbals, Govanhill, and Hutchesontown, and part of Langside ward.

The constituency covered part of inner city Glasgow, to the south of the River Clyde and in the south-west of the city.

Before the February 1974 general election, the area had formed the major part of Glasgow Gorbals (Gorbals, Hutchesontown and part of Govanhill wards) and part of Glasgow Cathcart (the rest of Govanhill and Langside wards).

In the 1983 redistribution, this constituency disappeared. 675 voters (2.0% of its electorate) were transferred to Glasgow Cathcart, 27,528 electors became part of Glasgow Central (79.7%), and the remaining 6,332 voters (18.4%) were included in the electorate of Glasgow Rutherglen.

== Members of Parliament ==
Election	Member	Party	Notes
Feb 1974	Frank McElhone	Labour	Previously MP for Glasgow Gorbals from 1969 by-election. Died September 1982
1982 by-election	Helen McElhone	Labour	
1983	constituency abolished		

== Election results ==
General election February 1974: Glasgow Queen's Park
Party	Candidate	Votes	%	±%
Labour	Frank McElhone	15,883	56.2	
Conservative	William Shearer	7,517	26.6	
SNP	David Graham MacKellar	4,394	15.6	
Communist	John Robert Kay	372	1.3	
International Marxist	Robert McGoven Purdie	90	0.3	
Majority		8,366	29.6	
Turnout		28,256	73.3	
Labour win (new seat)				
Registered electors		38,567		

General election October 1974: Glasgow Queen's Park
Party	Candidate	Votes	%	±%
Labour	Frank McElhone	14,574	56.1	−0.1
SNP	David Graham MacKellar	5,660	21.8	+6.2
Conservative	Iain David MacKinnon	4,421	17.0	−9.6
Liberal	Moira Hughes Aitchison	966	3.7	New
Communist	John Robert Kay	354	1.4	+0.1
Majority		8,914	34.3	+4.7
Turnout		25,975	67.0	−6.3
Labour hold		Swing		
Registered electors		38,776		

General election 1979: Glasgow Queen's Park
Party	Candidate	Votes	%	±%
Labour	Frank McElhone	15,120	64.4	+8.3
Conservative	Julius Collins	5,642	24.0	+7.0
SNP	Philip Greene	2,276	9.7	−12.1
Communist	John Robert Kay	263	1.1	−0.3
Workers Revolutionary	Jean Kerrigan	99	0.4	New
Socialist Unity	Walter MacLellan	92	0.4	New
Majority		9,478	40.4	+6.1
Turnout		23,492	68.4	+1.4
Labour hold		Swing	+0.7	
Registered electors		34,332		

- Death of Frank McElhone

1982 Glasgow Queen's Park by-election
Party	Candidate	Votes	%	±%
Labour	Helen McElhone	8,851	56.0	−8.4
SNP	Peter Mallan	3,157	20.0	+10.3
Conservative	Jackson Carlaw	1,888	12.0	−12.0
Liberal	Graham Watson	1,487	9.4	New
Communist	John Robert Kay	339	2.1	+1.0
Independent	John Connell	40	0.3	New
Scottish Republican Socialist	Alistair H. Tennent	39	0.2	New
Majority		5,694	36.0	−4.4
Turnout		15,701	47.0	−21.4
Labour hold		Swing	-9.4	
Registered electors		33,641		
