= List of MPs for constituencies in Scotland (1987–1992) =

- Colours on map indicate the party allegiance of each constituency's MP.

This is a list of the 72 members of Parliament (MPs) elected to the House of Commons of the United Kingdom by Scottish constituencies for the Fiftieth parliament of the United Kingdom (1987 to 1992) at the 1987 United Kingdom general election.

== Composition at election ==
Affiliation	Members
Labour Party	50
Alliance	9
Scottish National Party	3
Conservative Party	10
Total	72

== Composition at dissolution ==
Affiliation	Members
Labour Party	50
Liberal Democrats	10
Scottish National Party	5
Conservative Party	9
Total	72

== List ==
Constituency	MP	Party	Notes
Aberdeen North	Robert Hughes	Labour	
Aberdeen South	Frank Doran	Labour	
Argyll and Bute	Ray Michie	Alliance (Liberal)	Scottish Liberal Democrat from 1988
Ayr	George Younger	Conservative	
Banff and Buchan	Alex Salmond	Scottish National Party	
Caithness and Sutherland	Robert Maclennan	Alliance (SDP)	Scottish Liberal Democrat from 1988
Carrick, Cumnock and Doon Valley	George Foulkes	Labour Co-operative	
Central Fife	Henry McLeish	Labour	
Clackmannan	Martin O'Neill	Labour	
Clydebank and Milngavie	Tony Worthington	Labour	
Clydesdale	Jimmy Hood	Labour	
Cumbernauld and Kilsyth	Norman Hogg	Labour	
Cunninghame North	Brian Wilson	Labour	
Cunninghame South	David Lambie	Labour	
Dumbarton	John McFall	Labour Co-operative	
Dumfries	Hector Monro	Conservative	
Dundee East	John McAllion	Labour	
Dundee West	Ernie Ross	Labour	
Dunfermline East	Gordon Brown	Labour	
Dunfermline West	Dick Douglas	Labour Co-operative	SNP from 1990
East Angus	Andrew Welsh	Scottish National Party	
East Kilbride	Adam Ingram	Labour	
East Lothian	John Home Robertson	Labour	
Eastwood	Allan Stewart	Conservative	
Edinburgh Central	Alistair Darling	Labour	
Edinburgh East	Gavin Strang	Labour	
Edinburgh Leith	Ron Brown	Labour	
Edinburgh Pentlands	Malcolm Rifkind	Conservative	
Edinburgh South	Nigel Griffiths	Labour	
Edinburgh West	James Douglas-Hamilton	Conservative	
Falkirk East	Harry Ewing	Labour	
Falkirk West	Dennis Canavan	Labour	
Galloway and Upper Nithsdale	Ian Lang	Conservative	
Glasgow Cathcart	John Maxton	Labour	
Glasgow Central	Bob Mctaggart	Labour	1989 By-election
Glasgow Garscadden	Donald Dewar	Labour	
Glasgow Govan	Bruce Millan	Labour	1988 By-election
Glasgow Hillhead	George Galloway	Labour	
Glasgow Maryhill	Maria Fyfe	Labour	
Glasgow Pollok	Jimmy Dunnachie	Labour	
Glasgow Provan	Jimmy Wray	Labour	
Glasgow Rutherglen	Thomas McAvoy	Labour Co-operative	
Glasgow Shettleston	David Marshall	Labour	
Glasgow, Springburn	Michael Martin	Labour	
Gordon	Malcolm Bruce	Alliance (Liberal)	Scottish Liberal Democrat from 1988
Greenock and Port Glasgow	Norman Godman	Labour	
Hamilton	George Robertson	Labour	
Inverness, Nairn and Lochaber	Russell Johnston	Alliance (Liberal)	Scottish Liberal Democrat from 1988
Kilmarnock and Loudoun	Willie McKelvey	Labour	
Kincardine and Deeside	Alick Buchanan-Smith	Conservative	1991 By-election
Kirkcaldy	Dr Lewis Moonie	Labour Co-operative	
Linlithgow	Sir Tam Dalyell	Labour	
Livingston	Robin Cook	Labour	
Midlothian	Alex Eadie	Labour	
Monklands East	John Smith	Labour	
Monklands West	Tom Clarke	Labour	
Moray	Margaret Ewing	Scottish National Party	
Motherwell North	John Reid	Labour	
Motherwell South	Jeremy Bray	Labour	
North East Fife	Sir Menzies Campbell	Alliance (Liberal)	Scottish Liberal Democrat from 1988
North Tayside	Bill Walker	Conservative	
Orkney and Shetland	Jim Wallace	Alliance (Liberal)	Scottish Liberal Democrat from 1988
Paisley North	Allen Adams	Labour	1990 By-election
Paisley South	Norman Buchan	Labour	1990 By-election
Perth and Kinross	Nicholas Fairbairn	Conservative	
Renfrew West and Inverclyde	Tommy Graham	Labour	
Ross, Cromarty and Skye	Charles Kennedy	Alliance (SDP)	Scottish Liberal Democrat from 1988
Roxburgh and Berwickshire	Archy Kirkwood	Alliance (Liberal)	Scottish Liberal Democrat from 1988
Stirling	Michael Forsyth	Conservative	
Strathkelvin and Bearsden	Sam Galbraith	Labour	
Tweeddale, Ettrick and Lauderdale	David Steel	Alliance (Liberal)	Scottish Liberal Democrat from 1988
Western Isles	Calum Macdonald	Labour	

== By-elections ==
- 1988 Glasgow Govan By-election, Jim Sillars, SNP
- 1989 Glasgow Central By-election, Mike Watson, Labour
- 1990 Paisley North By-election, Irene Adams, Labour
- 1990 Paisley South By-election, Gordon McMaster, Labour
- 1991 Kincardine and Deeside By-election, Nicol Stephen, Scottish Liberal Democrat

== See also ==
- Lists of MPs for constituencies in Scotland
