= 1909 Glasgow Central by-election =

UK parliamentary by-election

The 1909 Glasgow Central by-election was a Parliamentary by-election held on 2 March 1909. The constituency returned one Member of Parliament (MP) to the House of Commons of the United Kingdom, elected by the first past the post voting system.

== Vacancy ==
Andrew Mitchell Torrance MP, circa 1906

Sir Andrew Torrance had been Liberal MP for the seat of Glasgow Central since the 1906 general election. He died on 4 February 1909 at the age of 64.

== Result ==
The Conservatives gained the seat.

1909 Glasgow Central by-election
Party	Candidate	Votes	%	±%
Conservative	Charles Dickson	7,298	58.5	+10.2
Liberal	Tommy Bowles	5,185	41.5	−10.2
Majority		2,113	17.0	N/A
Turnout		12,483	82.8	−0.5
Registered electors		15,081		
Conservative gain from Liberal		Swing	+10.2	

== Electoral history ==
The seat had been Liberal since they gained it in 1906;

General election January 1906: Glasgow Central
Party	Candidate	Votes	%	±%
Liberal	Andrew Mitchell Torrance	6,720	51.7	New
Conservative	John George Alexander Baird	6,289	48.3	N/A
Majority		431	3.4	N/A
Turnout		13,009	83.3	N/A
Registered electors		15,616		
Liberal gain from Conservative		Swing	N/A	

== Candidates ==
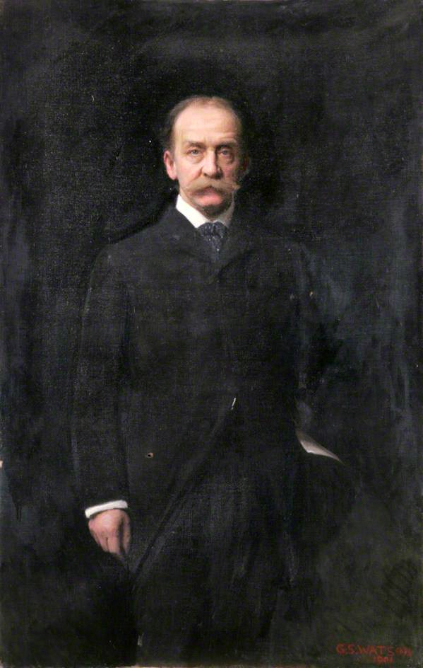
Thomas Gibson Bowles (1901)

The local Liberal Association selected 68-year-old Tommy Bowles to defend the seat. At the 1892 general election, he was elected as Conservative Party Member of Parliament for King's Lynn and served in the House of Commons until losing his seat at the 1906 election. He was a Free trade supporter and left the Conservatives when they adopted a policy of Trade tariffs.

The Conservatives selected 59-year-old Rt Hon. Charles Dickson as their candidate. Educated at the High School of Glasgow, the University of Glasgow and the University of Edinburgh he served as the Solicitor General for Scotland from 14 May 1896 to 1903 and as Lord Advocate from 1903 to 1905. He was appointed a Privy Counsellor in 1903. He was Member of Parliament for Glasgow Bridgeton from 1900 to 1906 when he was defeated.

== Campaign ==
Polling Day was fixed for 2 March 1909, 26 days after the death of Torrance.

The constituency included Glasgow's business district. The Liberals concentrated on fiscal issues. The Conservatives successfully raised the Irish problem. Bowles tried to win free trade Conservative votes by qualifying his support for Home Rule, favouring it only within a United Kingdom framework. There were about 2,000 Irish in the district. The United Irish League did not give Bowles their support until 27 February. The Conservative Chief Whip apparently had some fear of Dickson 'wobbling' over tariff reform but steadied him with a warning letter.

== Reaction ==
Bowles reaction to the result: "The Irish injured me, the Unemployed deserted to the enemy and biggest and worst defection of all, the determining elector, the businessman, who last time voted against Balfour and protection, this time voted against the Government and the Budget."

== Aftermath ==
Bowles was re-elected for King's Lynn at the January 1910 election as a Liberal. Dickson was re-elected here;

General election January 1910 Electorate
Party	Candidate	Votes	%	±%
Conservative	Charles Dickson	6,713	52.6	+4.3
Liberal	Alexander Murison	6,058	47.4	−4.3
Majority		655	5.2	N/A
Turnout		12,771	86.5	+3.2
Conservative gain from Liberal		Swing	+4.3	
