= Charles MacLeod =

Charles MacLeod may refer to:

- Charles Campbell MacLeod (1858–1936), chairman of the National Bank of India and of the Imperial Tea Company
- Sir Charles Henry MacLeod, 3rd Baronet (1924–2012), of the MacLeod baronets
- Charles MacLeod, former member of UK band of Seafood
