= Industry and Parliament Trust =

The Industry and Parliament Trust (IPT) is a charity that works to promote the mutual understanding of Parliament and business. It works within the Parliament of the United Kingdom and organisations from all sectors of industry. It is non-partisan, non-lobbying and not-for-profit.

Its activities include:

- Fellowship programmes for Members of Parliament (MPs) and peers. Fellowships provide the opportunity to gain hands-on experience at a variety of companies, spanning the various sectors through bespoke programmes of placements;
- Courses, seminars, panel discussions, lectures and events for policymakers, business people, academics, and civil servants;
- A series of policy events echoing the most pertinent issues of the day being discussed in Parliament and business.

The Industry and Parliament Trust is based in Whitehall, London, close to the Houses of Parliament.

== Fellowships ==
Fellowships are open to all MPs and peers irrespective of their political party. Most Fellowships consist of 12 days over 18 to 24 months, though are flexible to parliamentarians schedules, and all programmes are explicitly educational and non-lobbying, intended to give parliamentarians a greater understanding of the issues facing business and the British economy.

High-profile IPT Fellows include:

- Baroness Debbonaire
- Liz Twist MP, PPS to Keir Starmer as Prime Minister
- Sir Peter Bottomley, Former Father of the House
- Dame Harriett Baldwin DBE MP, Shadow Minister of State for Business and Trade
- The Rt Hon Baroness Morgan of Cotes
- The Rt Hon Baroness Fookes DBE DL
- The Rt Hon Baroness Jay of Paddington
- The Rt Hon Lord Martin of Springburn, former Speaker of the House of Commons (United Kingdom)
- The Rt Hon Baron Mawhinney
- The Rt Hon Lord McFall of Alcluith
- The Rt Hon Lord McNally PC
- The Rt Hon Jacqui Smith, former Home Secretary

All Fellows receive a cartoon upon completion of their Fellowship.

== Governance ==
The IPT Board of Trustees includes six MPs and four members of the House of Lords. It also includes representatives from business, legal and parliamentary clerks. The current chair of the trustees is Liz Twist and the Presidents are the Speaker of the House of Commons, The Rt Hon Sir Lindsay Hoyle MP and the Speaker of the House of Lords, The Lord McFall of Alcluith.

The Chief Executive is Nick Maher who began at the IPT in July 2011 having previously served in the Ministry of Defence on a team constructing a 'New Employment Model' for the Armed Forces. His predecessor was Sally Muggeridge, who was Chief Executive for seven years.

The IPT employs ten members of staff, all based in Whitehall, London.

== History ==
The IPT was founded in 1977 by the CEOs of 10 major British companies who sought to create dialogue between business and Parliament. It became a registered charity in 1983. The IPT has organised more than 600 Fellowship programmes since it was founded.

When the IPT was set up, just 15% of MPs had any direct business experience. Today that figure much higher, though needless to say there is still a substantial proportion of MPs without a comprehensive understanding of business.

In October 2009 the IPT commissioned a research project into the business experience of the Prospective Parliamentary Candidates (PPCs) who stood in the 2010 General Election. The research found that of the PPCs in winnable seats, less than half (48%) had any form of business management or financial services experience.

== Related organisations ==
The IPT has sister projects in Wales (Industry and National Assembly for Wales Association) and Northern Ireland (Northern Ireland Assembly and Business Trust). A Scottish project, the Scottish Parliament Business Exchange closed in 2016. New Zealand has its own version of the model, the NZ Business & Parliament Trust.
