= Haunted garden =

Haunted garden(s) may refer to:

== Literature ==
- The Haunted Garden, a 1947 poetry collection by Henry Treece
- The Haunted Garden, a 1966 novel by Rosemary Timperley
- The Haunted Garden, a 1973 novel by W. E. D. Ross
- Haunted Gardens, a 2009 supernatural book by Peter Underwood

== Other uses ==
- "The Haunted Garden", an episode of the television show Worlds Beyond
- Haunted Gardens, a 2019 album by Sadistik
