= 1980 Glasgow Central by-election =

UK parliamentary by-election

- 26 June 1980

Glasgow Central constituency
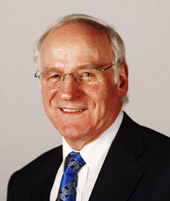
	First party	Second party	Third party
	LAB		CON
Candidate	Bob McTaggart	Gil Paterson	Anna McCurley
Party	Labour	SNP	Conservative
Popular vote	4,902	2,122	707
Percentage	60.8%	26.3%	8.8%
Swing	▼11.7 pp	▲15.2 pp	▼7.6 pp
MP before election
Thomas McMillan
Labour
Subsequent MP
Bob McTaggart
Labour

The 1980 Glasgow Central by-election was a by-election held on 26 June 1980 for the British House of Commons constituency of Glasgow Central, following the death of its sitting MP, Thomas McMillan.

On a turnout of 48%, the Labour Party held the seat.

== Background ==
Labour had held the seat for 30 years, having won it at the 1950 general election. McMillan had been the MP for the seat since 1966.

== Candidates ==
This was the last parliamentary by-election in England, Scotland or Wales not contested by an official candidate of either the Liberal Party, the SDP, or their successor party the Liberal Democrats; until the 2008 Haltemprice and Howden by-election. The Social Democrat candidate had no connection to the SDP (which wasn't created until 1981) and achieved the lowest vote for any candidate in a Parliamentary election under universal suffrage, a record later surpassed by the five votes obtained by independent campaigner Bill Boaks in the Glasgow Hillhead by-election of March 1982.

Because there was no official candidate, Liberal Party member Graham Watson offered himself as a candidate sponsored by the Scottish Young Liberals. He later became a Member of the European Parliament and leader of the Alliance of Liberals and Democrats for Europe group in the European Parliament.

As a seat considered safe for Labour, there was little surprise when its candidate Bob McTaggart was declared victor, with 60.8% of the votes cast. Both of his closest rivals were later elected to sit in British parliaments: Gil Paterson, representing the Scottish National Party, was elected as an MSP for Central Scotland in the first sitting of the Scottish Parliament in 1999, while Conservative Anna McCurley won the Renfrew West and Inverclyde seat in the general election of 1983. McCurley was at the time a member of Strathclyde Regional Council, to which she had been elected in 1978, and had unsuccessfully contested West Stirlingshire for the Conservatives at the previous general election.

While Labour won, the good performance of the SNP was described by The Glasgow Herald as the "surprise of the night" and the newspaper argued it marked their return "to the political stage" and that "both the major parties... were shaken" by the SNP's share of the vote.

== Result ==
1980 Glasgow Central by-election
Party	Candidate	Votes	%	±%
Labour	Bob McTaggart	4,902	60.8	−11.7
SNP	Gil Paterson	2,122	26.3	+15.2
Conservative	Anna McCurley	707	8.8	−7.6
National Front	John MacKenzie	148	1.8	New
Scottish Young Liberal	Graham Watson	134	1.7	New
Ecology	David Mellor	45	0.6	New
Social Democrat (1979)	Donald Kean	10	0.1	New
Majority		2,780	34.5	−21.5
Turnout		8,062		
Labour hold		Swing		

=== 1979 general election result ===
General election 1979: Glasgow Central
Party	Candidate	Votes	%	±%
Labour	Thomas McMillan	8,542	72.5	+8.9
Conservative	Farooq Saleem	1,937	16.4	+3.4
SNP	Stephen Bird	1,308	11.1	−8.1
Majority		6,605	56.0	+11.6
Turnout		11,787	59.5	−1.4
Labour hold		Swing		

== See also ==
- Glasgow Central – the 2005 re-creation of the historic constituency
- Lists of United Kingdom by-elections
- United Kingdom by-election records
- Elections in Scotland
