= Caledonia Consulting =

Public affairs and communications firm in Edinburgh, Scotland

Caledonia Consulting is a public affairs and communications firm, established (as Caledonia PR Ltd) in December 2006, in Edinburgh, Scotland, and run by director Margaret Smith.

== Involvement with Scottish Parliament Business Exchange ==
Scobie used to work for the public affairs company GPC International (involved in the Derek Draper 'Lobbygate' affair). Scobie attracted some controversy because he was simultaneously (from January 2007 to January 2008) secretary of the Scottish Parliament Business Exchange (SPBE), a venture set up in the Scottish Parliament with the stated purpose of educating MSPs and business about each other. It stated that it was "non-lobbying" and yet many of those associated with it (including Scobie) were or are professional lobbyists. This apparent conflict in the SPBE's operations led to a 2007 inquiry into its activities by the Standards Committee of the Scottish Parliament, on top of criticism voiced about the SPBE in 2002 and 2003.

In June 2007, the Sunday Herald reported:

"A report by the Standards Committee criticised the exchange and described its lack of legal accountability to Parliament as "unacceptable". Around £100,000 of public money was also given to the organisation. However, the Sunday Herald can reveal that the relaunched SPBE has failed to address the key problem raised by its critics, namely its closeness to Scotland's lobbying fraternity.

Scobie, the managing director of Caledonia Consulting, is in charge of the exchange on an interim basis following the departure of Ann Mearns. Caledonia's website offers clients a fixed fee charge for its services, such as £2000 for a "political audit". His internet blurb also states his team is "well-known" to MSPs.

But the appointment appears to jar with one of the key principles of the exchange, which is that the organisation must be"non-lobbying" in nature. Several MSPs sit on SPBE's board of directors, and presiding officer Alex Fergusson is listed as its honorary president. SNP MSP Alex Neil said: "I think there has to be a clear statement from the Exchange, making it clear that the new interim director cannot use his position to further his lobbying interests."

"I don't really consider myself a lobbyist, I consider myself a business consultant," said Scobie. "The clients that I work with want to understand how parliament operates, they want to understand how the committees are set up. It's not a case of saying, Devin, get closer to MSP X or Y'."

== Caledonia personnel ==
Also at Caledonia was another former director (2001-2008) of the SPBE, Lynda Gauld, a former lobbyist for Pfizer. Caledonia has also hired two former MSPs: David Davidson of the Conservative Party, also connected with the SPBE (2001-2007). while elected as an MSP, and Mike Watson (Lord Watson of Invergowrie), a former Labour Scottish Executive cabinet minister who was imprisoned for "fire raising" after he set alight the curtains at an Edinburgh hotel during a Scottish political awards event.

Caledonia Public Affairs is a member of the Association for Scottish Public Affairs.
