= Osama Saeed =

Scottish communications professional and politician

- Born: 27 May 1980 (age 46); Glasgow, Scotland
- Citizenship: Scottish
- Occupation: Politician
- Known for: Scottish National Party candidate for Glasgow Central in 2010
- Website: osamasaeed.org

Osama Saeed (born 27 May 1980) is a Scottish politician. Formerly he was Head of Media and Public Relations at Al Jazeera Media Network, and was a parliamentary candidate for the Scottish National Party in Glasgow Central in 2010.

== Early life ==
Saeed was born and brought up in Glasgow to Pakistani parents on 27 May 1980 and went to school in Bishopbriggs, East Dunbartonshire. He was an advisor to former First Minister of Scotland Alex Salmond and a prominent media figure. He has been listed as one of Scotland's Top 100 thinkers and opinion formers by the Scotsman newspaper, one of the country's "Brightest and Best" by the Sunday Herald, and has been described as "Scotland's most influential Muslim" by the Sunday Times. The Evening Times referred to him in 2010 as one of the SNP's "bright rising stars". His blog, "Rolled up Trousers" was named top Scottish political blog in 2007. He is also an alumnus of the US State Department's International Visitor Leadership Program. After an attempt to be elected to the House of Commons in 2010, Saeed joined Al Jazeera in Qatar.

== Views and activities ==
After the 2007 Glasgow International Airport attack, Saeed organised what is considered to be the first ever Muslim-organised demonstration against Al-Qaeda terrorism in the world. In March 2008, he called for legislation to be enacted against forced marriages. The Scottish Government announced a consultation on the issue a few months later, and law was passed in 2011.

In 2009, Saeed organised the response to the far-right Scottish Defence League holding protests in Glasgow and Edinburgh. Along with lawyer Aamer Anwar, he brought together a broad coalition called Scotland United to stage a celebration of multiculturalism including the STUC, Church of Scotland, Equality and Human Rights Commission, all the major political parties and many others. He also organised a response to the attack by two Muslims youths on an Edinburgh synagogue by offering to protect the building.

Osama had a role in the Stop the War Coalition, speaking at the anti-war demonstration on the eve of the Iraq war on 15 February 2003 which drew 1 million marchers. He was formerly a volunteer spokesman for the Muslim Association of Britain in Scotland, and before Anwar Al-Awlaki openly embraced terrorism, he called for his release from incarceration in Yemen. Years before the Arab uprisings, Saeed was a proponent of democracy and freedoms in the Muslim world. He wrote a 2005 article in The Guardian suggesting that the restoration of a caliphate could be based on democracy and human rights in response to comments by prime minister Tony Blair saying that it was the preserve of Al Qaeda. In 2009, Saeed said that Islamism was “irrelevant”, and that laws and public policy have to be made by leaders accountable to the people they govern.

Saeed founded the Scottish-Islamic Foundation which was launched with cross-parliamentary backing in June 2008. The leaders of the SNP, Liberal Democrat and Conservative parties gave their support.

Saeed's time at the Scottish-Islamic Foundation was dogged by allegations of cronyism after the organisation was awarded hundreds of thousands of pounds of grants by the SNP Government, the party for whom he was a parliamentary candidate. The funding was investigated by Audit Scotland who concluded that the appropriate procedures were followed in allocating the grant. The grant was provided to organise an Islamic cultural festival and a trade expo to attract investment from the Muslim world. Saeed suggested that Scotland hold a 'Tartan Week' in the Middle East to increase trade and investment. After delays in delivery, the SIF returned much of the funding, but organised Salaam Scotland, Scotland's first national festival of Muslim cultures. An independent auditor's report found no issues in the way Scottish Government grant money was accounted for. Saeed resigned from the SIF in February 2010 before contesting the General Election in May 2010. The SIF closed in January 2011.

In the 2010 General Election he stood as the SNP candidate for Glasgow Central. He finished in second place, improving the party's third place from the previous election and increasing their share of the vote by 2.7%. His campaign concentrated on opposing public spending cuts proposed by the Conservative and Labour parties, connecting Scotland to the high-speed rail network to London and Europe, and attracted high profile endorsements. First Minister Alex Salmond said of Saeed: "I don't think I've ever met anyone better suited to face down the rigours of Westminster and to make a presentation of principle for his community and for his country. I've never met anyone better endowed with the qualities required to be an outstanding member of parliament."

== Electoral history ==
=== 2010 general election ===
General election 2010: Glasgow Central
Party	Candidate	Votes	%	±%
Labour	Anas Sarwar	15,908	52.0	+3.8
SNP	Osama Saeed	5,357	17.5	+2.7
Liberal Democrats	Chris Young	5,010	16.4	−1.4
Conservative	John Bradley	2,158	7.1	+0.8
Green	Alastair Whitelaw	800	2.6	−2.3
BNP	Ian Holt	616	2.0	−0.4
Scottish Socialist	James Nesbitt	357	1.2	−2.8
UKIP	Ramsay Urquhart	246	0.8	+0.8
Pirate	Finlay Archibald	128	0.4	N/A
Majority		10,551	34.5	+4.1
Turnout		30,580	50.9	+7.1
Labour hold		Swing		
