= Rosemary Timperley =

British novelist, short story writer and screenwriter

- Born: 20 March 1920; Crouch End, North London
- Died: 9 November 1988 (aged 68)

Rosemary Timperley (20 March 1920 – 9 November 1988) was a British novelist, short story writer and screenwriter. She wrote a wide range of fiction, publishing 66 novels in 33 years, and several hundred short stories, but is best remembered for her ghost stories which appear in many anthologies. She also edited several volumes of ghost stories.

Her story Harry has been filmed several times.

== Biography ==
Born in Crouch End, North London on 20 March 1920 to architect George Kenyon Timperley and teacher Emily Mary (née Lethem), she went to Hornsey High School, before studying for a Bachelor of Arts degree in History at King's College London, graduating in 1941. She then taught English and History at South-East Essex County Technical School in Dagenham, Essex, and also worked at Kensington Citizens Advice Bureau during World War II. In the mid-1940s, while still working as a teacher, she started submitting short stories to magazines and newspapers, with the first, "Hot Air – and Penelope", being published in Illustrated 10 August 1946.

Still writing, she left her job as a teacher to become a staff writer for Reveille magazine in 1949, editing the personal advice column (under the pen name Jane Blythe), readers' letters and writing a number of stories, feature articles and book reviews. She married Physics teacher James McInnes Cameron in 1952, and they lived together in Essex. After writing a number of novels (starting with A Dread of Burning in 1956), she left Reveille to become a freelance writer, going on to write a number of radio and television scripts. By the early 1960s she had separated from her husband, who died in 1968, but she continued writing novels, short stories and scripts until her death on 9 November 1988.

== Bibliography ==
=== Novels ===
- A Dread of Burning (1956, James Barrie, UK)
- Web of Scandal (1957, James Barrie, UK)
- The Fairy Doll (1959, Robert Hale, UK)
- Dreamers in the Dark (1960, Robert Hale, UK)
- Shadow of a Woman (1960, Robert Hale, UK)
- The Velvet Smile (1961, Robert Hale, UK)
- Yesterday's Voices (1961, Robert Hale, UK)
- Twilight Bar (1962, Robert Hale, UK)
- Across a Crowded Room (1962, Robert Hale, UK)
- Let Me Go (1963, Robert Hale, UK)
- The Bitter Friendship (1963, Robert Hale, UK)
- The Veiled Heart (1964, John Gresham, UK)
- Broken Circle (1964, John Gresham, UK)
- The Suffering Tree (1965, Robert Hale, UK)
- Devils' Paradise (1965, Robert Hale, UK)
- The Haunted Garden (1966, Robert Hale, UK)
- They Met in Moscow (1966, Robert Hale, UK)
- Blind Alley (1967, Robert Hale, UK)
- Forgive Me (1967, Robert Hale, UK)
- My Room in Rome (1968, Robert Hale, UK)
- The Washers-Up (1968, Robert Hale, UK)
- Lights on the Hill (1968, Robert Hale, UK)
- The Cat-Walk (1969, Robert Hale, UK)
- The Tragedy Business (1969, Robert Hale, UK)
- Doctor Z (1970, Robert Hale, UK)
- The Mask Shop (1970, Robert Hale, UK)
- Rome With Mrs. Evening (1970, Robert Hale, UK)
- House of Secrets (1971, Robert Hale, UK) Sequel to The Tragedy Business (1969).
- The Summer Visitors (1971, Robert Hale, UK)
- Walk to San Michele (1971, Robert Hale, UK)
- The Long Black Dress (1972, Robert Hale, UK)
- The Passionate Marriage (1972, Robert Hale, UK)
- The Echo-Game (1973, Robert Hale, UK)
- Journey With Doctor Godley (1973, Robert Hale, UK) Sequel to The Tragedy Business (1969) and House of Secrets (1971).
- Shadows in the Park (1973, Robert Hale, UK)
- Juliet (1974, Robert Hale, UK)
- The White Zig-Zag Path (1974, Robert Hale, UK)
- Ali and Little Camel (1975, Robert Hale, UK)
- The Private Prisoners (1975, Robert Hale, UK)
- The Egyptian Woman (1976, Robert Hale, UK)
- The Stranger (1976, Robert Hale, UK)
- The Devil of the Lake (1977, Robert Hale, UK)
- The Phantom Husband (1977, Robert Hale, UK)
- The Man With the Beard (1977, Robert Hale, UK)
- The Nameless One (1978, Robert Hale, UK)
- Syrilla Black (1978, Robert Hale, UK)
- Suspicion (1978, Robert Hale, UK) Sequel to The Tragedy Business (1969), House of Secrets (1971) and Journey With Doctor Godley (1973).
- Justin and the Witch (1979, Robert Hale, UK)
- The Secretary (1979, Robert Hale, UK)
- Homeward Bound (1980, Robert Hale, UK)
- The House of Mad Children (1980, Robert Hale, UK)
- Miss X (1980, Robert Hale, UK)
- The Spell of the Hanged Man (1981, Robert Hale, UK)
- The Secret Dancer (1981, Robert Hale, UK)
- That Year at the Office (1981, Robert Hale, UK)
- The Face in the Leaves (1982, Robert Hale, UK)
- Night Talk (1982, Robert Hale, UK)
- Chidori's Room (1983, Robert Hale, UK)
- The Office Party – and After (1984, Robert Hale, UK)
- Love and Death (1985, Robert Hale, UK)
- Tunnel of Shadows (1986, Robert Hale, UK)
- The Wife's Tale (1986, Robert Hale, UK)
- After School Hours (1987, Robert Hale, UK)
- Inside (1988, Robert Hale, UK)
- Shadow on the Roof (1989, Robert Hale, UK)

=== Novel, as Rosemary Cameron ===
- People Without Shadows (1966, Geoffrey Bles, UK)

=== Collections ===
- The Listening Child: Three Short Novels (1956, James Barrie, UK); published in the US as 'Child in the Dark: Three Novelettes (1956, Crowell, US)
- A Trilogy (1976, Robert Hale, UK); an omnibus edition of The Washers-Up (1968), The Tragedy Business (1969) and Doctor Z (1970)

=== Anthologies edited and introduced ===
- The 5th Ghost Book (1969, Barrie & Rockliff, UK)
- The 6th Ghost Book (1970, Barrie & Rockliff, UK) Pan published the 1972 paperback in two volumes.
- The 7th Ghost Book (1971, Barrie & Rockliff, UK)
- The 8th Ghost Book (1972, Barrie & Rockliff, UK)
- The 9th Ghost Book (1973, Barrie & Rockliff, UK)
