= Sir John MacLeod, 1st Baronet =

British politician

Sir John Mackintosh MacLeod, 1st Baronet JP DL (5 May 1857 – 6 March 1934) was a Scottish accountant and MP for the Unionist Party. He sat for Glasgow Central from a by-election in 1915 to 1918, and for Glasgow Kelvingrove from 1918 to 1922. He was elected in 1918 as a supporter of David Lloyd George's coalition government.

He was from an old highland family, the second son of Rev. Norman MacLeod. He had a younger brother, the Scottish international rugby union footballer William MacKintosh MacLeod, and six sisters. He was a partner of Kerr, MacLeod & Macfarlan, Chartered Accountants, Glasgow. McLeod was created a baronet in the 1924 Prime Minister's Resignation Honours.

He married Edith Fielden, daughter of Joshua Fielden in 1888. They had two sons, the second baronet (and father of the third baronet), and George MacLeod, the fourth baronet, founder of the Iona Community, Moderator of the General Assembly of the Church of Scotland and Minister at Govan Old Parish Church. They also had a daughter, Ellen, who married Rev. James Alan Cameron Murray.

Parliament of the United Kingdom
Preceded by Charles Dickson	Member of Parliament for Glasgow Central; 1915 – 1918	Succeeded by Bonar Law
New constituency	Member of Parliament for Glasgow Kelvingrove; 1918 – 1922	Succeeded by William Hutchison
Baronetage of the United Kingdom
New creation	Baronet (of Fuinary); 1924–1934	Succeeded by John MacLeod
