= 1915 Glasgow Central by-election =

UK parliamentary by-election

The 1915 Glasgow Central by-election was held on 16 July 1915. The by-election was held due to the incumbent Unionist MP, Charles Dickson, becoming the Lord Justice Clerk. It was won by the Unionist candidate John MacLeod.

By-election 15 July 1915: Glasgow Central
Party	Candidate	Votes	%	±%
Unionist	John MacLeod	5,341	95.3	+41.5
Ind. Unionist	Gavin William Ralston	266	4.7	New
Majority		5,075	90.6	+83.0
Turnout		5,607	31.8	−54.6
Unionist hold		Swing		
