= MacLeod baronets =

United Kingdom Baronetcy

There have been two baronetcies created for persons with the surname MacLeod (pronounced "MacLoud"), both in the Baronetage of the United Kingdom. As of 2014 both titles are extant.

The MacLeod Baronetcy, of Fuinary, Morven, in the County of Argyll, was created in the Baronetage of the United Kingdom on 3 March 1924 for John MacLeod, who had earlier represented Glasgow Central and Kelvingrove in the House of Commons as a Conservative. His grandson, the third Baronet (who succeeded his father), was killed on active service in 1944. He was succeeded by his uncle, the fourth Baronet, George MacLeod. He was a clergyman, one of the best known, most influential and unconventional Church of Scotland ministers of the 20th century, and founder of the Iona Community on the island of Iona. In 1967 he was given a life peerage as Baron MacLeod of Fuinary, of Fuinary in Morven in the County of Argyll. This title became extinct on his death in 1991 while he was succeeded in the baronetcy by his son, the journalist Maxwell MacLeod, the fifth and (as of 2014) present holder of the title.

The MacLeod Baronetcy, of The Fairfields, Cobham, in the County of Surrey, was created in the Baronetage of the United Kingdom on 22 January 1925 for Charles MacLeod, Chairman of the National Bank of India and of the Imperial Tea Company. As of 2014 the title is held by his great-grandson, the fourth Baronet, who succeeded his father in 2012.

As of 28 February 2014 the present Baronet has not successfully proven his succession and is therefore not on the Official Roll of the Baronetage, with the baronetcy considered dormant since 2012.

== MacLeod baronets, of Fuinary (1924) ==
- Sir John Mackintosh MacLeod, 1st Baronet (1857–1934)
- Sir John Mackintosh Norman MacLeod, 2nd Baronet (1891–1939)
- Sir Ian Francis Norman MacLeod, 3rd Baronet (1921–1944)
- Sir George Fielden MacLeod, 4th Baronet (1895–1991) (created a life peer as Baron MacLeod of Fuinary in 1967)
- Sir John Maxwell Norman MacLeod, 5th Baronet (born 1952)

The heir presumptive is the present holder's only brother Neil David MacLeod (born 1959). There are no further heirs to the title.

== MacLeod baronets, of The Fairfields (1925) ==
- Sir Charles Campbell MacLeod, 1st Baronet (1858–1936)
- Sir Murdoch Campbell MacLeod, 2nd Baronet (1893–1950)
- Sir Charles Henry MacLeod, 3rd Baronet (1924–2012)
- Sir James Roderick Charles MacLeod, 4th Baronet (born 1960)

The heir apparent is the present holder's son Rory MacLeod (born 1994).
