= James Douglas Hamilton Dickson =

Scottish mathematician and expert in electricity

James Douglas Hamilton Dickson FRSE MRI (1 May 1849 – 6 February 1931) was a Scottish mathematician and expert in electricity. He was a Senior Fellow at Peterhouse, Cambridge. Glasgow University elected him an Eglinton Fellow. He was the elder brother of Charles Dickson, Lord Dickson.

He had in-depth knowledge in fields of electricity and electrostatics and also a great interest in low temperature physics.

== Life ==
He was born in Glasgow on 1 May 1849, a son of Dr John Robert Dickson of Edinburgh. He attended both Glasgow and Cambridge Universities, graduating MA. From 1867 to 1869 he was assistant to William Thomson, Lord Kelvin, being the joint-builder of the technical equipment which Kelvin used to measure electrostatic energy. In 1869, he assisted Kelvin in the laying of the first Transatlantic communication cables. The French company overseeing the work were impressed by Dickson and kept him in their employ as Electrician-in-Charge, based in Brest until 1870.

He returned to Cambridge to collaborate with W H King and Theophillus Varley in creating more of Lord Kelvin's machines, including the siphon recorder. In 1877 he became a Maths Tutor at Peterhouse, his alma mater. In 1907 the college made him a Senior Fellow. He was later made a Governor of the college. He was also a Governor of Huntingdon Grammar School.

He was elected a Fellow of the Royal Society of Edinburgh in 1876. His proposers were Sir James Dewar (his brother-in-law), Peter Guthrie Tait, Alexander Crum Brown, and William Turner.

During the First World War, at which point he was officially retired, he was asked to fill in for absent masters teaching Maths at both Fettes College and Edinburgh Academy.

He died on 6 February 1931, aged 81.

== Publications ==
Over and above multiple papers on mathematics and physics, Dickson enjoyed biographical work. Three entries in the Dictionary of National Biography are under his authorship:

- Peter Guthrie Tait
- Edward John Routh

== Family ==
He married Isobel Catherine Banks, sister of his sister-in-law Hestor Bagot Banks (i.e. the two brothers married two sisters). A third sister, Helen Rose Banks, married Sir James Dewar, connecting all three figures.
