= William Alexander (Glasgow MP) =

Brigadier-General Sir William Alexander KBE CB CMG DSO TD
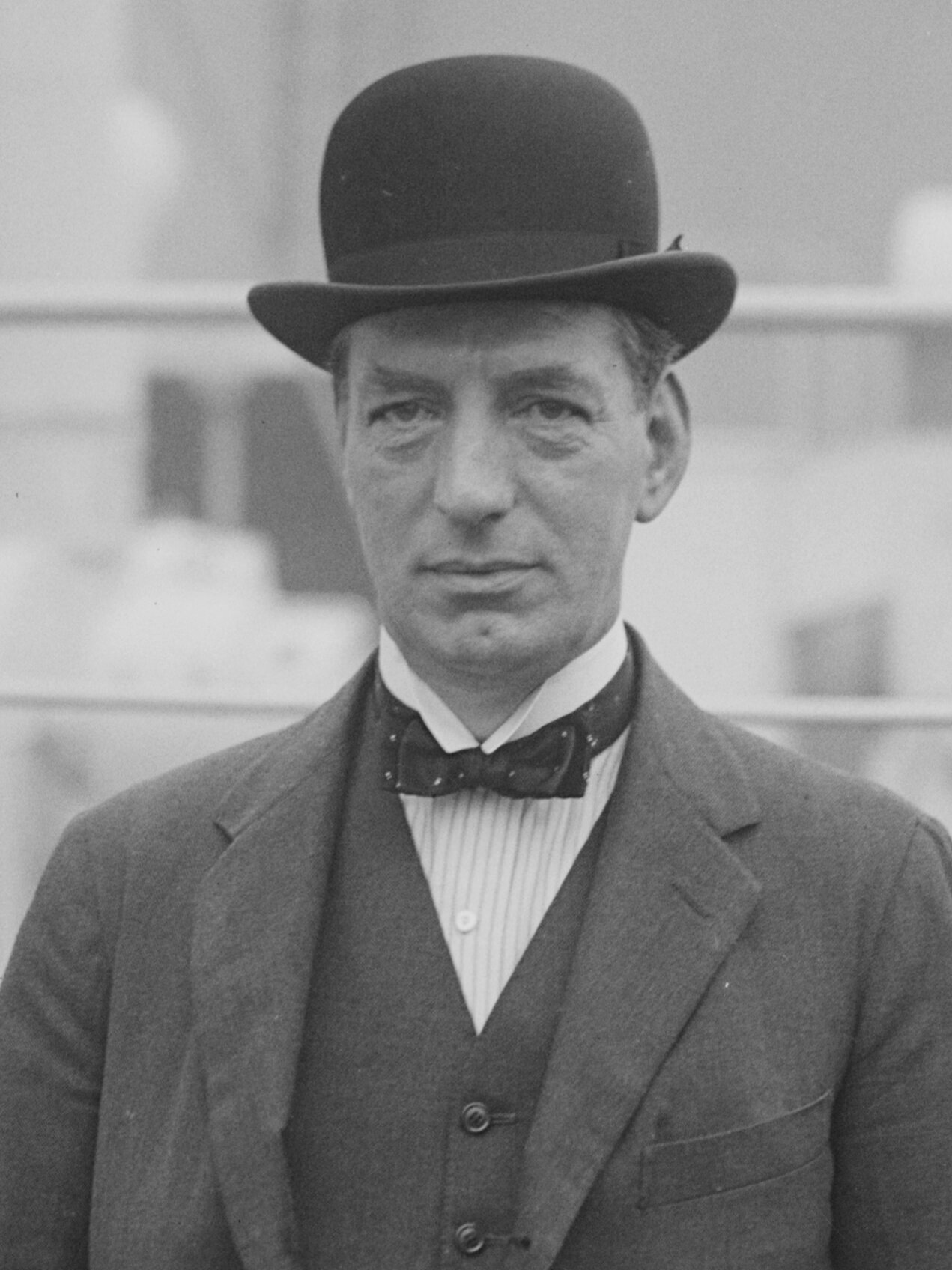
- Alexander in c. 1922

Member of Parliament for Glasgow Central
- In office 6 December 1923 – 4 July 1945
- Preceded by: Bonar Law
- Succeeded by: James Hutchison

Personal details
- Born: 4 May 1874
- Died: 29 December 1954 (aged 80)
- Party: Unionist Party

Military service
- Allegiance: United Kingdom
- Branch/service: British Army
- Years of service: 1899–1920
- Rank: Brigadier-General
- Commands: 6th Battalion, The Black Watch
- Battles/wars: First World War
- Awards: Companion of the Order of the Bath; Companion of the Order of St Michael and St George; Companion of the Distinguished Service Order; Territorial Decoration; Mentioned in Despatches; Legion of Honour (France); Officer of the Order of Saints Maurice and Lazarus (Savoy)

Brigadier-General Sir William Alexander, KBE, CB, CMG, DSO, TD (4 May 1874 – 29 December 1954) was a British businessman, British Army officer, civil servant, and Scottish Unionist Party politician. He was the Member of Parliament (MP) for Glasgow Central between the general elections of 1923 to 1945, when he stood down.

Educated at Kelvinside Academy, the University of Glasgow, and Göttingen, Alexander was commissioned into the Territorial Force in 1899, becoming captain in 1906, major in 1915, and brigadier general in 1917.

During the First World War, he commanded the 6th Battalion, The Black Watch. He was then appointed Director of Administration of Explosive Factories at the Ministry of Munitions from 1916 to 1917 and Controller of Aircraft Supply and Production at the same ministry from 1917 to 1919. He was Director-General of Purchases at the ministry from 1919 to 1920. He was a member of the Air Council in 1919.

He was a director of many companies. His chief business concerns were in chemicals and iron and steel.

He was appointed a Companion of the Distinguished Service Order in 1916, a Companion of the Order of St Michael and St George in 1918 and a Companion of the Order of the Bath in 1919; awarded the Territorial Decoration in 1919; and knighted as a Knight Commander of the Order of the British Empire in 1920. He also received the French Legion of Honour, and was appointed an Officer of the Order of Saints Maurice and Lazarus.

Parliament of the United Kingdom
Preceded by Bonar Law	Member of Parliament for Glasgow Central; 1923–1945	Succeeded by James Hutchison
