= Thomas McMillan (British politician) =

British politician (1919–1980)

Thomas McLellan McMillan (12 February 1919 – 30 April 1980) was a Scottish Labour politician.

McMillan was a wood machinist at the Cowlairs railway works in Springburn. He was a councillor on Glasgow Corporation from 1962 and a member of the city's Housing and Health Licensing Court.

McMillan was Member of Parliament for Glasgow Central from 1966 until 1980, when he died at a hospital in London due to injuries sustained falling from a bus two weeks prior. The resulting by-election was won by Bob McTaggart, who himself also died in office in 1989.

Parliament of the United Kingdom
Preceded by James McInnes	Member of Parliament for Glasgow Central; 1966–1980	Succeeded by Bob McTaggart
