= Anna McCurley =

Scottish politician (1943–2022)

Member of Parliament for Renfrew West and Inverclyde
- In office 9 June 1983 – 18 May 1987
- Preceded by: New constituency
- Succeeded by: Tommy Graham

Personal details
- Born: Anna Anderson Gemmell; 18 January 1943 Glasgow, Scotland
- Died: 31 October 2022 (aged 79)
- Party: Conservative; Liberal Democrats

Anna Anderson McCurley (née Gemmell; 18 January 1943 – 31 October 2022) was a Scottish politician.

== Early life and education ==
Anna Gemmell was born in Glasgow on 18 January 1943. Her parents ran a small business, and she was educated at the fee-paying Glasgow High School for Girls. When she was an adolescent, she suffered from a spinal tumour that left her completely paralysed down one side of her body, although she later made a complete recovery. Upon leaving school she attended the University of Glasgow, Strathclyde University and Jordanhill College of Education, where she received a Diploma in Secondary Education.

McCurley taught history at secondary schools for six years, before becoming a College Methods Tutor at Jordanhill College in 1972. She later trained to be a solicitor, but recurring health troubles forced her to eventually abandon these plans.

== Political career ==
As a young woman, McCurley was a member of the Liberals, but she was persuaded to join the Conservative Party after attending a speech given by Gerald Nabarro. She served as a Conservative councillor on Strathclyde Regional Council for the Camphill/Pollokshaws division from 1978 to 1982. Capitalising on this success, she then aimed for parliament by contesting West Stirlingshire at the 1979 general election and Glasgow Central in a 1980 by-election. Following the death of Tam Galbraith, the long-serving Conservative MP for Glasgow Hillhead, The Glasgow Herald reported that McCurley's name was being spoken about as a possible Conservative candidate to contest the by-election to elect his successor. However, the party ultimately ran Gerry Malone, who lost to Roy Jenkins of the Social Democratic Party (SDP).

McCurley was elected as Conservative Member of Parliament for the newly created seat of Renfrew West and Inverclyde in the 1983 general election landslide after a close three-way contest. She had a majority of 1,322 votes over the SDP's Dickson Mabon who finished second, with Labour's candidate George Doherty finishing only 208 votes behind Mabon. Mabon had been Labour MP for Greenock and Port Glasgow since 1974 (and prior to that its predecessor seat Greenock from 1955) until joining the SDP in 1981, but the Liberal Party had pushed for one of their members to contest that seat for the Alliance. Writing in The Guardian, Julia Langdon reported that a "great many people on the Scottish political scene" were pleased to see McCurley win, including several in the Labour Party – and not just because she had defeated a leading defector to the SDP, but because she was "plucky and, quite simply, popular."

McCurley lost Renfrew West and Inverclyde to Labour candidate Tommy Graham in 1987. During her time in Parliament, she was described by The Scotsman newspaper as outspoken and formidable, and praised by her successor for her political independence and interest in her constituents. She contested the Chairmanship of the Scottish Conservative and Unionist Association, the party's voluntary wing, in 1989, losing to Sir Michael Hirst, the former MP for Strathkelvin and Bearsden, in what was later described as a "bitter contest".

In 1997, she attempted to become the Conservative parliamentary candidate for the Eastwood constituency, but failed to make it to the shortlist stage, with Paul Cullen eventually taking the candidature. She explained her defeat by suggesting that her "views are more traditional Conservative than modern Conservative", but The Independent reported that she scuppered her already "slim chances" when she publicly stated that she would rather see Donald Duck become the candidate than her old foe Sir Michael Hirst, who was also competing to be selected.

McCurley joined the Scottish Liberal Democrats in 1998 and stood as a candidate in the 1999 elections to the Scottish Parliament for Eastwood.

== Personal life and death ==
McCurley's marriage to John McCurley, a psychiatrist, was dissolved in 1997. In her later years she was again affected by the spinal condition she had experienced as a child, which often left her in great pain. She died on 31 October 2022, at the age of 79.

== Other sources ==
- Times Guide to the House of Commons 1983
- Leigh Rayment's Peerage Pages

Parliament of the United Kingdom
New constituency	Member of Parliament for Renfrew West and Inverclyde; 1983–1987	Succeeded by Tommy Graham
