= Andrew Mitchell Torrance =

Scottish politician (1845–1909)

Andrew Mitchell Torrance

Andrew Mitchell Torrance (1845 – 4 February 1909) was a Scottish Liberal Party politician.

== Background ==
He was born in Old Cumnock, East Ayrshire in 1845. He was educated at Cumnock parish school. In 1861 he was apprenticed to Peter Kelso & Co., muslin manufacturers of Glasgow. In 1863, moving to London, he worked for Smith, Anderson & Co. In 1875, he became a partner and the firm changed its name to Miller, Son, & Torrance. He was given a knighthood in 1906.

== Municipal career ==
He was elected to the London County Council as a Liberal backed Progressive Party member representing Islington East. He was re-elected on every occasion until standing down in 1907. He was Deputy Chairman of the London County Council in 1897-98 and again in 1900-01 and served as Chairman in 1901–02. He was also involved in Islington Borough municipal politics, being elected to the council and serving as mayor of Islington from 1903 to 1905. In June 1903, he was appointed a deputy lieutenant of the County of London.

== Parliamentary career ==
Torrance first stood for Parliament at the 1900 general election in Islington East (his London County Council seat), but lost by a wide margin to the sitting Conservative MP Benjamin Louis Cohen.

1900 General Election: Islington, East
Party	Candidate	Votes	%	±%
Conservative	Benjamin Cohen	4,205	61.9	3.8
Liberal	Andrew Mitchell Torrance	2,586	38.1	−3.8
Majority		1,619	23.8	
Turnout		10,395	65.3	
Conservative hold		Swing		

At the next general election, in January 1906 he chose to contest a seat in his native Scotland and was elected as the MP for Glasgow Central (UK Parliament constituency), defeating the sitting Conservative MP John George Alexander Baird by a margin of 3.4%.

General election 1906: Glasgow Central
Party	Candidate	Votes	%	±%
Liberal	Andrew Mitchell Torrance	6,720	51.7	
Conservative	John George Alexander Baird	6,289	48.3	
Majority			3.4	
Turnout				
Liberal hold		Swing		

Parliament of the United Kingdom
Preceded by John George Alexander Baird	Member of Parliament for Glasgow Central; 1906–1909	Succeeded by Charles Dickson
Civic offices
Preceded by George Elliott	Mayor of Islington; 1903–1905	Succeeded by Henry Mills
