= Charles Dickson, Lord Dickson =

British politician (1850–1922)

Charles Dickson FRSE
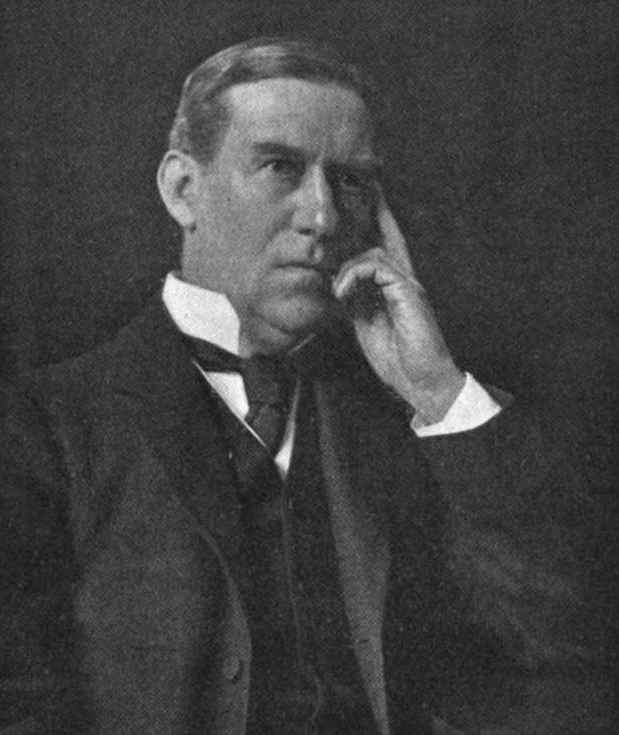

Member of Parliament
- In office 1900–1906
- Preceded by: Sir Charles Cameron
- Succeeded by: James William Cleland
- Constituency: Glasgow Bridgeton
- In office 1909–1915
- Preceded by: Andrew Mitchell Torrance
- Succeeded by: John McLeod
- Constituency: Glasgow Central

Solicitor General for Scotland
- In office 1896–1903
- Preceded by: Andrew Murray
- Succeeded by: David Dundas

Lord Advocate
- In office 1903–1905
- Preceded by: Andrew Murray
- Succeeded by: Thomas Shaw

Lord Justice Clerk
- In office 1915–1922
- Preceded by: John Macdonald
- Succeeded by: Robert Munro

Personal details
- Born: Charles Scott Dickson; 13 September 1850 Glasgow, Scotland
- Died: 5 August 1922 (aged 71) Arbigland, Scotland
- Resting place: Dean Cemetery
- Spouse: Hester Bagot Banks
- Relations: James Douglas Hamilton Dickson (brother)
- Education: University of Glasgow; University of Edinburgh
- Occupation: Politician; judge

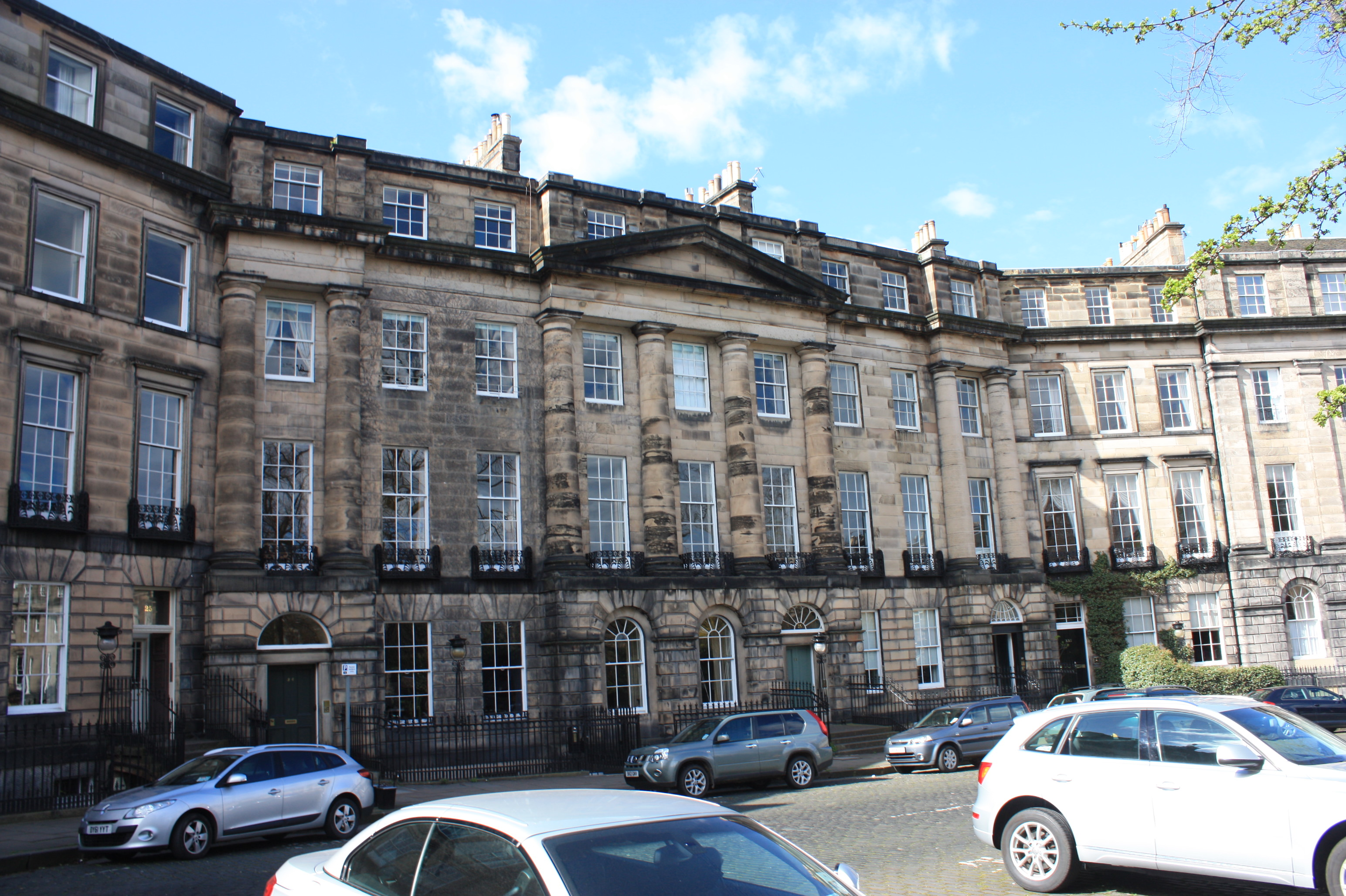
Scott Dickson had an impressive Georgian townhouse at 22 Moray Place in Edinburgh

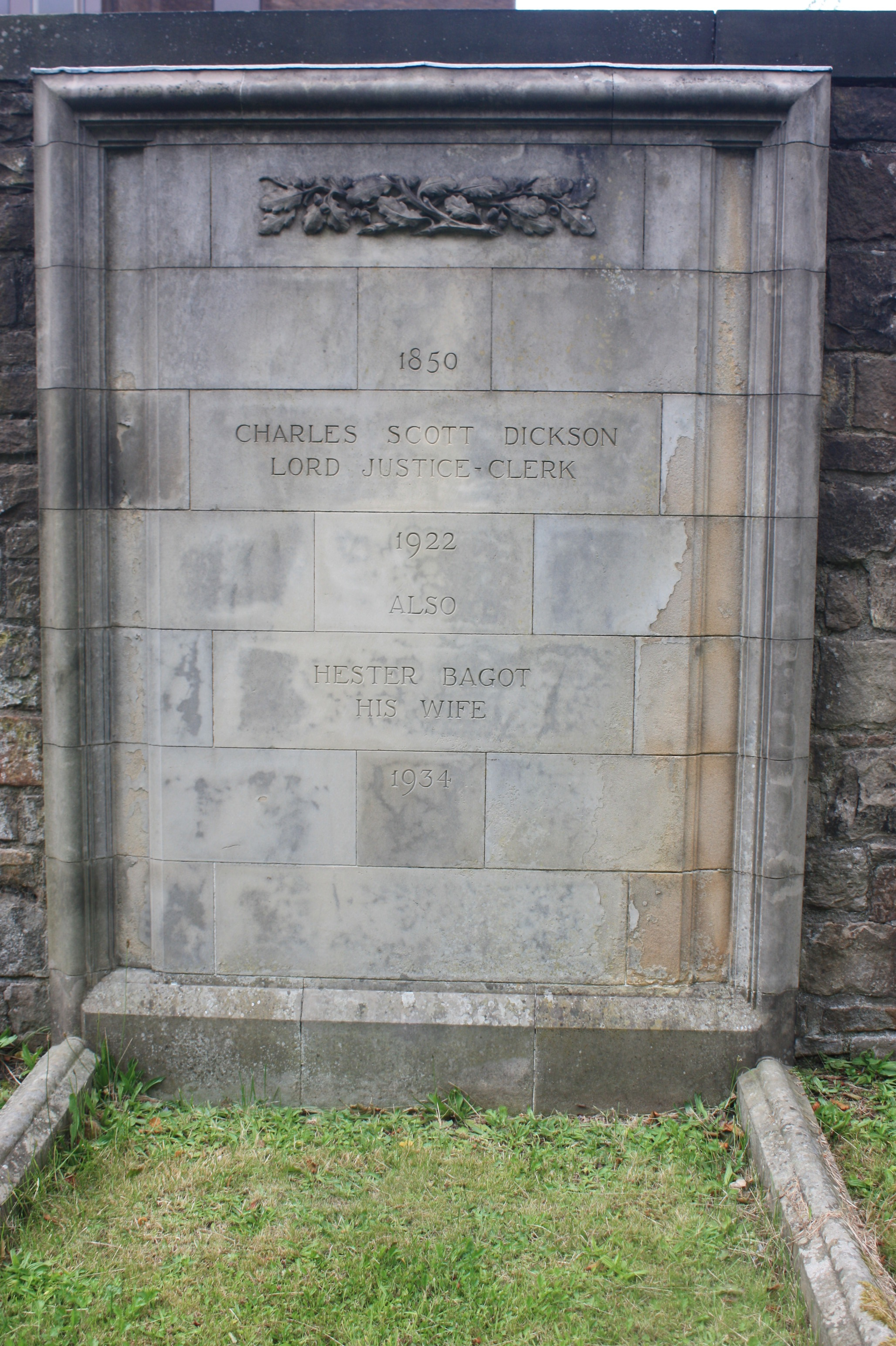
Grave of Charles Scott Dickson, Lord Dickson, Dean Cemetery

Charles Scott Dickson, Lord Dickson, FRSE (13 September 1850 – 5 August 1922) was a Scottish Unionist politician and judge.

== Early life and education ==
Charles was born in Glasgow the son of Dr John Robert Dickson. His elder brother was James Douglas Hamilton Dickson.

Educated at the High School of Glasgow, the University of Glasgow and the University of Edinburgh he was admitted to the bar as an advocate in 1877.

== Career ==
He was an unsuccessful candidate for Kilmarnock Burghs in 1892, and Glasgow Bridgeton in 1895 and 1897. He was elected to and sat for Bridgeton from 1900 until 1906, when he was defeated. He then sat for Glasgow Central from March 1909 until his appointment as a judge in 1915.

He rose to be Solicitor General for Scotland from 14 May 1896 to 1903 and as Lord Advocate from 1903 to 1905. From 1908 to 1915, he served as the elected Dean of the Faculty of Advocates. He was appointed a Privy Counsellor in 1903. On 1 July 1915 he was raised to the bench as Lord Justice Clerk, taking the judicial title Lord Dickson. He was also a Justice of the Peace and a Deputy Lord Lieutenant for Edinburgh.

He was elected a Fellow of the Royal Society of Edinburgh in 1884. His proposers were Sir James Dewar, John Chiene, Alexander Crum Brown, and Peter Guthrie Tait.

== Later life and death ==
In later life he lived at 22 Moray Place a huge Georgian townhouse on the Moray Estate in Edinburgh's affluent West End.

He died at Arbigland on 5 August 1922. He is buried in the 20th century extension to Dean Cemetery in Edinburgh with his wife Hester Bagot Banks (died 1934). The monument stands against the north wall.

He was related through marriage to Sir James Dewar (their wives were sisters).

Parliament of the United Kingdom
Preceded by Sir Charles Cameron	Member of Parliament for Glasgow Bridgeton; 1900–1906	Succeeded by James William Cleland
Preceded by Andrew Mitchell Torrance	Member of Parliament for Glasgow Central; 1909–1915	Succeeded by John McLeod
Legal offices
Preceded by Andrew Murray	Solicitor General for Scotland; 1896–1903	Succeeded by David Dundas
Preceded by Andrew Murray	Lord Advocate; 1903–1905	Succeeded by Thomas Shaw
Preceded by Lord Kingsburgh	Lord Justice Clerk; 1915–1922	Succeeded by Lord Alness
