= 1989 Glasgow Central by-election =

UK parliamentary by-election

- 15 June 1989

Constituency of Glasgow Central
- Turnout: 52.9% (▼12.7%)
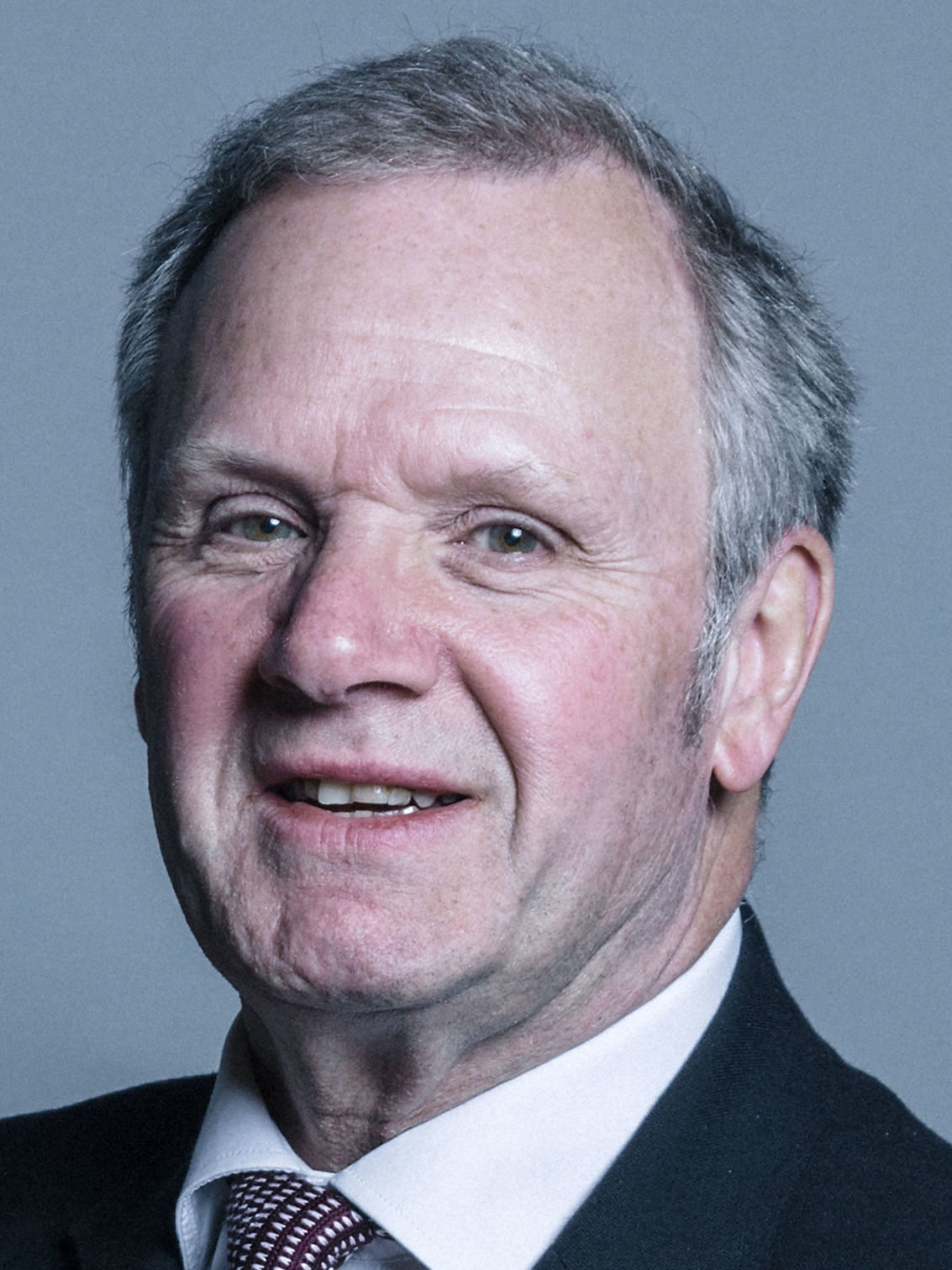

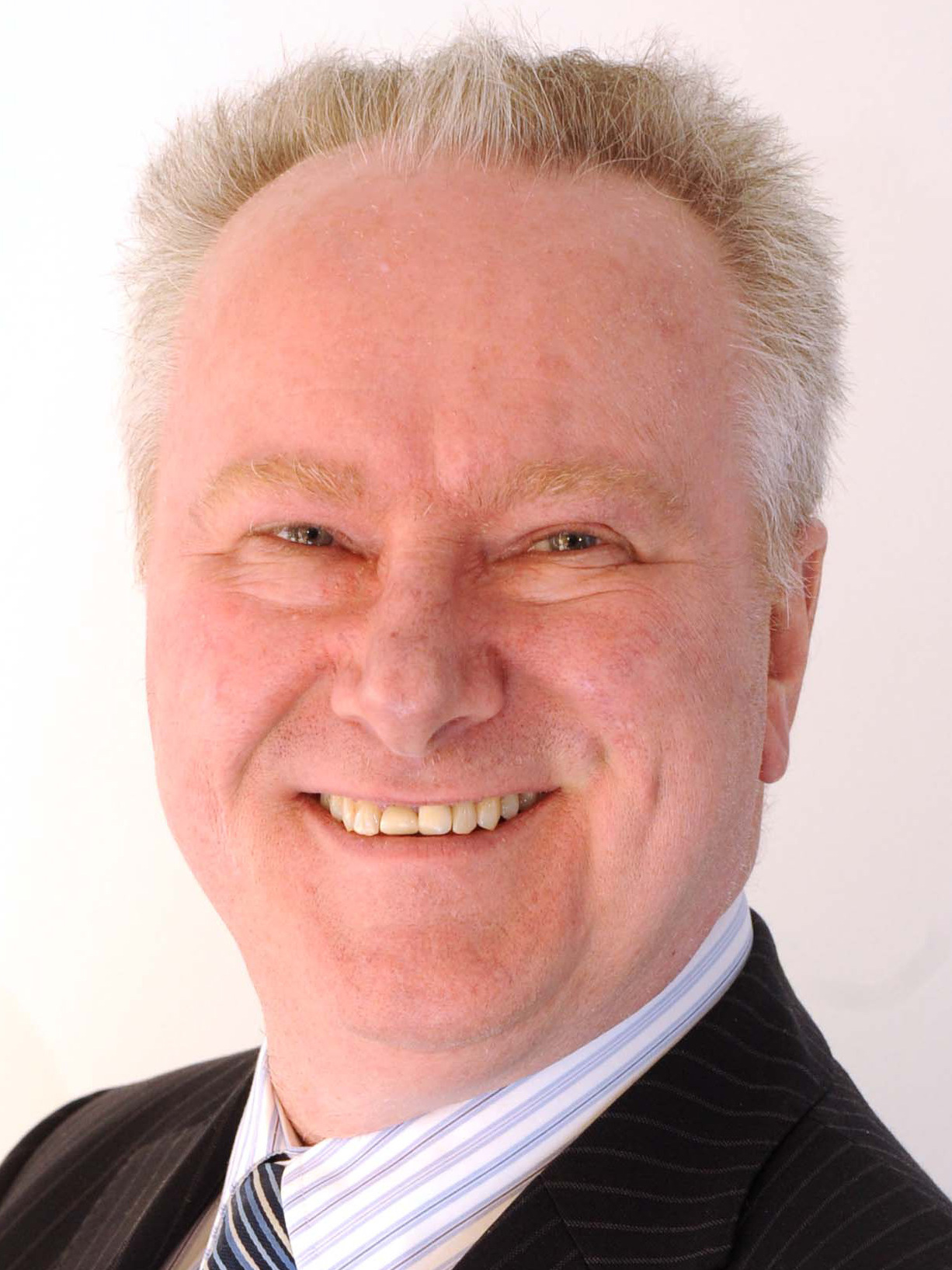
	First party	Second party	Third party
			Con
Candidate	Mike Watson	Alex Neil	Allan Hogarth
Party	Labour	SNP	Conservative
Popular vote	14,480	8,018	2,028
Percentage	54.6%	30.2%	7.6%
Swing	▼9.9%	▲20.3%	▼5.4%
MP before election
Bob McTaggart
Labour
Subsequent MP
Mike Watson
Labour

The 1989 Glasgow Central by-election, in the Glasgow Central constituency, was held on 15 June 1989. It was caused by the death of the sitting UK Member of Parliament, Bob McTaggart.

The Scottish National Party had high hopes of repeating their victory from the previous year at the by-election for the Glasgow Govan seat, where Jim Sillars gained the seat from Labour. For Glasgow Central, the SNP chose a close associate of their Govan victor Alex Neil. However, the hope for victory did not transpire for the SNP, as Mike Watson retained the seat for the Labour Party with a 6,462 majority, despite a 20.3% rise in the SNP share of the votes cast. The day after the election, The Glasgow Herald described the result as "the revenge" Labour sought for their by-election defeat in Govan 7 months earlier. The SNP blamed opinion polls in the latter stages of the election campaign which showed them trailing Labour, arguing these stalled their momentum. Winner Mike Watson argued that the result showed that "The SNP bandwagon is off the rails", although SNP spokesman Chris McLean denied that the result was a setback, pointing out that they had significantly increased their vote share.

The Liberal Democrats fell to fifth place, the worst position achieved by a major party at any British by-election since the 1976 Walsall North by-election. This was equalled in the Henley by-election in 2008, when Labour also fell to fifth, and surpassed in the Glasgow North East by-election in 2009, when the Liberal Democrats came sixth. Their 1.6% vote share remained the lowest percentage vote for the Liberal Democrats until they entered the Conservative-Liberal Democrat Coalition in 2010, and in fact was not beaten until the South Shields by-election three years into their time in government.

This was also the only parliamentary contest engaged in by the Scottish Socialist Party that existed at the time (which should not be confused with the present day Scottish Socialist Party). Their candidate was Bill Kidd.

== Result ==
Glasgow Central by-election, 1989
Party	Candidate	Votes	%	±%
Labour	Mike Watson	14,480	54.6	−9.9
SNP	Alex Neil	8,018	30.2	+20.3
Conservative	Allan Hogarth	2,028	7.6	−5.4
Green	Irene Brandt	1,019	3.8	+2.9
Liberal Democrats	Robert McCreadie	411	1.5	−9.0
SDP	Peter Kerr	253	1.0	N/A
Revolutionary Communist	Linda Murdoch	141	0.5	New
Scottish Socialist	Bill Kidd	137	0.5	New
Workers Revolutionary	David Lettice	48	0.2	New
Majority		6,462	24.4	−27.1
Turnout		26,535	52.9	−12.7
Labour hold		Swing	-15.1	

== Previous result ==
General Election 1987: Glasgow Central
Party	Candidate	Votes	%	±%
Labour	Bob McTaggart	21,619	64.5	+11.5
Conservative	Bernard Jenkin	4,366	13.0	−6.0
Liberal	John Bryden	3,528	10.5	−6.2
SNP	Alexander Wilson	3,339	10.0	−0.3
Green	Andrew Brooks	290	0.9	New
Communist	John McGoldrick	265	0.8	−0.3
Red Front	Derek Owen	126	0.4	New
Majority		17,253	51.5	+17.5
Turnout		33,533	65.6	+2.8
Labour hold		Swing		

== See also ==
- Glasgow Central (UK Parliament constituency)
- Elections in Scotland
- List of United Kingdom by-elections
