= Mike Watson, Baron Watson of Invergowrie =

British politician (born 1949)

The Right Honourable The Lord Watson of Invergowrie
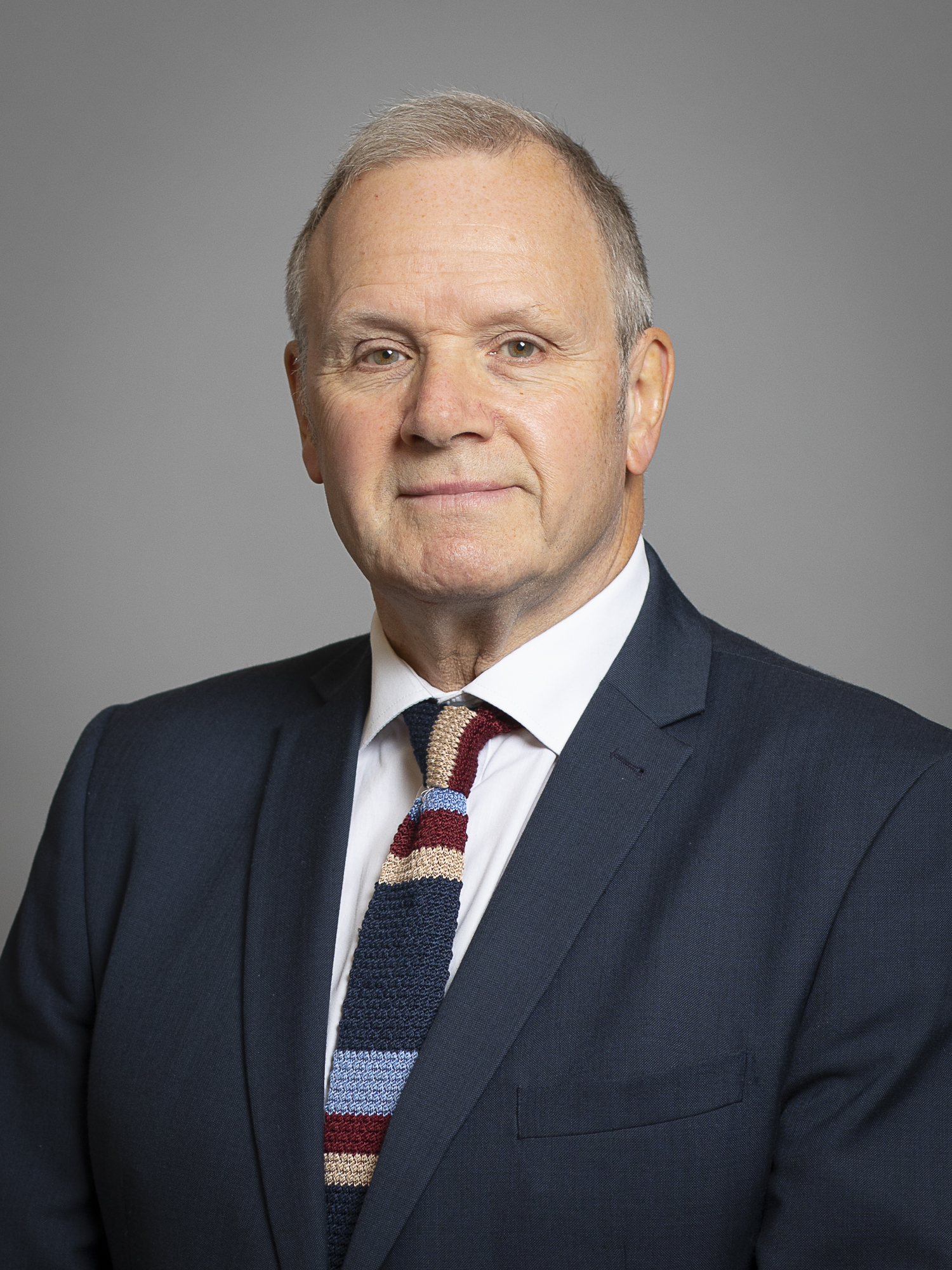
- Watson in 2020

Shadow Minister for Education
- In office 18 September 2015 – 28 April 2022
- Leader: Jeremy Corbyn; Keir Starmer

Minister for Culture and Sport
- In office 22 November 2001 – 20 May 2003
- First Minister: Jack McConnell
- Preceded by: Sam Galbraith
- Succeeded by: Frank McAveety

Member of the House of Lords
- Lord Temporal
- Life peerage 6 November 1997

Member of the Scottish Parliament for Glasgow Cathcart
- In office 6 May 1999 – 22 September 2005
- Preceded by: Constituency established
- Succeeded by: Charlie Gordon

Member of Parliament for Glasgow Central
- In office 15 June 1989 – 8 April 1997
- Preceded by: Bob McTaggart
- Succeeded by: Constituency abolished

Personal details
- Born: 1 May 1949 (age 77) Cambuslang, Lanarkshire, Scotland
- Party: Scottish Labour Party
- Education: Heriot-Watt University
- Occupation: Politician

Michael Goodall Watson, Baron Watson of Invergowrie (born 1 May 1949), is a British Labour Party politician. He has served in two legislatures in the United Kingdom and served as Minister for Culture and Sport in the Scottish Executive Cabinet, and is a convicted criminal.

Watson was expelled from his party on 22 September 2005 following his conviction and imprisonment for fire-raising at Prestonfield House, but was re-admitted to the Labour Party in July 2012. He currently sits as a Labour member of the House of Lords and is an Associate Director of the Edinburgh public affairs and communications company Caledonia Consulting.

On 18 September 2015, the new Labour leader Jeremy Corbyn appointed Watson as Education spokesman in the House of Lords.

== Early life ==
Watson was born in Cambuslang, South Lanarkshire, but his family moved to Invergowrie, Perth and Kinross when he was very young. He was educated at Invergowrie Primary School, the High School of Dundee and Heriot-Watt University, Edinburgh, graduating with a B.A. Hons in Economics and Industrial Relations in 1974.

Prior to entering politics Watson worked as a tutor/organiser for the Workers' Educational Association and in the trade union movement, for the Association of Scientific, Technical and Managerial Staffs (ASTMS) and the Manufacturing, Science and Finance union (MSF).

== Political career ==
Watson was elected to the Parliament of the United Kingdom as the Member of Parliament (MP) for Glasgow Central at a by-election in 1989, following the death of Bob McTaggart MP. He was re-elected in the 1992 election and represented that constituency until it was abolished in 1997. He sought the nomination from the Labour party to run for the Govan seat at the 1997 election, but after initially winning the nomination by one vote, he lost a re-run to Mohammad Sarwar.

On 6 November 1997, he was created a life peer as Baron Watson of Invergowrie, of Invergowrie in Perth and Kinross.

In 1999 Lord Watson was elected as the Member of the Scottish Parliament (MSP) for the Glasgow Cathcart constituency and was re-elected in 2003. On 20 July 1999 Watson announced his intention to introduce the Protection of Wild Mammals bill as a member's bill to the Scottish Parliament to outlaw fox hunting. The bill passed a vote 83–36 on 13 February 2002 and received Royal Assent on 15 March, becoming the Protection of Wild Mammals (Scotland) Act 2002 and becoming law on 1 August. This was a precursor to the Hunting Act 2004 banning fox hunting in England and Wales.

When Jack McConnell became First Minister in 2001, Watson entered the Scottish Executive as Minister for Tourism, Culture and Sport. He left the Executive in 2003, having lost his position in a reshuffle after the 2003 election. He subsequently became deputy convener of the enterprise and culture committee.

On 15 November 2004, Watson was charged with wilful fire raising, and the Labour whip was withdrawn from him in the Holyrood and Westminster parliaments. On 1 September 2005 he admitted the offence and resigned from the Scottish Parliament. Watson was also expelled from the Labour Party when the sentence was announced. After serving a prison sentence he was released in May 2006.

In January 2007 Watson was appointed as an Associate Director with Caledonia Consulting, while also attending the House of Lords on a regular basis. Watson was re-admitted to membership of the Labour Party in July 2012, after a vote of the National Executive Committee. In September 2015, Jeremy Corbyn appointed Watson as the Labour spokesman on education in the Lords.

Watson has chaired the Secondary Legislation Scrutiny Committee since January 2025.

== Fire-raising conviction ==
On 15 November 2004, Lord Watson was charged with two counts of "wilful fire raising" after a private reception at Edinburgh's Prestonfield Hotel following the Scottish Politician of the Year awards on 11 November. The first alleged that he set fire to a curtain in the hotel's reception, and the second that he set fire to a curtain in the hotel's Yellow Room. On being charged, the Labour whip was suspended in the Holyrood and Westminster parliaments.

After initially registering not guilty pleas to both charges on 23 August 2005, he changed his plea on 1 September to guilty on the first count, and had a not guilty plea accepted on the second charge.

On the same day that Lord Watson admitted his guilt, he resigned from the Scottish Parliament. He resigned as a director of Dundee United Football Club. It was not possible for a life peer to resign from the House of Lords at that time and there was no provision for peers convicted of criminal offences to be stripped of their titles. Such legislation was last proposed following the conviction of Jeffrey Archer for perjury in 2001, but rejected. The House of Lords Reform Act 2014 made resignation possible.

On 22 September 2005, Lord Watson was sentenced to 16 months' imprisonment. Sheriff Kathrine Mackie justified the sentence, stating that there was both "a significant risk of re-offending" and that Lord Watson offered no explanation. She also told Lord Watson that consumption of alcohol "neither excuses nor fully explains your behaviour". The sentence was reduced from 20 months to 16 because Watson had pleaded guilty before the case reached trial. Watson appealed against his sentence on 23 March 2006 but the appeal judges refused to cut the term, and he was returned to prison. After serving half of his sentence (eight months), he was released on 23 May 2006.

== Bibliography ==
- Watson, Mike (1985). Rags to Riches: The official history of Dundee United. David Winter & Sons, Dundee ISBN 978-0-902804-18-0
- Watson, Mike (1992). Rags to Riches (updated version). David Winter & Sons, Dundee ISBN 978-0-902804-18-0
- Watson, Mike (1997). The Tannadice Encyclopedia. Mainstream, Edinburgh ISBN 1-85158-996-1
- Watson, Mike (2001). Year Zero: An Inside View of the Scottish Parliament. Polygon at Edinburgh. ISBN 1-902930-26-6.
- Watson, Mike and Rundo, Peter (2009). Dundee United: The Official Centenary History. Birlinn, Edinburgh. ISBN 978-1-84158-828-5

Parliament of the United Kingdom
Preceded by Bob McTaggart	Member of Parliament for Glasgow Central; 1989–1997	Constituency abolished
Scottish Parliament
New parliament Scotland Act 1998	Member of the Scottish Parliament for Glasgow Cathcart; 1999–2005	Succeeded by Charlie Gordon
Political offices
New office	Minister for Tourism, Culture and Sport; 2001–2003	Succeeded by Frank McAveety
Preceded by Alasdair Morrison	Minister for Gaelic; 2001–2003	Succeeded by Peter Peacock
Orders of precedence in the United Kingdom
Preceded by The Lord Simpson of Dunkeld	Gentlemen; Baron Watson of Invergowrie	Followed by The Lord Ryder of Wensum
