= Charles Campbell MacLeod =

Scottish merchant

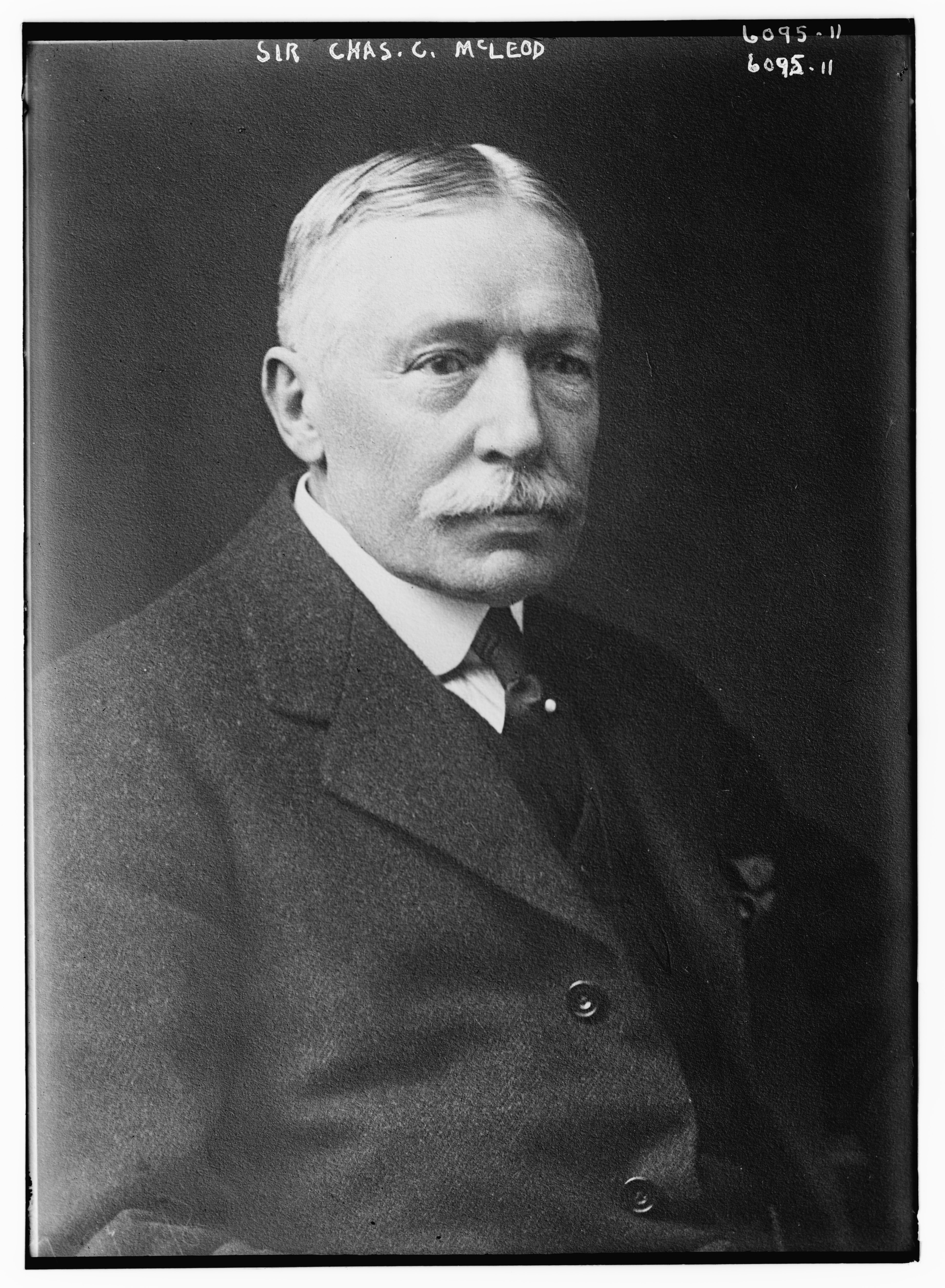
Sir Charles C. McLeod, 1st Baronet

Sir Charles Campbell McLeod, 1st Baronet (19 June 1858 — 2 October 1936) was a Scottish merchant. He was chairman of the National Bank of India and of the Imperial Tea Company, and chairman of the Royal Colonial Institute. He was knighted in 1917 and made a baronet in 1925.

McLeod was born in North Uist, the son of Rev. Norman McLeod of Paible and Julia McLeod. He married Mary Louisa Cayley (1865—1951), daughter of Surgeon-General Henry Cayley. They had one son and one daughter. He died at his home, Falcon Close, in Woolton Hill, Newbury, and was succeeded by his son, Murdoch Campbell MacLeod.

== See also ==
- MacLeod baronets

Baronetage of the United Kingdom
New creation	Baronet (of The Fairfields); 1925–1936	Succeeded by Murdoch MacLeod
