= Tommy Graham (Scottish politician) =

Scottish politician (1943–2015)

Member of Parliament for Renfrewshire West Renfrew West and Inverclyde (1987–1997)
- In office 11 June 1987 – 14 May 2001
- Preceded by: Anna McCurley
- Succeeded by: Jim Sheridan

Personal details
- Born: 5 December 1943
- Died: 16 April 2015 (aged 71) Paisley
- Party: Labour (until 1998); Independent (from 1998)

Thomas Graham (5 December 1943 – 16 April 2015) was a Scottish Labour Party politician who was the Member of Parliament (MP) for Renfrewshire West, previously Renfrew West and Inverclyde, from 1987 to 2001. A native of Glasgow, Graham worked as an engineer before serving on Strathclyde Regional Council from 1978 to 1987.

== Early and parliamentary career ==
Graham previously worked for Rolls-Royce as an engineer and as a shop steward for the engineering union AEEU.

He was elected in 1987 as the Member of Parliament (MP) for Renfrew West and Inverclyde, defeating the Conservative incumbent Anna McCurley. Following favourable boundary changes in 1997, he was elected for the new seat of Renfrewshire West.

== McMaster suicide ==
Following the suicide of his parliamentary colleague Gordon McMaster in July 1997, a long investigation was launched, since in his suicide note McMaster had accused Graham of smearing him that he had a homosexual affair with a 17-year-old employee of Graham's, called Scott Anderson. In September 1998, Graham was expelled from the Labour Party for "bringing the party into disrepute", despite his categorical denials of any wrongdoing. He became an independent and described himself as a 'Scottish Labour' MP.

Following his expulsion when Graham was asked where he would be sitting in the House of Commons, he replied, 'On my bum.' In fact, he actually sat on the opposition benches of the Commons but continued to vote with the government on many issues. It was thought that Graham would stand again at the 2001 general election, but he did not do so and quietly retired. His successor was Labour's Jim Sheridan. He died on 16 April 2015 following a brief illness.

Parliament of the United Kingdom
Preceded by Anna McCurley	Member of Parliament for Renfrew West and Inverclyde; 1987–1997	constituency abolished
New constituency	Member of Parliament for Renfrewshire West; 1997–2001	Succeeded by Jim Sheridan
