= James McInnes =

Scottish politician

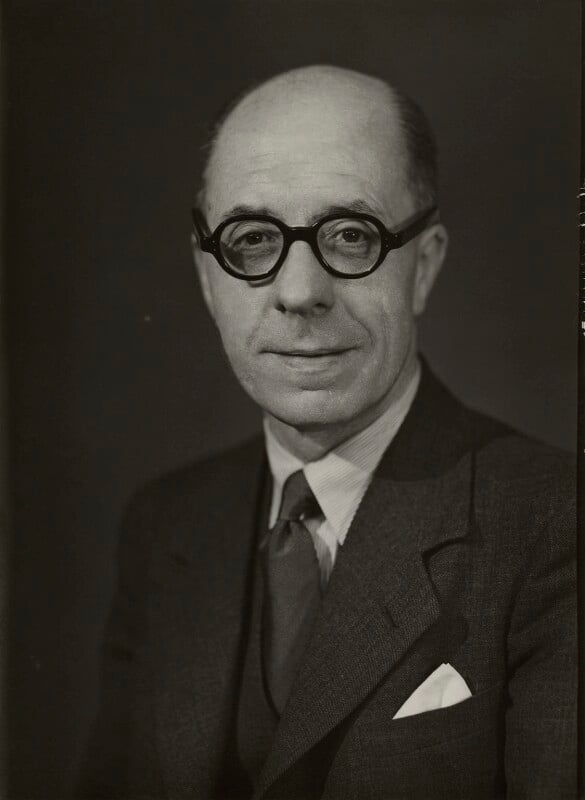
McInnes in 1950

James McInnes (19 May 1901 – 14 April 1974) was a Scottish politician.

Born in Newry, McInnes was educated at Glasgow Secondary School, and then became a railway clerk. He joined the Labour Party, serving on Glasgow Town Council from 1933 until 1950, and was leader of the Labour group on the council for his final year. In 1938, he chaired the Scottish Council of the Labour Party.

McInnes stood unsuccessfully in Glasgow Pollok at the 1935 United Kingdom general election, and then in Glasgow Central at the 1945 United Kingdom general election. He won the seat at the 1950 United Kingdom general election, serving until his retirement in 1966.

Parliament of the United Kingdom
Preceded by Sir James Hutchison	Member of Parliament for Glasgow Central; 1950–1966	Succeeded by Thomas McMillan
