= Alexander Murison =

Scottish academic

- Born: March 3, 1847; New Deer, Scotland
- Died: June 8, 1934; Clapham Common, London
- Education: Aberdeen Grammar School, University of Aberdeen
- Occupations: Professor of Roman law and jurisprudence
- Employer(s): University College London, University of Oxford

Alexander Falconer Murison (3 March 1847 – 8 June 1934) was a Scottish academic who was professor of Roman law and jurisprudence at University College, London and at the University of Oxford. He was a prolific writer for newspapers and journals in a wide variety of subjects with comparatively few publications in his specialism of Roman Law.

He collated the text of Theophilus' Greek paraphrasis of Justinian's Institutes but failed to finish his extensive work in this field. However, his translation of Theophilus was published in 2010 as the parallel English text accompanying the Greek in the new edition. He also wrote two biographical works in Scottish history: Sir William Wallace (1898) and King Robert the Bruce (1899) in the Famous Scots Series published by Oliphant, Anderson and Ferrier. Lack of money took him into journalism and he was editor of the Educational Times (now the Times Educational Supplement) from 1902 to 1912 and on the staff of the Daily Chronicle. He even had time to enter politics and he stood as a Liberal Party candidate in at least three General Elections: for the Glasgow and Aberdeen Universities constituency in 1906 and for the Glasgow Central constituency in January 1910 and December 1910, and lost on all three occasions to a Conservative candidate.

Murison died on 8 June 1934 at his home in Clapham Common, London.

== Origins in Scotland ==
Murison was born at New Deer, Aberdeenshire, Scotland on 3 March 1847. He was born to a crofting family and looked after cattle as a boy. He won a bursary to Aberdeen Grammar School where he excelled and won a scholarship to the University of Aberdeen. After achieving a first class honours M.A. degree in classics, he returned to his old school and was an English Master there from 1869 to 1876. He married Elizabeth Logan in 1870 and they had two children, Alexander Logan (1871–1948) and Sir James William Murison (1872–1945), who became Chief Justice of the Straits Settlements.

== Collections ==
University College London Special Collections holds Murison's personal archive which includes correspondence, manuscript and working papers, and translations. The collection spans 100 volumes and covers the years 1897 - 1923.

== Academic career in London and Oxford ==
- 1876–81: Moved to London in 1876 and enrolled as trainee barrister in the Middle Temple and was called to the bar in 1881.
- 1881–83: Earned his living as a teacher, journalist, and legal practice before the Privy Council and the Chancery Division.
- 1883–1925: Professor of Roman Law and later of Jurisprudence at University College, London.
- 1912–24: Dean of the Faculty of Laws and member of the senate of the University of London. Also, in 1915, he became deputy reader in Roman Law at Oxford and then deputy professor of civil law in 1916.
- 1925–34: Years of retirement and journalism.

== Selected bibliography ==
- First Work in English: Grammar and Composition Taught by a Comparative Study of Equivalent Forms, Oxford University, 1875
- The Globe Readers, Books One to Five, London: Macmillan & Co., 1881–84.
- "A short history of Roman law" in W.A. Hunter, A Systematic and Historical Exposition of Roman Law in the Order of a Code, 2nd edition (London, 1885) 1–121 [repr. in 3rd ed. 1897; 4th ed. 1903]; usually referred to as "The External History of Roman Law"
- "Lex Dei," Classical Review 27 (1913) 274–277 [review of M. Hyamson, Mosicarum et Romanarum Legum Collatio (London, 1913)]
- W.A. Hunter (revised and enlarged by A.F. Murison), Introduction to Roman Law, 8th edition (London, 1921)
- Horace rendered in English verse (London, 1931)
- The Bucolics & Georgics of Vergil rendered in English hexameters (London, 1932)
- The Odes of Pindar rendered in English verse (London, 1933)
- The Iliad of Homer rendered in English hexameters, vol.1: Books I-XII (London, 1933)
- "The law in the Latin poets," in Atti del Congresso Internazionale di diritto romano: Roma 2 (Pavia, 1935) 607–639
- Schiller's Wallenstein: A Dramatic Poem rendered into English Verse. Translated by Alexander Falconer Murison. London: Longmans, Green & Co., 1931.

== Sources ==
- Murison, Alexander Falconer; Murison, Alexander Logan; Murison, James William (1935), Memoirs of 88 years (1847–1934) : being the autobiography of Alexander Falconer Murison, Aberdeen University Press, OCLC 614426864
- Theophilus, Antecessor; Lokin, J H A; Murison, A F (2010), Theophili Antecessoris paraphrasis institutionum, ISBN 978-90-76892-19-1, archived from the original on 24 July 2011
