= John George Alexander Baird =

British politician

John George Alexander Baird (1854–1917) was Unionist MP for Glasgow Central. He was a younger son of the industrialist and landowner William Baird of Elie House and Janet Johnstone.

Baird was educated at Eton and Christ Church, Oxford.

He first stood for the seat in 1885, won it in 1886, but lost it narrowly in 1906.

Baird served as a lieutenant of the 16th Lancers. He was later Lieutenant-colonel of the Ayrshire (Earl of Carrick's Own) Imperial Yeomanry.

He inherited the Muirkirk estate in Ayrshire from his uncle James Baird, upon which he built a mansion called Wellwood House, and later acquired Colstoun House in East Lothian through his wife Susan Georgina Fergusson. The daughter of Sir James Fergusson, 6th Baronet and Lady Edith Christian Ramsay, she had inherited the property through her paternal great-grandmother Christian Ramsay, Countess of Dalhousie (née Broun of Colstoun).

Parliament of the United Kingdom
Preceded by Gilbert Beith	Member of Parliament for Glasgow Central; 1886–1906	Succeeded by Andrew Mitchell Torrance
