= Scottish Parliament Business Exchange =

The Scottish Parliament Business Exchange (SPBE) was a charity in Scotland created to develop a greater understanding between the business world and Members of the Scottish Parliament (MSPs). Set up in 2001, it closed in April 2016.

== History ==
The SPBE was established in June 2001, and was promoted as an educational exchange allowing members of the Scottish Parliament to learn more about all kinds of businesses.

From its earliest days, there was debate about its activities and funding. It was criticised by transparency campaigners, including SNP MSP Tricia Marwick, who believed its fee-based system created preferential access to Holyrood. Its activities and reporting systems were repeatedly discussed by the Parliament's Standards Committee; in 2002 it was condemned for failing to "provide sufficient transparency or accountability." In November 2003 the Committee was "unconvinced" there were "adequate safeguards in place" to ensure the SPBE's commitment of being "non-lobbying". The SPBE was also criticised after a Labour MSP who took part in one of the schemes was asked to sign a confidentiality agreement by a participating company (Pfizer).

Corporate participants were required to sign a letter affirming they would not use the scheme for lobbying. In practice the SPBE was dominated by corporations who paid up to £7,500 to join, and three-quarters of those taking part in its first round of activities were full-time lobbyists. It was the Scottish 'chapter' of the International Association of Business and Parliament, a company (2004-2014) based in London.

In January 2007 it was announced that Devin Scobie of Caledonia Consulting had been appointed as the interim executive director of the SPBE (Companies House records show he was appointed as SPBE's secretary on 29 January 2007). Scobie was a former lobbyist with GPC International and had represented SPBE members such as Pfizer as clients. His role at SPBE reportedly ended in 2008 (Companies House records show this change on 4 January 2008).

In 2009, the Sunday Herald revealed that the SPBE was in deficit and received a £30,000 cash injection from Holyrood on top of other funding.

Under a new chief executive, Arthur McIvor, the SPBE developed a better reputation. However, in March 2016 Holyrood’s governing corporate body decided against renewing its annual £20,000 a year membership. As a result, the SPBE announced in April 2016 that it closing down.
