= Bob McTaggart =

Scottish politician (1945–1989)

Member of Parliament for Glasgow Central
- In office 26 June 1980 – 23 March 1989
- Preceded by: Thomas McMillan
- Succeeded by: Mike Watson

Personal details
- Born: 2 November 1945 Glasgow, Scotland
- Died: 23 March 1989 (aged 43) London, England
- Party: Labour
- Spouse: Elizabeth Jardine (m. 1966)
- Children: 2
- Education: Holyrood Secondary School

Robert McTaggart (2 November 1945 – 23 March 1989) was a Scottish politician who served as a Member of Parliament (MP) for Glasgow Central, representing the Labour Party. McTaggart was on the left of his party, and took up issues of unemployment and poor housing which affected his constituency. He also took a particular interest in international affairs, being a supporter of the Palestine Liberation Organization and visiting Libya, North Korea and the Soviet Union. McTaggart died of a sudden heart attack at the age of 43.

== Early life ==
McTaggart was born in Glasgow, his father also being called Robert. He attended St Constantine and St Bartholomew primary schools, followed by Holyrood Secondary School.

At the age of 16 he left school and was apprenticed to be marine plumber at the Fairfield Shipbuilding and Engineering Company, and worked for five years in this job, through the period of the Upper Clyde Shipbuilders work-in. From 1968 to 1972 he was a trigonometrical calculator at the Govan shipyard, then becoming a Pipework planner. McTaggart joined the Electrical, Electronic, Telecommunications and Plumbing Union and was the EETPU shop steward what then became Govan Shipbuilders from 1971 to 1977.

== Politics ==
After joining the Labour Party in 1969, McTaggart held a series of posts within the local Labour Party organisation where he lived. He was successively chairman of the Partick East Labour Party branch, Secretary of Townhead Labour Party branch, and a member of Glasgow Kelvingrove Constituency Labour Party Executive Committee. In 1974 he was elected to Glasgow Corporation, serving for only one year before local government was reformed. He was elected to Glasgow District Council as a councillor for the Anderston ward in the 1977 local elections. As a member of the licensing committee in December 1979, he resisted suggestions that the committee watch Monty Python's Life of Brian to consider whether to ban it from city cinemas.

== Glasgow Central ==
In preparation for the 1979 general election, McTaggart became agent for Glasgow Central Constituency Labour Party. The campaign he organised won the seat, but McTaggart's friend Thomas McMillan, MP died from head injuries sustained when he fell from a bus in Parliament Square in April 1980. McTaggart was selected as his successor on 3 June. He fought the by-election resulting from McMillan's death by concentrating on national issues and especially attacked unemployment. The constituency was the smallest in Britain and had some of the worst economic problems, and when McTaggart won with a majority of 2,780 over the Scottish National Party on a low turnout, it was regarded as a poor result. McTaggart declared that "it was the result we were looking for".

== Parliamentary activity ==
Making his maiden speech on 10 July 1980 in an opposition debate on industry, McTaggart attacked the Conservative government's economic policy, claiming that non-intervention "fanned the flames of unemployment in Glasgow" and had caused the loss of 300 jobs each day. In November 1981 he supported an increased borrowing limit for British Shipbuilders, urging that it set up a fund to take on new apprentices. McTaggart was one of 33 Labour MPs to vote against the Government in a debate on the Falklands War in May 1982, defying party instructions to abstain.

Boundary changes at the 1983 general election split the Glasgow Central seat four ways, and it constituted less than a quarter of the electorate of a new seat of the same name. McTaggart faced a reselection battle with Helen McElhone who was the MP for Glasgow Queen's Park which made up more than half of the new seat. He won a decisive victory at the selection contest held on 13 May 1983, just after the election had been called, and went on to win the seat by a 10,962 vote majority.

In November 1985, McTaggart opposed televising proceedings in the House of Commons, but by March 1988 he had changed his mind and voted in favour.

=== Labour Party politics ===
McTaggart was sponsored by his union, the EETPU, which paid £600 to his Constituency Labour Party and 80% of his election expenses. The union leadership was strongly aligned with the right in internal Labour Party debates and its leader Frank Chapple supported Denis Healey in the Deputy Leadership election in 1981. When McTaggart voted for the left-wing candidate Tony Benn, his EETPU sponsorship was withdrawn. He appealed unsuccessfully against the decision. Initially a member of the Tribune Group, he was one of the founding members of the Socialist Campaign Group in November 1982, and in the same month spoke at a Glasgow meeting called by supporters of the Militant tendency opposing the expulsions of the members of the editorial board of Militant newspaper. He supported the left-wing team of Eric Heffer for Leader and Michael Meacher for Deputy Leader in the Leadership election in 1983. McTaggart was one of a group of some 30 Labour left-wingers who mounted a demonstration on the floor of the House of Commons in November 1984 against the Government's reduction in benefits to the wives of strikers; the Speaker was forced to adjourn the sitting.

=== International affairs ===
Throughout his time in Parliament, McTaggart showed an interest in visiting foreign countries. He was a guest of the North Korean government in visiting the country in September 1980, and of the Palestine Liberation Organization in visiting Jordan, the West Bank and Lebanon in January and February 1981. He urged recognition of the PLO as the "legitimate representative" of Palestinian people and pledged support for Palestinian "inalienable rights" in April 1983. After visiting Libya in 1983, he was due to go to the Libyan People's Bureau in London on the day that WPC Yvonne Fletcher was shot in April 1984; his offer to help negotiate with the Libyans was declined by the police at the ensuing siege. He was part of a Labour Action for Peace delegation to Moscow earlier in 1984.

== Domestic issues ==
Glasgow Central included the historic centre of the city and McTaggart lived in a council house near the city centre; it expanded south of the River Clyde in 1983 to include Hutchesontown, where there were many tower blocks in poor condition. McTaggart backed a bid from the New Gorbals Trust charity to buy and demolish the Hutchesontown E block in 1985. He criticised the Scottish Office minister Michael Ancram for calling on local authorities to remove asbestos from buildings but refusing to give them the money to do so.

He was re-elected with a 17,253 majority in the 1987 general election, having achieved an 8.7% swing to Labour. McTaggart was chairman of the all-party Scottish Penal Affairs Committee, where he worked quietly for improvements in prison conditions. After a series of prison disturbances, including one at Perth jail where a prison officer was taken hostage for 17 hours, he pointed to poor morale among prison officers and urged improvements in the parole system which he claimed were at the root of the problem. He raised cases of alleged mistreatment of prisoners, and called for model prisoners to be released early.

== Sudden death ==
In the deputy leadership election of 1988, McTaggart endorsed John Prescott rather than the further left Socialist Campaign Group candidate Eric Heffer. Owing to rule changes in the Labour Party requiring that a woman be shortlisted for every Parliamentary selection, he expected to be challenged for reselection by Ann Henderson, an NUR delegate who was associated with a left-wing group who had removed most of his supporters from offices within the Glasgow Central Constituency Labour Party.

On 23 March 1989 McTaggart collapsed and died while on a London Underground train to Heathrow. It was confirmed that he had had a heart attack. McTaggart married Elizabeth Jardine in February 1966; they had a son and two daughters.

Parliament of the United Kingdom
Preceded by Thomas McMillan	Member of Parliament for Glasgow Central; 1980 – 1989	Succeeded by Mike Watson
