= Renfrew West and Inverclyde =

UK Parliament constituency (1983–1997)

- Former county constituency for the House of Commons
- Subdivisions of Scotland: Renfrewshire

1983–1997
- Seats: One
- Created from: West Renfrewshire
- Replaced by: West Renfrewshire

Renfrew West and Inverclyde was a constituency of the House of Commons of the Parliament of the United Kingdom from 1983 to 1997.

The constituency was created out of, and merged back into, the West Renfrewshire constituency.

== Boundaries ==
The Renfrew District electoral divisions of Bargarran and Gryffe, and the Inverclyde District wards of Cardwell Bay, Firth, Gourock, and Kilmacolm.

== Members of Parliament ==
Election	Member	Party
1983	Anna McCurley	Conservative
1987	Tommy Graham	Labour
1997	constituency abolished. See West Renfrewshire	

== Election results ==
=== Elections of the 1980s ===
General election 1983: Renfrew West and Inverclyde
Party	Candidate	Votes	%	±%
Conservative	Anna McCurley	13,669	32.7	+0.5
SDP	Dickson Mabon	12,347	29.5	+11.2
Labour	George Doherty	12,139	29.0	−7.7
SNP	William Taylor	3,653	8.8	−4.0
Majority		1,322	3.2	
Turnout		41,808	78.1	
Conservative win (new seat)				

General election 1987: Renfrew West and Inverclyde
Party	Candidate	Votes	%	±%
Labour	Tommy Graham	17,525	38.7	+9.7
Conservative	Anna McCurley	13,472	29.8	−2.9
SDP	Dickson Mabon	9,669	21.4	−8.1
SNP	Colin McIver Campbell	4,578	10.1	+1.3
Majority		4,053	8.9	N/A
Turnout		45,244	80.5	+2.4
Labour gain from Conservative		Swing	+6.3	

=== Elections of the 1990s ===
General election 1992: Renfrew West and Inverclyde
Party	Candidate	Votes	%	±%
Labour	Tommy Graham	17,085	36.6	−2.1
Conservative	Annabel Goldie	15,341	32.9	+3.1
SNP	Colin McIver Campbell	9,444	20.2	+10.1
Liberal Democrats	Alexander Nimmo	4,668	10.0	−11.4
Natural Law	Duncan Lamont Maltman	149	0.3	New
Majority		1,744	3.7	−5.2
Turnout		46,687	80.3	−0.2
Labour hold		Swing	−2.6	
