= Glasgow Central (UK Parliament constituency) =

UK Parliament constituency (1885–1997; 2005–2024)

- Former burgh constituency for the House of Commons
- Boundary of Glasgow Central in Scotland
- Subdivision: Glasgow City
- Major settlements: Bridgeton, Dalmarnock, Dumbreck, Glasgow, Pollokshields

2005–2024
- Created from: Glasgow Govan; Glasgow Kelvin; Glasgow Shettleston; Glasgow Pollok; Glasgow Rutherglen
- Replaced by: Glasgow East; Glasgow North; Glasgow North East; Glasgow South; Glasgow South West

1885–1997
- Seats: One
- Type of constituency: Burgh constituency
- Created from: Glasgow
- Replaced by: Glasgow Cathcart, Glasgow Govan, Glasgow Kelvin, Glasgow Shettleston and Glasgow Springburn

Glasgow Central was a constituency of the House of Commons of the Parliament of the United Kingdom until 2024. A Glasgow Central constituency existed from 1885 until its abolition in 1997. Prior to the 2005 general election, boundary changes led to a new constituency named Glasgow Central being introduced. The constituency was abolished again prior to the 2024 general election. Prior to its abolition, the seat was held by Alison Thewliss of the Scottish National Party (SNP). The first iteration of this constituency was the seat of the former Conservative Prime Minister Bonar Law, who was the shortest-serving UK Prime Minister of the twentieth century.

== Boundaries ==
Map of boundaries 2005-2024

1885–1918: The Seventh, Eighth, Ninth, Twelfth, and Thirteenth Municipal Wards.

1918–1950: "That portion of the city which is bounded by a line commencing at a point at the intersection of the centre lines of Parliamentary Road and Castle Street, thence southward along the centre line of Castle Street to the centre line of Alexandra Parade, thence eastward along the centre line of Alexandra Parade to the centre line of Firpark Street, thence southward along the centre line of Firpark Street and Ark Lane to the centre line of Duke Street, thence westward along the centre line of Duke Street to the centre line of Sydney Street, thence southward along the centre line of Sydney Street to the centre line of Gallowgate, thence westward along the centre line of Gallowgate to the centre line of Saltmarket, thence southward along the centre line of Saltmarket and Albert Bridge to the centre line of the River Clyde, thence westward along the centre line of the River Clyde to a point in line with the centre line of McAlpine Street, thence northward along the centre line of McAlpine Street, Pitt Street and Scott Street to the centre line of New City Road, thence south-eastward along the centre line of New City Road and Cowcaddens to the centre line of Buchanan Street, thence southward along the centre line of Buchanan Street to the centre line of Parliamentary Road, thence north-eastward along the centre line of Parliamentary Road to the point of commencement."

1950–1975: The Exchange and Townhead wards of the county of the city of Glasgow.

1955–1974: The Cowcaddens and Townhead wards of the county of the city of Glasgow, and part of Exchange ward.

1974–1983: The County of the City of Glasgow wards of Calton, Dalmarnock, Exchange, and Townhead.

1983–1997: The City of Glasgow District electoral divisions of Central/Calton, Kingston/Hutchesontown, and Queen's Park/Crosshill.

2005–2024: Under the Fifth Review of UK Parliament constituencies which came into effect for the 2005 general election, the boundaries were defined in accordance with the ward structure in place on 30 November 2004 as containing the Glasgow City Council wards of Anderston, Bridgeton/Dalmarnock, Calton, Govanhill, Hutchesontown, Kelvingrove, Kingston, Merchant City, Pollokshields East, Strathbungo, and Toryglen.

From 2005, Glasgow Central was one of seven constituencies covering the Glasgow City council area, all entirely within the council area. Prior to the 2005 general election, the city area was covered by ten constituencies, of which two straddled boundaries with other council areas.

The Central constituency, as defined in 2005, included parts of the former Glasgow Govan, Glasgow Kelvin, Glasgow Shettleston, Glasgow Pollok and Glasgow Rutherglen constituencies. Scottish Parliament constituencies for the area are predominantly Glasgow Southside on the South of the river and Glasgow Kelvin on the North of the river, with Calton, Bridgeton and Dalmarnock areas of Glasgow Shettleston as well as a single polling place each from Glasgow Cathcart and Glasgow Provan.

The Central constituency sat across the River Clyde, and included the areas of Kelvingrove, Anderston, Merchant City, Calton, Bridgeton, Kingston, Gorbals, Govanhill and part of Pollokshields .

Further to reviews of local government ward boundaries which came into effect in 2007 and 2017, but did not affect the parliamentary boundaries, the constituency comprised the City of Glasgow Council wards or part wards of: Govan (minority), Pollokshields (minority), Langside (small part), Southside Central (nearly all), Calton (majority), Anderston/City/Yorkhill (all), and Hillhead (very small part).

On abolition for the 2024 general election, the contents of the seat were distributed as follows:

- Glasgow East (44.6% of population) – districts of Merchant City, Calton, Bridgeton and Dalmarnock to the north of the River Clyde and Gorbals, Govanhill and Hutchesontown on the south side.
- Glasgow North (24.5%) – City centre, Anderston and Kelvingrove.
- Glasgow South West (17.8%) – Kingston, Tradeston, Kinning Park, Dumbreck and parts in Pollokshields.
- Glasgow South (9.3%) – Toryglen and small area to the north of Queen's Park.
- Glasgow North East (3.8%) - small area around Townhead.

== Constituency profile ==
This former constituency took in Glasgow city centre to the north, including Kelvingrove Art Gallery, the main railway stations, Glasgow Cathedral and the Scottish Exhibition and Conference Centre. It was home to both Strathclyde and Caledonian Universities, as well as the Royal Conservatoire of Scotland (formerly the Royal Scottish Academy of Music and Drama and still often referred to locally as RSAMD) and the Glasgow School of Art. It was home to a significant number of students attending the University of Glasgow, which is just over the boundary in Glasgow North. The large student population was an important factor in elections, and the presence of four degree-awarding institutions as well as a significant portion of the student body of a fifth has led to claims that it was the best-educated constituency in the United Kingdom. The Merchant City was also here, yuppie housing built out of the disused cotton and tobacco warehouses. This area is a symbol of the rebirth of the city.

At the heart of this former constituency is the River Clyde, marking the boundaries of Glasgow Central from the Commonwealth Arena and Sir Chris Hoy Velodrome and Oatlands in the east of the constituency, to Glasgow Science Centre and Glasgow's Riverside Museum to the west. There are some deprived areas within the former seat itself it is mostly an affluent area.

Glasgow Central was estimated to have voted to Remain in the European Union by 66.6% in the 2016 referendum on the UK's membership of the EU.

== Members of Parliament ==
Election	Member	Party
1885	Gilbert Beith	Liberal
1886	John George Alexander Baird	Conservative
1906	Andrew Mitchell Torrance	Liberal
1909 by-election	Charles Dickson	Conservative
1915 by-election	John McLeod	Conservative
1918	Andrew Bonar Law	Unionist
1923	William Alexander	Unionist
1945	James Hutchison	Unionist
1950	James McInnes	Labour
1966	Thomas McLellan McMillan	Labour
1980 by-election	Bob McTaggart	Labour
1989 by-election	Mike Watson	Labour
1997	constituency abolished	
2005	Mohammad Sarwar	Labour
2010	Anas Sarwar	Labour
2015	Alison Thewliss	SNP

== Election results ==
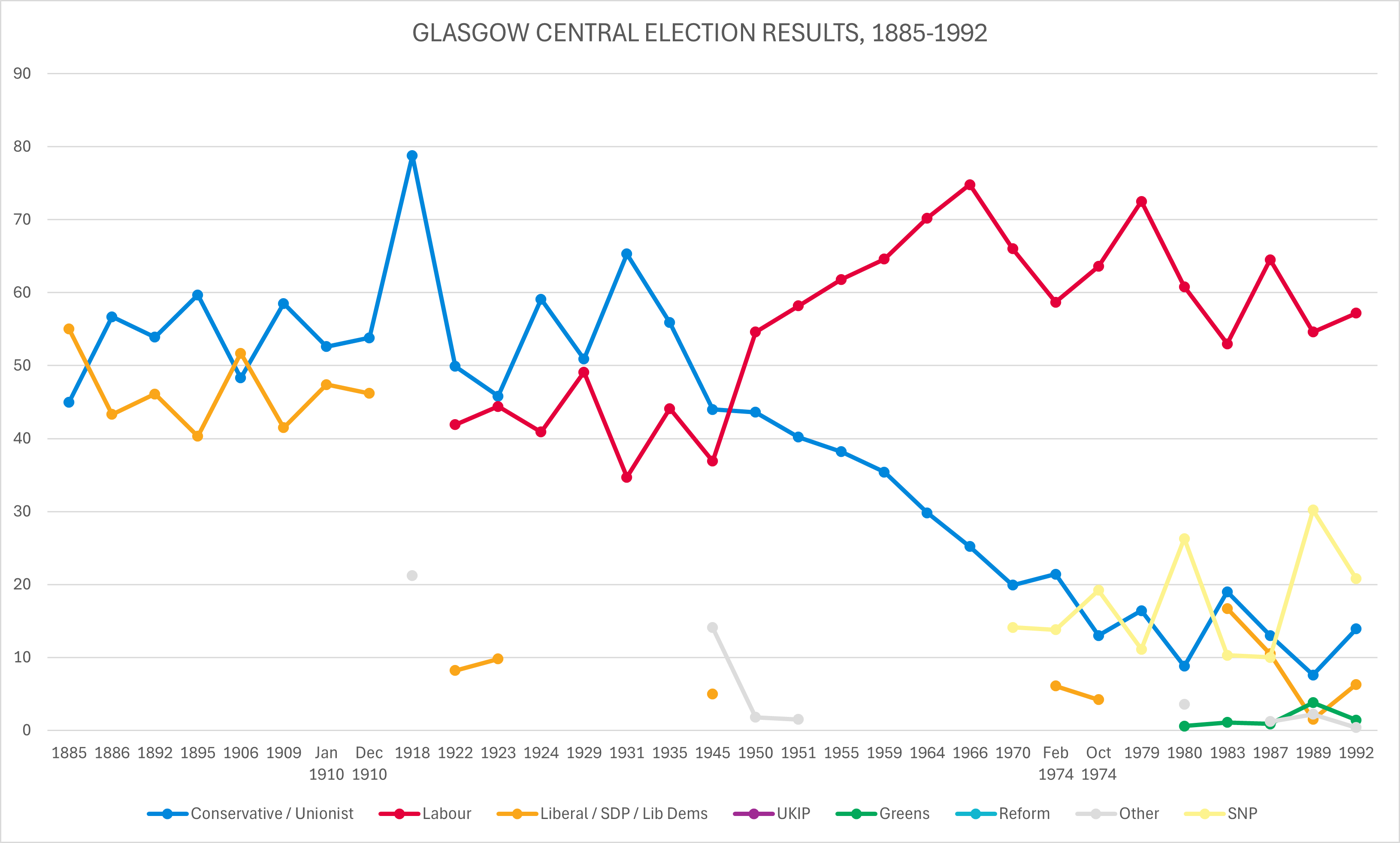
Election results 1885-1992

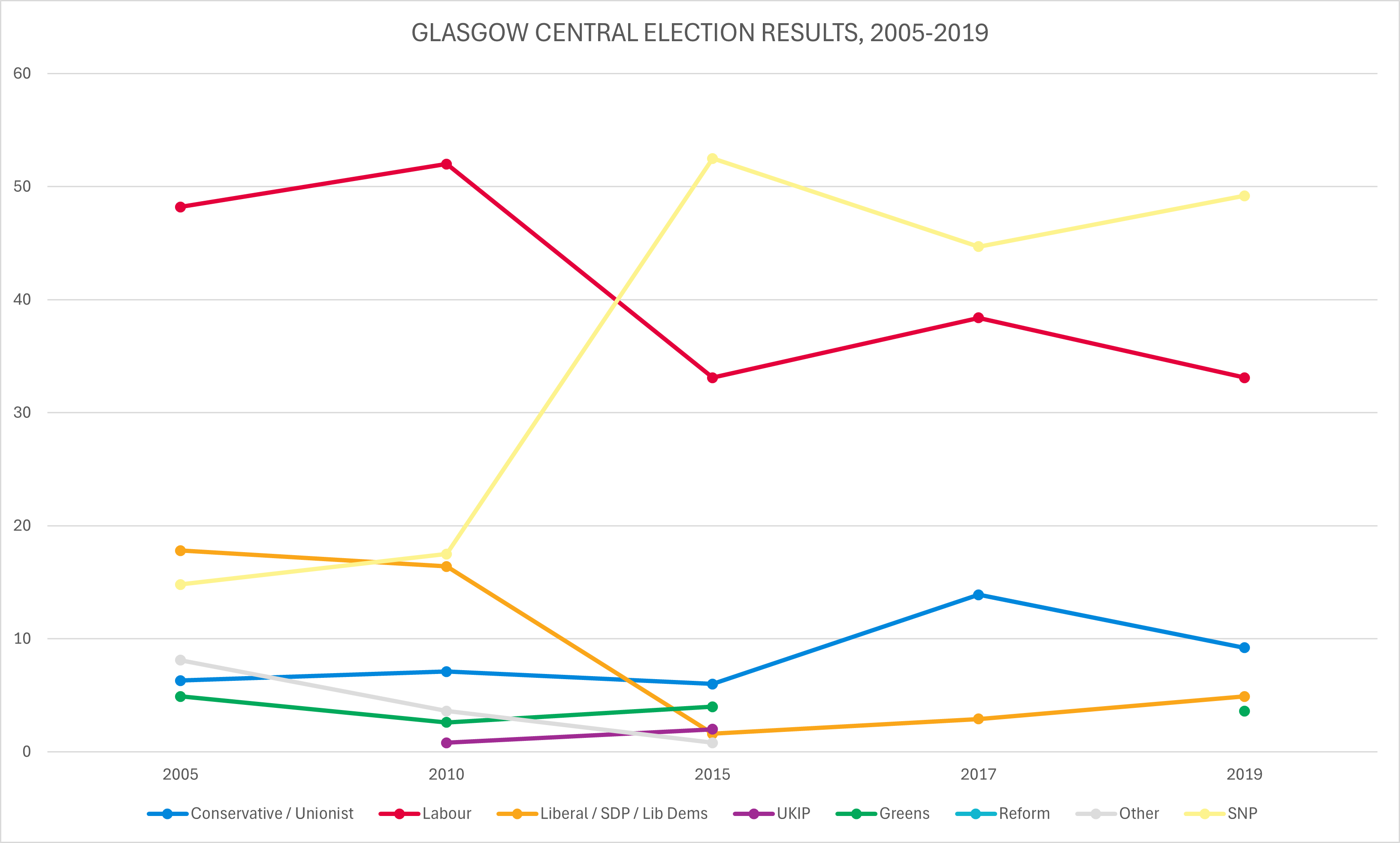
Election results 2005-2019

=== Elections in the 2010s ===
General election 2019: Glasgow Central
Party	Candidate	Votes	%	±%
SNP	Alison Thewliss	19,750	49.2	+4.5
Labour	Faten Hameed	13,276	33.1	−5.3
Conservative	Flora Scarabello	3,698	9.2	−4.7
Liberal Democrats	Ewan Hoyle	1,952	4.9	+2.0
Green	Elaine Gallagher	1,429	3.6	New
Majority		6,474	16.1	+9.8
Turnout		40,105	57.9	+2.0
SNP hold		Swing	+4.9	

Flora Scarabello was suspended by the Scottish Conservatives after alleged Islamophobia. Because nominations had closed at the time of her suspension, she still appeared on the ballot paper as the Conservative candidate.

General election 2017: Glasgow Central
Party	Candidate	Votes	%	±%
SNP	Alison Thewliss	16,096	44.7	−7.8
Labour	Faten Hameed	13,829	38.4	+5.3
Conservative	Charlotte Fairbanks	5,014	13.9	+7.9
Liberal Democrats	Isabel Nelson	1,045	2.9	+1.3
Majority		2,267	6.3	−13.1
Turnout		35,984	55.9	+0.5
SNP hold		Swing	-6.6	

General election 2015: Glasgow Central
Party	Candidate	Votes	%	±%
SNP	Alison Thewliss	20,658	52.5	+35.0
Labour	Anas Sarwar	12,996	33.1	−18.9
Conservative	Simon Bone	2,359	6.0	−1.1
Green	Cass Macgregor	1,559	4.0	+1.4
UKIP	Stuart Maskell	786	2.0	+1.2
Liberal Democrats	Chris Young	612	1.6	−14.8
CISTA	James Marris	171	0.4	New
TUSC	Andrew Elliott	119	0.3	New
Socialist Equality	Katie Rhodes	58	0.1	New
Majority		7,662	19.4	N/A
Turnout		39,318	55.4	+4.5
SNP gain from Labour		Swing	+27.0	

General election 2010: Glasgow Central
Party	Candidate	Votes	%	±%
Labour	Anas Sarwar	15,908	52.0	+3.8
SNP	Osama Saeed	5,357	17.5	+2.7
Liberal Democrats	Chris Young	5,010	16.4	−1.4
Conservative	John Bradley	2,158	7.1	+0.8
Green	Alastair Whitelaw	800	2.6	−2.3
BNP	Ian Holt	616	2.0	−0.4
Scottish Socialist	James Nesbitt	357	1.2	−2.8
UKIP	Ramsay Urquhart	246	0.8	New
Pirate	Finlay Archibald	128	0.4	New
Majority		10,551	34.5	+4.1
Turnout		30,580	50.9	+7.1
Labour hold		Swing		

=== Elections in the 2000s ===
General election 2005: Glasgow Central
Party	Candidate	Votes	%	±%
Labour	Mohammad Sarwar	13,518	48.2	−6.5
Liberal Democrats	Isabel Nelson	4,987	17.8	+8.2
SNP	Bill Kidd	4,148	14.8	−6.1
Conservative	Richard Sullivan	1,757	6.3	+0.1
Green	Gordon Masterton	1,372	4.9	New
Scottish Socialist	Marie Gordon	1,110	4.0	−2.5
BNP	Walter Hamilton	671	2.4	New
Socialist Labour	Ian Johnson	255	0.9	+0.5
Christian Vote	Thomas Greig	139	0.5	New
Communist	Elinor McKenzie	80	0.3	+0.1
Majority		8,531	30.4	−3.4
Turnout		28,037	43.8	+4.4
Labour hold		Swing	−7.3	

=== Elections in the 1990s ===
General election 1992: Glasgow Central
Party	Candidate	Votes	%	±%
Labour	Mike Watson	17,341	57.2	−7.3
SNP	Brendan O'Hara	6,322	20.8	+10.8
Conservative	Ewen N. Stewart	4,208	13.9	+0.9
Liberal Democrats	Alan Rennie	1,921	6.3	−4.2
Green	Irene F. Brandt	435	1.4	+0.5
Communist (PCC)	Tam Dean Burn	106	0.4	−0.4
Majority		11,019	36.4	−15.1
Turnout		30,333	63.1	−2.5
Labour hold		Swing	−9.1	

=== Elections in the 1980s ===
By-election 1989: Glasgow Central
Party	Candidate	Votes	%	±%
Labour	Mike Watson	14,480	54.6	−9.9
SNP	Alex Neil	8,018	30.2	+20.2
Conservative	Allan Hogarth	2,028	7.6	−5.4
Green	Irene F. Brandt	1,019	3.8	+2.9
SLD	Robert McCreadie	411	1.5	−9.0
SDP	Peter Kerr	253	1.0	New
Revolutionary Communist	Linda Murdoch	141	0.5	New
Scottish Socialist	Bill Kidd	137	0.5	New
Workers Revolutionary	David Lettice	48	0.2	New
Majority		6,462	24.4	−27.1
Turnout		26,535	52.9	−12.7
Labour hold		Swing	-15.1	

General election 1987: Glasgow Central
Party	Candidate	Votes	%	±%
Labour	Bob McTaggart	21,619	64.5	+11.5
Conservative	Bernard Jenkin	4,366	13.0	−6.0
Liberal	John Bryden	3,528	10.5	−6.2
SNP	Alexander Wilson	3,339	10.0	−0.3
Green	Andrew Brooks	290	0.9	New
Communist	John McGoldrick	265	0.8	−0.3
Red Front	Derek Owen	126	0.4	New
Majority		17,253	51.5	+17.5
Turnout		33,533	65.6	+2.8
Labour hold		Swing		

General election 1983: Glasgow Central
Party	Candidate	Votes	%	±%
Labour	Bob McTaggart	17,066	53.0	−21.5
Conservative	William Harvey	6,104	19.0	+2.6
Liberal	Isabel Nelson	5,366	16.7	N/A
SNP	Peter Mallan	3,300	10.3	−0.8
Communist	John McGoldrick	347	1.1	New
Majority		10,962	34.0	−21.9
Turnout		32,183	62.8	+3.3
Labour hold		Swing		

1980 Glasgow Central by-election
Party	Candidate	Votes	%	±%
Labour	Bob McTaggart	4,902	60.8	−11.7
SNP	Gil Paterson	2,122	26.3	+15.2
Conservative	Anna McCurley	707	8.8	−7.6
National Front	John MacKenzie	148	1.8	New
Scottish Young Liberal	Graham Watson	134	1.7	New
Ecology	David Mellor	45	0.6	New
Social Democrat (1979)	Donald Kean	10	0.1	New
Majority		2,780	34.5	−21.6
Turnout		8,062		
Labour hold		Swing		

=== Elections in the 1970s ===
General election 1979: Glasgow Central
Party	Candidate	Votes	%	±%
Labour	Thomas McLellan McMillan	8,542	72.5	+8.9
Conservative	Farooq Ahmed Saleem	1,937	16.4	+3.4
SNP	Stephen Graham Bird	1,308	11.1	−8.1
Majority		6,605	56.1	+11.7
Turnout		11,787	59.5	−1.4
Labour hold		Swing	+2.7	

General election October 1974: Glasgow Central
Party	Candidate	Votes	%	±%
Labour	Thomas McLellan McMillan	9,231	63.6	+4.9
SNP	Brian Nugent	2,790	19.2	+5.4
Conservative	Norman Woolfson	1,880	13.0	−7.4
Liberal	Eric Matthew Bennett	605	4.2	−1.9
Majority		6,441	44.4	+7.2
Turnout		14,506	56.9	−6.1
Labour hold		Swing	–0.2	

General election February 1974: Glasgow Central
Party	Candidate	Votes	%	±%
Labour	Thomas McLellan McMillan	9,400	58.7	−7.3
Conservative	M. Gourlay	3,435	21.4	+1.5
SNP	Stewart Martin Ewing	2,211	13.8	−0.3
Liberal	Alexander Paton Brodie	982	6.1	New
Majority		5,965	37.2	−8.9
Turnout		16,028	63.0	+3.8
Labour hold		Swing	–4.4	

General election 1970: Glasgow Central
Party	Candidate	Votes	%	±%
Labour	Thomas McLellan McMillan	7,936	66.0	−8.8
Conservative	Gordon Rennie	2,394	19.9	−5.3
SNP	Angus Mclntosh	1,688	14.1	New
Majority		5,542	46.1	−3.5
Turnout		12,018	59.2	+0.5
Labour hold		Swing	–1.7	

=== Elections in the 1960s ===
General election 1966: Glasgow Central
Party	Candidate	Votes	%	±%
Labour	Thomas McLellan McMillan	11,673	74.8	+4.6
Conservative	Ronald B Anderson	3,924	25.2	−4.7
Majority		7,749	49.6	+9.3
Turnout		15,597	58.7	−3.7
Labour hold		Swing	+4.7	

General election 1964: Glasgow Central
Party	Candidate	Votes	%	±%
Labour	James McInnes	13,343	70.2	+5.6
Unionist	George F Boyd	5,679	29.9	−5.5
Majority		7,664	40.3	+11.1
Turnout		19,022	62.4	−5.0
Labour hold		Swing	+5.5	

=== Elections in the 1950s ===
General election 1959: Glasgow Central
Party	Candidate	Votes	%	±%
Labour	James McInnes	15,918	64.6	+2.8
Unionist	Iain David Barber-Fleming	8,712	35.4	−2.8
Majority		7,206	29.2	+5.6
Turnout		24,630	67.4	+4.7
Labour hold		Swing		

General election 1955: Glasgow Central
Party	Candidate	Votes	%	±%
Labour	James McInnes	16,674	61.8	+3.6
Unionist	Iain David Barber-Fleming	10,307	38.2	−2.0
Majority		6,367	23.6	+5.6
Turnout		26,981	62.7	−11.6
Labour hold		Swing		

General election 1951: Glasgow Central
Party	Candidate	Votes	%	±%
Labour	James McInnes	15,757	58.2	+3.6
Unionist	William Sinclair	10,875	40.2	−3.4
United Socialist Movement	Guy Aldred	411	1.5	−0.3
Majority		4,882	18.0	+7.0
Turnout		27,043	74.3	+0.7
Labour hold		Swing		

General election 1950: Glasgow Central
Party	Candidate	Votes	%	±%
Labour	James McInnes	14,861	54.6	+14.7
Unionist	James Hutchison	11,857	43.6	−0.4
United Socialist Movement	Guy Aldred	485	1.8	+0.4
Majority		3,004	11.0	N/A
Turnout		27,203	73.6	+13.9
Labour gain from Unionist		Swing		

=== Elections in the 1940s ===
General election 1945: Glasgow Central
Party	Candidate	Votes	%	±%
Unionist	James Hutchison	9,365	44.0	−11.9
Labour	James McInnes	7,849	36.9	−7.2
Communist	Bob Cooney	2,709	12.7	New
Liberal	Norman Macleod Glen	1,072	5.0	New
United Socialist Movement	Guy Aldred	300	1.4	New
Majority		1,516	7.1	−4.7
Turnout		21,295	59.7	
Unionist hold		Swing		

=== Elections in the 1930s ===
General election 1935: Glasgow Central
Party	Candidate	Votes	%	±%
Unionist	William Alexander	16,707	55.9	−9.4
Labour	Richard Stokes	13,186	44.1	+9.4
Majority		3,521	11.8	−18.8
Turnout		29,893		
Unionist hold		Swing		

General election 1931: Glasgow Central
Party	Candidate	Votes	%	±%
Unionist	William Alexander	21,547	65.3	+14.4
Labour	William Martin	11,456	34.7	−14.4
Majority		10,091	30.6	+28.8
Turnout		33,003		
Unionist hold		Swing		

=== Elections in the 1920s ===
General election 1929: Glasgow Central
Party	Candidate	Votes	%	±%
Unionist	William Alexander	18,336	50.9	−8.2
Labour	Craigie Aitchison	17,663	49.1	+8.2
Majority		673	1.8	−16.4
Turnout		35,999	72.0	+1.8
Registered electors		49,983		
Unionist hold		Swing	−8.2	

General election 1924: Glasgow Central
Party	Candidate	Votes	%	±%
Unionist	William Alexander	18,258	59.1	+13.3
Labour	J. D. White	12,617	40.9	−3.5
Majority		5,641	18.2	+16.8
Turnout		30,875	70.2	+2.7
Registered electors		44,010		
Unionist hold		Swing	+8.4	

Mitchell

General election 1923: Glasgow Central
Party	Candidate	Votes	%	±%
Unionist	William Alexander	13,392	45.8	−4.1
Labour	Edward Mitchell	12,976	44.4	+2.5
Liberal	Harold Tennant	2,870	9.8	+1.6
Majority		416	1.4	−6.6
Turnout		29,238	67.5	−3.7
Registered electors		43,292		
Unionist hold		Swing	−3.3	

Sir George Paish

General election 1922: Glasgow Central
Party	Candidate	Votes	%	±%
Unionist	Bonar Law	15,437	49.9	−28.9
Labour	Edward Mitchell	12,923	41.9	N/A
Liberal	George Paish	2,518	8.2	New
Majority		2,514	8.0	−49.6
Turnout		30,878	71.2	+18.3
Registered electors		43,351		
Unionist hold		Swing	−24.8	

=== Elections in the 1910s ===
General election 1918: Glasgow Central
Party		Candidate	Votes	%	±%
C	Unionist	Bonar Law	17,653	78.8	+25.0
	Independent Labour	David John Mitchel Quin	4,736	21.2	New
Majority			12,917	57.6	+50.0
Turnout			22,389	52.9	−23.5
Registered electors			42,329		
	Unionist hold		Swing		
C indicates candidate endorsed by the coalition government.

By-election 15 July 1915: Glasgow Central
Party	Candidate	Votes	%	±%
Unionist	John MacLeod	5,341	95.3	+41.5
Ind. Unionist	Gavin William Ralston	266	4.7	New
Majority		5,075	90.6	+83.0
Turnout		5,607	31.8	−54.6
Registered electors		17,610		
Unionist hold		Swing		

General election December 1910: Glasgow Central
Party	Candidate	Votes	%	±%
Conservative	Charles Dickson	6,888	53.8	+1.2
Liberal	Alexander Murison	5,907	46.2	−1.2
Majority		981	7.6	+2.4
Turnout		12,795	86.4	−0.1
Conservative hold		Swing	+1.2	

General election January 1910: Glasgow Central
Party	Candidate	Votes	%	±%
Conservative	Charles Dickson	6,713	52.6	+4.3
Liberal	Alexander Murison	6,058	47.4	−4.3
Majority		655	5.2	N/A
Turnout		12,771	86.5	+3.2
Registered electors		14,768		
Conservative gain from Liberal		Swing	+4.3	

=== Elections in the 1900s ===
1909 Glasgow Central by-election
Party	Candidate	Votes	%	±%
Conservative	Charles Dickson	7,298	58.5	+10.2
Liberal	Tommy Bowles	5,185	41.5	−10.2
Majority		2,113	17.0	N/A
Turnout		12,483	82.8	−0.5
Registered electors		15,081		
Conservative gain from Liberal		Swing	+10.2	

General election January 1906: Glasgow Central
Party	Candidate	Votes	%	±%
Liberal	Andrew Mitchell Torrance	6,720	51.7	New
Conservative	John George Alexander Baird	6,289	48.3	N/A
Majority		431	3.4	N/A
Turnout		13,009	83.3	N/A
Registered electors		15,616		
Liberal gain from Conservative		Swing	N/A	

General election 1900: Glasgow Central
Party	Candidate	Votes	%	±%
Conservative	John George Alexander Baird	Unopposed		
Conservative hold				

=== Elections in the 1890s ===
General election 1895: Glasgow Central
Party	Candidate	Votes	%	±%
Conservative	John George Alexander Baird	5,621	59.7	+5.8
Liberal	Edwin Adam	3,792	40.3	−5.8
Majority		1,829	19.4	+11.6
Turnout		9,413	62.3	−15.9
Registered electors		15,107		
Conservative hold		Swing	+5.8	

General election 1892: Glasgow Central
Party	Candidate	Votes	%	±%
Conservative	John George Alexander Baird	6,121	53.9	−2.8
Liberal	Walter Menzies	5,245	46.1	+2.8
Majority		876	7.8	−5.6
Turnout		11,366	78.2	+1.0
Registered electors		14,542		
Conservative hold		Swing	−2.8	

=== Elections in the 1880s ===
General election 1886: Glasgow Central
Party	Candidate	Votes	%	±%
Conservative	John George Alexander Baird	5,780	56.7	+11.7
Liberal	Gilbert Beith	4,423	43.3	−11.7
Majority		1,357	13.4	N/A
Turnout		10,203	77.2	−3.2
Registered electors		13,208		
Conservative gain from Liberal		Swing	+11.7	

General election 1885: Glasgow Central
Party	Candidate	Votes	%	±%
Liberal	Gilbert Beith	5,846	55.0	
Conservative	John George Alexander Baird	4,779	45.0	
Majority		1,067	10.0	
Turnout		10,625	80.4	
Registered electors		13,208		
Liberal win (new seat)				

== See also ==
- Politics of Glasgow

Parliament of the United Kingdom
Preceded by Caernarvon Boroughs	Constituency represented by the prime minister 1922–1923	Succeeded by Bewdley
