= Euxippe =

Euxippe (Εὐξίππη) is an Ancient Greek given name that may refer to:

- Euxippe (mythology), founder of Acraephnium, married to Acraepheus
- Euxippe, one of the Leuctrides
