= History of seafood =

The harvesting and consuming of seafoods are ancient practices that may date back to at least the Upper Paleolithic period which dates to between 50,000 and 10,000 years ago. Isotopic analysis of the skeletal remains of Tianyuan man, a 40,000-year-old modern human from eastern Asia, has shown that he regularly consumed freshwater fish. Archaeology features such as shell middens, discarded fish bones and cave paintings show that sea foods were important for survival and consumed in significant quantities. During this period, most people lived a hunter-gatherer lifestyle and were, of necessity, frequently on the move. However, where there are early examples of permanent settlements (though not necessarily permanently occupied) such as those at Lepenski Vir, they are almost always associated with fishing as a major source of food.

== Ancient Egypt ==
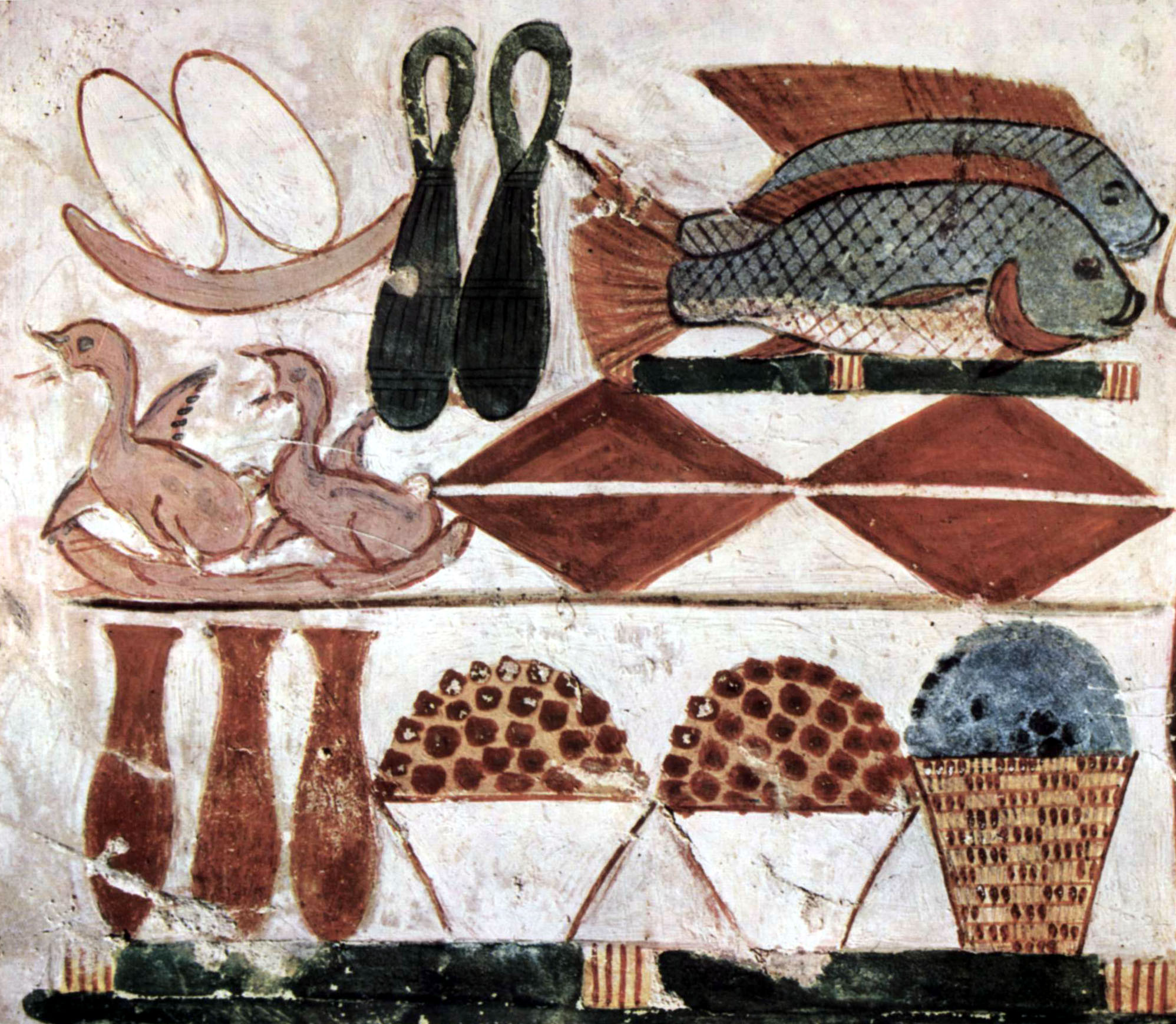
Various foods depicted in an Egyptian burial chamber, including fish, c. 1400 BC

The Nile River was full of fish; fresh and dried fish were a staple food for much of the population. The Egyptians had implements and methods for fishing and these are illustrated in tomb scenes, drawings, and papyrus documents. Some representations hint at fishing being pursued as a pastime.

== Ancient Israelites ==
The Israelites ate a variety of fresh and saltwater fish, according to both archaeological and textual evidence. Remains of freshwater fish from the Yarkon and Jordan rivers and the Sea of Galilee have been found in excavations, and include St. Peter's fish and mouthbreeders. Saltwater fish discovered in excavations include sea bream, grouper, meager and gray mullet. Most of these come from the Mediterranean, but in the later Iron Age period, some are from the Red Sea. Fishermen supplied fish to inland communities, as remains of fish, including bones and scales, have been discovered at many inland sites. To preserve them for transport, the fish were first smoked or dried and salted. Merchants also imported fish, sometimes from as far as from Egypt, where pickled roe was an export article. Remains of Nile Perch from Egypt have been found, and these must have been smoked or dried, before being imported through the trade network that connected ancient Near Eastern societies. Merchants shipped fish to Jerusalem and there was evidently a significant trade in fish; one of the gates of Jerusalem was called the Fish Gate, named for a fish market nearby. Fish products were salted and dried and sent great distances during the Israelite and Judean monarchies. However, even in the later Persian, Greek and Roman periods, the cost of preserving and transporting fish must have meant that only wealthier inhabitants of the highland towns and cities could afford it, or those who lived close to the sources, where it was less expensive.

== Ancient Greece ==
Fishing scenes are rarely represented in ancient Greek culture, a reflection of the low social status of fishing. The consumption of fish varied in accordance with the wealth and location of the household. In the Greek islands and on the coast, fresh fish and seafood (squid, octopus, and shellfish) were common. They were eaten locally but more often transported inland. Sardines and anchovies were regular fare for the citizens of Athens. They were sometimes sold fresh, but more frequently salted. A stele of the late 3rd century BCE from the small Boeotian city of Akraiphia, on Lake Copais, provides us with a list of fish prices. The cheapest was skaren (probably parrotfish) whereas Atlantic bluefin tuna was three times as expensive. Common salt water fish were yellowfin tuna, red mullet, ray, swordfish or sturgeon, a delicacy which was eaten salted. Lake Copais itself was famous in all Greece for its eels, celebrated by the hero of The Acharnians. Other fresh water fish were pike-fish, carp and the less appreciated catfish.

== Ancient Rome ==
A sauce fines herbes for fried fish

Use any kind of fish. Prepare clean, salt, turn in flour, salt and fry it. Crush pepper, cumin, coriander seed, laser root, origany, and rue, all crushed fine, moistened with vinegar, date wine, honey, reduced must, oil, and broth. Pour in a sauce pan, place on fire, when simmering pour over the fried fish, sprinkle with pepper and serve.

– Book 10 of the Apicius, a collection of Roman cookery recipes probably compiled about 500 AD. Altogether the book contains 36 recipes for fish sauces.

Pictorial evidence of Roman fishing comes from mosaics. The Greco-Roman sea god Neptune is depicted as wielding a fishing trident. Fish was served only in earlier periods, and it remained more expensive than simpler meat types. Breeding was attempted in freshwater and saltwater ponds, but some kinds of fish could not be fattened in captivity. Among those that could was the formidable and potentially toxic Mediterranean moray, a valued delicacy which were reared in ponds at the seaside. These morays were also kept as pets and sometimes as a means of punishment. Another farmed species was the popular, mullus, the goatfish. At a certain time this fish was considered the epitome of luxury, above all because its scales exhibit a bright red color when it dies out of water. For this reason these fish were occasionally allowed to die slowly at the table. There even was a recipe where this would take place in garo, in the sauce. At the beginning of the Imperial era, however, this custom suddenly came to an end, which is why mullus in the feast of Trimalchio (see the Satyricon) could be shown as a characteristic of the parvenu, who bores his guests with an unfashionable display of dying fish. The fish and fishing practices of the Roman era were recorded by the Greco-Roman Oppian of Cilicia, whose Halieutics was an expansive poem in hexameter composed between 177 and 180. It is the earliest such work to have survived to the modern day.

Garum, also known as liquamen, was the universal sauce added to everything. It was prepared by subjecting salted fish, in particular mackerel intestines, to a very slow thermal process. Over the course of two to three months, in an enzymatic process stimulated by heating, usually by exposure to the sun, the protein-laden fish parts decomposed almost entirely. The resulting mass was then filtered and the liquid traded as garum, the remaining solids as alec - a kind of savoury spread. Because of the smell it produced, the production of garum within the city was banned. Garum, supplied in small sealed amphorae, was used throughout the Empire and totally replaced salt as a condiment. Today similar sauces are produced in Southeast Asia, usually sold abroad under the description "fish sauce", or nam pla.

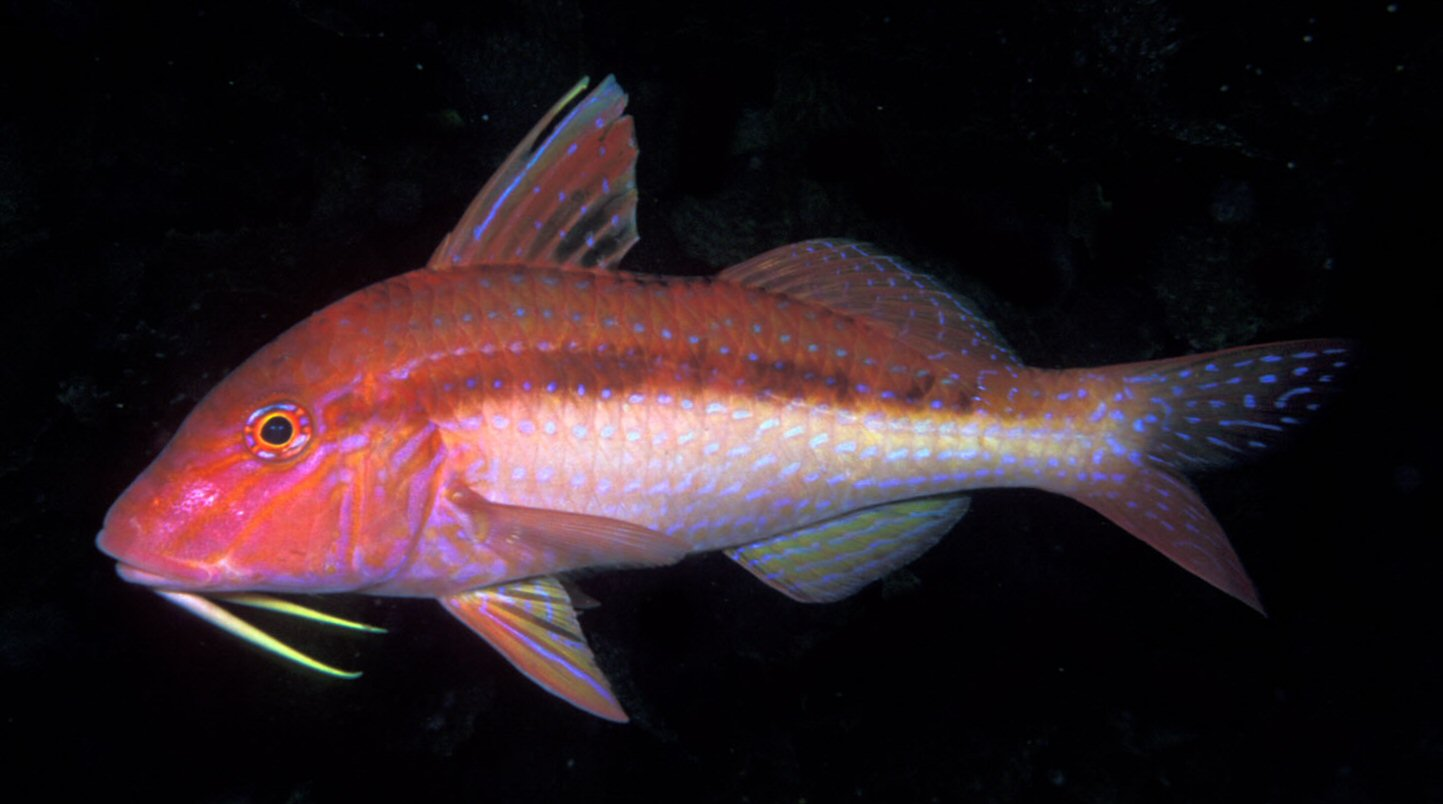
Goatfish

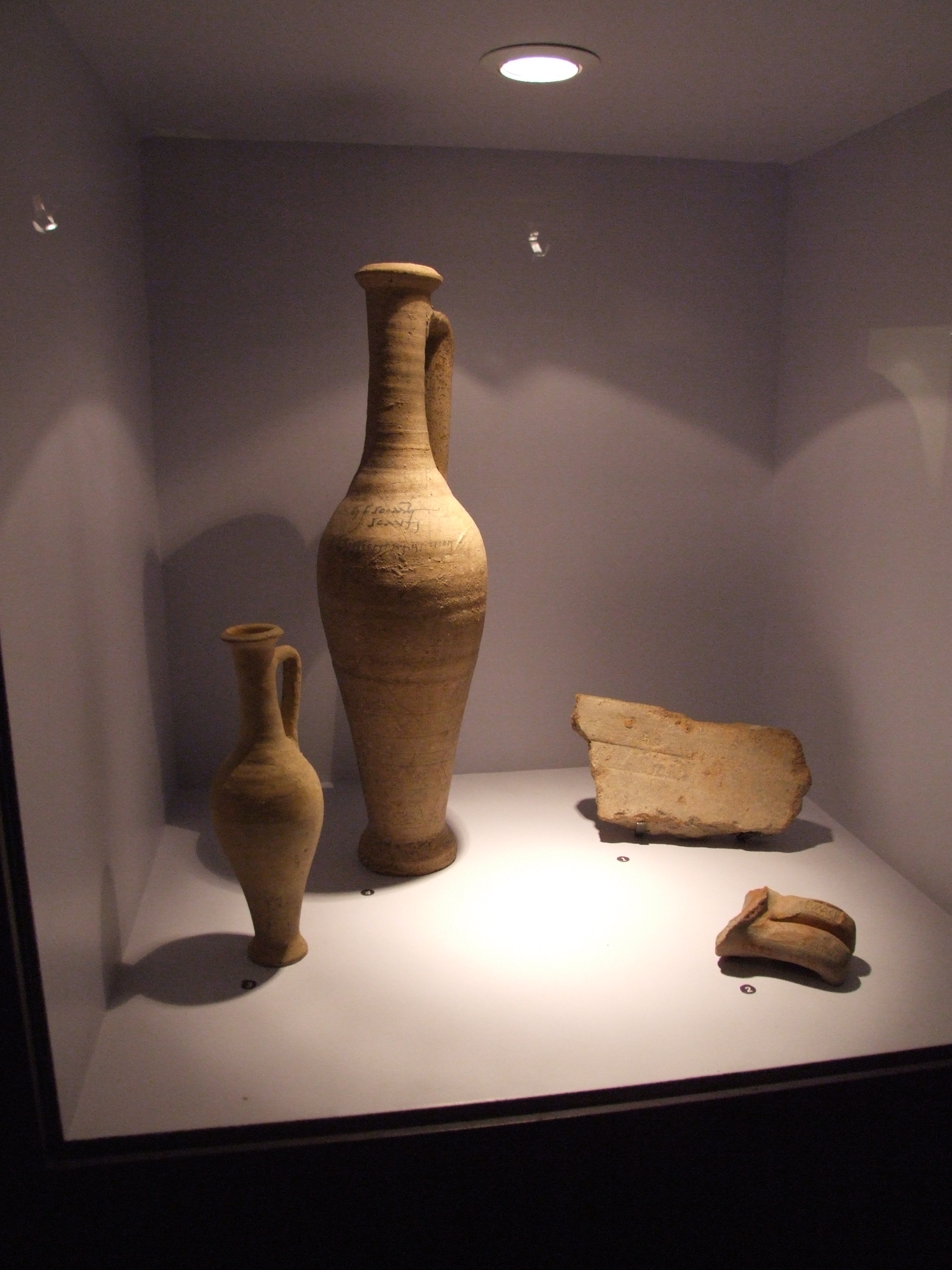
Two amphores for garum

== China ==
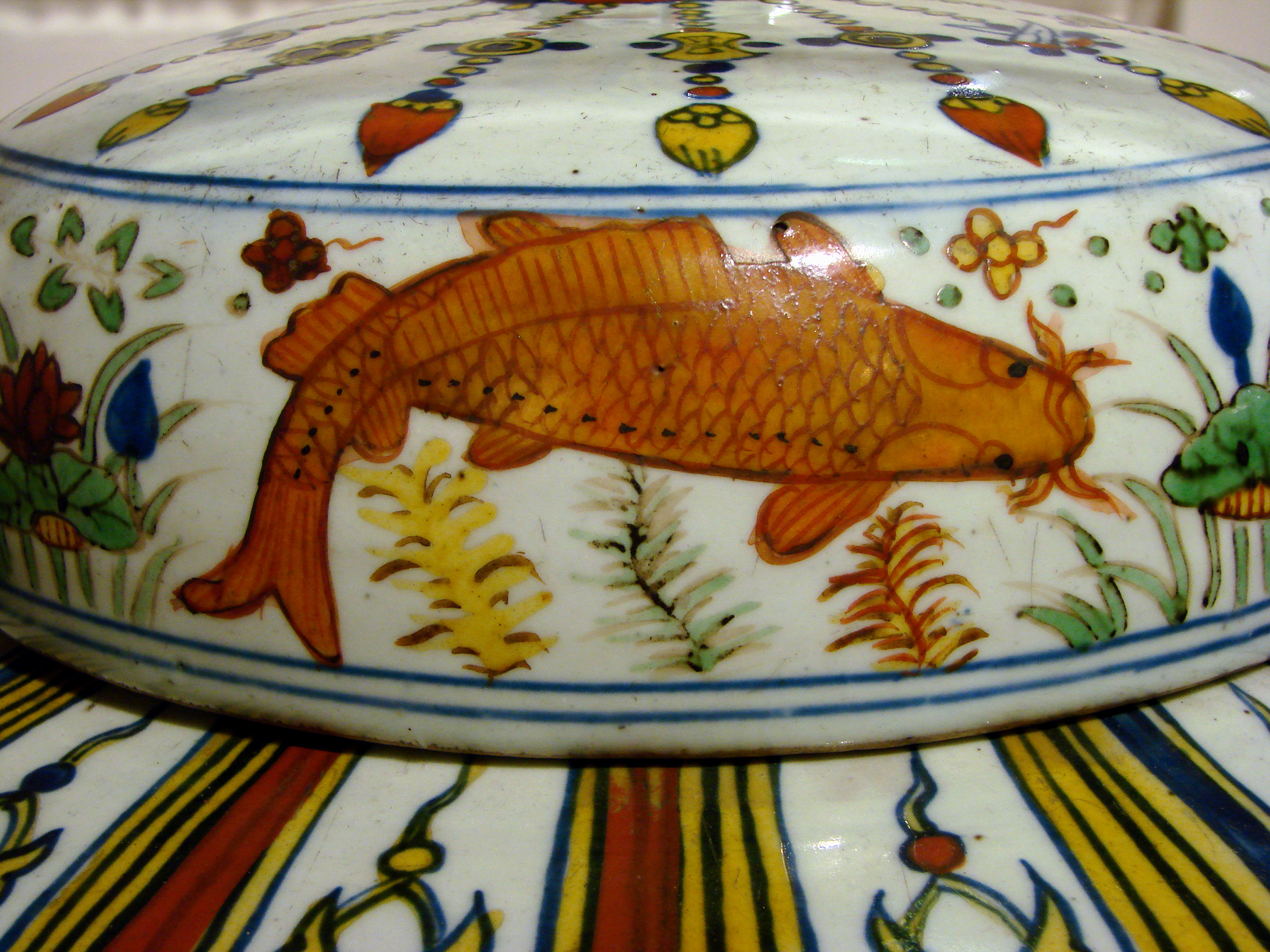
A carp on a Ming porcelain pot, AD c. 1540

"China... is widely regarded as the cradle of aquaculture."

Aquaculture in China began before the 1st millennium BC with the farming of the common carp. These carp were grown in ponds on silk farms, and were fed silkworm nymphs and faeces. Carp are native to China. They are good to eat, and they are easy to farm since they are prolific breeders, do not eat their young, and grow fast. The original idea that carp could be cultured most likely arose when they were washed into ponds and paddy fields during monsoons. This would lead naturally to the idea of stocking ponds. The Chinese politician Fan Li was credited with authorship of The Fish-Breeding Classic, the earliest-known treatise on fish farming.

During the 7th- to 10th-century Tang dynasty, the farming of common carp was banned because the Chinese word for common carp (鯉) sounded like the emperors' family name, Li (李). Anything that sounded like the emperor's name could not be kept or killed. The ban had a productive outcome, because it resulted in the development of polyculture, growing multiple species in the same ponds. Different species feed on different foods and occupy different niches in the ponds. In this way, the Chinese were able to simultaneously breed four different species of carp, the mud carp, which are bottom feeders, silver carp and bighead carp, which are midwater feeders, and grass carp which are top feeders. Another development during the Tang dynasty was a mutation of the domesticated carp, which led to the development of goldfish.

From AD 1368, the Ming Dynasty encouraged fish farmers to supply the live fish trade, which dominates Chinese fish sales to this day. From 1500, methods of collecting carp fry from rivers and then rearing them in ponds were developed."

== Japan ==
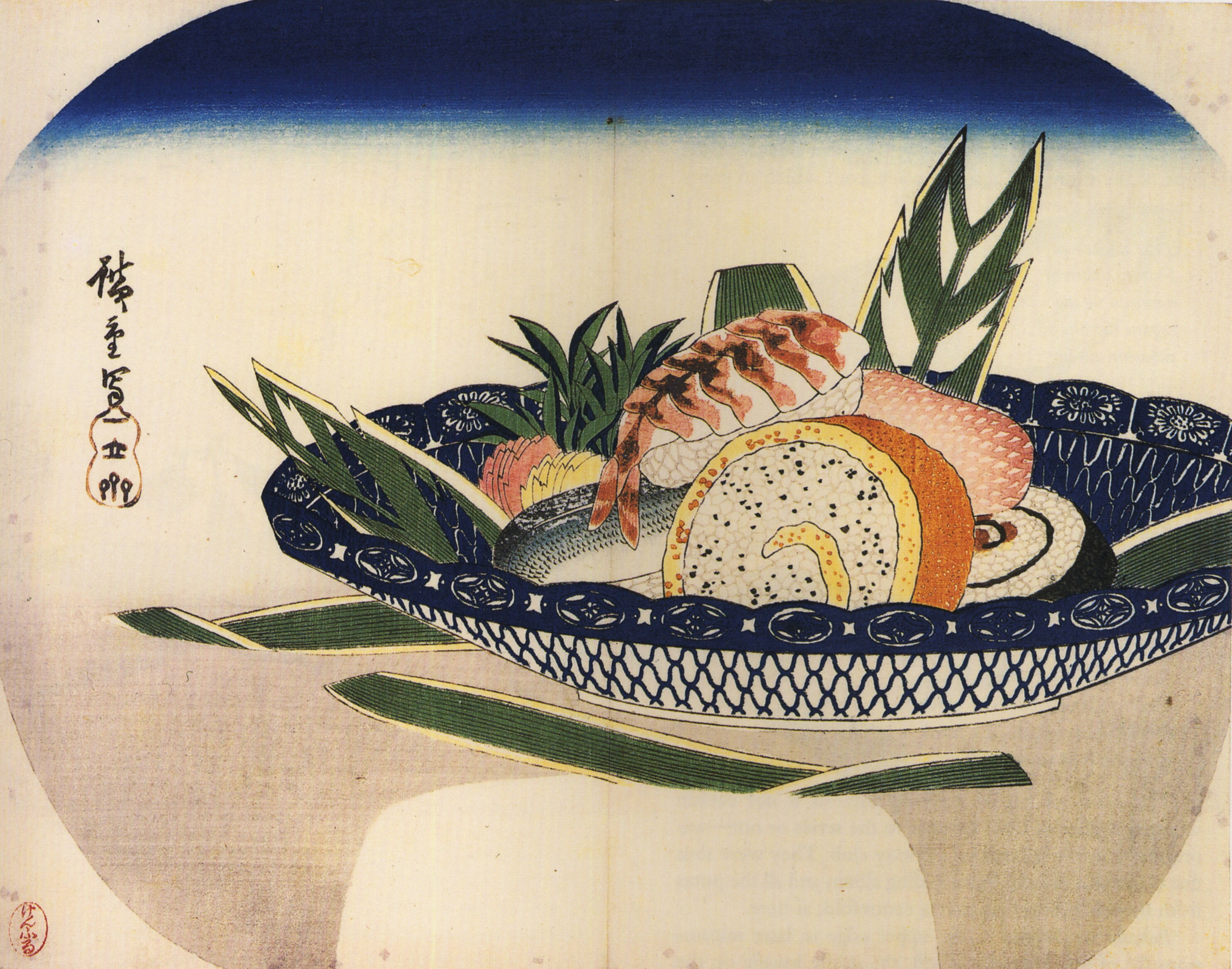
Bowl of Sushi by Hiroshige, 19th century

In Japan, sushi has traditionally been considered a delicacy. The original type of sushi, nare-zushi, was first developed in Southeast Asia and then spread to southern China before its introduction to Japan sometime around the 8th century AD. Fish was salted and wrapped in fermented rice, a traditional lacto-fermented rice dish. Nare-zushi was made of this gutted fish stored in fermented rice for months at a time for preservation. The fermentation of the rice prevented the fish from spoiling. The fermented rice was discarded and fish was the only part consumed. This early type of sushi became an important source of protein for the Japanese. During the Muromachi period, another way of preparing sushi was developed, called namanare. Namanare was partly raw fish wrapped in rice, consumed fresh, before it changed flavor. During the Edo period, a third type of sushi was developed, haya-zushi. Haya-zushi was assembled so that both rice and fish could be consumed at the same time, and the dish became unique to Japanese culture. It was the first time that rice was not being used for fermentation. Rice was now mixed with vinegar, with fish, vegetables and dried foodstuff added. This type of sushi is still very popular today. Each region utilizes local flavors to produce a variety of sushi that has been passed down for many generations.

When Tokyo was still known as Edo in the early 1800s, mobile food stalls run by street vendors became popular. During this period nigiri-zushi was introduced, consisting of an oblong mound of rice with a slice of fish draped over it. After the Great Kanto earthquake in 1923, nigiri-sushi chefs were displaced from Edo throughout Japan, popularizing the dish throughout the country.

== Indigenous peoples of the Americas ==
The Inuit prepared and buried large amounts of dried meat and fish. Pacific Northwest tribes crafted seafaring dugouts 40–50 feet (12–15 m) long for fishing.

== Medieval Europe ==
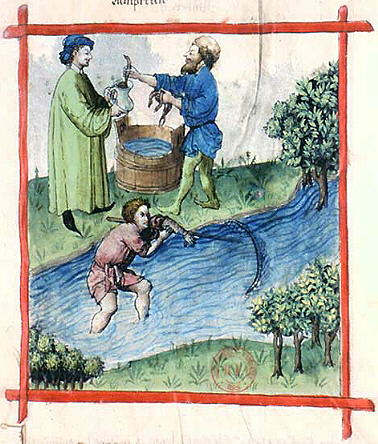
Fishing lamprey in a stream; Tacuinum Sanitatis, 15th century

In medieval Europe, seafood was less prestigious than other animal meats, and often seen as merely an alternative to meat on fast days. Still, seafood was the mainstay of many coastal populations. "Fish" to the medieval person was also a general name for anything not considered a proper land-living animal, including marine mammals such as whales and porpoises. Also included were the beaver, due to its scaly tail and considerable time spent in water, and barnacle geese, due to lack of knowledge of where they migrated. Such foods were also considered appropriate for fast days. Especially important was the fishing and trade in herring and cod in the Atlantic and the Baltic Sea. The herring was of unprecedented significance to the economy of much of Northern Europe, and it was one of the most common commodities traded by the Hanseatic League, a powerful north German alliance of trading guilds. Kippers made from herring caught in the North Sea could be found in markets as far away as Constantinople. While large quantities of fish were eaten fresh, a large proportion was salted, dried, and, to a lesser extent, smoked. Stockfish, cod that was split down the middle, fixed to a pole and dried, was very common, though preparation could be time-consuming, and meant beating the dried fish with a mallet before soaking it in water. A wide range of mollusks including oysters, mussels and scallops were eaten by coastal and river-dwelling populations, and freshwater crayfish were seen as a desirable alternative to meat during fish days. Compared to meat, fish was much more expensive for inland populations, especially in Central Europe, and therefore not an option for most. Freshwater fish such as pike, carp, bream, perch, lamprey, and trout were common.

== Religious views ==
In Islam, the Shafi'i, Maliki and Hanbali schools allow the eating of shellfish, while the Hanafi school does not allow it in Sunni Islam. Nor does the Shi'ite school (Ja'fari) allow it. The Jewish laws of Kashrut forbid the eating of shellfish and eels. According to the King James version of the bible, it is alright to eat finfish, but shellfish and eels are an abomination and should not be eaten. The Bible has many references to fishing, and fish Ichthys has become a symbol of Christianity since ancient times.Pescatarianism was widespread in the early Church, among both the clergy and laity. Ring of the Fisherman It represents Saint Peter fishing with a net in his boat, an evocation of the famous abundant catch that the apostle made at the place where Jesus told him to cast his nets, and of the exhortation that he then gave him "Be without fear, henceforth you will take men”. Since early times, the Catholic Church has forbidden the practice of eating meat, eggs and dairy products at certain times. Thomas Aquinas argued that these "afford greater pleasure as food [than fish], and greater nourishment to the human body, so that from their consumption there results a greater surplus available for seminal matter, which when abundant becomes a great incentive to lust."

== See also ==
- Food history
- History of fishing
- Marcus Gavius Apicius - Roman gourmet who lived in the 1st century AD
