= Theano (disambiguation) =

Theano may refer to:

- Theano (Θεανώ), Ancient Greek given name:
  - Theano, name of several figures in Greek mythology
  - Theano, one of the Leuctrides
  - Theano (philosopher), historical philosopher
  - Theano, lyric poet from Locris
- Theano (software), a numerical computational library
