= Akraifnio =

Akraifnio Ακραίφνιο
- Community
- Location within Greece
- Coordinates: 38°27′N 23°13′E
- Country: Greece
- Administrative region: Central Greece
- Regional unit: Boeotia
- Municipality: Orchomenos
- Municipal unit: Akraifnia
- Elevation: 250 m (820 ft)

Population (2021)
  - Community: 884
- Time zone: UTC+2 (EET)
  - Summer (DST): UTC+3 (EEST)
- Vehicle registration: ΒΙ

Akraifnio (Greek: Ακραίφνιο), before 1933 known as Karditsa (Καρδίτσα), is a village in Boeotia, Greece.

It was the seat of the former municipality Akraifnia, which is a municipal unit of the municipality Orchomenos since the 2011 local government reform.

Akraifnio is situated on the western edge of the Ptoo mountains, close to where the river Cephissus flows into Lake Yliki. It is 17 km northwest of Thebes. The A1 motorway (Athens-Thessaloniki) passes southwest of the village.

== Population ==
Year	Population
1991	1,462
2001	1,256
2011	1,058
2021	884

== History ==
Akraifnio was named after the ancient city Acraephia (Ancient Greek: Ἀκραιφία). Acraephia or Acraephnium (Ἀκραίφνιον) was an ancient Greek city (polis) on the eastern shore of Lake Copais (drained in the late 19th century) and at the foot of the Ptoo mountains. It was believed to have been founded by the mythical Acraepheus. The ruins are a short distance south from the modern village. When Alexander razed Thebes those who were too weak or old to move to Attica settled at Acraephia. Near the town there was a sanctuary to Acraephian or Ptoan Apollo with an oracle.

In the late Middle Ages, the site was occupied by the village of Karditsa. In the 13th–15th centuries, it was part of the Frankish Duchy of Athens, and in the first decades of the 14th century, it was the seat of the knight Antoine le Flamenc, reputed to be "the wisest man in the duchy", and his son, Jean. Antoine is buried in the Church of Saint George, which he built, and which carries an inscription commemorating his donation.

The municipality Akraifnio, with its seat in the village Kokkino, was established in 1835. In 1912 it was split into the communities Topolia, Loukisia, Kokkino, Karditsa and Mouriki. The village and community Karditsa was renamed Akraifnio in 1933 after the ancient city. Akraifnio became part of the larger municipality Akraifnia in 1997.

== Landmarks and points of interests ==
- Pelagia Monastery (at 560 m above sea level), oldest parts dating from the 12th century
- Sarakinos Cave, located at the edge of the Kopaida plains. Archaeological excavations have resulted in findings dating from the Palaeolithic up to the Middle Helladic Age.
