= Akraifnia =

Akraifnia Ακραιφνία
- Municipal unit
- Location within the regional unit

- Location within Greece
- Coordinates: 38°27′N 23°13′E
- Country: Greece
- Administrative region: Central Greece
- Regional unit: Boeotia
- Municipality: Orchomenos

Area
  - Municipal unit: 185.816 km^{2} (71.744 sq mi)

Population (2021)
  - Municipal unit: 2,276
  - Municipal unit density: 12.25/km^{2} (31.72/sq mi)
- Time zone: UTC+2 (EET)
  - Summer (DST): UTC+3 (EEST)
- Vehicle registration: ΒΙ

Akraifnia (Greek: Ακραιφνία) is a former municipality in Boeotia, Greece. It was established in 1997 from the former communities Akraifnio, Kastro and Kokkino. Since the 2011 local government reform it is part of the municipality Orchomenos, of which it is a municipal unit. The municipal unit has an area of 185.816 km^{2}. Population 2,276 (2021). The seat of the municipality was in Akraifnio. It was named after the ancient city Acraephia.
