= History of fishing =

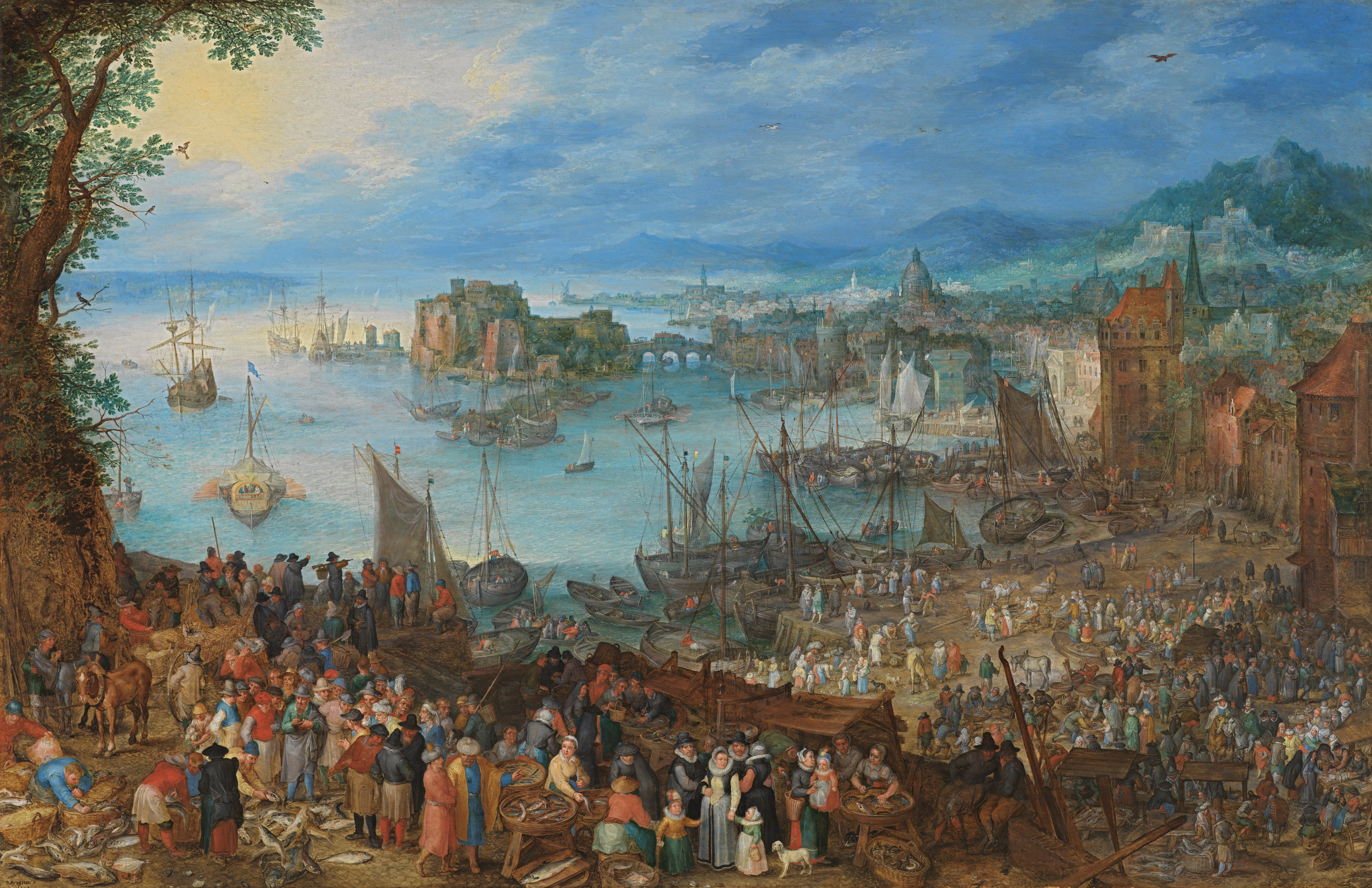
The Great Fish Market, painted by Jan Brueghel the Elder

Current evidence for the earliest fishing by modern evolved humans is from approximately 162,000 BC.

Since the 16th century, fishing vessels have been able to cross oceans in pursuit of fish, and since the 19th century it has been possible to use larger vessels and in some cases process the fish on board. Fish are normally caught in the wild. Techniques for catching fish include hand gathering, spearing, netting, angling and trapping.

The term fishing may be applied to catching other aquatic animals such as shellfish, cephalopods, crustaceans and echinoderms. The term is not usually applied to catching aquatic mammals, such as whales, where the term whaling is more appropriate, or to farmed fish. In addition to providing food, modern fishing is also recreational sport.

According to FAO statistics, the total number of fishermen and fish farmers is estimated to be 38 million. Fisheries and aquaculture provide direct and indirect employment to over 500 million people. In 2005, the worldwide per capita consumption of fish captured from wild fisheries was 14.4 kilograms, with an additional 7.4 kilograms harvested from fish farms.

== Prehistory ==
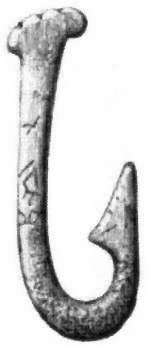
Stone Age fish hook made from bone

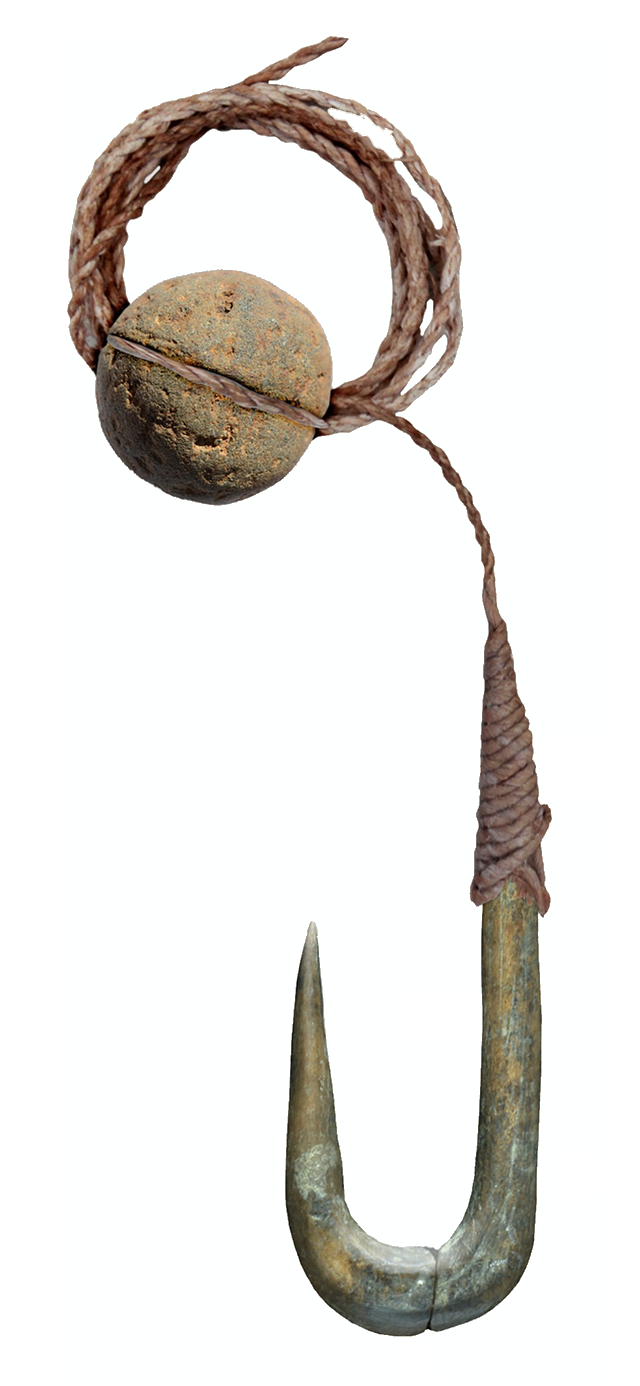
Hook and sinker from the Late Epipalaeolithic

Historically, archaic humans were not believed to have made significant use of marine food, a practice that was instead considered to have developed during the Mesolithic period. However, research beginning in the 2010s has uncovered evidence of extensive harvesting of seafood by as far as Middle Paleolithic during the Last Interglacial, where it is recorded among both early modern humans and Neanderthals. However, precise study of Paleolithic coastal settlement and use of marine food is hampered due to the fact that sea level rise after the end of the Last Glacial Maximum has submerged most prehistoric coastlines.

Evidence of mollusc eating at Pinnacle Point, a Middle Stone Age site in South Africa, has been estimated to date back to between 160,800 and 163,200 BC.

Mollusc harvesting and consumption among Paleolithic hunter-gatherers is recorded in the Iberian, Italian, and Peloponnesian Peninsulas dating as far as the Last Interglacial, where molluscs appear to have served as a supplementary element in the diets of coastal Neanderthal groups. Neanderthals in some Mediterranean sites harvested mollusks by diving, as evidenced by conditions such as abnormal bone growth in ear canals, a condition associated with habitual exposure to cold water. The Gorham's Cave complex, which was inhabited in sequence by Neanderthals and by modern humans, shows evidence of processing of various marine animals, including short-beaked common dolphin, common bottlenose dolphin, Mediterranean monk seal, Atlantic bluefin tuna, seabream, purple sea urchin, and mollusks such as mussels, limpets, and top-shells. Gruta da Figueira Brava, Portugal, also shows evidence of large-scale harvests of seafood. These consisted primarily of shellfish, including mussels, clams, limpets, brown crab, and spider crab; fishes such as European, conger, and moray eels alongside mullets, sharks, and sea breams, that could be gathered from rock pools, shallow waters, and estuaries; and various seabirds and waterfowl alongside more sporadic seal and dolphin remains. Similar sites in southern Spain and Portugal indicate that harvest of fish, shellfish, marine birds, and marine mammals was an established practice among Iberian Neanderthal populations. Later Aurignacian-era levels from Cova Foradà also show extensive consumption of mussels, limpets, and top-shells, alongside the presence of shell ornaments.

Evidence of freshwater fishing by Neanderthals has also been found in locations such as the Grotte di Castelcivita, Italy, for trout, chub, and eel; Abri du Maras, France, for chub and European perch; and Kudaro Cave, Russia, for Black Sea salmon.

Evidence of fishing also exists for the Upper Paleolithic period, beginning about 40,000 years ago. Isotopic analysis of the skeletal remains of Tianyuan man, a 40,000-year-old modern human from eastern Asia, has shown that he regularly consumed freshwater fish. Archaeological features such as shell middens, discarded fish bones, and cave paintings show that sea foods were important for survival and consumed in significant quantities. During this period, most people lived a hunter-gatherer lifestyle and were constantly on the move out of necessity. However, where there are early examples of permanent settlements (not necessarily continually occupied) like those at Lepenski Vir, they are almost always associated with fishing as a major source of food.

Spearfishing with barbed poles (harpoons) was widespread in palaeolithic times. Cosquer cave in Southern France contains cave art over 16,000 years old, including drawings of seals which appear to have been harpooned.

The Neolithic culture and technology spread worldwide between 4,000 and 8,000 years ago. With the new technologies of farming and pottery came basic forms of the main fishing methods that are still used today.

From 7500 to 3000 years ago, Native Americans of the California coast were known to engage in fishing with gorge hook and line tackle. In addition, some tribes are known to have used plant toxins to induce torpor in stream fish to enable their capture.

Copper harpoons were known to the seafaring Harappans well into antiquity. Early hunters in India include the Mincopie people, aboriginal inhabitants of India's Andaman and Nicobar islands, who have used harpoons with long cords for fishing since early times.

== Early history ==
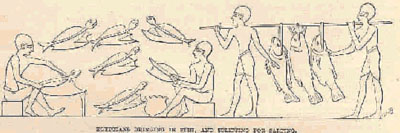
Egyptians bringing in fish, and splitting for salting.

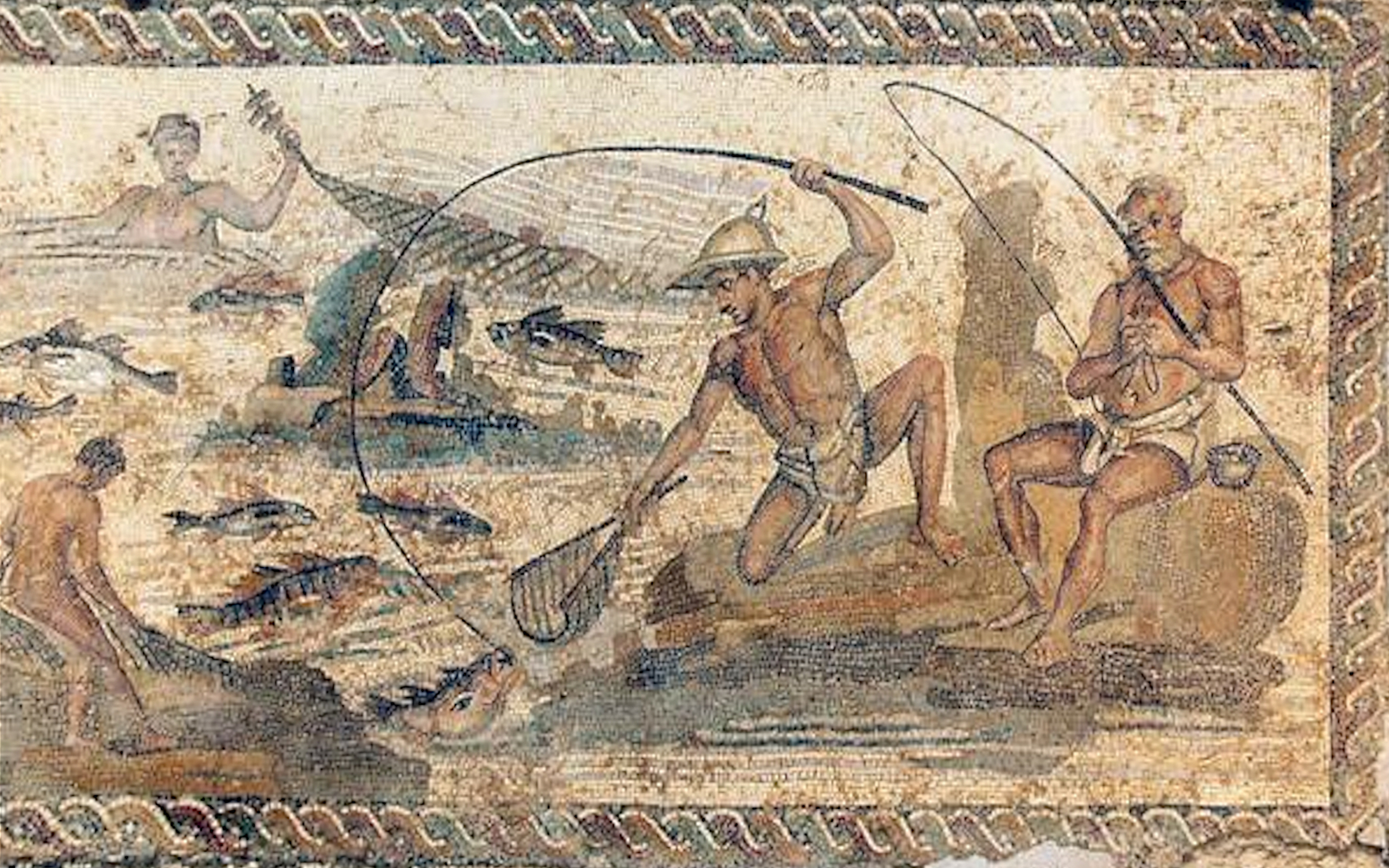
Villa of the Nile Mosaic, Lepcis Magna, Tripoli National Museum, circa 1st century CE.

In ancient history, the Nile was full of fish; fresh and dried fish were a staple food for much of the population. The Egyptians invented various implements and methods for fishing and these are clearly illustrated in tomb scenes, drawings, and papyrus documents. Simple reed boats served for fishing. Woven nets, weir baskets made from willow branches, harpoons and hook and line (the hooks having a length of between eight millimetres and eighteen centimetres) were all used. By the 12th dynasty, metal hooks with barbs were being used. As is fairly common today, the fish were clubbed to death after capture. Nile perch, catfish and eels were among the most important fish. Some representations hint at fishing being pursued as a pastime.

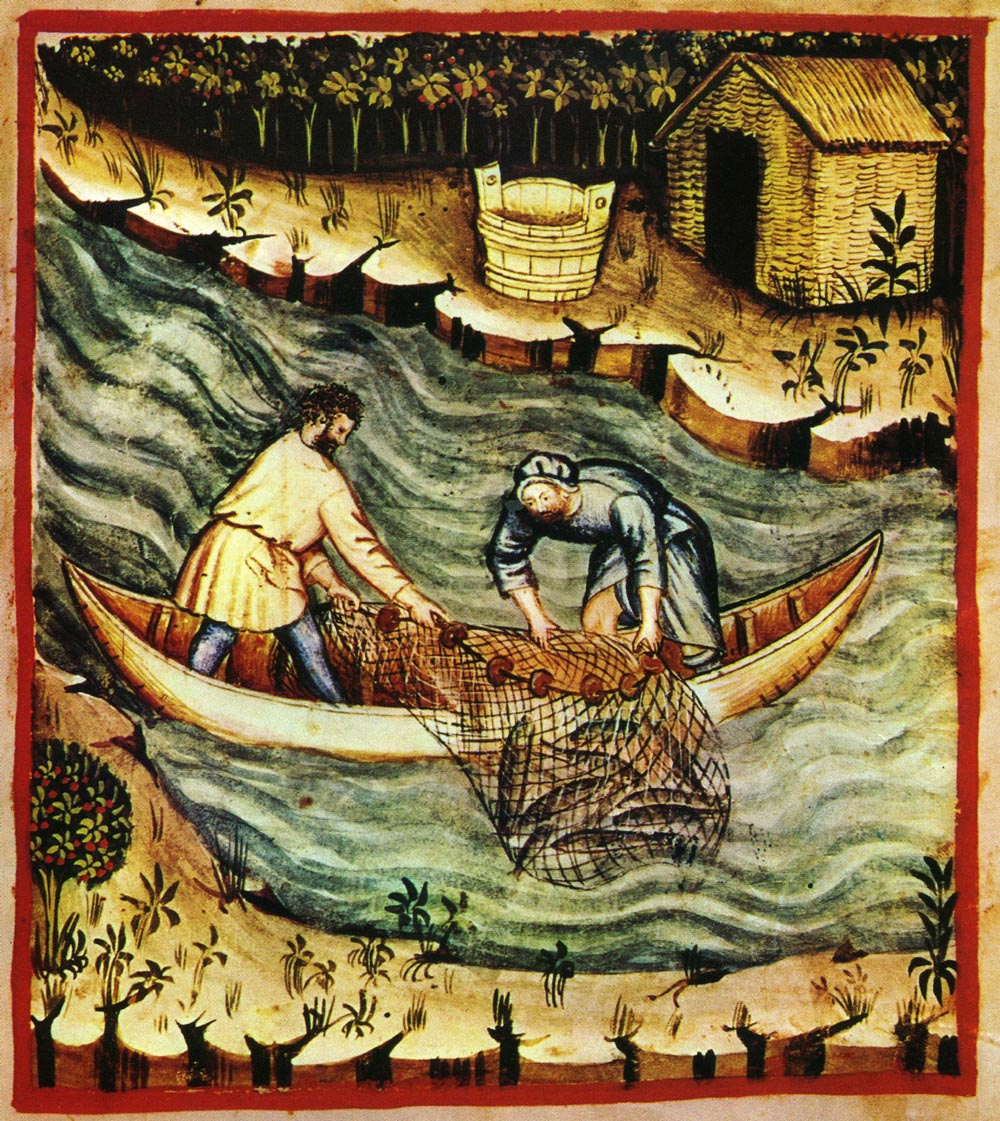
Fishing with nets, Tacuinum Sanitatis casanatensis (14th century)

There are numerous references to fishing in ancient literature; in most cases, however, the descriptions of nets and fishing-gear do not go into detail, and the equipment is described in general terms. An early example from the Bible in Job 41:7: Canst thou fill his skin with barbed irons? or his head with fish spears?

Unlike in Minoan culture, fishing scenes are rarely represented in ancient Greek culture, a reflection of the low social status of fishing. There is a wine cup, dating from c. 500 BC, that shows a boy crouched on a rock with a fishing-rod in his right hand and a basket in his left. In the water below there is a rounded object of the same material with an opening on the top. This has been identified as a fish-cage used for keeping live fish, or as a fish-trap. It is clearly not a net. This object is currently in the Museum of Fine Arts, Boston.

In Homer's Odyssey, Odysseus's companions are described catching fish with hooks. Athenaeus draws attention to this passage, arguing that Homer's account demonstrates a considerable understanding of fishing techniques.

Oppian of Corycus, a Greek author wrote a major treatise on sea fishing, the Halieulica or Halieutika, composed between 177 and 180. This is the earliest such work to have survived intact to the modern day. Oppian describes various means of fishing including the use of nets cast from boats, scoop nets held open by a hoop, spears and tridents, and various traps "which work while their masters sleep". Oppian describes a method of catching fish with a net:

The fishers set up very light nets of buoyant flax and wheel in a circle round about while they violently strike the surface of the sea with their oars and make a din with sweeping blow of poles. At the flashing of the swift oars and the noise the fish bound in terror and rush into the bosom of the net which stands at rest, thinking it to be a shelter: foolish fishes which, frightened by a noise, enter the gates of doom. Then the fishers on either side hasten with the ropes to draw the net ashore.

Several other ancient Greek authors also composed works on sea fishing, including Damostratus, Kikilios of Argos, Numenius of Heraclea, Pancrates of Arcadia, and Posidonius of Corinth. Other authors, including Seleucus of Tarsus, Leonides of Byzantium, and Agathocles of Atrax, also wrote on the subject in prose.

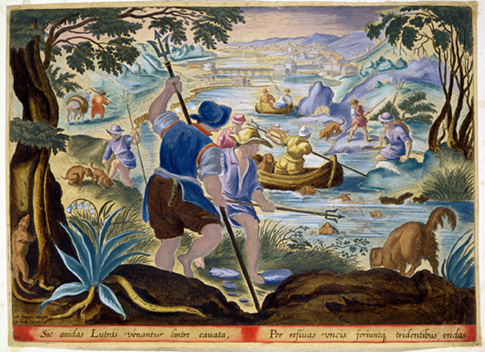
Dutch fishermen using tridents in the 17th century

The Greek historian Polybius (ca 203 BC–120 BC), in his Histories, describes hunting for swordfish by using a harpoon with a barbed and detachable head.

Pictorial evidence of Roman fishing comes from mosaics which show fishing from boats with rod and line as well as nets. Various species such as conger, lobster, sea urchin, octopus and cuttlefish are illustrated. In a parody of fishing, a type of gladiator called retiarius was armed with a trident and a casting-net. He would fight against the murmillo, who carried a short sword and a helmet with the image of a fish on the front.

The Greco-Roman sea god Neptune is depicted as wielding a fishing trident.

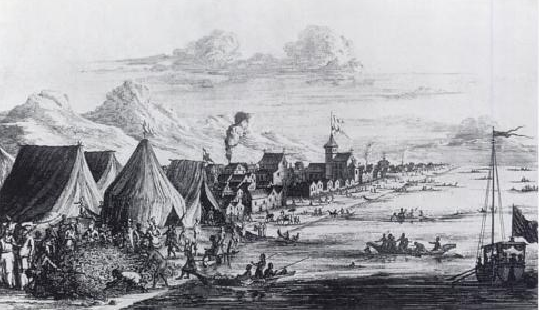
Pearl fishery at Tuticorin camp of paravar, 1662, by Johan Nieuhof.

In India, the Pandyas, a classical Dravidian Tamil kingdom, were known for the pearl fishery as early as the 1st century BC. Their seaport Tuticorin was known for deep sea pearl fishing. The paravas, a Tamil caste centred in Tuticorin, developed a rich community because of their pearl trade, navigation knowledge and fisheries.

In Norse mythology the sea giantess Rán uses a fishing net to trap lost sailors.

The Moche people of ancient Peru depicted fisherman in their ceramics.

From ancient representations and literature it is clear that fishing boats were typically small, lacking a mast or sail, and were only used close to the shore.

In traditional Chinese history, history begins with three semi-mystical and legendary individuals who taught the Chinese the arts of civilization around 2800–2600 BC: of these Fuxi was reputed to be the inventor of writing, hunting, trapping, and fishing.

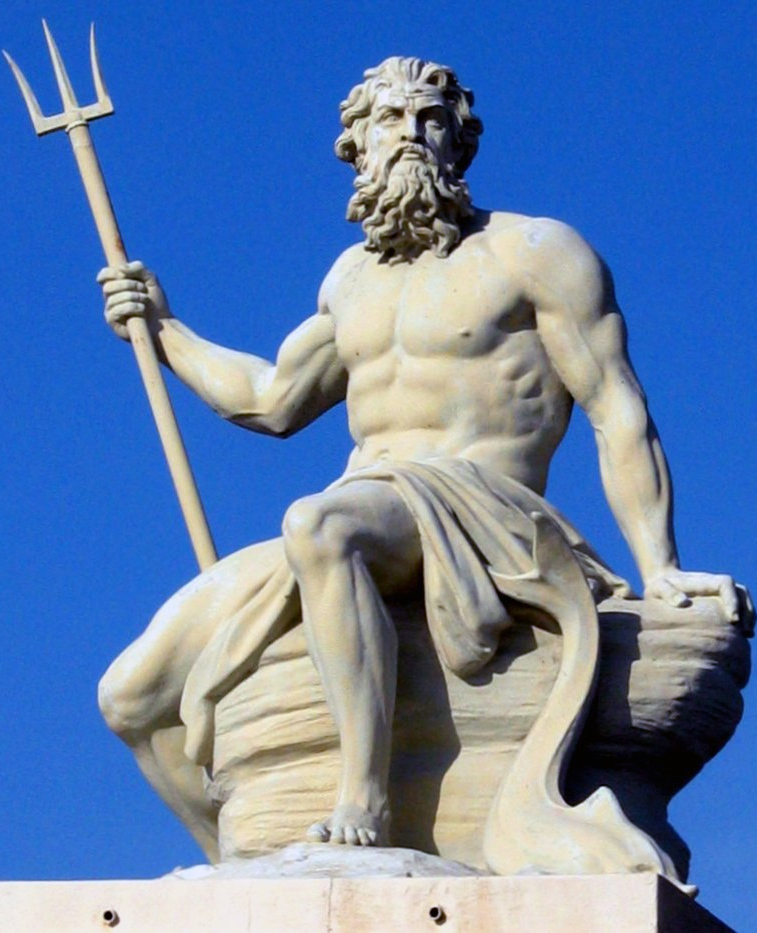
Poseidon/Neptune sculpture in Copenhagen Port.

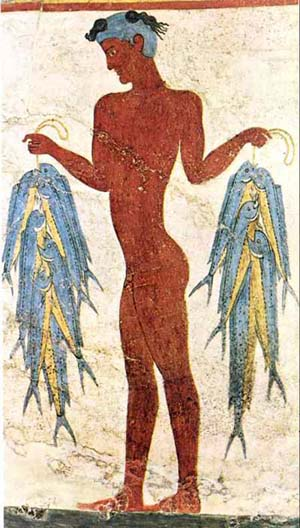
Fresco of a fisherman from the Bronze Age excavation of the Minoan town Akrotiri on the Greek island of Santorini.

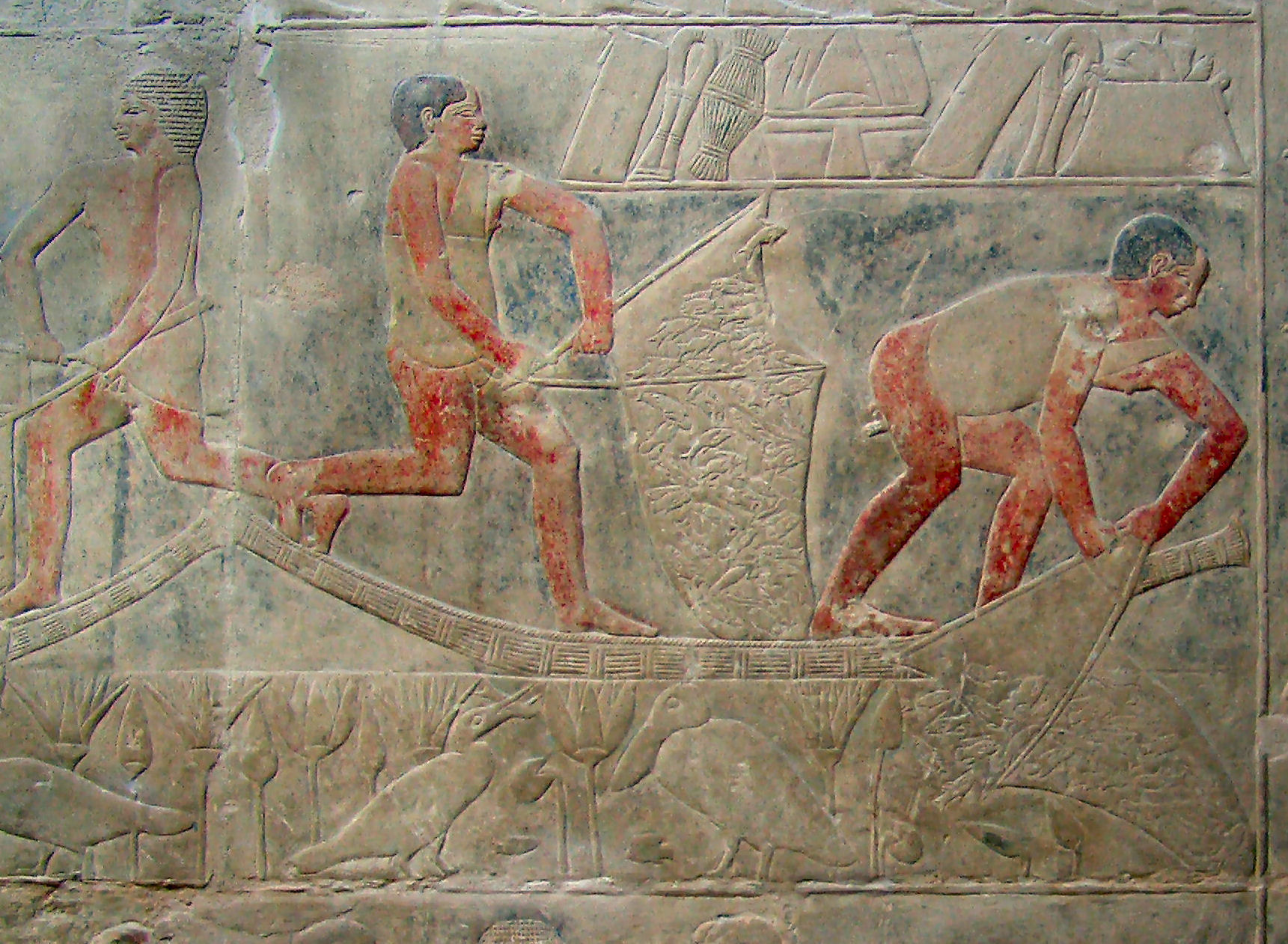
Relief of fishermen collecting their catch from Mereruka's tomb, 6th dynasty

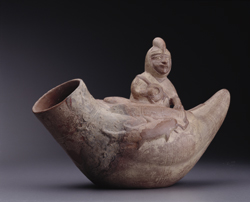
Moche fisherman. 300 A.D. Larco Museum Collection Lima, Peru.

=== Gillnet ===
Gillnets existed in ancient times as archaeological evidence from the Middle East demonstrates. In North America, aboriginal fishermen used cedar canoes and natural fibre nets, e.g., made with nettels or the inner bark of cedar. They would attach stones to the bottom of the nets as weights, and pieces of wood to the top, to use as floats. This allowed the net to suspend straight up and down in the water. Each net would be suspended either from shore or between two boats. Native fishers in the Pacific Northwest, Canada, and Alaska still commonly use gillnets in their fisheries for salmon and steelhead.

Both drift gillnets and setnets also have been widely adapted in cultures around the world. The antiquity of gillnet technology is documented by a number of sources from many countries and cultures. Japanese records trace fisheries exploitation, including gillnetting, for over 3,000 years. Many relevant details are available concerning the Edo period (1603–1867). Fisheries in the Shetland Islands, which were settled by Norsemen during the Viking era, share cultural and technological similarities with Norwegian fisheries, including gillnet fisheries for herring. Many of the Norwegian immigrant fishermen who came to fish in the great Columbia River salmon fishery during the second half of the 19th century did so because they had experience in the gillnet fishery for cod in the waters surrounding the Lofoten Islands of northern Norway. Gillnets were used as part of the seasonal round by Swedish fishermen as well. Welsh and English fishermen gillnetted for Atlantic salmon in the rivers of Wales and England in coracles, using hand-made nets, for at least several centuries. These are but a few of the examples of historic gillnet fisheries around the world. Nowadays Gillnets are not used in modern fisheries due to the new regulations and laws put on the commercial fishing industry. The Gillnets would not only kill targeted fish but also harm other unintended inhabitants of the surrounding area, also known as bycatch.

=== Cod trade ===
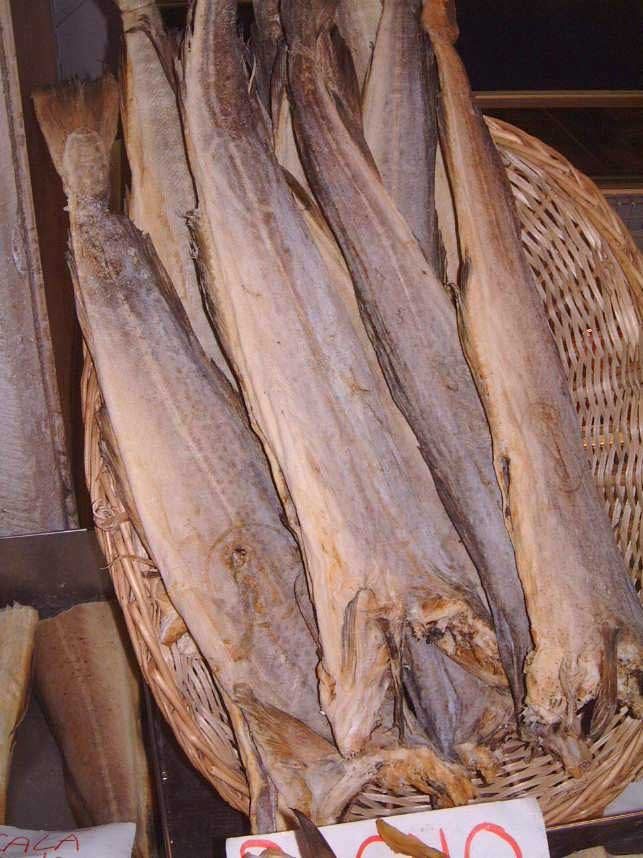
Stockfish

One of the world's longest lasting trade histories is the trade of dry cod from the Lofoten area to the southern parts of Europe, Italy, Spain and Portugal. The trade in cod started during the Viking period or before, has been going on for more than 1000 years and is still important.

Cod has been an important economic commodity in an international market since the Viking period (around 800 AD). Norwegians used dried cod during their travels and soon a dried cod market developed in southern Europe. This market has lasted for more than 1000 years, passing through periods of Black Death, wars and other crises and still is an important Norwegian fish trade. The Portuguese have been fishing cod in the North Atlantic since the 15th century, and clipfish is widely eaten and appreciated in Portugal. The Basques also played an important role in the cod trade and are believed to have found the Canadian fishing banks in the 16th century. The North American east coast developed in part due to the vast amount of cod, and many cities in the New England area spawned near cod fishing grounds.

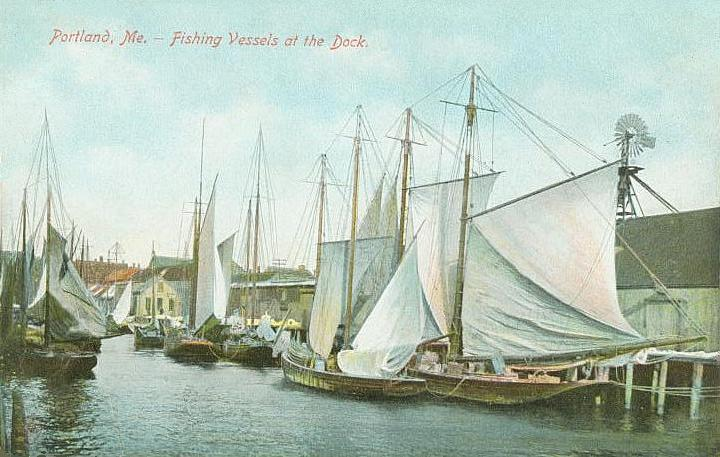
Postcard of fishing vessels at the Portland Dock, Maine, c. 1908.

Apart from the long history this particular trade also differs from most other trade of fish by the location of the fishing grounds, far from large populations and without any domestic market. The large cod fisheries along the coast of North Norway (and in particular close to the Lofoten islands) have been developed almost uniquely for export, depending on sea transport of stockfish over large distances. Since the introduction of salt, dried salt cod ('klippfisk' in Norwegian) has also been exported. The trade operations and the sea transport were by the end of the 14th century taken over by the Hanseatic League, Bergen being the most important port of trade.

William Pitt the Elder, criticizing the Treaty of Paris in Parliament, claimed that cod was "British gold"; and that it was folly to restore Newfoundland fishing rights to the French. In the 17th and 18th centuries, the New World, especially in Massachusetts and Newfoundland, cod became a major commodity, forming trade networks and cross-cultural exchanges.

== Modern trawling ==
=== Early modern designs ===
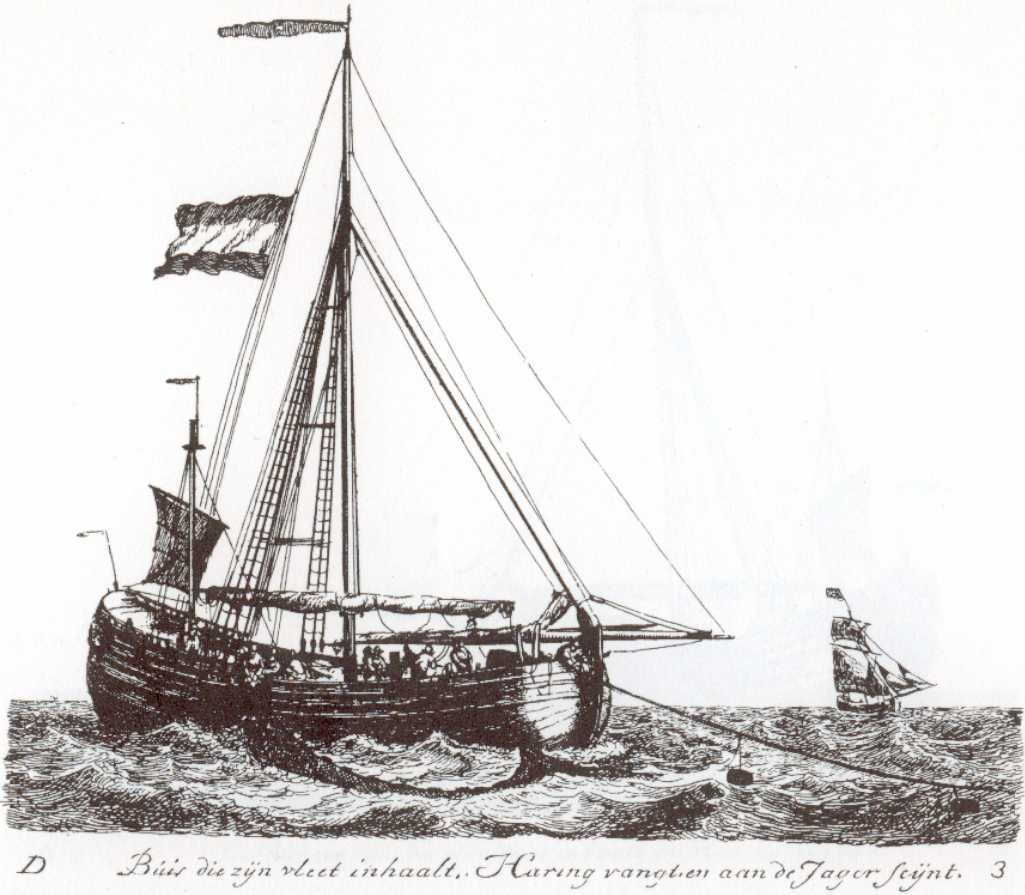
Herring Buss taking aboard its drift net (G. Groenewegen)

In the 15th century, the Dutch developed a type of seagoing herring drifter that became a blueprint for European fishing boats. This was the Herring Buss, used by Dutch herring fishermen until the early 19th centuries. The ship type buss has a long history. It was known around 1000 AD in Scandinavia as a bǘza, a robust variant of the Viking longship. The first herring buss was probably built in Hoorn around 1415. The last one was built in Vlaardingen in 1841.

The ship was about 20 metres long and displaced between 60 and 100 tons. It was a massive round-bilged keel ship with a bluff bow and stern, the latter relatively high, and with a gallery. The busses used long drifting gill nets to catch the herring. The nets would be retrieved at night and the crews of eighteen to thirty men would set to gibbing, salting and barrelling the catch on the broad deck. The ships sailed in fleets of 400 to 500 ships to the Dogger Bank fishing grounds and the Shetland isles. They were usually escorted by naval vessels, because the English considered they were "poaching". The fleet would stay at sea for weeks at a time. The catch would sometimes be transferred to special ships (called ventjagers), and taken home while the fleet would still be at sea (the picture shows a ventjager in the distance).

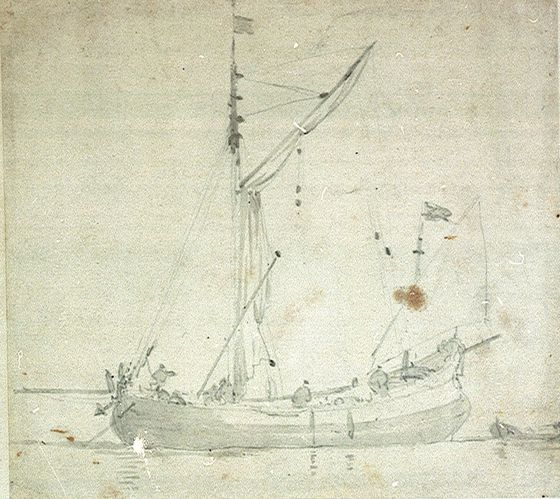
A dogger viewed from before the port beam. c. 1675 by Willem van de Velde the Younger

During the 17th century, the British developed the dogger, an early type of sailing trawler or longliner, which commonly operated in the North Sea. The dogger takes its name from the Dutch word dogger, meaning a fishing vessel which tows a trawl. Dutch trawling boats were common in the North Sea, and the word dogger was given to the area where they often fished, which became known as the Dogger Bank.

Doggers were slow but sturdy, capable of fishing in the rough conditions of the North Sea. Like the herring buss, they were wide-beamed and bluff-bowed, but considerably smaller, about 15 metres long, a maximum beam of 4.5 metres, a draught of 1.5 metres, and displacing about 13 tonnes. They could carry a tonne of bait, three tonnes of salt, half a tonne each of food and firewood for the crew, and return with six tonnes of fish. Decked areas forward and aft probably provided accommodation, storage and a cooking area. An anchor would have allowed extended periods fishing in the same spot, in waters up to 18 metres deep. The dogger would also have carried a small open boat for maintaining lines and rowing ashore.

A banks dory used for cod fishing from the Gazela

A precursor to the dory type was the early French bateau type, a flat bottom boat with straight sides used as early as 1671 on the Saint Lawrence River. The common coastal boat of the time was the wherry and the merging of the wherry design with the simplified flat bottom of the bateau resulted in the birth of the dory. Anecdotal evidence exists of much older precursors throughout Europe. England, France, Italy, and Belgium have small boats from medieval periods that could reasonably be construed as predecessors of the Dory.

Dories appeared in New England fishing towns sometime after the early 18th century. They were small, shallow-draft boats, usually about five to seven metres (15 to 22 feet) long. Lightweight and versatile, with high sides, a flat bottom and sharp bows, they were easy and cheap to build. The Banks dories appeared in the 1830s. They were designed to be carried on mother ships and used for fishing cod at the Grand Banks. Adapted almost directly from the low freeboard, French river bateaus, with their straight sides and removable thwarts, bank dories could be nested inside each other and stored on the decks of fishing schooners, such as the Gazela Primeiro, for their trip to the Grand Banks fishing grounds.

=== Modern fishing trawler ===
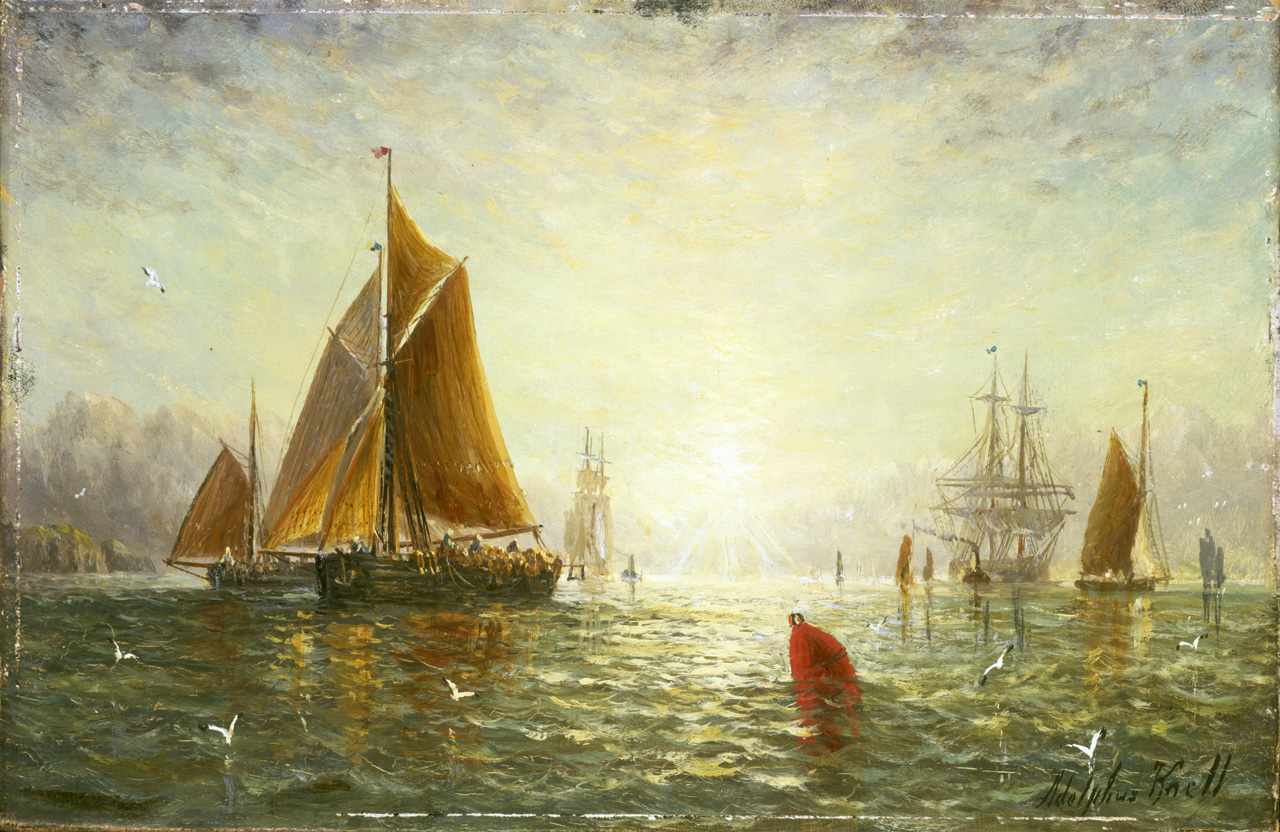
Painting of a Brixham trawler by William Adolphus Knell. The painting is now in the National Maritime Museum.

The British dogger was an early type of sailing trawler from the 17th century, but the modern fishing trawler was developed in the 19th century, at the English fishing port of Brixham.

By the early 19th century, the fishermen at Brixham needed to expand their fishing area further than ever before due to the ongoing depletion of stocks that was occurring in the overfished waters of South Devon. The Brixham trawler that evolved there was of a sleek build and had a tall gaff rig, which gave the vessel sufficient speed to make long-distance trips out to the fishing grounds in the ocean. They were also sufficiently robust to be able to tow large trawls in deep water. The great trawling fleet that built up at Brixham, earned the village the title of 'Mother of Deep-Sea Fisheries'.

This revolutionary design made large scale trawling in the ocean possible for the first time, resulting in a massive migration of fishermen from the ports in the South of England, to villages further north, such as Scarborough, Hull, Grimsby, Harwich and Yarmouth, that were points of access to the large fishing grounds in the Atlantic Ocean.

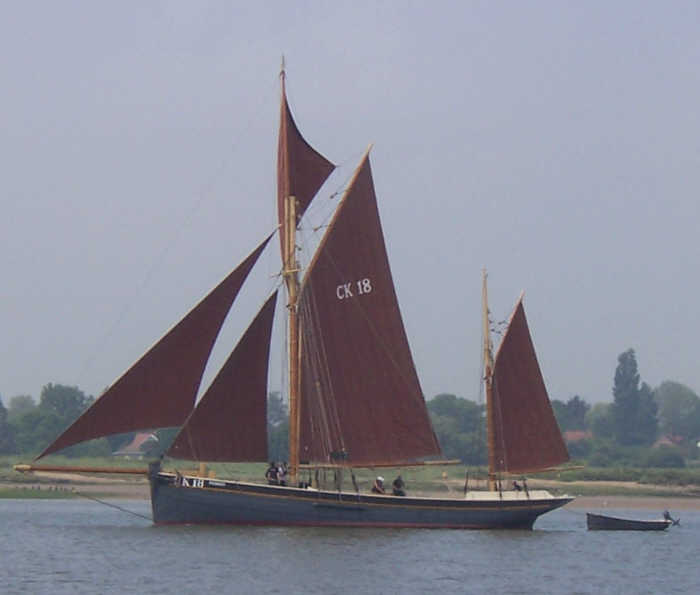
A smack near Brightlingsea.

The small village of Grimsby grew to become the 'largest fishing port in the world' by the mid 19th century. An Act of Parliament was first obtained in 1796, which authorised the construction of new quays and dredging of the Haven to make it deeper. It was only in the 1846, with the tremendous expansion in the fishing industry, that the Grimsby Dock Company was formed. The foundation stone for the Royal Dock was laid by Albert the Prince consort in 1849. The dock covered 25 acres (10 ha) and was formally opened by Queen Victoria in 1854 as the first modern fishing port. The facilities incorporated many innovations of the time - the dock gates and cranes were operated by hydraulic power, and the 300-foot (91 m) Grimsby Dock Tower was built to provide a head of water with sufficient pressure by William Armstrong. The docks expanded steadily over the course of the following century: No. 2 Fish Dock opened in 1877, the Union Dock and Alexandra Dock in 1879, and No. 3 Fish Dock was built in 1934. The port was served by a rail link to London's Billingsgate Fish Market, which created a truly national market for Grimsby's fish, allowing it to become renowned nationwide.

The elegant Brixham trawler spread across the world, influencing fishing fleets everywhere. Their distinctive sails inspired the song Red Sails in the Sunset, written aboard a Brixham sailing trawler called the Torbay Lass. By the end of the 19th century, there were over 3,000 fishing trawlers in commission in Britain, with almost 1,000 at Grimsby. These trawlers were sold to fishermen around Europe, including from Holland and Scandinavia. Twelve trawlers went on to form the nucleus of the German fishing fleet.

Although fishing vessel designs increasingly began to converge around the world, local conditions still often led the development of different types of fishing boats. The Lancashire nobby was used down the north west coast of England as a shrimp trawler from 1840 until World War II. The Manx nobby was used around the Isle of Man as a herring drifter. The fifie was also used as a herring drifter along the east coast of Scotland from the 1850s until well into the 20th century.

The bawley and the smack were used in the Thames Estuary and off East Anglia, while trawlers and drifters were used on the east coast. Herring fishing started in the Moray Firth in 1819. The peak of the fishing at Aberdeen was in 1937 with 277 steam trawlers, though the first diesel drifter was introduced in 1926. In 1870 paddle tugs were being used to tow luggers and smacks to sea.

==== Advent of steam power ====
The earliest steam powered fishing boats first appeared in the 1870s and used the trawl system of fishing as well as lines and drift nets. These were large boats, usually 80–90 feet (24–27 m) in length with a beam of around 20 feet (6.1 m). They weighed 40-50 tons and travelled at 9–11 knots (17–20 km/h; 10–13 mph).

The earliest purpose built fishing vessels were designed and made by David Allan in Leith in March 1875, when he converted a drifter to steam power. In 1877, he built the first screw propelled steam trawler in the world. This vessel was Pioneer LH854. She was of wooden construction with two masts and carried a gaff rigged main and mizen using booms, and a single foresail. Pioneer is mentioned in The Shetland Times of 4 May 1877. In 1878 he completed Forward and Onward, steam-powered trawlers for sale. Allan argued that his motivation for steam power was to increase the safety of fishermen. However local fishermen saw power trawling as a threat. Allan built a total of ten boats at Leith between 1877 and 1881. Twenty-one boats were completed at Granton, his last vessel being Degrave in 1886. Most of these were sold to foreign owners in France, Belgium, Spain and the West Indies.

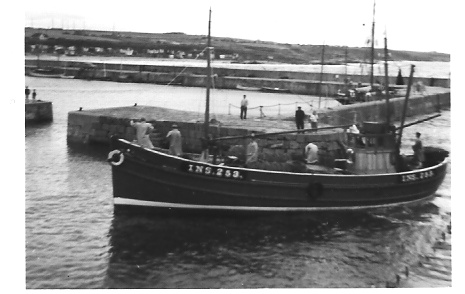
Seine net trawler, Hopeman 1958.

The first steam boats were made of wood, but steel hulls were soon introduced and were divided into watertight compartments. They were well designed for the crew with a large building that contained the wheelhouse and the deckhouse. The boats built in the 20th century only had a mizzen sail, which was used to help steady the boat when its nets were out. The main function of the mast was now as a crane for lifting the catch ashore. It also had a steam capstan on the foredeck near the mast for hauling nets. The boats had narrow, high funnels so that the steam and thick coal smoke was released high above the deck and away from the fishermen. These funnels were nicknamed woodbines because they looked like the popular brand of cigarette. These boats had a crew of twelve made up of a skipper, driver, fireman (to look after the boiler) and nine deck hands.

Steam fishing boats had many advantages. They were usually about 20 ft longer (6.1 m) than the sailing vessels so they could carry more nets and catch more fish. This was important, as the market was growing quickly at the beginning of the 20th century. They could travel faster and further and with greater freedom from weather, wind and tide. Because less time was spent travelling to and from the fishing grounds, more time could be spent fishing. The steam boats also gained the highest prices for their fish, as they could return quickly to harbour with their fresh catch. The main disadvantage of the steam boats, though, was their high operating costs. Their engines were mechanically inefficient and took up much space, while fuel and fitting out costs were very high. Before the First World War, building costs were between £3,000 and £4,000, at least three times the cost of the sail boats. To cover these high costs, they needed to fish for longer seasons. The higher expenses meant that more steam drifters were company-owned or jointly owned. As the herring fishing industry declined, steam boats became too expensive.

Steam trawlers were introduced at Grimsby and Hull in the 1880s. In 1890 it was estimated that there were 20,000 men on the North Sea. The steam drifter was not used in the herring fishery until 1897. The last sailing fishing trawler was built in 1925 in Grimsby.

==== Further development ====
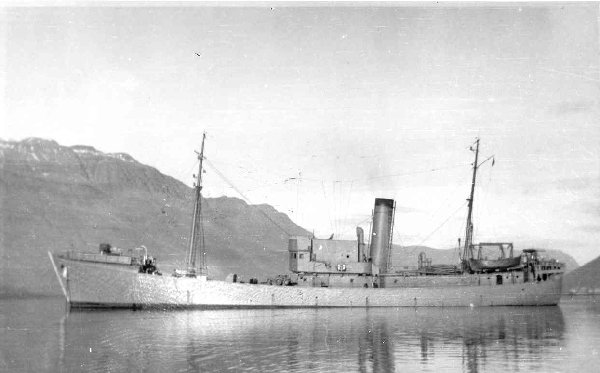
Armed trawler HNoMS Honningsvåg off Iceland.

Trawler designs adapted as the way they were powered changed from sail to coal-fired steam by World War I to diesel and turbines by the end of World War II.

During both World Wars, many fishing trawlers were commissioned as naval trawlers. Fishing trawlers were particularly suited to many naval requirements because they were robust boats designed to work heavy trawls in all types of weather and had large, clear working decks. A mine sweeper could be created simply by replacing the trawl with a mine sweep. Adding depth charge racks on the deck, ASDIC below, and a 3-inch (76 mm) or 4-inch (102 mm) gun in the bows equipped the trawler for anti-submarine duties.

The Royal Navy ordered many naval trawlers to Admiralty specifications. Shipyards such as Smiths Dock Company that were used to building fishing trawlers could easily switch to constructing naval versions. As a bonus, the Admiralty could sell these trawlers to commercial fishing interests when the wars ended. Still, many were sunk during the war, such as HMT Amethyst and HMT Force.

Armed trawlers were also used to defend fishing groups from enemy aircraft or submarines. The smallest civilian trawlers were converted to danlayers.

In 1931, the first powered drum was created by Laurie Jarelainen. The drum was a circular device set to the side of the boat that would draw in the nets. The powered drum allowed nets to be drawn in much faster, so fishermen were able to fish in areas they had previously been unable to reach, thereby revolutionising the fishing industry.

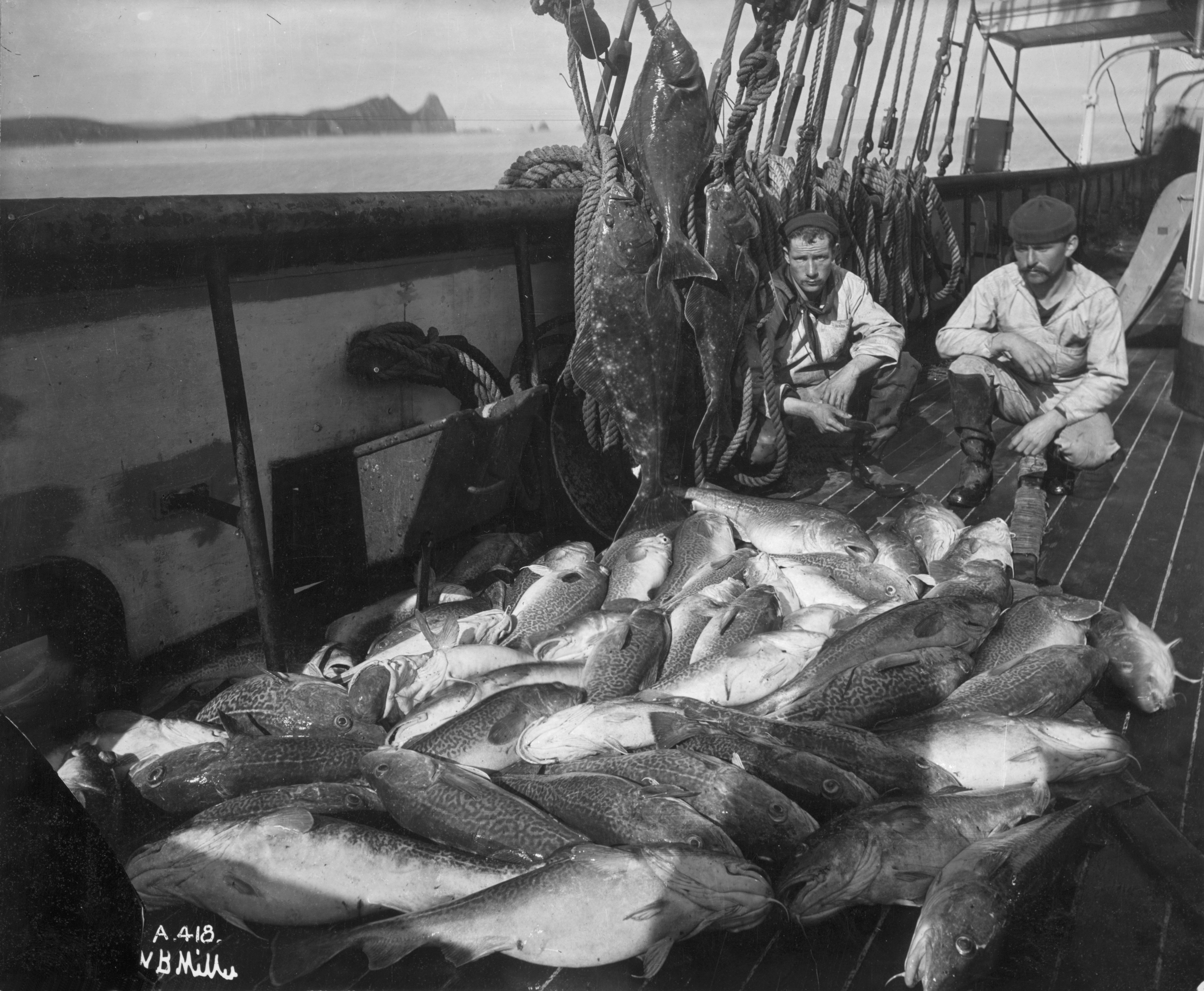
Commercial fishermen in Alaska, early 20th century.

During World War II, navigation and communication devices, as well as many other forms of maritime equipment (depth-sounding and radar), were improved and made more compact. These devices became much more accessible to the average fisherman, thereby increasing range and mobility. It also made the industry more competitive, as fishermen were forced to invest more in their boats, equipping them with electronic aids such as radio navigation aids and fish finders. During the Cold War, some countries fitted fishing trawlers with additional electronic gear so they could be used as spy ships to monitor the activities of other countries.

The first trawlers fished over the side, rather than over the stern. In 1947, the company Christian Salvesen, based in Leith, Scotland, refitted a surplus Algerine-class minesweeper (HMS Felicity) with refrigeration equipment and a factory ship stern ramp, producing the first combined freezer/stern trawler.

The first purpose-built stern trawler was Fairtry, built in 1953 at Aberdeen. The ship was much larger than any other trawlers then in operation and inaugurated the era of the 'super trawler'. As the ship pulled its nets over the stern, it could lift out a much greater haul of up to 60 tons. Lord Nelson followed in 1961, installed with vertical plate freezers that had been researched and built at the Torry Research Station. These ships served as a basis for the expansion of 'super trawlers' around the world in the following decades.

The introduction of fine synthetic fibres such as nylon in the construction of fishing gear during the 1960s marked an expansion in the commercial use of gillnets. The new materials were cheaper and easier to handle, lasted longer, and required less maintenance than natural fibres. In addition, fibres such as nylon monofilaments become almost invisible in water, so nets made with synthetic twines generally caught greater numbers of fish than natural fibre nets used in comparable situations. Due to environmental concerns, gillnets were banned by the United Nations in 1993 in international waters, although their use is still permitted within 200 nautical miles (400 km) of a coast.

== Recreational fishing ==
The early evolution of fishing as recreation is not clear. For example, there is anecdotal evidence for fly fishing in Japan as early as the ninth century BC, and in Europe Claudius Aelianus (175–235 AD) describes fly fishing in his work On the Nature of Animals.

But for the early Japanese and Macedonians, fly fishing was likely to have been a means of survival, rather than recreation. It is possible that antecedents of recreational fly fishing arrived in England with the Norman Conquest of 1066. Although the point in history where fishing could first be said to be recreational is not clear, it is clear that recreational fishing had fully arrived with the publication of the 1653 book The Compleat Angler.

=== Origins ===
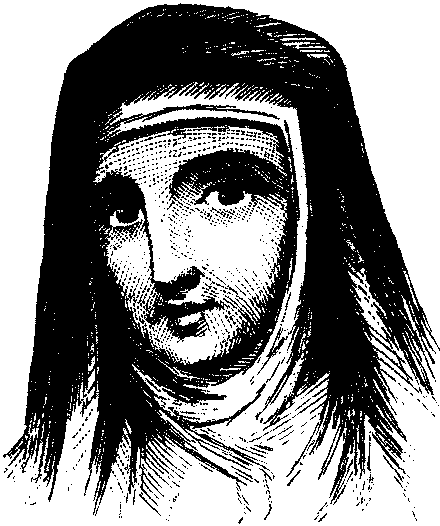
Sketch of Juliana Berners, author of the earliest essay on recreational fishing.

The earliest English essay on recreational fishing was published in 1496, shortly after the invention of the printing press. The authorship of this was attributed to Dame Juliana Berners, the prioress of the Benedictine Sopwell Nunnery. The essay was titled Treatyse of Fysshynge wyth an Angle, and was published in the second Boke of Saint Albans, a treatise on hawking, hunting, and heraldry. These were major interests of the nobility, and the publisher, Wynkyn de Worde, was concerned that the book should be kept from those who were not gentlemen, since their immoderation in angling might "utterly destroy it".

During the 16th century the work was much read, and was reprinted many times. Treatyse includes detailed information on fishing waters, the construction of rods and lines, and the use of natural baits and artificial flies. It also includes modern concerns about conservation and angler etiquette.

The earliest English poetical treatise on Angling by John Dennys, said to have been a fishing companion of Shakespeare, was published in 1613, The Secrets of Angling. Footnotes of the work, written by Dennys' editor, William Lawson, make the first mention of the phrase to 'cast a fly': "The trout gives the most gentlemanly and readiest sport of all, if you fish with an artificial fly, a line twice your rod's length of three hairs' thickness... and if you have learnt the cast of the fly."

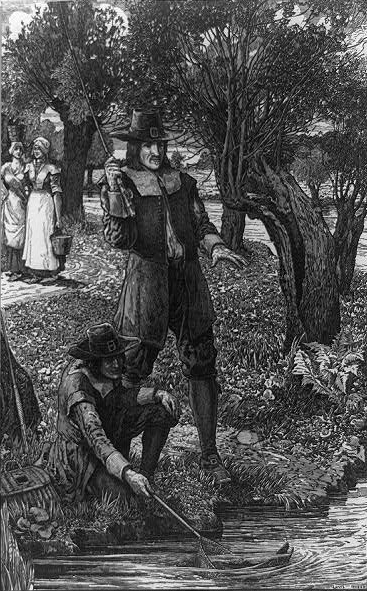
Izaak Walton's Compleat Angler, published in 1653 helped popularize fly fishing as a sport. Woodcut by Louis Rhead

The art of fly fishing took a great leap forward after the English Civil War, where a newly found interest in the activity left its mark on the many books and treatises that were written on the subject at the time. The renowned officer in the Parliamentary army, Robert Venables, published in 1662 The Experienced Angler, or Angling improved, being a general discourse of angling, imparting many of the aptest ways and choicest experiments for the taking of most sorts of fish in pond or river. Another Civil War veteran to enthusiastically take up fishing was Richard Franck. He was the first to describe salmon fishing in Scotland, and both in that and trout-fishing with artificial fly he was a practical angler. He was the first angler to name the burbot, and commended the salmon of the River Thames.

Compleat Angler was written by Izaak Walton in 1653 (although Walton continued to add to it for a quarter of a century) and described the fishing in the Derbyshire Wye. It was a celebration of the art and spirit of fishing in prose and verse; 6 verses were quoted from John Dennys's earlier work. A second part to the book was added by Walton's friend Charles Cotton.

Walton did not profess to be an expert with a fishing fly; the fly fishing in his first edition was contributed by Thomas Barker, a retired cook and humorist, who produced a treatise of his own in 1659; but in the use of the live worm, the grasshopper and the frog "Piscator" himself could speak as a master. The famous passage about the frog, often misquoted as being about the worm—"use him as though you loved him, that is, harm him as little as you may possibly, that he may live the longer"—appears in the original edition. Cotton's additions completed the instruction in fly fishing and advised on the making of artificial flies where he listed sixty five varieties.

Charles Kirby designed an improved fishing hook in 1655 that remains relatively unchanged to this day. He went on to invent the Kirby bend, a distinctive hook with an offset point, still commonly used today.

=== Development ===
Trading card of the Ustonson company, an early firm specializing in fishing equipment, and holder of a Royal Warrant from the 1760s.

The 18th century was mainly an era of consolidation of the techniques developed in the previous century. Running rings began to appear along the fishing rods, which gave anglers greater control over the cast line. The rods themselves were also becoming increasingly sophisticated and specialized for different roles. Jointed rods became common from the middle of the century and bamboo came to be used for the top section of the rod, giving it a much greater strength and flexibility.

The industry also became commercialized - rods and tackle were sold at the haberdashers store. After the Great Fire of London in 1666, artisans moved to Redditch which became a centre of production of fishing related products from the 1730s. Onesimus Ustonson established his trading shop in 1761, and his establishment remained as a market leader for the next century. He received a Royal Warrant from three successive monarchs starting with King George IV.

Some have credited Onesimus with the invention of the multiplying winch, although he was certainly the first to advertise its sale. Early multiplying reels were wide and had a small diameter, and their gears, made of brass, often wore down after extensive use. His earliest advertisement in the form of a trading card date from 1768 and was entitled To all lovers of angling. A full list of the tackles he sold included artificial flies, and 'the best sort of multiplying brass winches both stop and plain'. The commercialization of the industry came at a time of expanded interest in fishing as a recreational hobby for members of the aristocracy.

The impact of the Industrial Revolution was first felt in the manufacture of fly lines. Instead of anglers twisting their own lines - a laborious and time-consuming process - the new textile spinning machines allowed for a variety of tapered lines to be easily manufactured and marketed.

British fly-fishing continued to develop in the 19th Century, with the emergence of fly fishing clubs, along with the appearance of several books on the subject of fly tying and fly fishing techniques.

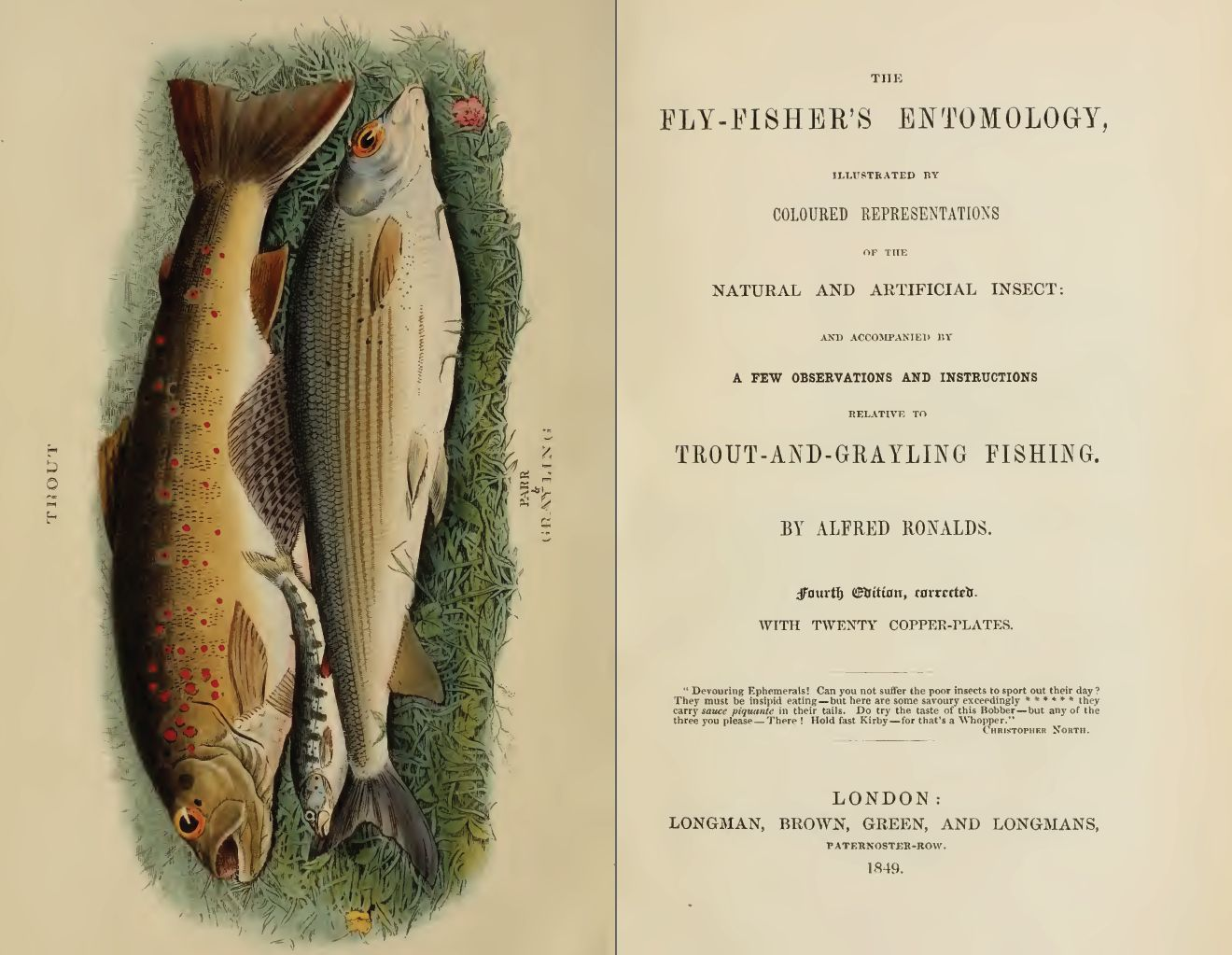
The Fly-fisher's Entomology by Alfred Ronalds had a great influence on the development of fly fishing when it was first published in 1836.

Alfred Ronalds took up the sport of fly fishing, learning the craft on the rivers Trent, Blythe and Dove. On the River Blythe, near what is today Creswell Green, Ronalds constructed a bankside fishing hut designed primarily as an observatory of trout behaviour in the river. From this hut, and elsewhere on his home rivers, Ronalds conducted experiments and formulated the ideas that eventually were published in The Fly-fisher's Entomology in 1836.

He combined his knowledge of fly fishing with his skill as an engraver and printer, to lavish his work with 20 colour plates. It was the first comprehensive work related to the entomology associated with fly fishing and most fly-fishing historians credit Ronalds with setting a literature standard in 1836 that is still followed today. Describing methods, techniques and, most importantly, artificial flies, in a meaningful way for the angler and illustrating them in colour is a method of presentation that can be seen in most fly-fishing literature today.

The book was mostly about the aquatic insects—mayflies, caddisflies and stoneflies—that trout and grayling feed on and their counterpart artificial imitations. About half the book is devoted to observations of trout, their behaviour, and the methods and techniques used to catch them. Most of this information, although enhanced by Ronalds' experiences and observations, was merely an enhancement of Charles Bowlker's Art of Angling (first published in 1774 but still in print in 1836).

In Chapter IV – Of a Selection of Insects, and Their Imitations, Used in Fly Fishing – for the first time is discussed specific artificial fly imitations by name, associated with the corresponding natural insect. Organized by their month of appearance, Ronalds was the first author to begin the standardization of angler names for artificial flies. Prior to The Fly-fisher's Entomology, anglers had been given suggestions for artificial flies to be used on a particular river or at a particular time of the year, but those suggestions were never matched to specific natural insects the angler might encounter on the water. According to Ernest Schwiebert: "Ronalds is one of the major milestones in the entire literature of fly-fishing, and with his Entomology the scientific method has reached angling in full flower. Ronalds was completely original in its content and research, setting the yardstick for all subsequent discussion and illustration of aquatic fly hatches.

=== Technological improvements ===
'Nottingham' and 'Scarborough' reel designs.

Modern reel design had begun in England during the later part of the 18th century, and the predominant model in use was known as the 'Nottingham reel'. The reel was a wide drum which spooled out freely, and was ideal for allowing the bait to drift along way out with the current. Geared multiplying reels never successfully caught on in Britain, but had more success in the United States, where similar models were modified by George Snyder of Kentucky into his bait-casting reel, the first American-made design in 1810.

The material used for the rod itself changed from the heavy woods native to England, to lighter and more elastic varieties imported from abroad, especially from South America and the West Indies. Bamboo rods became the generally favoured option from the mid 19th century, and several strips of the material were cut from the cane, milled into shape, and then glued together to form light, strong, hexagonal rods with a solid core that were superior to anything that preceded them. George Cotton and his predecessors fished their flies with long rods, and light lines allowing the wind to do most of the work of getting the fly to the fish.

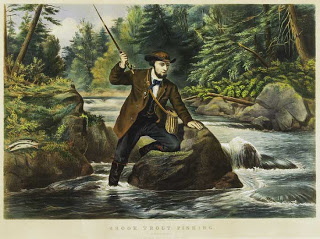
Fishing became a popular recreational activity in the 19th century. Print from Currier and Ives.

Tackle design began to improve from the 1880s. The introduction of new woods to the manufacture of fly rods made it possible to cast flies into the wind on silk lines, instead of horse hair. These lines allowed for a much greater casting distance. However, these early fly lines proved troublesome as they had to be coated with various dressings to make them float and needed to be taken off the reel and dried every four hours or so to prevent them from becoming waterlogged. Another negative consequence was that it became easy for the much longer line to get into a tangle - this was called a 'tangle' in Britain, and a 'backlash' in the US. This problem spurred the invention of the regulator to evenly spool the line out and prevent tangling.

The American, Charles F. Orvis, designed and distributed a novel reel and fly design in 1874, described by reel historian Jim Brown as the "benchmark of American reel design," and the first fully modern fly reel. The founding of The Orvis Company helped institutionalize fly fishing by supplying angling equipment via the circulation of his tackle catalogs, distributed to a small but devoted customer list.

Albert Illingworth, 1st Baron Illingworth a textiles magnate, patented the modern form of fixed-spool spinning reel in 1905. When casting Illingworth's reel design, the line was drawn off the leading edge of the spool, but was restrained and rewound by a line pickup, a device which orbits around the stationary spool. Because the line did not have to pull against a rotating spool, much lighter lures could be cast than with conventional reels.

=== Expansion ===
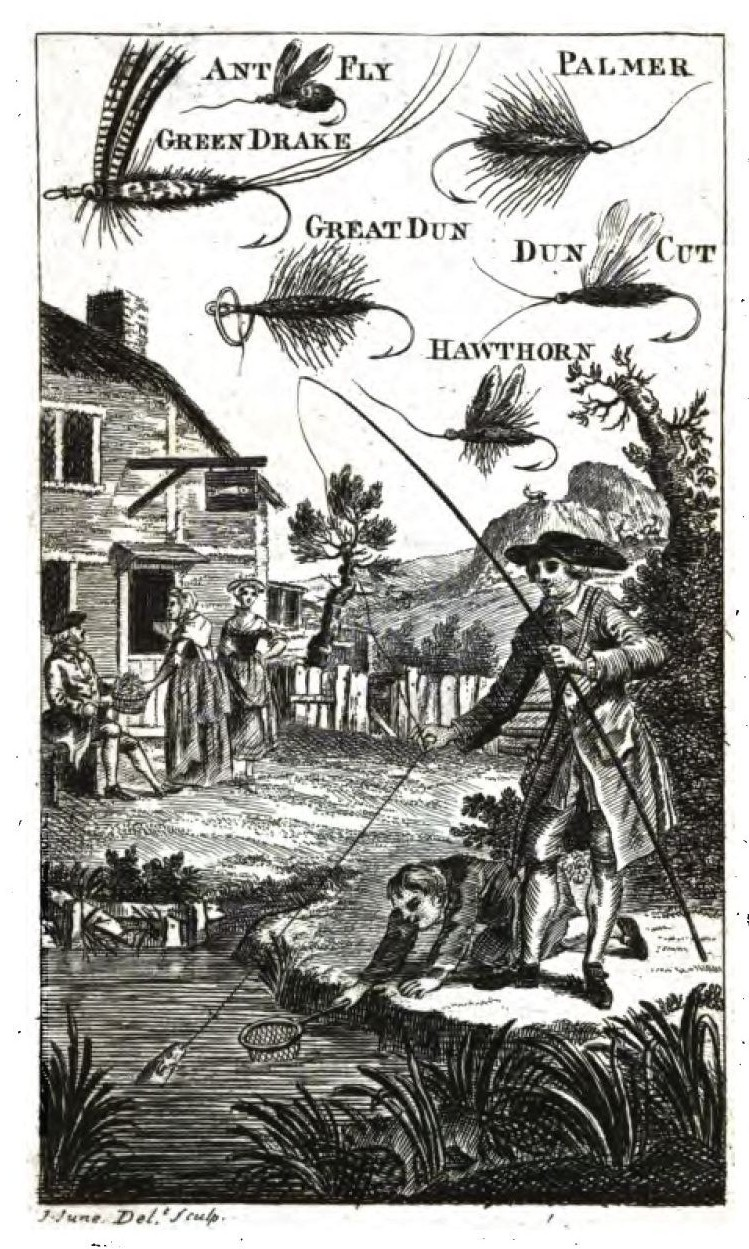
Frontispiece from The Art of Angling by Richard Brookes, 1790

By the mid to late 19th century, expanding leisure opportunities for the middle and lower classes began to have its effect on fly fishing, which steadily grew in mass appeal. The expansion of the railway network in Britain allowed the less affluent for the first time to take weekend trips to the seaside or to rivers for fishing. Richer hobbyists ventured further abroad. The large rivers of Norway replete with large stocks of salmon began to attract fishers from England in large numbers in the middle of the century - Jones's guide to Norway, and salmon-fisher's pocket companion, published in 1848, was written by Frederic Tolfrey and was a popular guide to the country.

In southern England, dry-fly fishing acquired an elitist reputation as the only acceptable method of fishing the slower, clearer rivers of the south such as the River Test and the other chalk streams concentrated in Hampshire, Surrey, Dorset and Berkshire (see Southern England Chalk Formation for the geological specifics). The weeds found in these rivers tend to grow very close to the surface, and it was felt necessary to develop new techniques that would keep the fly and the line on the surface of the stream. These became the foundation of all later dry-fly developments.

However, there was nothing to prevent the successful employment of wet flies on these chalk streams, as G. E. M. Skues proved with his nymph and wet fly techniques. To the horror of dry-fly purists, Skues later wrote two books, Minor Tactics of the Chalk Stream, and The Way of a Trout with a Fly, which greatly influenced the development of wet fly fishing. In northern England and Scotland, many anglers also favored wet-fly fishing, where the technique was more popular and widely practiced than in southern England. One of Scotland's leading proponents of the wet fly in the early-to-mid 19th century was W. C. Stewart, who published "The Practical Angler" in 1857.

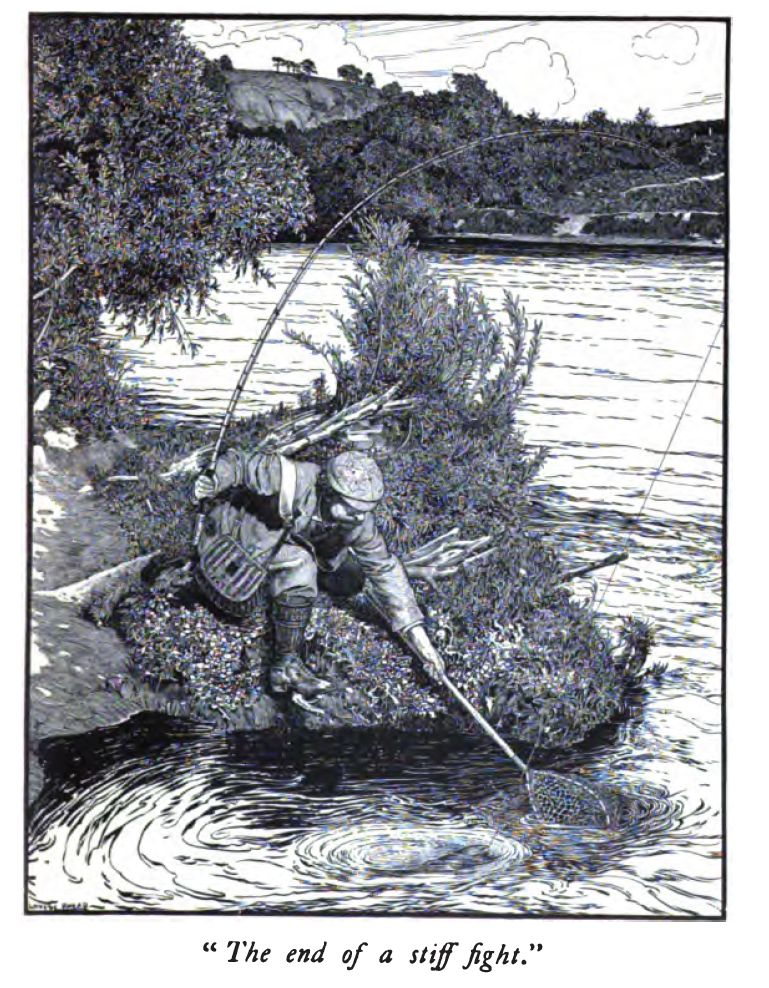
From The Speckled Brook Trout by Louis Rhead (1902)

In the United States, attitudes toward methods of fly fishing were not nearly as rigidly defined, and both dry- and wet-fly fishing were soon adapted to the conditions of the country. Fly anglers there, are thought to be the first anglers to have used artificial lures for bass fishing. After pressing into service the fly patterns and tackle designed for trout and salmon to catch largemouth and smallmouth bass, they began to adapt these patterns into specific bass flies. Fly anglers seeking bass developed the spinner/fly lure and bass popper fly, which are still used today.

In the late 19th century, American anglers, such as Theodore Gordon, in the Catskill Mountains of New York began using fly tackle to fish the region's brook trout-rich streams such as the Beaverkill and Willowemoc Creek. Many of these early American fly anglers also developed new fly patterns and wrote extensively about their sport, increasing the popularity of fly fishing in the region and in the United States as a whole. Albert Bigelow Paine, a New England author, wrote about fly fishing in The Tent Dwellers, a book about a three-week trip he and a friend took to central Nova Scotia in 1908.

Participation in fly fishing peaked in the early 1920s in the eastern states of Maine and Vermont and in the Midwest in the spring creeks of Wisconsin. Along with deep sea fishing, Ernest Hemingway did much to popularize fly fishing through his works of fiction, including The Sun Also Rises.

Fly fishing in Australia took off when brown trout were first introduced by the efforts of Edward Wilson's Acclimatisation Society of Victoria with the aim to "provide for manly sport which will lead Australian youth to seek recreation on the river's bank and mountainside rather than in the Cafe and Casino." The first successful transfer of brown trout ova (from the Itchen and Wye) was accomplished by James Arndell Youl, with a consignment aboard The Norfolk in 1864. Rainbow trout were not introduced until 1894.

It was the development of inexpensive fiberglass rods, synthetic fly lines, and monofilament leaders, however, in the early 1950s, that revived the popularity of fly fishing. In recent years, interest in fly fishing has surged as baby boomers have discovered the sport. Movies such as Robert Redford's film A River Runs Through It, starring Craig Sheffer and Brad Pitt, cable fishing shows, and the emergence of a competitive fly casting circuit have added to the sport's visibility.

== Fishing in art ==
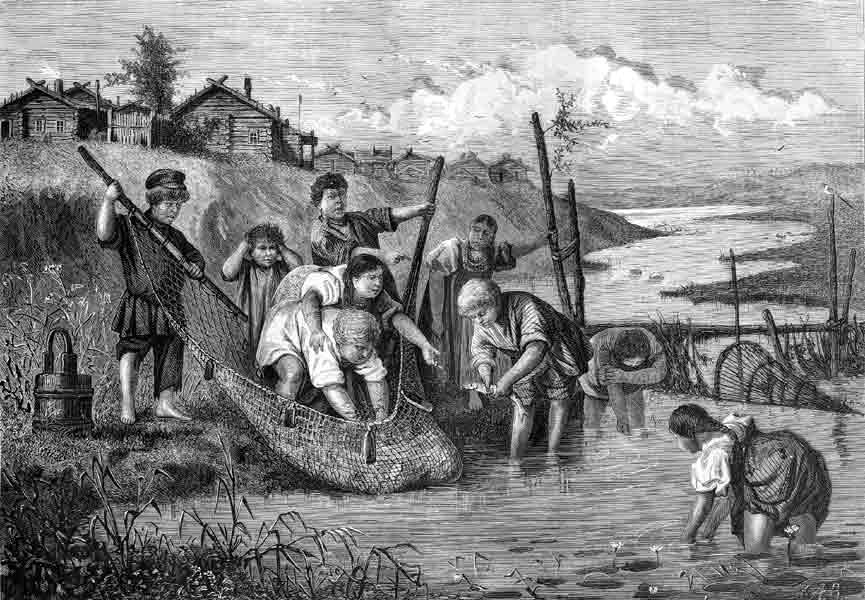
Engraving of Russian peasant children fishing, A.P. Koverznev 1875

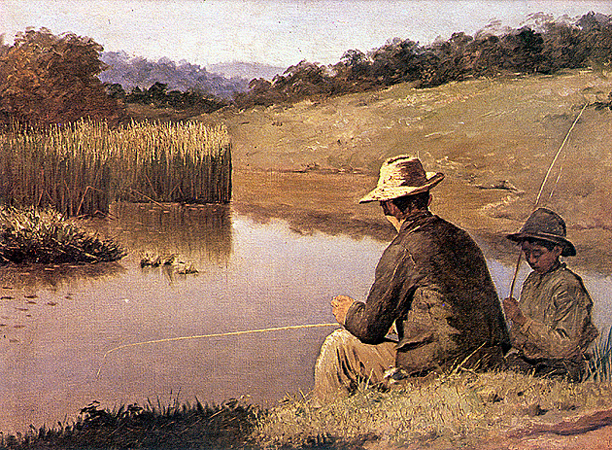
Fishing, Almeida Júnior 1894

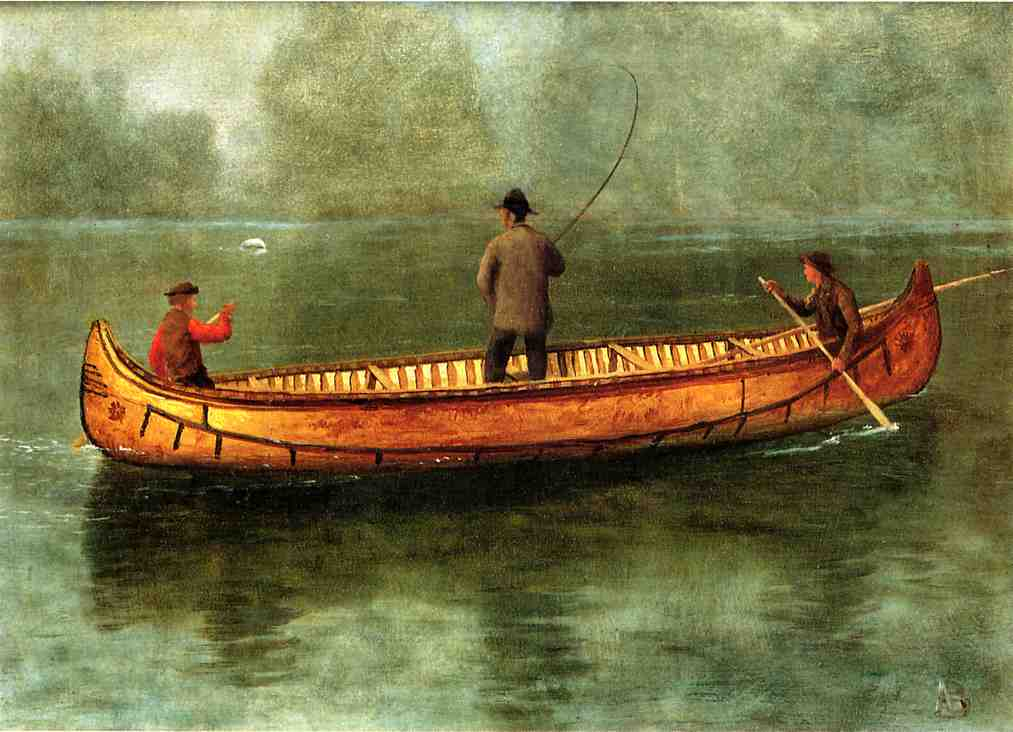
Fishing from a canoe, Albert Bierstadt (1830–1902)

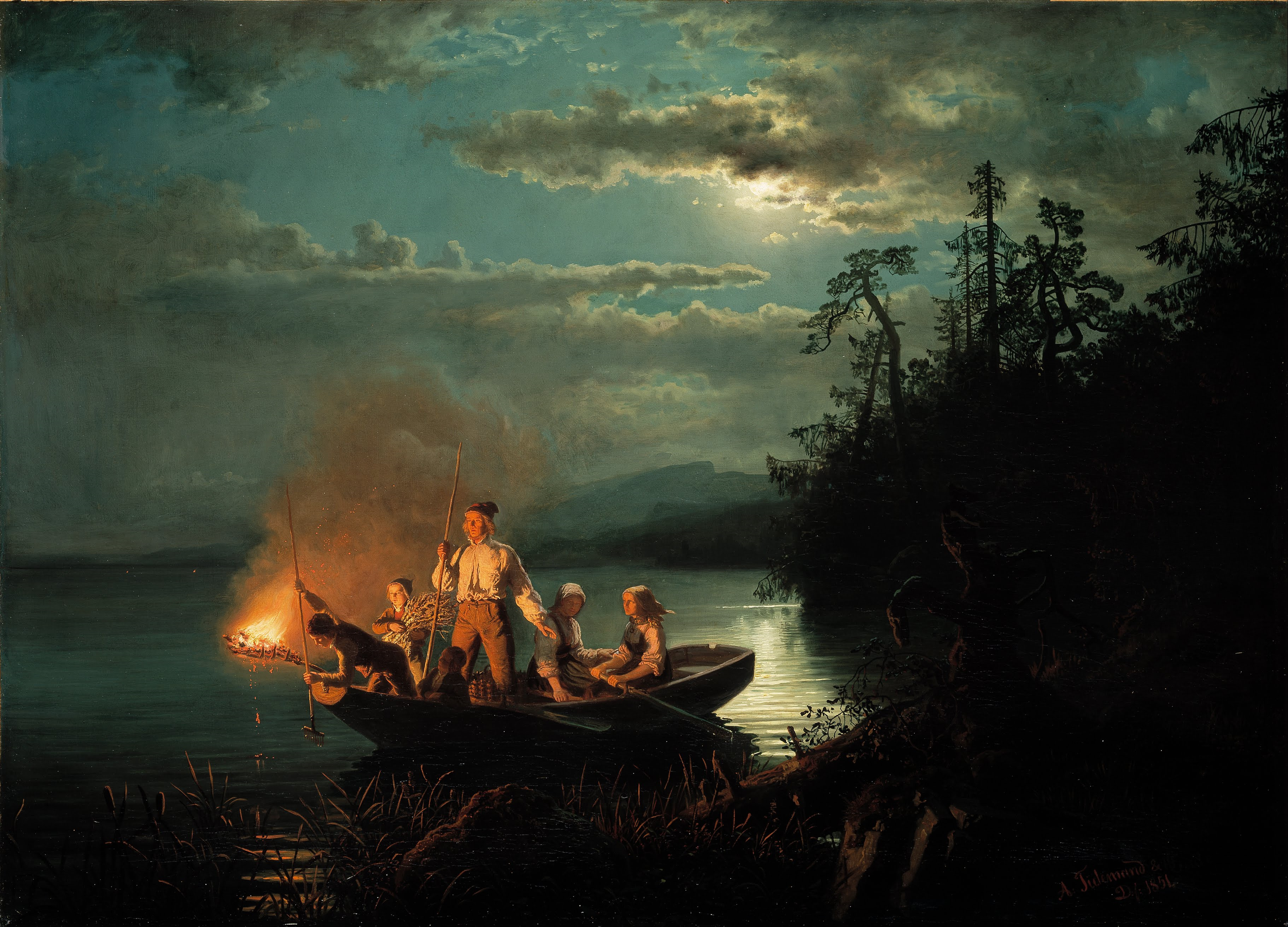
Fishing with a harpoon, Adolph Tidemand and Hans Gude 1851

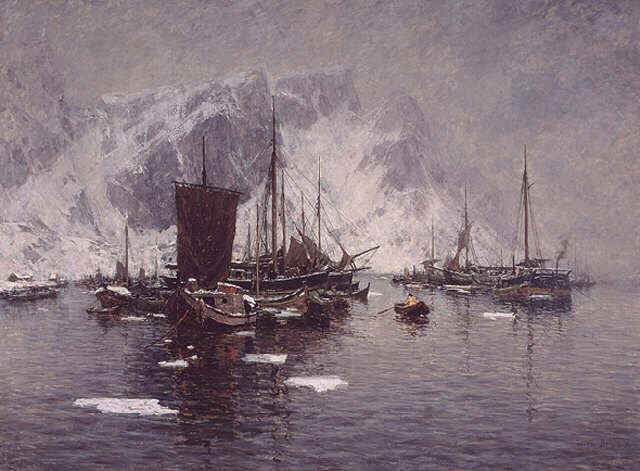
The fishing fleet at Reine, Gunnar Berg (1863–93)

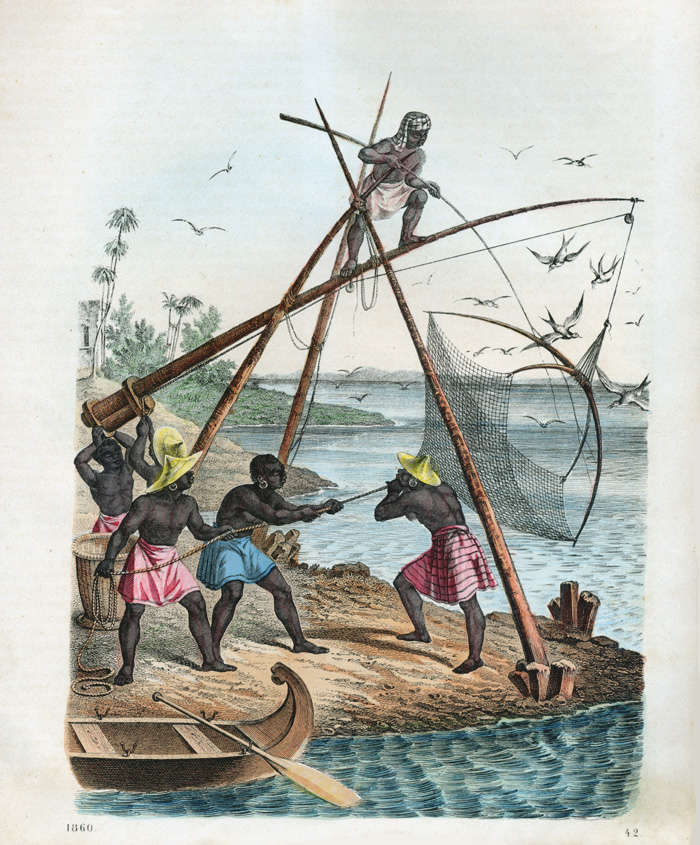
The Chinese fishing nets of Fort Cochin," from 'Das Buch der Welt', Stuttgart, 1842–48

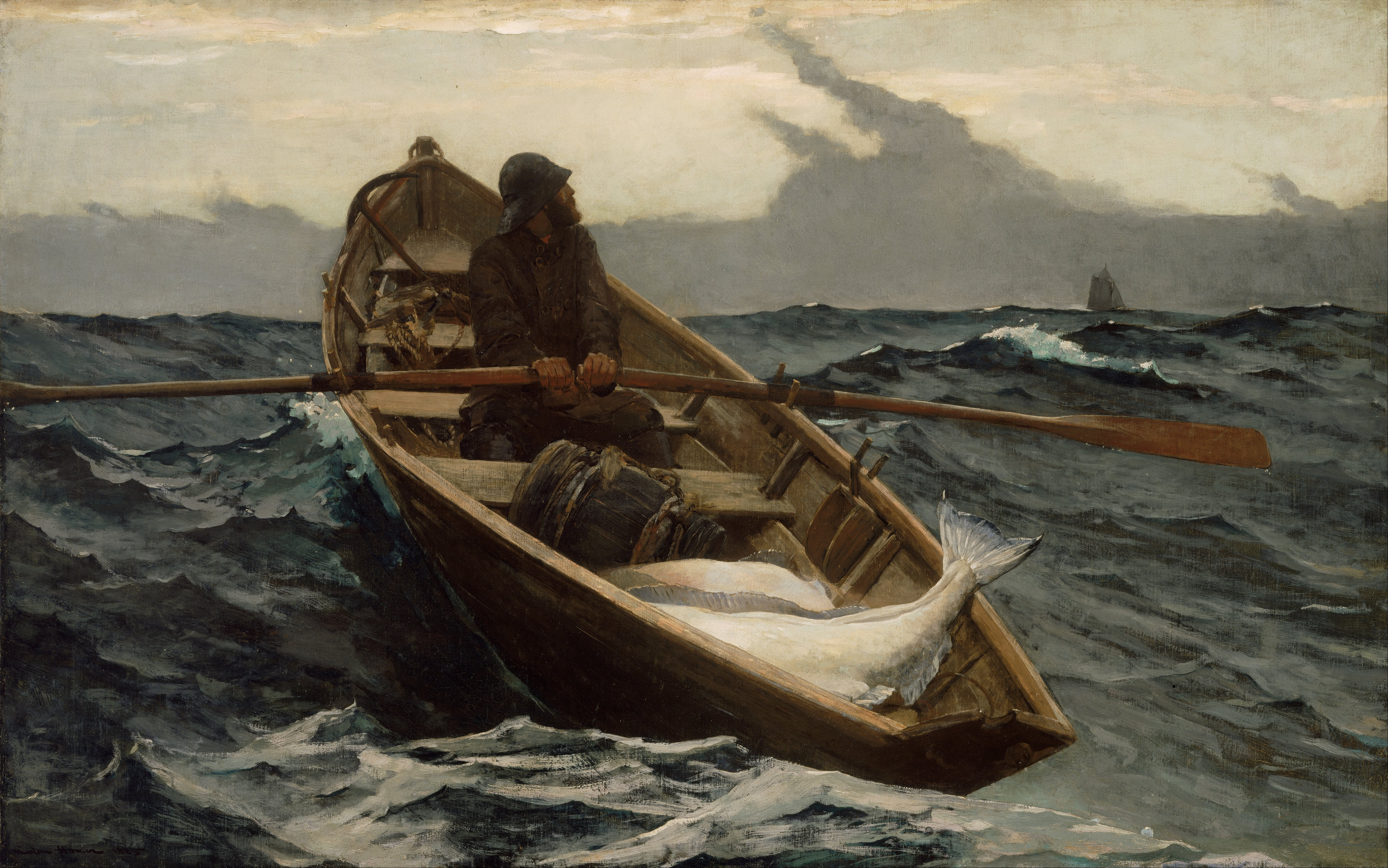
Winslow Homer

== See also ==
- Angling
- Artisanal fishing
- History of seafood
- History of whaling
- List of fishing villages
- Recreational fishing
