= Ptous =

Mythical son of Athamas

In Greek mythology, Ptous (/ˈtoʊəs/; Ancient Greek: Πτῶος) may refer to the following:

- Ptous, eponym of Mount Ptous in Boeotia on which the town Acraephnium was situated. He was believed to have been a son of either Athamas and Themisto, or of Acraepheus and Euxippe, or of Apollo and Zeuxippe, a daughter of Athamas.
- Ptous, also an epithet of Apollo, under which the god was honored in a temple near Acraephnium. The epithet was believed to be linked to the name of the above Ptous as well.
