= Euxippe (mythology) =

In Greek mythology the wife of Acraepheus

In Greek mythology, Euxippe (Ancient Greek: Εὐξίππη) was the wife of Acraepheus, founder of Acraephnium, and became the mother of Ptous, eponym of Mt. Ptous in Boeotia. Otherwise, the latter was also called the son of Athamas and Themisto or Apollo and Zeuxippe, a daughter of Athamas.
