= HMT Force =

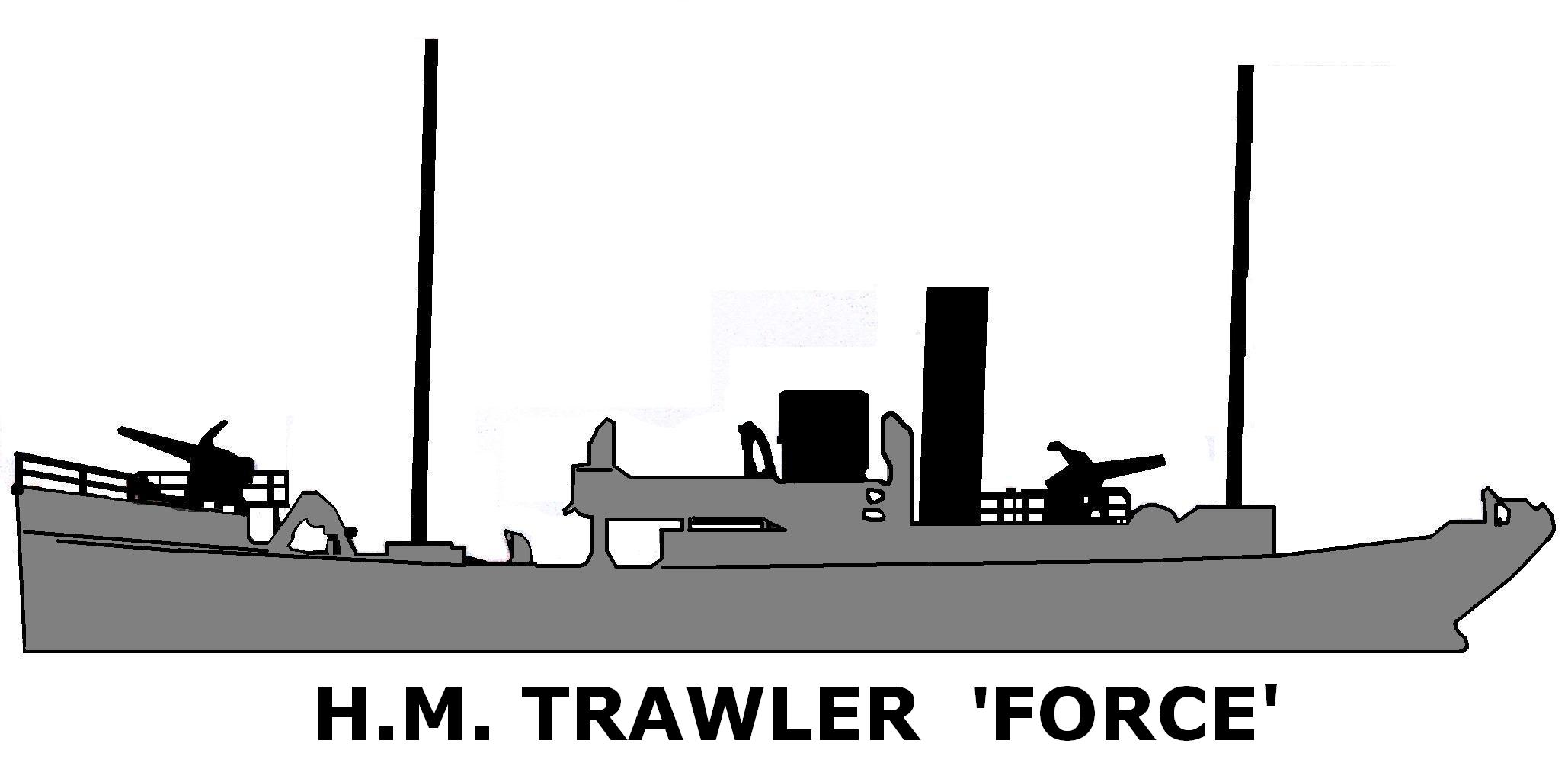
- HM Trawler Force

History

United Kingdom
- Name: HM Trawler James Buchanan
- Builder: Cochrane & Sons Shipbuilders Ltd., Selby
- Yard number: 825
- Launched: 18 September 1917
- Completed: 13 December 1917
- Commissioned: "Accepted" 15 December 1917. Registered by the Admiralty at London 27 November 1919, and again 23 August 1920
- Fate: Sold February 1922

United Kingdom
- Name: Stoneferry
- Owner: City Steam Fishing Company
- Acquired: February 1922
- Homeport: Kingston upon Hull
- Fate: Sold, 1934

United Kingdom
- Name: Cape Tarifa
- Owner: Hudson Fishing Company Ltd.
- Acquired: 1934
- Homeport: Kingston upon Hull
- Fate: Sold, 1938

Poland
- Name: Franciszka
- Owner: Towarzystwo Dalekomorskich Połowów
- Acquired: 1938
- Homeport: Gdynia
- Fate: Sold, 1939

United Kingdom
- Name: Force
- Owner: Adam Steam Fishing Company Ltd.
- Acquired: November 1939
- Homeport: Fleetwood
- Fate: Requisitioned, February 1940

United Kingdom
- Name: HM Trawler Force
- Acquired: 12 February 1940
- Fate: Sunk, 27 June 1941

General characteristics
- Class & type: Mersey-class naval trawler
- Tonnage: 438 GRT
- Length: 138 ft (42 m) o/a
- Beam: 23 ft (7.0 m)
- Depth: 13 ft 6 in (4.11 m)
- Propulsion: 3-cylinder triple-expansion steam engine; 1 screw
- Armament: 2 × 12 pounder guns AA

HM Trawler Force was a British Mersey-class naval trawler built for the Royal Navy in the First World War and subsequently requisitioned for service in the Second World War. She was sunk by in a German air attack in June 1941.

== Career ==
Force was built at Cochrane & Sons Shipbuilders Ltd at Selby in Yorkshire in 1917 (shipyard number 825), commissioned as the trawler James Bucham. She was an armed trawler built for the Royal Navy. She had a 3-cylinder triple expansion engine from C.D. Holmes of Hull. She was launched on 18 September 1917.

In 1922, after five years' service in the Royal Navy, she was sold to the City Steam Fishing Company Ltd of Kingston upon Hull and renamed as Stoneferry. She ran aground near Saltfleet on 19 December, 1930 and was refloated the next day. She remained with them for twelve years and, in 1934, she was sold again and renamed. The new owners were the Hudson Fishing Company Ltd of Kingston upon Hull, who renamed her as Cape Tarifa. In 1938, she was sold to the Polish company Towarzystwo Dalekomorskich Połowów of Gdynia and again renamed, as Franciszka. After a year she returned to British ownership with the Adam Steam Fishing Company Ltd of Fleetwood, Lancashire, who renamed her Force.

== World War II ==
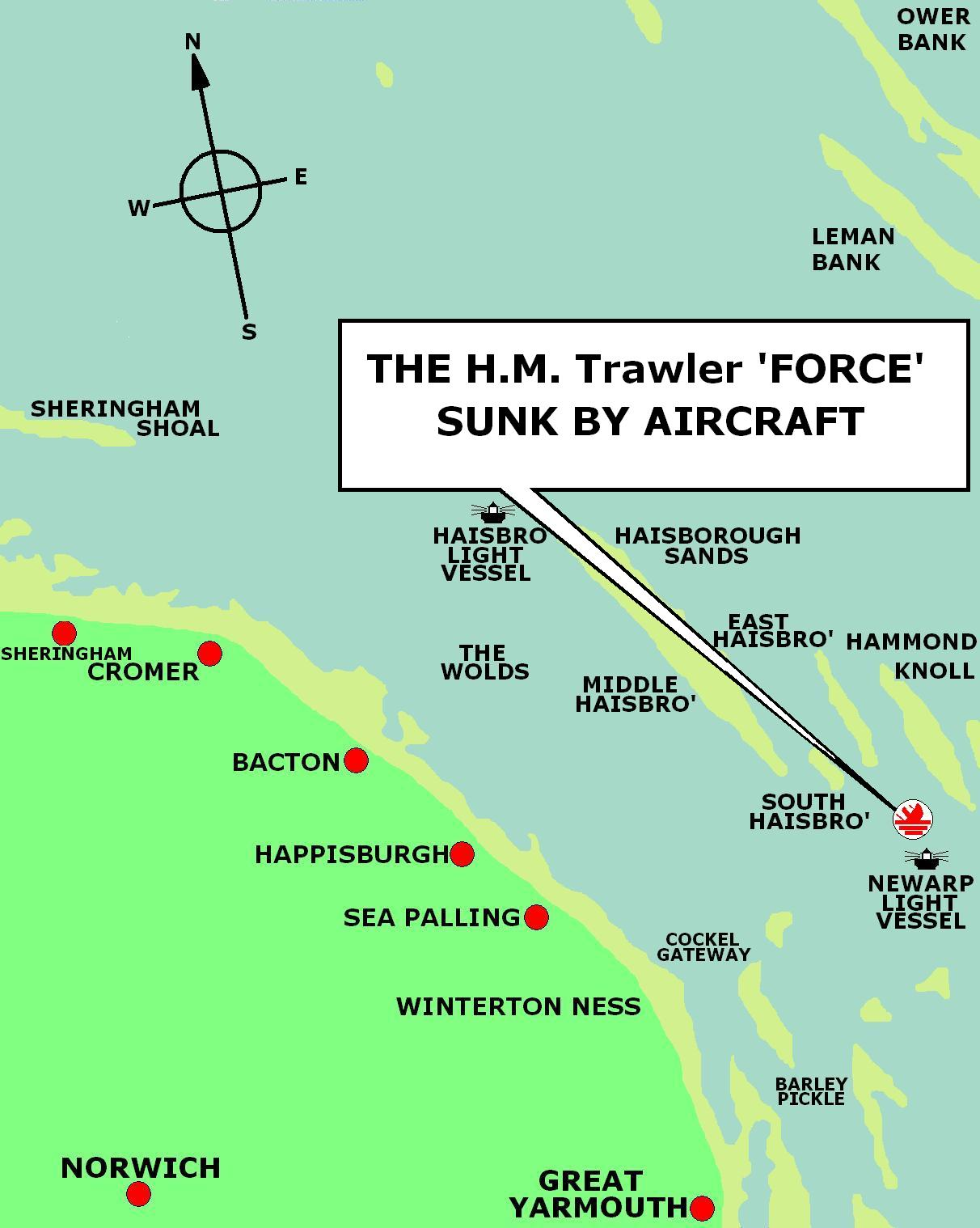
Position of the wreck of Force

In February 1940, after the outbreak of the Second World War, Force returned to the Royal Navy and was fitted with two 12-pounder 76 mm (3 in) anti-aircraft guns.

The end came for Force off the north east Norfolk coast, six miles (9.7 km) from Winterton Ness. On 27 June 1941, Force was attacked by German aircraft damaged and set on fire, sinking 20 minutes later at 52°48′55″N 001°47′48″E.
