= Leuctrides =

In Greek legendary history, the Leuctrides (αἱ Λευκτρίδες) were two maidens from the neighborhood of Leuctra, Boeotia, daughters of either Scedasus or Leuctrus (the eponym of Leuctra), to whose curse the historical disastrous defeat of the Spartan army in the Battle of Leuctra was attributed.

== Core legend ==
Legend had it that generations before the aforesaid battle, two noble maidens of Leuctra - variously named Hippo and Molpia (or Miletia), or Theano and Euxippe - were raped by Spartan ambassadors (whose names Pausanias gives as Phrurarchidas and Parthenius). Unable to bear the shame, the sisters hanged themselves. Their father demanded retribution, but received none and subsequently committed suicide over his daughters' tombs, pronouncing a curse upon Sparta. Thus shortly before the battle of Leuctra, which was to take place in the close proximity of the Leuctrides' tombs, both sides reportedly began receiving oracles and omens predicting the defeat of Sparta at the hands of the Thebans due to "wrath of the Leuctrides", to the encouragement of the Theban leaders, among whom there had previously been disagreement as to whether to join in the battle at all; Epaminondas was said to have prayed to Scedasus and his daughters for assistance.

== Plutarch's version ==
A novelized version of the legend is recorded in Plutarch's Love Stories, where Scedasus and his daughters are portrayed as a poor but hospitable family who received two Spartan guests at their home. The guests lusted for the host's daughters but at first managed to hold their desires back and proceeded to Delphi where they were directing. But on their way back they stopped at Scedasus' house again, and, as Scedasus himself was away at the moment, raped the girls and killed them, then threw their bodies down a well and left. Upon return, Scedasus discovered his daughters' bodies in the well thanks to his dog and resolved to go to Sparta and demand justice. As he stopped at Oreus, Argos for a night, he met a local man who too had suffered from a Spartan's insolence: Aristodemus of Lacedaemon, appointed governor at Oreus, had repeatedly attempted to violate the man's young son and went so far as to kidnap the youth, but the latter would not give in and Aristodemus killed him. The man told Scedasus he too had sought justice in Sparta, but in vain, and advised him to rather return home and build a tomb for the girls. Scedasus did go to Sparta nevertheless, but was ignored by the officials as well as the citizens; he then called upon the Erinyes for revenge and killed himself. The ghost of Scedasus was reported to have appeared before Pelopidas in a dream, instructing him to sacrifice at the tomb of his daughters, and telling that the Spartans were going to pay the retribution for the evil they had once done.
