= Acraepheus =

Ancient Greek mythological figure and son of Apollo

Acraepheus (Ancient Greek: Ἀκραιφεύς) was, in Greek mythology, a son of Apollo to whom the foundation of the town of Acraephnium, a Boeotian town on the lake Copais, was ascribed. In Acraephnium, Apollo was attached with the epithet Acraephius or Acraephiaeus by worshipers. Acraepheus could have been father of Ptous by Euxippe.
