= Acraephia (Boeotia) =

Town in ancient Boeotia

Coordinates: 38°27′06″N 23°13′10″E

Acraephia or Akraiphia (Ancient Greek: Ἀκραιφία), Acraephiae or Akraiphiai (Ἀκραιφίαι), Acraephium or Akraiphion (Ἀκραίφιον), Acraephnium or Akraiphnion (Ἀκραίφνιον), was a town of ancient Boeotia on the slope of Mount Ptoum (Πτῶον) and on the eastern bank of the Lake Copais, which was here called Ἀκραιφὶς λίμνη from the town.

Acraephia is said to have been founded by Athamas or Acraepheus, son of Apollo; and according to some writers it was the same as the Homeric Arne. Here the Thebans took refuge, when their city was destroyed by Alexander the Great. It contained a temple of Dionysus.

At the distance of 15 stadia from the town, on the right of the road, and upon Mt. Ptoum, was a celebrated sanctuary and oracle of Apollo Ptous. This oracle was consulted by Mardonius before the Battle of Plataea, and is said to have answered his emissary, who was a Carian, in the language of the latter. The name of the mountain was derived by some from Ptous, a son of Apollo and Euxippe, and by others from Leto having been frightened πτοέω by a boar, when she was about to bring forth in this place. Both Acraephia and the oracle belonged to Thebes. There was no temple of the Ptoan Apollo, properly so called; Plutarch mentions a tholos (θόλος), but other writers speak only of a temenos (τέμενος), ἱερόν, Χρηστήριον or μαντεῖον. According to Pausanias, the oracle ceased after the capture of Thebes by Alexander; but the sanctuary still continued to retain its celebrity, as we see from the great Acraephian inscription, which August Böckh places in the time of Marcus Aurelius and his son Commodus after 177 CE. It appears from this inscription that a festival was celebrated in honour of the Ptoan Apollo every four years.

The ruins of Acraephia are situated at a short distance to the south of the modern village of the same name. The remains of the acropolis are visible on an isolated hill, a spur of Mt. Ptoum, and at its foot on the north and west are traces of the ancient town. Here stands the church of Agios Georgios (St. George) built out of the stones of the old town, and containing many fragments of antiquity. In this church William Martin Leake discovered the great inscription alluded to above, which is in honour of one of the citizens of the place called Epaminondas. The ruins near the fountain, which is now called Perdikóbrysis, probably belong to the sanctuary of the Ptoan Apollo.
