= Book of Saint Albans =

1486 book published in England

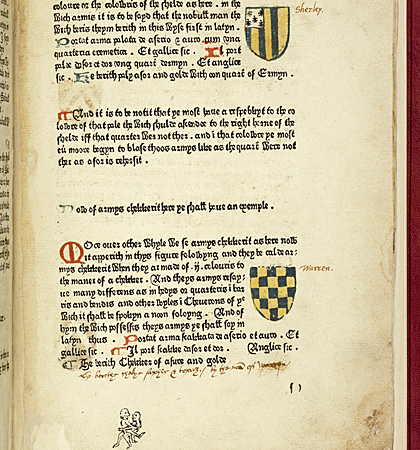
Colour printing and obscene drawing in pencil added below text; Cambridge University Library

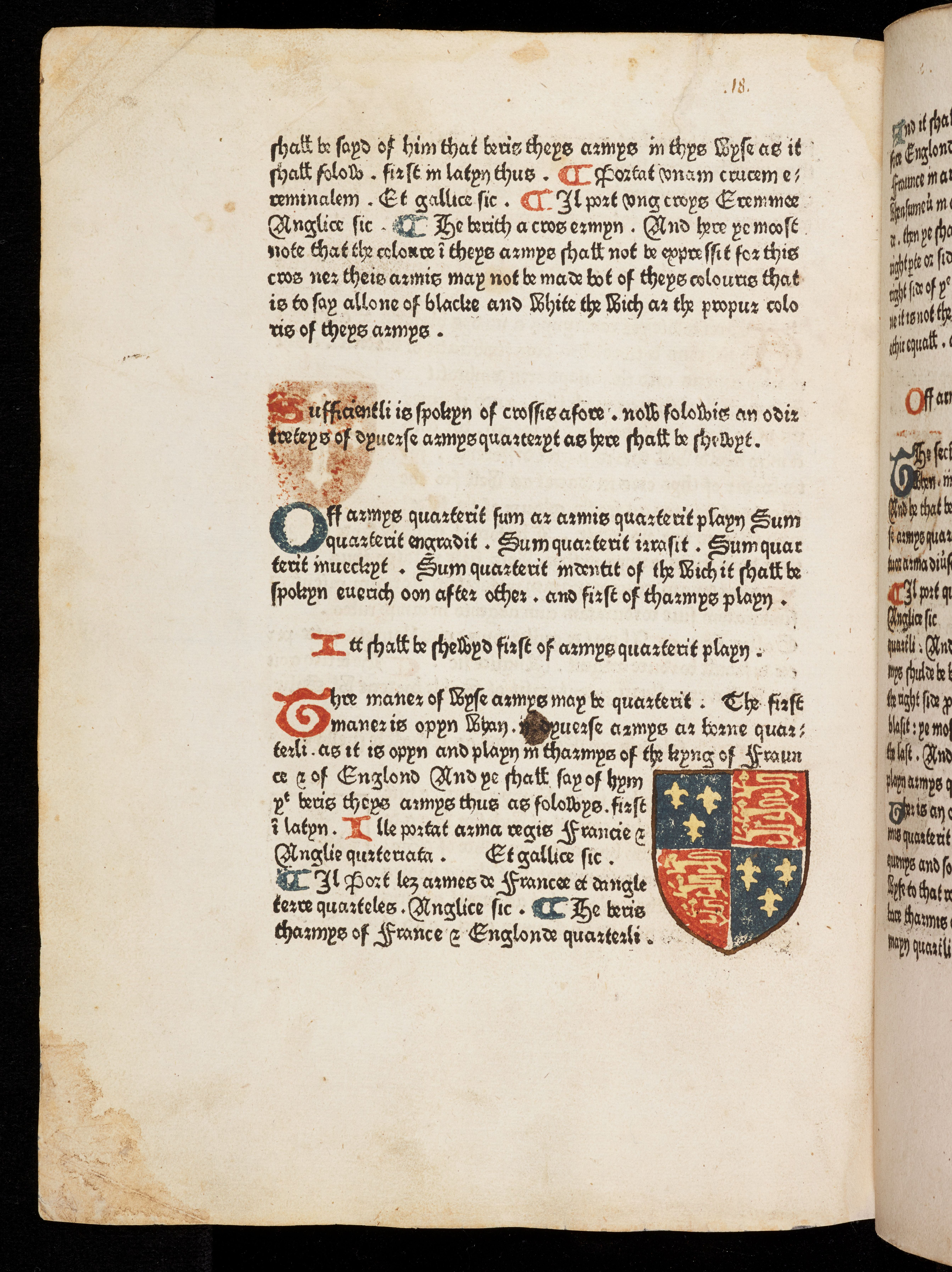
Page with the Royal Arms of England

The Book of Saint Albans, originally Boke of Seynt Albans, is the common title of a book printed in 1486 that is a compilation of matters relating to the interests of the time of a gentleman. It was the last of eight books printed by the St Albans Press in England. It is also known by titles that are more accurate, such as The Book of Hawking, Hunting, and Blasing of Arms. The printer is sometimes called the Schoolmaster Printer. This edition credits the book, or at least the part on hunting, to Juliana Berners as there is an attribution at the end of the 1486 edition reading: "Explicit Dam Julyans Barnes in her boke of huntyng".

It contains three essays, on hawking, hunting, and heraldry. It became popular, and went through many editions, quickly acquiring an additional essay on angling. The section on heraldry contains many coats-of-arms printed in six colours (including black ink and the white of the page), the first colour printing in England. During the 16th century the work was very popular, and was reprinted many times. It was edited by Gervase Markham in 1595 as The Gentleman's Academic.

Scholarship on the sources of the book indicates that little in it was original. It is expressly stated at the end of the Blasynge of Armys that the section was "translatyd and compylyt," and it is likely that the other treatises are translations, probably from the French. An older form of the treatise on fishing was edited in 1883 by Mr T. Satchell from a manuscript in possession of Alfred Denison. This treatise probably dates from about 1450, and formed the foundation of that section in the book of 1496. Only three perfect copies of the first edition are known to exist. A facsimile, entitled The Boke of St Albans, with an introduction by William Blades, appeared in 1881.

== Juliana Berners ==
Juliana Berners is mentioned in the 1486 edition, but little is known about her life. She is said to have been the Benedictine prioress of the Priory of St. Mary of Sopwell, near St Albans in Hertfordshire. She was probably born into the nobility, which would explain her level of education and her love of field sports. It is not clear how much of The Book of Saint Albans was written by Juliana Berners, but she is most commonly associated with the treatise on hunting.

Her name was changed by Wynkyn de Worde to "Dame Julyans Bernes" in his edition. There is no such person to be found in the pedigree of the Berners family, but there is a gap in the records of the priory of Sopwell between 1430 and 1480. De Worde's edition (fol. 1496), also without a title-page, begins: "This present boke shewyth the manere of hawkynge and huntynge: and also of diuysynge of Cote armours. It shewyth also a good matere belongynge to horses: wyth other comendable treatyses. And ferdermore of the blasynge of armys: as hereafter it maye appere." This edition was adorned by three woodcuts, and included a "Treatyse of fysshynge wyth an Angle", not contained in the St Albans edition.

Joseph Haslewood, who published a facsimile of Wynkyn de Worde's edition (London, 1811, folio) with a biographical and bibliographical notice, examined with the greatest care Berner's claims to authorship. He assigned to her little else in the Boke except part of the treatise on hawking and the section on hunting.

== Hawking (falconry) ==
The hawking treatise is considered to be adapted from the Booke of Hawkyng after Prince Edwarde Kyng of Englande, a manuscript of the reign of Edward IV of England (BL Harley Collection 2340). The work is not intended as a full practical treatise, but to introduce the technical language, and to describe feeding and illnesses, for an owner who wishes to take an interest.

The work provides this hierarchy of raptors and the social ranks for which each bird was supposedly appropriate.

- Emperor: eagle, vulture, merlin
- King: gyrfalcon
- Prince: gentle falcon: a female peregrine falcon
- Duke: falcon of the loch
- Earl: peregrine falcon
- Baron: buzzard
- Knight: saker falcon
- Squire: lanner falcon
- Lady: merlin
- Young man: hobby
- Yeoman: goshawk
- Poor man: male falcon
- Priest: sparrowhawk
- Holy water clerk: sparrowhawk

== Hunting ==
The essay on hunting, in particular, is attributed to Dame Juliana Berners (or Barnes or Bernes) who was believed to have been the prioress of Sopwell Priory near St Albans. It is in fact a metrical form of much older matter, going back to the reign of Edward II of England, and written in French: the Le Art de Venerie of the huntsman Guillaume Twici.

The book contains, appended, a large list of special collective nouns for animals, "Company terms", such as "gaggle of geese" and the like, as in the article List of animal names. Amongst these are numerous humorous collective nouns for different professions, such as a "diligence of messengers", a "melody of harpers", a "blast of hunters", "a subtlety of sergeants", "a gaggle of women", and a "superfluity of nuns". The tradition of a large number of such collective nouns which has survived into modern Standard English ultimately goes back to this book, via the popular 1595 edition by Gervase Markham in his The Gentleman's Academic.

== Angling ==
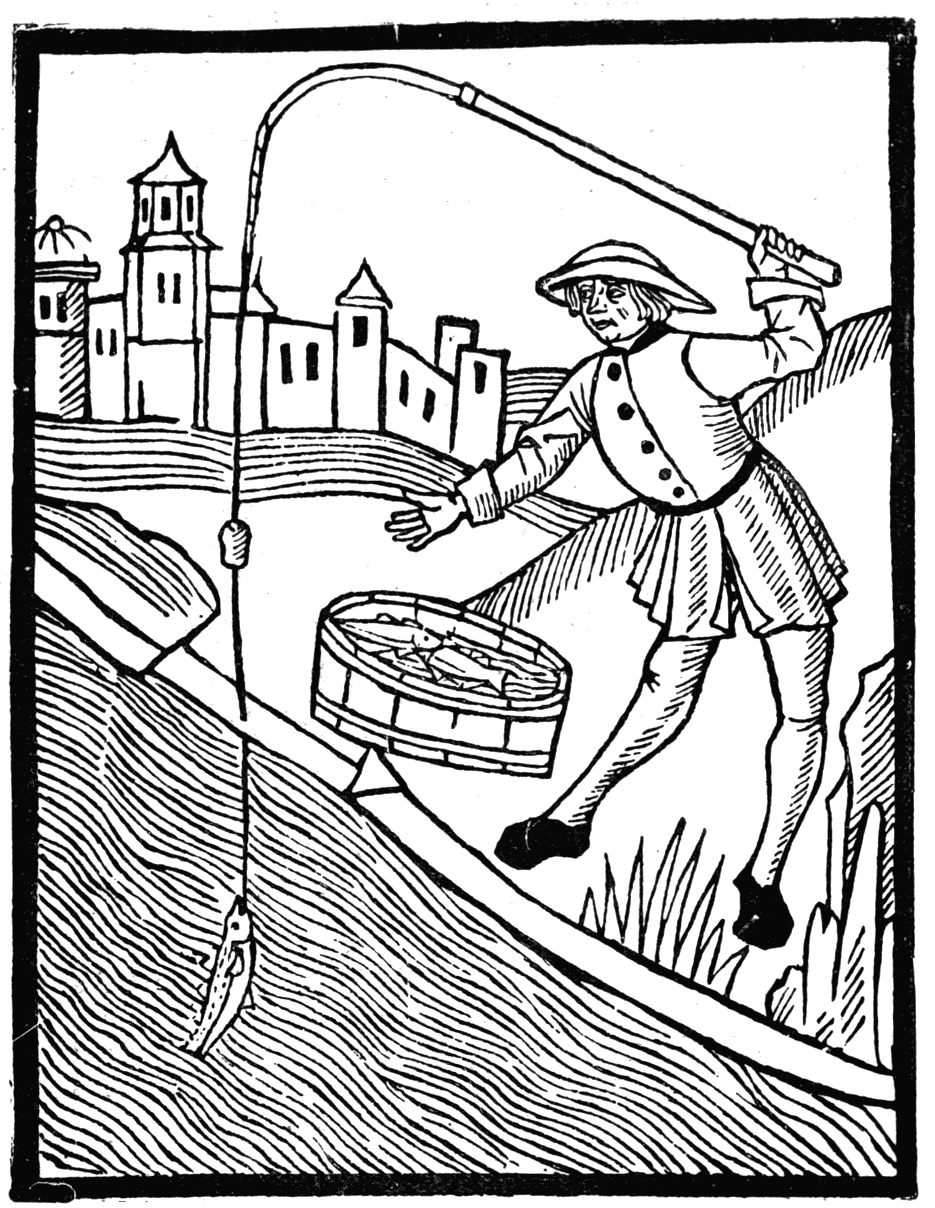
Reproduction of a woodcut from Wynkyn de Worde's edition of 1496

A work added to the 1496 edition of the book, was the Treatyse of Fysshynge with an Angle, on angling. It is an earlier collection of practical advice for fishing; and was drawn on by Isaak Walton. Among recognised sources for Walton's Compleat Angler are works of William Gryndall (1596) and Leonard Mascall (1590), both of which are close derivatives of the Treatyse.

== Heraldry ==
The virtues of the gentleman, according to the book, were skewed towards those useful in military terms. It contained a section on the law of heraldic arms, the Liber Armorum, reporting on the contemporary discussion on the relationship between gentility, and the heraldic practice of "gate-keeping" the grant of coats of arms (blazons). The book took the line that the law of arms was part of the law of nature. James Dallaway reprinted this Book of Arms in his 1793 Inquiries into the Origin and Progress of Heraldry in England.

The book proposed that there could be several kinds of gentlemen: those "of blood" differed from those granted coat armour. J. P. Cooper wrote:

The Boke's classification of gentry was to be repeated by heraldic writers for two centuries and was systematised by Ferne and Legh under Elizabeth.

He takes as sources for the assertions in the Boke the works of Nicholas Upton called De Studio Militari, and the unpublished manuscript of readings in heraldry, around 1450, known as "Richard Strangways's Book" (i.e. BL Harley Collection 2259). There are idiosyncratic ideas on the curse of Ham underpinning the theory, with Europeans being "Hamitic"; Cooper believes the source may be the Testament of Love of Thomas Usk. Jacob's suggestion of another source for the work, a Book of the Lineage of Cote Armour, does not come with direct indications of the affiliation.

== Derivative works ==
Gervase Markham edited the book as The Gentleman's Academie, or the Booke of S. Albans (1595), London (for Humfrey Lownes). This was then reprinted in 1614 as A Jewel for Gentry. According to Joseph Haslewood, this 1614 reprint was the last in the series going back to the 1486 original.

== Online versions ==
- A copy of an 1881 edition: archive.org
- Full digitised version on Cambridge Digital Library
- Various formats available at: Project Gutenberg

== See also ==
- Falconry
- A Kestrel for a Knave
- Rache
- Terms of venery
