= Juliana Berners =

English prioress and author

Dame Juliana Berners, O.S.B.
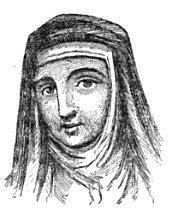
- Purported image of Dame Juliana Berners, O.S.B. (1904)
- Born: ca. 1388
- Occupations: Nun and writer
- Notable work: The Boke of Saint Albans

Juliana Berners (or Barnes or Bernes) (born 1388), was an English writer on heraldry, hawking, fishing and hunting. She is said to have been prioress of the St Mary of Sopwell, near St Albans in Hertfordshire.

== Life and work ==
Very little is known about Juliana Berners, and that which is known cannot be verified with certainty. She was the author of treatises on field sports, such as hunting, and many people credit her with the entirety of The Boke of Saint Albans. A facsimile of The Boke of Saint Albans, published in 1810 by Joseph Haslewood, contains an introduction which examines the authorship of the book and the biography of Juliana Berners. Unfortunately, this introduction is largely speculative.

Based on her last name, scholars suggest that she was either the daughter of the courtier Sir James Berners or wife to the lord of the manor of Julians Barnes. Whatever family she came from, it is likely that she was high-born and well-educated. It is generally believed that she entered the Benedictine monastic life and became the prioress of Sopwell Nunnery near St Albans. How and when she joined the nunnery is unknown.

Since she was most likely brought up at court, she no doubt hunted and fished with other fashionable court ladies. After she adopted the monastic life, she probably retained her love of hawking, hunting and fishing, and her passion for field sports, which led her to write her treatise on hunting and perhaps others. These treatises are remarkable in the fact that they are some of the earliest extant writings of their kind, as well as in their vision and insight. They include remarks on the virtues of environmental conservation and on etiquette for field sports, concepts which would not become commonly accepted for hundreds of years after the publication of these treatises.

Though so little is known about her life, and her claim to the authorship of The Boke of Saint Albans cannot be absolutely verified, numerous women's fly-fishing clubs in Europe and the United States are named after Berners. She is remembered as one of the first authors (of either sex) to write on angling.

== Works ==
=== The Boke of St. Albans ===
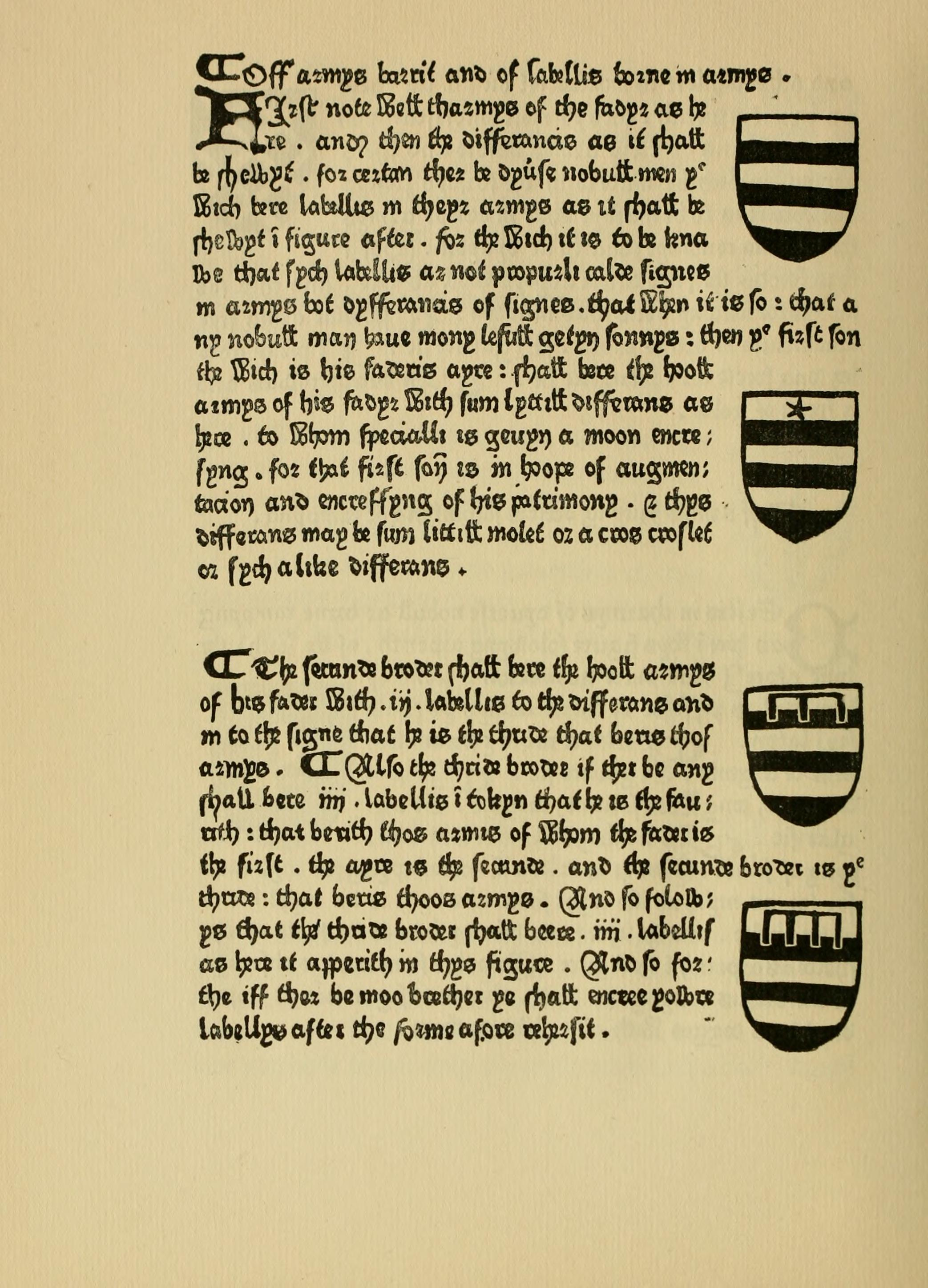
A page on heraldry from the 1881 facsimile of The Boke of St. Albans

The first and rarest edition of The Boke of Saint Albans was printed in 1486 by an unknown schoolmaster at St Albans. It has no title-page. The only clue to the authorship of the Treatise, and the only documentary evidence of her, is an attribution at the end of the original 1486 book that reads: "Explicit Dam Julyans Barnes in her boke of huntyng". Her name was changed by Wynkyn de Worde to "Dame Julyans Bernes". There is no such person to be found in the pedigree of the Berners family, but there is a gap in the records of the priory of Sopwell between 1430 and 1480. De Worde's edition (fol. 1496), also without a title page, begins:

This present boke shewyth the manere of hawkynge and huntynge: and also of diuysynge of Cote armours. It shewyth also a good matere belongynge to horses: Wyth other comendable treatyses. And ferdermore of the blasynge of armys: As hereafter it maye appere.

This edition was adorned by three woodcuts, and included a Treatyse of fysshynge wyth an Angle, not contained in the St Albans edition.

When Joseph Haslewood published a facsimile of Wynkyn de Worde's edition with a biographical and bibliographical notice, examined with the greatest care the author's claims to figure as the earliest woman author in the English language. He assigned to her little else in the Boke except part of the treatise on hawking and the section on hunting. It is stated at the end of the Blasynge of Armys that the section was "translatyd and compylyt", and it is likely that the other treatises are translations, probably from the French.

Only three perfect copies of the first edition are known to exist. A facsimile, entitled The Boke of St Albans, with an introduction by William Blades, appeared in 1881. During the 16th century the work was very popular, and was many times reprinted. It was edited by Gervase Markham in 1595 as The Gentleman's Academie.

=== Treatyse of Fysshynge wyth an Angle ===
The Treatise on Fishing, which was added to the 1496 edition printed by Wynkyn de Worde, is the earliest known English language work on fly fishing. More than 150 years later it was an influence on Izaak Walton, another English writer, when he wrote The Compleat Angler.

An older form of the treatise on fishing was edited in 1883 by T. Satchell from a manuscript in possession of Alfred Denison. This treatise probably dates from about 1450, and formed the foundation of that section in the book of 1496.
