= Joseph Haslewood =

English writer and antiquary

Joseph Haslewood (5 November 1769 – 21 September 1833) was an English writer and antiquary. He was a founder of the Roxburghe Club.

== Life ==
Haslewood was born in London, the son of Richard Haslewood and his wife Mary Dewsberry. At an early age Haslewood entered the office of his uncle, Dewberry, a solicitor in Conduit Street, afterwards became a partner, and ultimately succeeded to the business. He distinguished himself by his zeal for antiquarian studies; his editorial labours were considerable, and he collected a curious library.

Among the works that he edited were Tusser's Five Hundred Points of Good Husbandry, 1810; Juliana Berners or Barnes's Book of St. Albans, 1810; Painter's Palace of Pleasure, 1813; Antient Critical Essays upon English Poets and Poesy, 2 vols. 1811–1815; Mirror for Magistrates, 2 vols. 1815; and Drunken Barnaby's Journal, 1 vol. 1817–18, 2 vols. 1820. The 1820 edition of Barnaby's Journal contains an elaborate notice of the works of Richard Brathwait, whose claim to the authorship of the famous Itinerary Haslewood firmly established.

Haslewood supplied Egerton Brydges with occasional communications for Censura Literaria, 1807–9, and The British Bibliographer, 1810–14. He was one of the founders of the Roxburghe Club, and conducted some of the club books through the press. In 1809, he published Green-Room Gossip; or Gravity Gallinipt, and in 1824 Some Account of the Life and Publications of the late Joseph Ritson, Esq., 8 volumes. Occasionally he contributed to the Gentleman's Magazine.

He died on 21 September 1833, at Addison Road, Kensington.

== Manuscripts ==
At the sale of his library (auctioned by R. H. Evans in London on 16 December 1833 and seven following days: a copy of the catalogue is at Cambridge University Library at the shelfmark Munby.c.142(1)) Thorpe, the bookseller, bought for 40l. a collection of Haslewood's manuscript notes on the proceedings of the Roxburghe Club. This ill-written and insipid record of the club's achievements was titled Roxburghe Revels; or, An Account of the Annual Display, culinary and festivous, interspersed incidentally with matters of Moment and Merriment. Also, Brief Notices of the Press Proceedings by a few Lions of Literature, combined as the Roxburghe Club, founded 17 June 1812. Falling into unfriendly hands, the manuscript afforded material for a virulent attack on Haslewood's memory in the Athenæum, January 1834.

In 1837, James Maidment reprinted the Athenæum articles at Edinburgh, with a memoir of Haslewood, under the title Roxburghe Revels, and other Relative Papers; including Answers to the attack on the Memory of the late Joseph Haslewood, Esq., F.S.A., with Specimens of his Literary Productions, 4to (fifty copies, privately printed; uniform with the Roxburghe Club publications). A valuable collection of Proclamations formed by Haslewood is now in the library of the Duke of Buccleuch at Dalkeith; nine volumes of newspaper cuttings, prints, &c., illustrative of stage-history, are preserved in the British Museum. Haslewood was a keen collector of fugitive tracts. It was his fancy to bind several together in a volume, and affix some absurd title, as Quaffing Quavers to Quip Queristers, Tramper's Twattle, or Treasure and Tinsel, from the Tewkesbury Tank, Nutmegs for Nightingale, etc.

== Writings ==
- Ancient Critical Essays 1811
