= Sopwell Priory =

Monastery in Hertfordshire, England

Coordinates: 51.7441°N 0.3347°W

Sopwell Priory (also known as Sopwell Nunnery) was a Benedictine nunnery founded around 1140 on the site of an ancient hermitage in Sopwell, Hertfordshire, England. After the Dissolution, the priory was torn down and a Tudor manor house constructed in its place.

== History ==
=== Priory of St Mary ===
The priory was built c. 1140 by the Benedictine abbot of St Albans Abbey, Geoffrey de Gorham on the site of an old hermitage. It was founded as the Priory of St Mary of Sopwell and was a dependency of St Albans Abbey. The church was on the north side of the cloister with a chapter house and dormitory on the east side. At its height it comprised a prioress and nineteen nuns, and probably a number of servants. Many of the nuns came from well-off families. The prioress was appointed by the abbot of St. Albans. In 1247 Henry III granted a yearly stipend of 50 shillings to support a chaplain.

The priory was attacked in 1429 by the robber William Wawe and his men, who attempted to plunder the priory but were driven off by the intervention of some townsmen.

Juliana Berners, a prioress during the 15th century, is believed to be the author of the Book of St Albans published in 1486.

=== Lee Hall ===
Following the dissolution of St Albans Abbey in 1539, Sopwell Priory was bought by Sir Richard Lee, a military engineer and commander of King Henry VIII. He tore the priory down and built a house on the site which he named Lee Hall. Lee retained some features of the priory, using the nave of the priory church as a hall with a fireplace.

=== Sopwell House ===
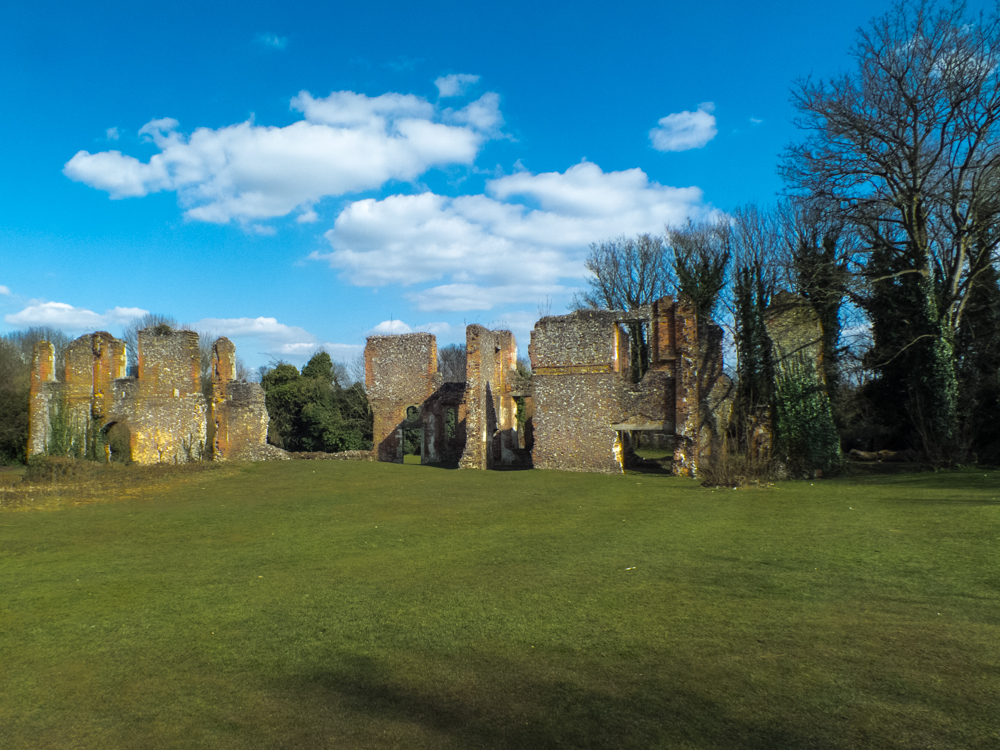
Ruins of Sopwell House

In the 1560s, Lee decided to build a larger house, named "Sopwell House", with a great hall between two perpendicular wings. The monastic cloister was turned into a courtyard. In 1669, the estate was sold to Sir Harbottle Grimston. Much of the house was pulled down, and materials reused at Gorhambury. What remained was modified to form a house which ceased to be used in the late 18th century, and became a ruin.

The ruins, which are now managed by St Albans Museums, remain today on Cottonmill Lane, near the centre of St Albans. In 2017 the ruins were tagged with graffiti. "Due to the fragile nature of the bricks, specialist teams were brought in to ensure cleaning chemicals did not cause damage."

== Images ==
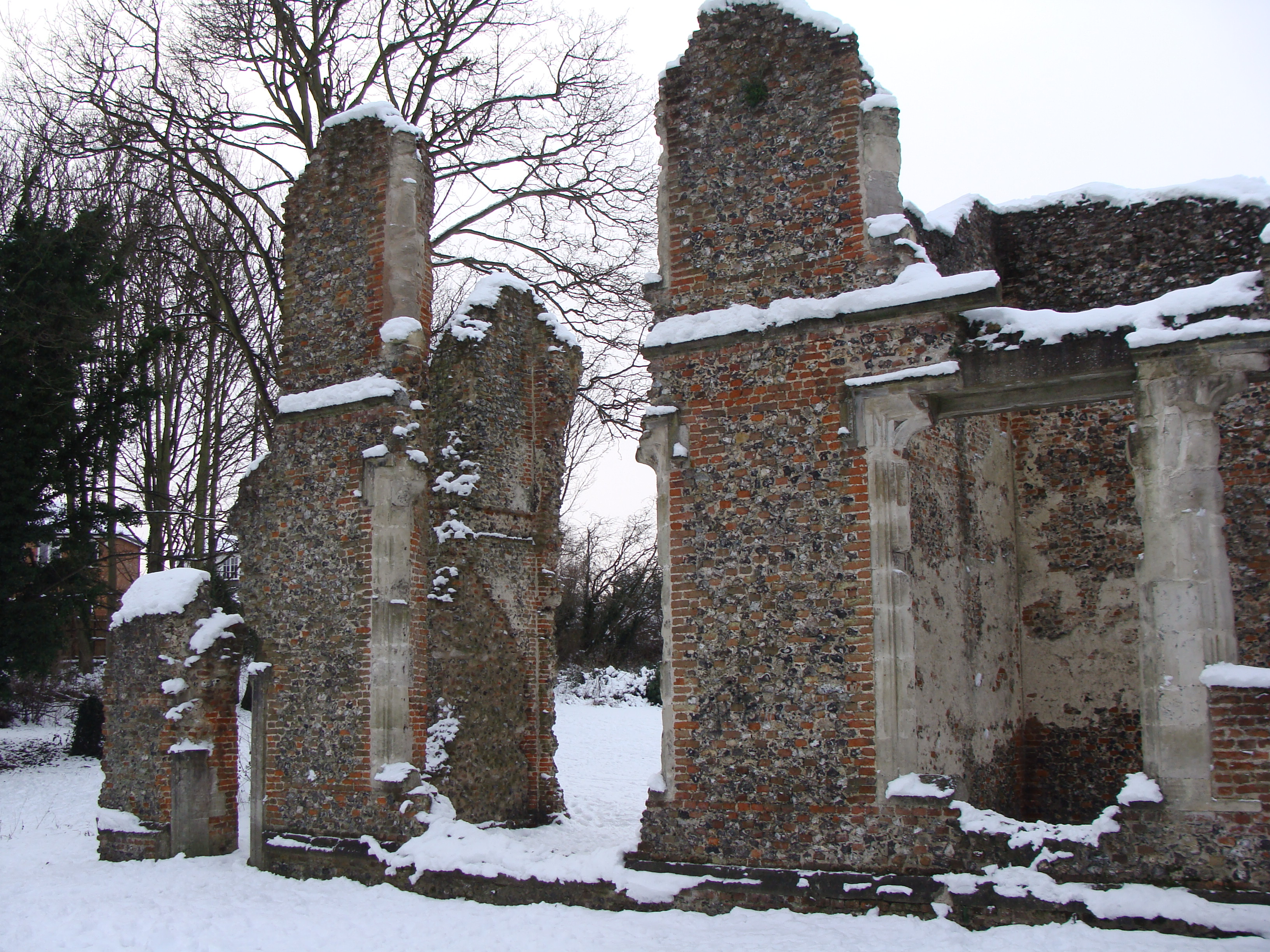

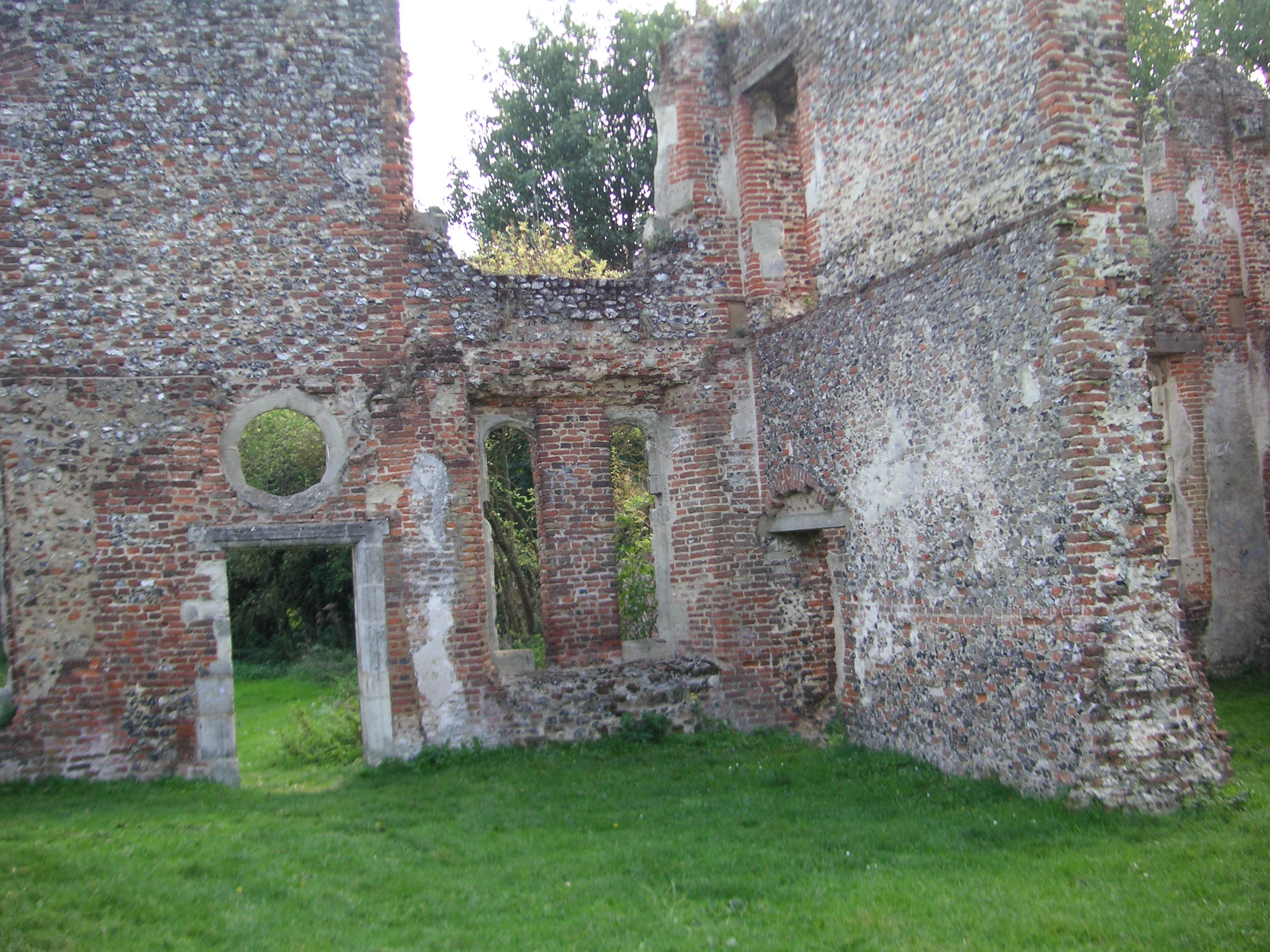

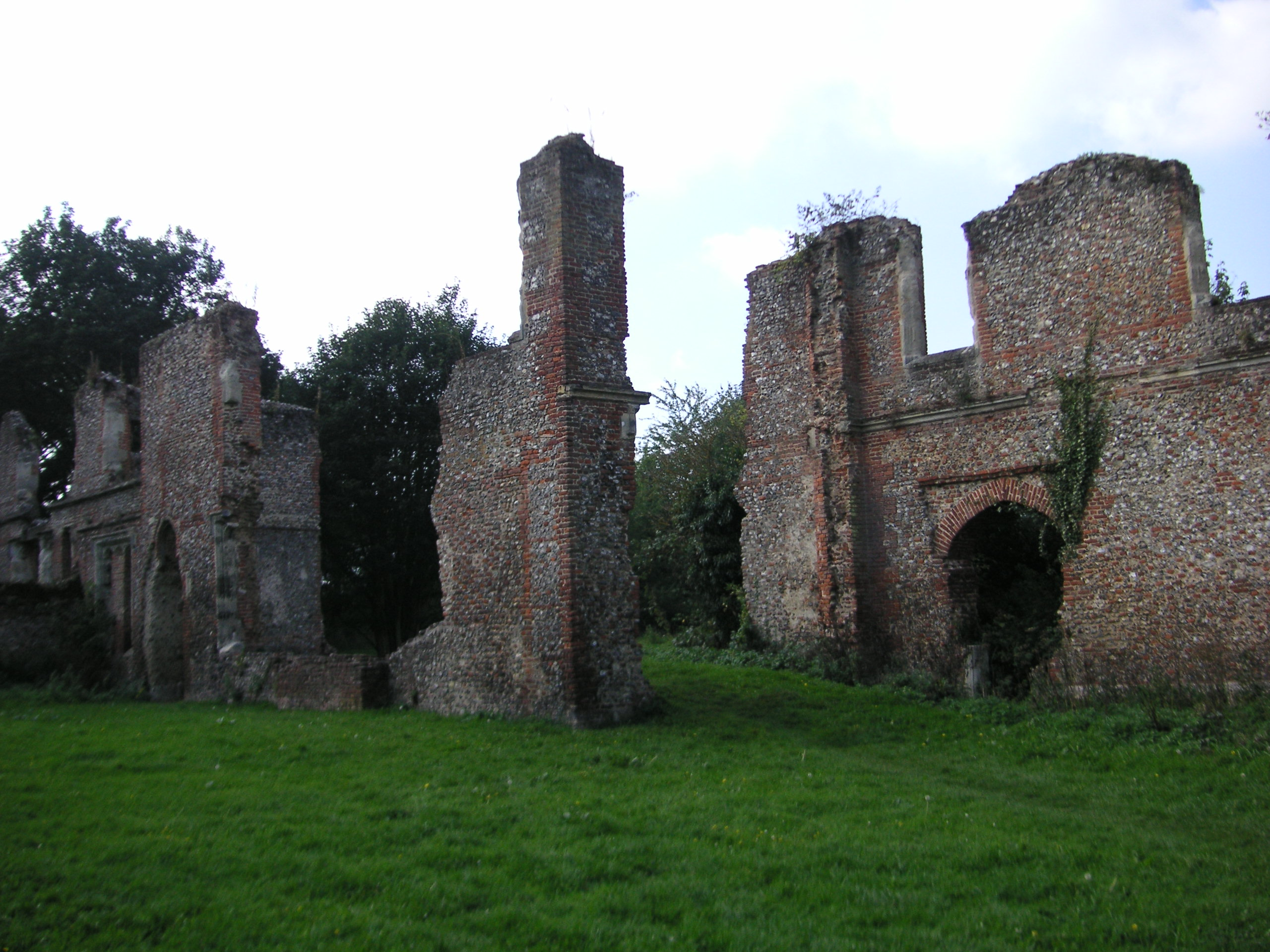

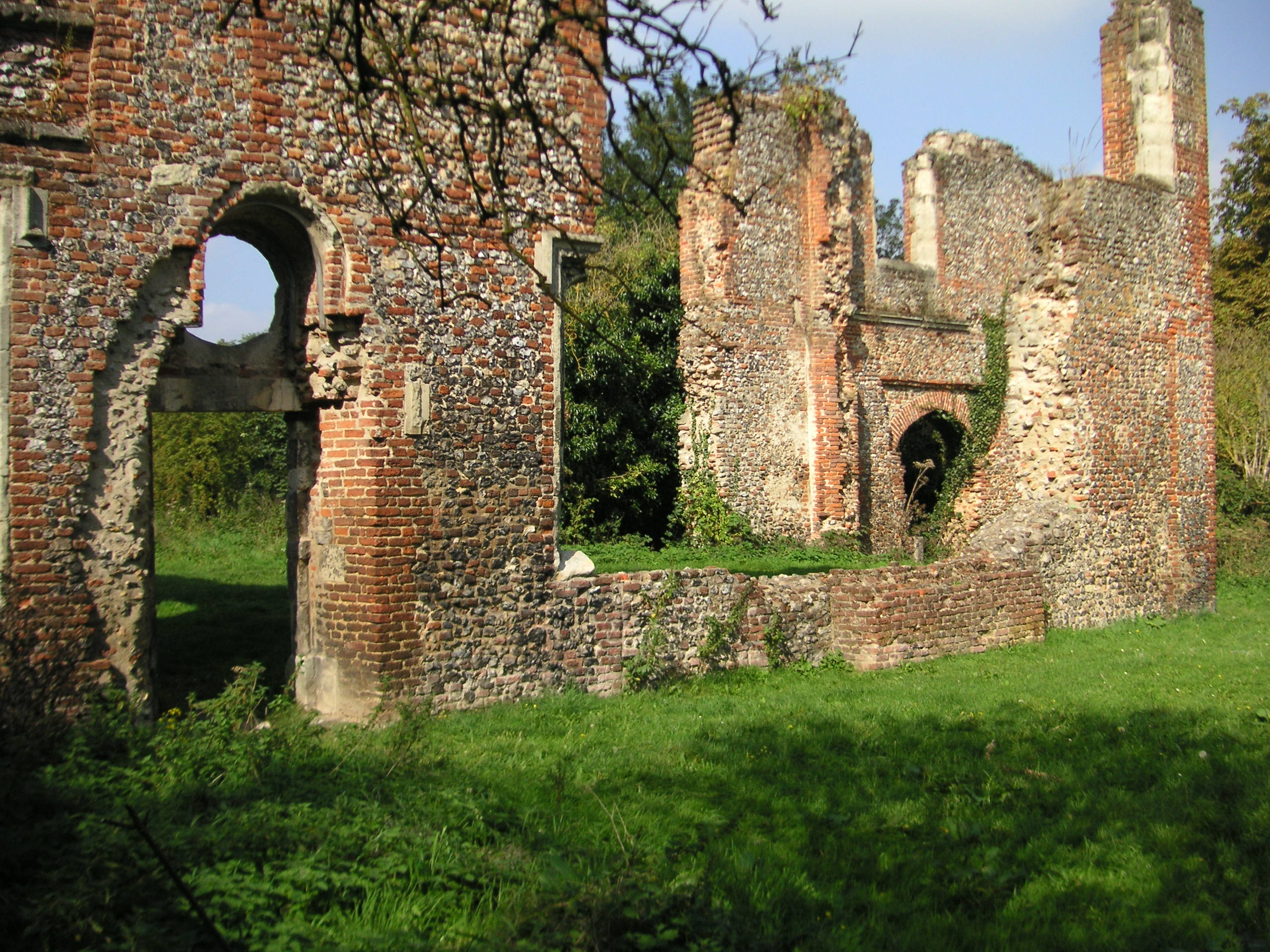

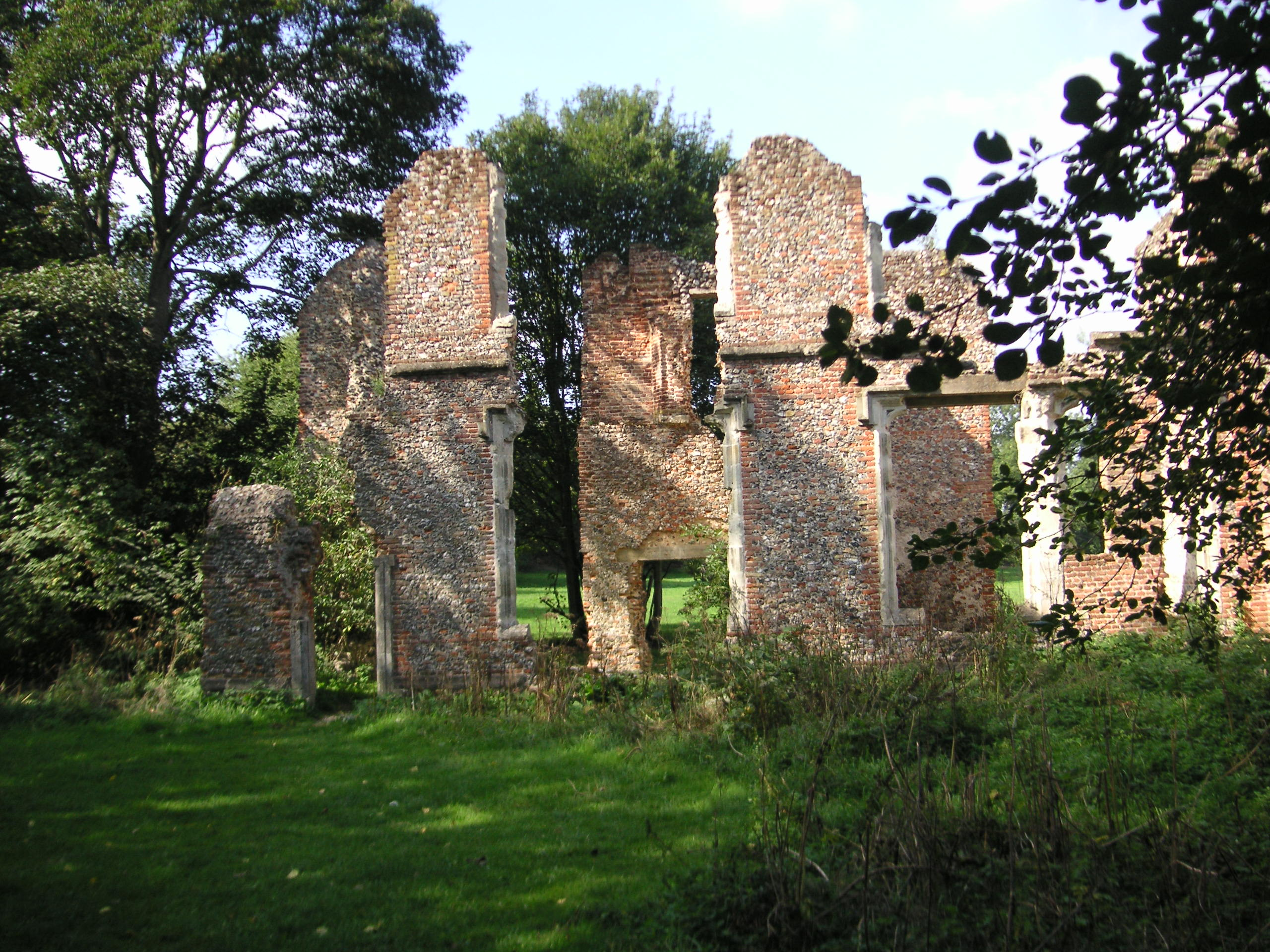

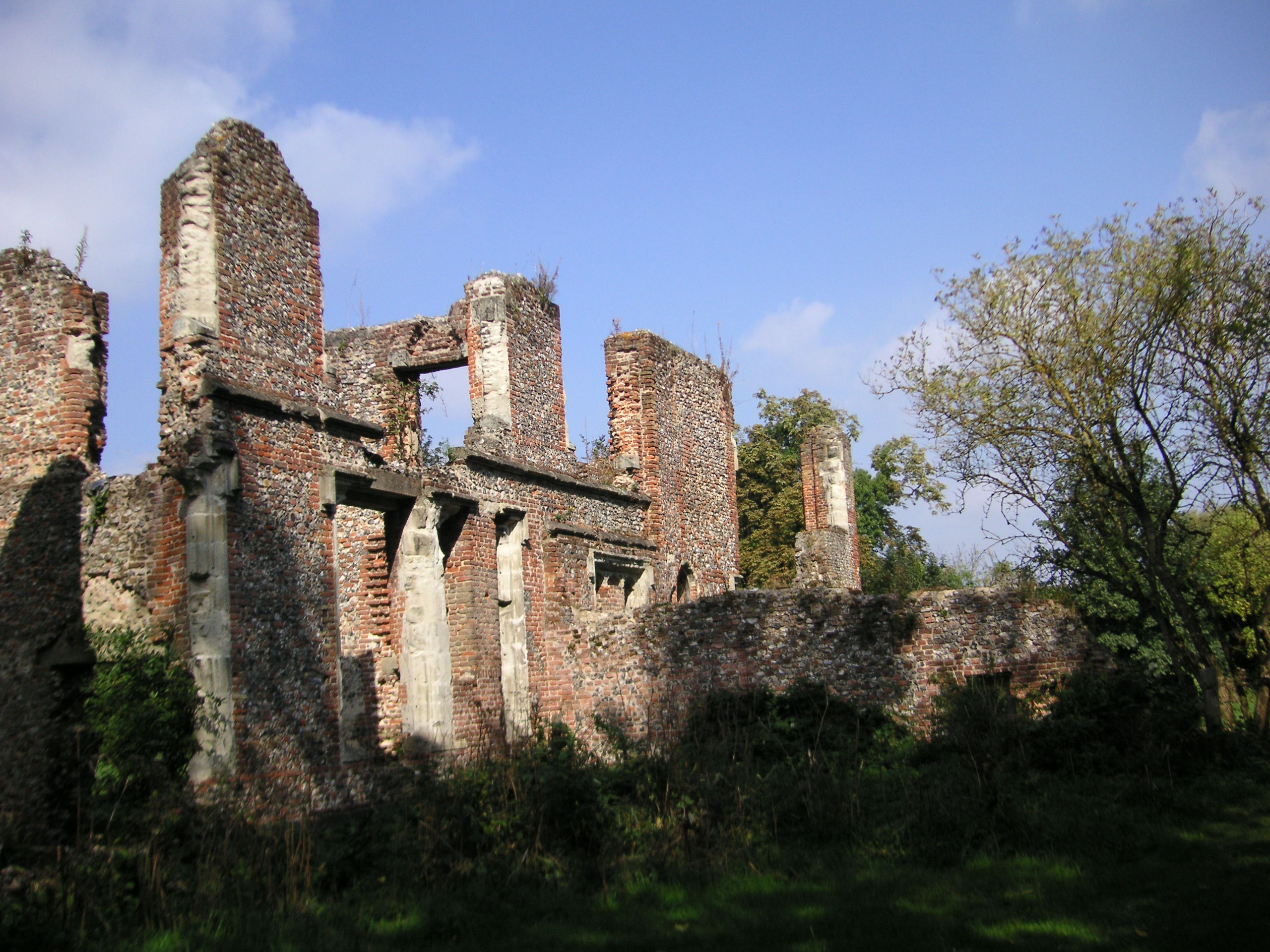

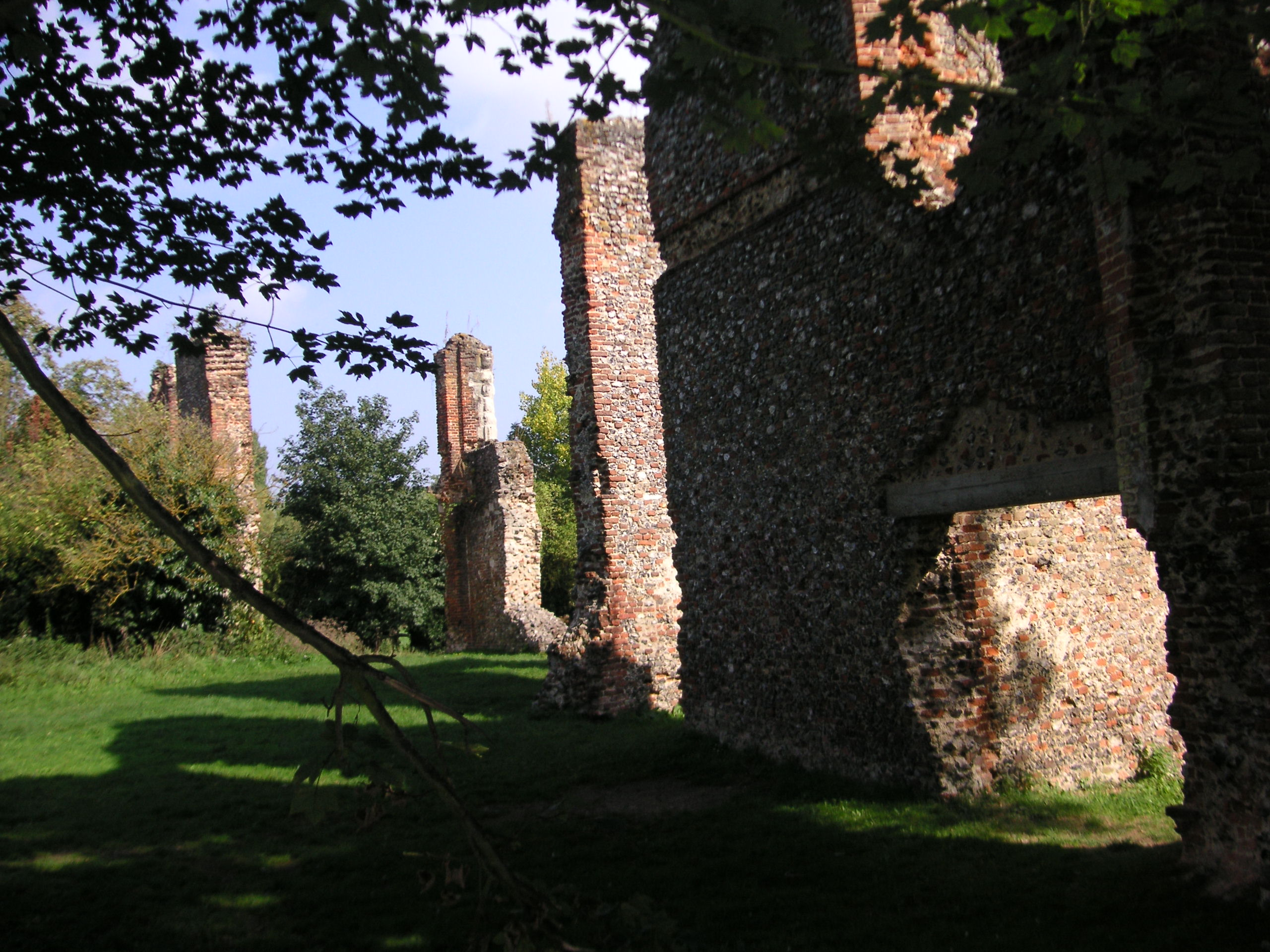

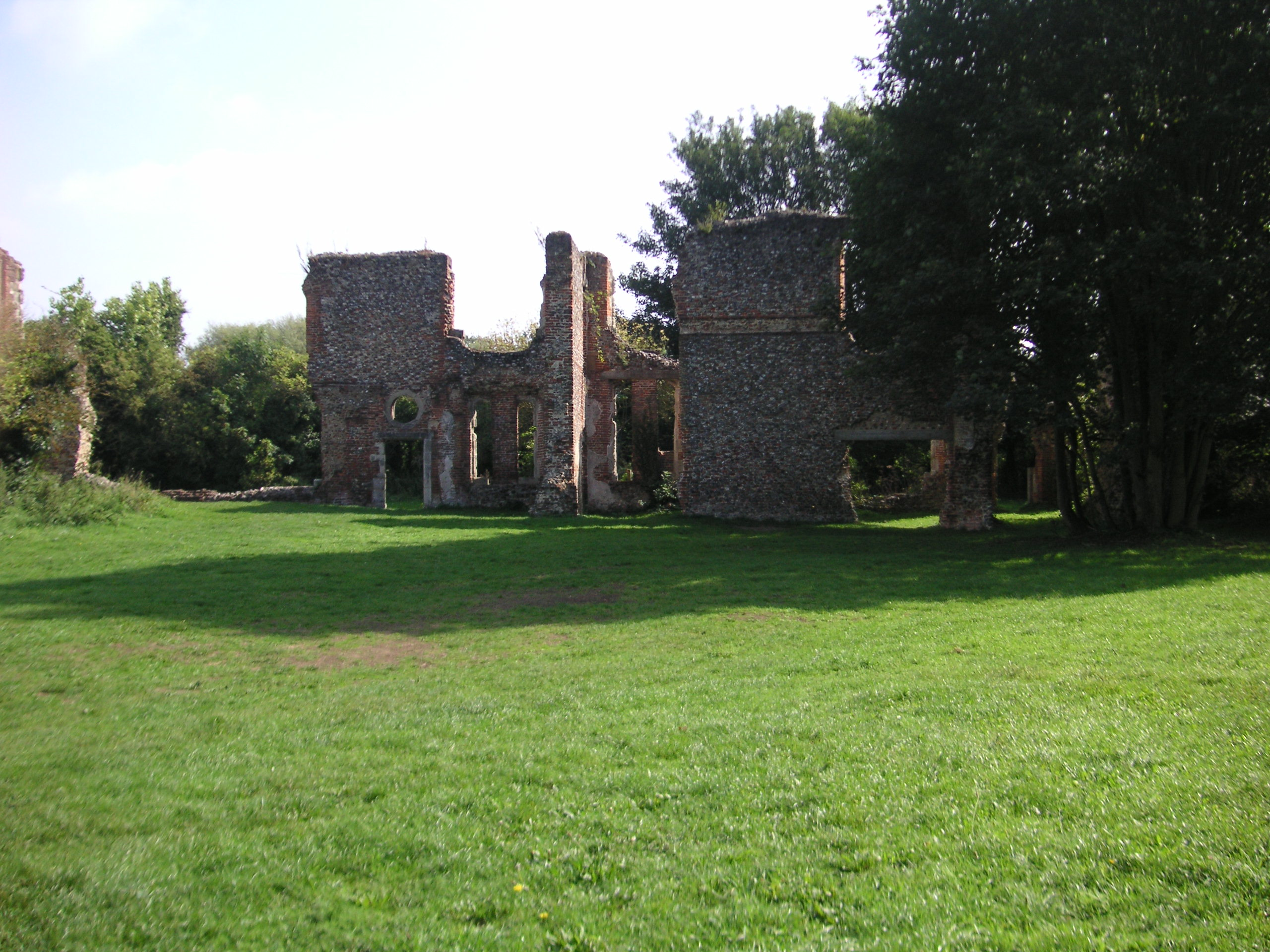
