= Leonard Mascall =

English author and translator

Leonard Mascall (died 1589) was an English author and translator.

== Life ==
His family was from Plumstead, Kent, and he became clerk of the kitchen in the household of Matthew Parker, archbishop of Canterbury.

Mascall died at Farnham Royal, Buckinghamshire, and was buried there on 10 May 1589. The claims that he introduced carp and the pippin apple to England were doubted: carp were introduced earlier, and the Maschall who introduced the pippin at Plumstead (which may have been a printing error), as Thomas Fuller says, is more plausibly an ancestor.

== Works ==
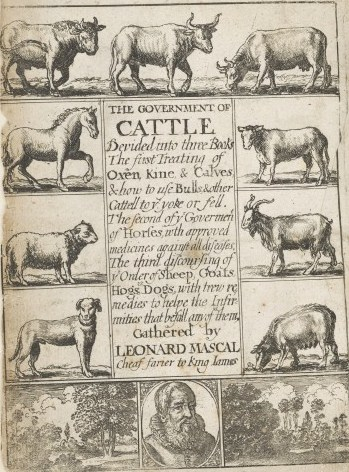
Government of Cattle, 1662 edition. The portrait of Mascall is by Richard Gaywood.

Works written by, or generally attributed to, Mascall, are:

- A Booke of the Arte and Maner Howe to Plant and Graffe All Sortes of Trees, Howe to Set Stones, and Sowe Pepines to Make Wylde Trees to Graffe on. […] With Divers Other New Practise, by One of the Abbey of Saint Vincent in Fraunce. […] With an Addition […] of Certaine Dutch Practises, Set forth and Englished by L. Mascall, blackletter, London (1569). This was a translation based on Davy Brossard, a French Benedictine, L'art et maniere de semer, et faire pepinieres des sauvageaux (1543 or earlier), with other works, including German and Dutch authors. It was dedicated to Oliver St John. Other editions appeared in 1572, 1575, 1580 (?), 1582, 1590, 1592, 1596, and 1652.
- The Husbandlye ordring and Gouernmente of Poultrie. Practised by the Learnedste, and such as haue bene knowne skilfullest in that Arte, and in our tyme, London 1581; dedicated to Katherine, wife of James Woodford, and chief clerk of the kitchen to Queen Elizabeth.
- A profitable boke declaring dyvers approoved remedies, to take out spottes and staines, in Silkes, Velvets, Linnnen [sic] and Woollen clothes. With divers colours how to die Velvets and Silkes. … Taken out of Dutche, and englished by L. M., London, 1583 and 1605.
- Prepositas his Practise, a Worke … for the better preservation of the Health of Man. Wherein are approved Medicines, Receiptes and Ointmentes. Translated out of Latin into English by L[eonard?] M[ascall?], London, 1588.
- A Booke of Fishing with Hooke & Line and of all other instruments thereunto belonging. Another of sundrie Engines and Trappes to take Polcats, Buzards, Rattes, Mice, and all other Kindes of Vermine. … Made by L. M., London, 1590; reprinted London, 1600, and again, with preface and glossary by Thomas Satchell, London, 1884.
- The First Book of Cattel: Wherein is Shewed the Gouernment of Oxen, Kine, Calues, and How to Vse Bulles and Other Cattell to the Yoake, and Fell, London, 1587, dedicated to Lord Edward Montagu; reprinted in 1596, 1600, 1605, 1620, 1633, 1662, and 1680, the latter edition being entitled The Countreyman's Jewel, or the Government of Cattel, &c.
- A booke of engines and traps to take polcats, buzardes, rattes, mice and all other kindes of vermine and beasts whatsoever, most profitable for all warriners, and such as delight in this kinde of sport and pastime, London, date unknown, reprinted in 1590.

He also drew up the Registrum parochiæ de Farnham Royal comit. Buckingh., completed 25 June 1573, in which he inserted Thomas Cromwell's injunctions concerning parish registers, and prefixed some English verses on the subject.
