= List of London venues =

This is a partial list of entertainment venues in London, England.

== Theatres ==
The majority of London's commercial "theatre land" is situated around Shaftesbury Avenue, the Strand and nearby streets in the West End. The theatres are receiving houses, and often feature transfers of major productions from the Royal National Theatre and Royal Shakespeare Company. (See the article "West End theatre", and see also Theatre companies in London).

The following list also includes the major non-commercial theatres in London, many of which are to be found beyond the West End.

=== West End theatres ===
Also see List of West End theatres for further specifications.

- Adelphi Theatre
- Aldwych Theatre
- Ambassadors Theatre
- Apollo Theatre
- Apollo Victoria Theatre
- Arts Theatre
- Cambridge Theatre
- Criterion Theatre
- Dominion Theatre
- Duchess Theatre
- Duke of York's Theatre
- Fortune Theatre
- Garrick Theatre
- Gielgud Theatre
- Gillian Lynne Theatre (formerly New London Theatre)
- Harold Pinter Theatre
- Haymarket Theatre
- Her Majesty's Theatre
- London Palladium
- Lyceum Theatre
- Lyric Theatre
- Noël Coward Theatre
- Novello Theatre
- Palace Theatre
- Phoenix Theatre
- Piccadilly Theatre
- Playhouse Theatre
- Prince Edward Theatre
- Prince of Wales Theatre
- Savoy Theatre
- Shaftesbury Theatre
- @sohoplace
- Sondheim Theatre (formerly The Queen's Theatre)
- St Martin's Theatre
- Theatre Royal, Drury Lane
- Trafalgar Studios
- Vaudeville Theatre
- Victoria Palace Theatre
- Wyndham's Theatre

=== Outside the West End ===
Many major important theatres and National venues are sited beyond the traditional West End theatre land. They include the Royal National Theatre on the South Bank; the nearby Young Vic, Old Vic and Globe Theatres; Sadler's Wells in Rosebery Avenue and Barbican Arts Centre to the east; and the Royal Court Theatre in Chelsea.

- Above the Stag Theatre - 100 (Vauxhall)
- Albany Theatre - 300 (Deptford)
- Almeida Theatre - 325 (Islington)
- Arcola Theatre - 240 (Shacklewell)
- Artsdepot, Pentland - 395, Studio - 160 (North Finchley)
- Ashcroft_Theatre at Fairfield Halls - 755 (Croydon)
- The Barbican Theatre, at the Barbican Arts Centre - 1155 (City of London)
- Barons Court Theatre - 60 (Barons Court)
- Battersea Arts Centre, Grand Hall - 500; Lower Hall - 140 (Battersea)
- Beck Theatre - 600 (Hayes, Hillingdon)
- Bloomsbury Theatre - 560 (Bloomsbury)
- Blue Elephant Theatre - 50 (Camberwell)
- The Bob Hope Theatre - 30 (Eltham)
- Bonnie_Bird_Theatre at Trinity Laban - 300 (Deptford)
- Brick Lane Music Hall - 200 (Silvertown)
- The Broadway - 340 (Barking)
- The Broadway Theatre, Main Auditorium - 800; Studio - 80 (Catford)
- Bridewell Theatre - 135 (Blackfriars)
- Bridge Theatre - 900 (South Bank)
- Brockley Jack Studio Theatre - 65 (Brockley)
- Brookside Theatre - 140 (Romford)
- Bush Theatre - 145 (Shepherd's Bush)
- Camden People's Theatre - 60 (Bloomsbury)
- Canal Cafe Theatre - 60 (Maida Vale)
- Charing Cross Theatre - 265 (Charing Cross)
- Charles Cryer Theatre - 125 (Carshalton)
- Chelsea Theatre - 110 (Chelsea)
- Churchill Theatre - 785 (Bromley)
- Cockpit Theatre - 240/180 (Marylebone)
- Compass Theatre - 160 (Ickenham)
- Courtyard Theatre, Main House Theatre - 150; Studio - 80 (Shoreditch)
- Drayton Arms Theatre - 50 (Kensington)
- Donmar Warehouse - 250 (Covent Garden)
- The Drill Hall at RADA Studios, Studio - 200; Club - 50 (Fitzrovia)
- Erith Playhouse - 195 (Erith)
- Etcetera Theatre - 40 (Camden Town)
- Finborough Theatre - 50 (Earls Court)
- Found 111 - 140 (Soho)
- Gate Theatre - 60 (Notting Hill)
- Greenwich Theatre - 420 (Greenwich)
- Hackney Empire - 1275 (Hackney)
- Hammersmith Apollo - 3630 (Hammersmith)
- Hampstead Theatre, Main Auditorium - 325max; Michael Frayn Studio - 80 (Hampstead)
- Hen and Chickens Theatre - 55 (Highbury)
- The Hope Theatre - 50 (Islington)
- Hoxton Hall - 320 (Hoxton)
- Jacksons Lane - 165 (Highgate)
- Jermyn Street Theatre - 70 (St James's)
- Kenneth More Theatre, Main Auditorium - 365; Studio - 50 (Ilford)
- King's Cross Theatre, Traverse - 995; End on - 495 (King's Cross)
- King's Head Theatre - 120 (Islington)
- Landor Theatre - 60 (Clapham)
- Leicester Square Theatre - 400 (Leicester Square)
- The Lion & Unicorn Theatre - 60 (Kentish Town)
- Little Angel Theatre - 100 (Islington)
- Lyric Theatre, Hammersmith, Main Auditorium - 550; Studio - 110 (Hammersmith)
- Menier Chocolate Factory - 180 (Southwark)
- Millfield Theatre - 360 (Edmonton)
- Network Theatre - 70/90 (Lambeth)
- New Diorama Theatre - 80 (Regent's Park Village)
- New Wimbledon Theatre, Main Auditorium - 1670; Studio - 80 (Wimbledon)
- Old Red Lion Theatre - 60 (Islington)
- Old Vic Theatre - 1070 (Lambeth)
- Open Air Theatre - 1200+ (Regent's Park)
- Open Air Theatre, Barra Hall Park - 180 (Hayes, Hillingdon)
- Orange Tree Theatre - 170 (Richmond)
- OSO Arts Centre - 74 (Barnes)
- The Other Palace (formerly St. James Theatre), Main Auditorium - 312; Studio - 120 (Victoria)
- Ovalhouse, Downstairs - 200; Upstairs - 70 (Kennington)
- The Park Theatre, Main Auditorium - 200; Studio - 90 (Finsbury Park)
- Peacock Theatre - 1000 (Holborn)
- Pentameters Theatre - 60 (Hampstead)
- The Pit at the Barbican Centre - 200 (City of London)
- Platform Theatre - 150 (King's Cross)
- The Pleasance Theatre, Main Auditorium - 260; Studio - 55 (Caledonian Road)
- Polka Theatre, Main Auditorium - 300; Studio - 70 (Wimbledon)
- Print Room, Main Auditorium - 180; Studio - 100 (Notting Hill)
- Puppet Theatre Barge - 50 (Maida Vale)
- Queen's Theatre, Hornchurch - 500 (Hornchurch)
- Queen Elizabeth Hall - 900 (South Bank)
- Questors Theatre, Judi Dench Playhouse - 355; Studio - 100 (Ealing)
- Red Hedgehog Theatre, Salon Theatre - 40 (Highgate)
- Richmond Theatre - 840 (Richmond)
- Riverside Studios, Studio 1 - 368; Studio 2 - 400; Studio 3 - 180 (Hammersmith)
- Rose Theatre, Kingston - 900 (Kingston)
- Rosemary Branch Theatre - 55 (Shoreditch)
- Royal Court Theatre, Upstairs - 380; Downstairs - 85 (Sloane Square)
- Royal National Theatre, Olivier - 1100; Lyttelton - 890; Dorfman - 400; Temporary - 225 (South Bank)
- The Roundhouse - 1700 (Chalk Farm)
- Rudolf Steiner Theatre - 220 (Westminster)
- Sadler's Wells Theatre, Main Auditorium - 1560; Lilian Baylis Studio - 200 (Islington)
- Shakespeare's Globe, Globe - 1400; Sam Wanamaker Playhouse - 340 (South Bank)
- Shaw Theatre - 445 (Somers Town)
- Shoreditch Town Hall - 500 (Shoreditch)
- Soho Theatre - 160 (Soho)
- Soho Theatre Walthamstow - 960 (Walthamstow)
- South London Theatre, Bell Theatre - 95; Prompt Corner - 60 (South Norwood)
- Southwark Playhouse, Borough, The Large - 198; The Little - 134. Elephant - 251 (Newington)
- The Space - 145 (Millwall)
- Stratford Circus, Circus 1 - 300; Circus 2 - 95 (Stratford)
- Tabard Theatre - 95 (Chiswick)
- The Place - 290 (Bloomsbury)
- The Scoop - 800 (Southwark)
- The Spread Eagle Theatre - 50 (Croydon)
- The Vaults - 1000 (Lambeth)
- Theatre503 - 65 (Battersea)
- Theatre N16 at The Bedford - 75 (Balham)
- Theatre Delicatessen, Black Box - 50; Cabaret Bar - 100 (Farringdon)
- Theatre Royal Stratford East - 460 (Stratford)
- Theatreship - 90 - 280 (Canary Wharf)
- Theatro Technis - 120 (Camden Town)
- Tricycle Theatre - 235 (Kilburn)
- Troubadour Wembley Park Theatre - 1,000/ 2,000 (Wembley)
- Underbelly Boulevard Soho, Main Auditorium - 240; Studio - 40 (Soho)
- Unicorn Theatre, Main Auditorium - 290; Studio - 100 (Southwark)
- Union Chapel - 800 (Islington)
- Union Theatre - 40 (Southwark)
- Upstairs at The Gatehouse - 120 (Highgate)
- Watermans Arts Centre - 240 (Brentford)
- White Bear Theatre - 50 (Kennington)
- Wilton's Music Hall - 300 (Shadwell)
- Yard Theatre - 110 (Hackney)
- Young Vic, Main Auditorium - 420; Maria Studio - 150; Clara Studio - 70 (Lambeth)

=== Former theatres ===
The List of English Renaissance theatres covers the period from the establishment of the first Tudor theatres, through to their suppression by parliament at the beginning of the English Civil War.

The List of Former theatres in London covers the period from the reopening of the playhouses after the English Restoration through to the 21st century. It includes music halls.

== Opera, ballet and dance ==
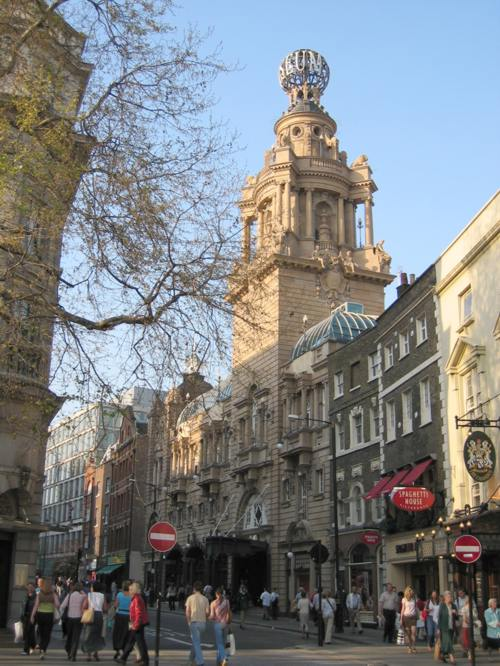
The London Coliseum

The two main opera houses are:

- Royal Opera House, Covent Garden (the home of The Royal Opera and The Royal Ballet)
- London Coliseum, Charing Cross (the home of English National Opera and English National Ballet)

Both of the above also stage ballet. Holland Park Opera stages opera at an outdoor venue in the summer. Several of the theatres listed have staged opera in the past, including the following:

- Sadler's Wells - London's main dance theatre
- Barbican Theatre - regularly hosts leading touring dance companies
- Savoy Theatre, the former home of the D'Oyly Carte Opera Company (Gilbert and Sullivan - inactive)

Experimental, contemporary and fringe opera is occasionally programmed at Riverside Studios, which also hosts the annual Tete-a-Tete The Opera Festival. The Arcola Theatre also hosts a contemporary fringe opera festival called 'Grimeborn'.

== Live music ==
- 93 Feet East (Shoreditch): Range
- 100 Club (Soho): Indie Rock/Pop
- 229 Club (Marylebone): Range
- 606 Club (Chelsea): Jazz
- Alexandra Palace (Alexandra Park): Indie Rock/Pop
- Barbican Hall, Barbican Centre (City of London): Classical/Jazz/World
- The Bedford (Balham): Range
- Betty's Coffee (Dalston): Range
- The Black Heart, Camden
- Blackheath Halls (Blackheath): Classical
- Blues Jam (Camden Town/Shoreditch): Jazz
- Brixton Academy (Brixton): Indie Rock/Pop
- The Borderline (Soho): Indie Rock/Pop
- Bush Hall (Shepherd's Bush): Rock/Pop
- Cadogan Hall (Belgravia): Classical
- Camden Underworld (Camden Town): Rock/Metal
- Cargo (Shoreditch): Dance
- Conway Hall (Holborn): Classical
- Cecil Sharp House (Primrose Hill): Folk
- Dublin Castle (Camden Town): Rock/Pop
- Dome, London (Tufnell Park): Rock/Pop/Metal/Alternative
- Electric Ballroom (Camden Town): Indie Rock/Pop
- ExCeL Exhibition Centre (Royal Docks): Events
- Fairfield Halls (Croydon): Pop/Classical
- The Garage (Islington): Indie Rock/Pop
- The Grand (Battersea): Dance
- The Grey Horse (Kingston upon Thames): Rock/Blues
- The Half Moon (Putney): Rock/Pop
- Hammersmith Apollo (Hammersmith): Pop
- Hanover Grand Theatre (Covent Garden): Disco
- The Hobgoblin (Camden Town): Pop
- Indig02 (North Greenwich): Pop
- Jazz Cafe (Camden Town): Jazz
- Kings Place (King's Cross): Classical/Jazz/Country
- KOKO (Camden Town): Indie Rock/Pop
- London Coliseum (Charing Cross): Opera
- Leicester Square Theatre / The Venue (Leicester Square): Indie Rock/Pop
- The Lexington (Pentonville): Indie Rock/Pop
- London Forum (Kentish Town): Indie Rock/Pop
- Milton Court (City of London): Classical/Jazz
- O2 Academy Islington (Islington): Indie Rock/Pop
- The O2 arena (North Greenwich): Pop
- The Ocean Music Venue (Hackney Central): Indie Rock/Pop
- Olympia, London (Kensington): Events
- Passing Clouds (Dalston): Range
- PizzaExpress Jazz Club (Soho): Jazz
- The PowerHaus Camden (formerly Dingwalls): Indie Rock/Pop
- Proud Camden (Camden Town): Range
- The Purple Turtle (Camden Town): Range
- Purcell Room (Southbank Centre): Chamber
- Queen Elizabeth Hall (Southbank Centre): Orchestral/Chamber
- Ronnie Scott's Jazz Club (Soho): Jazz
- The Roundhouse (Chalk Farm): Indie Rock/Pop
- Royal Academy of Music (Marylebone): Classical/Jazz
- Royal Albert Hall (South Kensington): Classical/Pop/Miscellaneous
- Royal College of Music (South Kensington): Classical
- Royal Festival Hall (Southbank Centre): Classical/Jazz
- Royal Opera House (Covent Garden): Opera
- Scala (King's Cross): Indie Rock/Pop
- The Shacklewell Arms (Dalston): Indie Rock/Pop
- Shepherd's Bush Empire (Shepherd's Bush): Pop
- St John's, Smith Square (Westminster): Classical
- St Luke Old Street (Old Street): Range
- T. Chances (Tottenham War Services Institute): Punk
- The Troubadour, Earl's Court
- Troxy, (Commercial Road Stepney): Range
- TwickFolk, at The Cabbage Patch, Twickenham (acoustic, folk and Americana)
- The UCL Bloomsbury (Bloomsbury): Range
- The Unicorn, Camden
- Union Chapel (Highbury): Range
- Vortex Jazz Club (Dalston): Jazz
- Wembley Arena (Wembley): Rock/Pop
- Wembley Stadium (Wembley): Rock/Pop
- The Windmill (Brixton): Range
- Wigmore Hall (Marylebone): Chamber
- WM Jazz Club (North Greenwich): Jazz
- XOYO (Old Street): Dance

== Cinema ==
There are cinemas throughout Greater London, particularly multi-screen venues, however the majority of first run and independent films are shown in cinemas around Leicester Square.

- Odeon Leicester Square
- Odeon West End
- Empire, Leicester Square
- Prince Charles Cinema
- Vue West End
- National Film Theatre
- Castle Cinema, Hackney
- Theatreship
- London IMAX
- Apollo cinemas

== Clubs ==
There are clubs throughout Greater London, with many performing on a temporary basis. The more permanent ones are listed, but there is also a group of clubs in the Shoreditch and Hoxton areas.

- Chuckle Club, a comedy club that began in 1986 and has changed venues over time
- Electric Ballroom, a performance venue located in Camden Town constructed in the 1930s
- Hippodrome, built in 1900, this building was used for most of its lifetime as a venue for revues and musical comedy; it now functions as a private (for-hire) event venue
- HeyJo Club, Mayfair based Private Members Club owned by Dave West
- Notting Hill Arts Club, a music and arts club located on Notting Hill Gate opened in 1997

== Conference venues ==
- Olympia London's Conference Centre
- Altitude 360
- London Transport Museum
- Hilton London Metropole
- Queen Elizabeth II Conference Centre
- Cavendish Conference Centre
- Mayfair Conference Centre
- ICO Conference Centre
- America Square Conference Centre
- Museum of the Order of St John
- Cavendish Venues
- London Art House
- W12 Conferences

== Former venues ==
- The 2i's Coffee Bar (1956–1970)
- Camden Palace (1982–2004) – nicknamed Cammy Pally – reverted to KOKO in 2004
- Infinity Club (2003–2005) – best known for its association with Carl Barât and The Libertines
- London Astoria (indie rock and pop, closed and demolished 2009)
- Mean Fiddler (indie rock and pop)
- Turnmills
- Windsor Castle, Maida Vale
