= Central London =

Innermost part of London, England

Coordinates: 51.5075°N 0.1275°W

OpenStreetMap of Central London

Central London is the innermost part of London, in England, spanning the City of London and several boroughs. Over time, a number of definitions have been used to define the scope of Central London for statistics, urban planning and local government. Its characteristics are understood to include a high-density built environment, high land values, an elevated daytime population and a concentration of regionally, nationally and internationally significant organisations and facilities.

Road distances to London are traditionally measured from a central point at Charing Cross (in the City of Westminster), which is marked by the statue of King Charles I at the junction of the Strand, Whitehall and Cockspur Street, just south of Trafalgar Square.

== Characteristics ==
The central area is distinguished, according to the Royal Commission, by the inclusion within its boundaries of Parliament and the Royal Palaces, the headquarters of Government, the Law Courts, the head offices of a very large number of commercial and industrial firms, as well as institutions of great influence in the intellectual life of the nation such as the British Museum, the National Gallery, the Tate Gallery, the University of London, the headquarters of the national ballet and opera, together with the headquarters of many national associations, the great professions, the trade unions, the trade associations and social service societies, as well as the Liberal Democrat Headquarters, Labour Party Headquarters and Conservative Campaign Headquarters, shopping centres and centres of entertainment which attract people from the whole of Greater London and farther afield.

In many other respects the central area differs from areas farther out in London. The rateable value of the central area is exceptionally high. Its day population is very much larger than its night population. Its traffic problems reach an intensity not encountered anywhere else in the Metropolis or in any provincial city, and the enormous office developments which have taken place recently constitute a totally new phenomenon.

== Definitions ==
=== London Plan ===
Central activities zone (CAZ) with City of London and borough boundaries in 2023

Starting in 2004, the London Plan defined a 'Central Activities Zone' policy area, which as of 2008 comprised the City of London, most of Westminster and the inner parts of Camden, Islington, Hackney, Tower Hamlets, Southwark, Lambeth, Kensington & Chelsea and Wandsworth. It is described as "a unique cluster of vitally important activities including central government offices, headquarters and embassies, the largest concentration of London's financial and business services sector and the offices of trade, professional bodies, institutions, associations, communications, publishing, advertising and the media".

For strategic planning, since 2011 there has been a Central London sub-region comprising the boroughs of Camden, Islington, Kensington and Chelsea, Lambeth, Southwark, Westminster and the City of London. From 2004 to 2008, the London Plan included a sub-region called Central London comprising Camden, Islington, Kensington and Chelsea, Lambeth, Southwark, Wandsworth and Westminster. It had a 2001 population of 1,525,000. The sub-region was replaced in 2008 with a new structure which amalgamated inner and outer boroughs together. This was altered in 2011 when a new Central London sub-region was created, now including the City of London and excluding Wandsworth.

=== 1901 Census ===
The 1901 Census defined Central London as the City of London and the metropolitan boroughs (subdivisions that existed from 1900 to 1965) of Bermondsey, Bethnal Green, Finsbury, Holborn, Shoreditch, Southwark, Stepney, St Marylebone and Westminster.

=== 1959–1963 proposals for a central London borough ===
During the Herbert Commission and the subsequent passage of the London Government Bill, three unsuccessful attempts were made to define an area that would form a central London borough. The first two were detailed in the 1959 Memorandum of Evidence of the Greater London Group of the London School of Economics.

"Scheme A" envisaged a central London borough, one of 25, consisting of the City of London, Westminster, Holborn, Finsbury and the inner parts of St Marylebone, St Pancras, Chelsea, Southwark and Lambeth. The boundary deviated from existing lines to include all central London railway stations, the Tower of London and the museums, such that it included small parts of Kensington, Shoreditch, Stepney and Bermondsey. It had an estimated population of 350,000 and occupied 7,000 acres (28 km^{2}).

"Scheme B" delineated central London, as one of 7 boroughs, including most of the City of London, the whole of Finsbury and Holborn, most of Westminster and Southwark, parts of St Pancras, St Marylebone, Paddington and a small part of Kensington. The area had an estimated population of 400,000 and occupied 8,000 acres (32 km^{2}).

During the passage of the London Government Bill an amendment was put forward to create a central borough corresponding to the definition used at the 1961 census. It consisted of the City of London, all of Westminster, Holborn and Finsbury; and the inner parts of Shoreditch, Stepney, Bermondsey, Southwark, Lambeth, Chelsea, Kensington, Paddington, St Marylebone and St Pancras. The population was estimated to be 270,000.

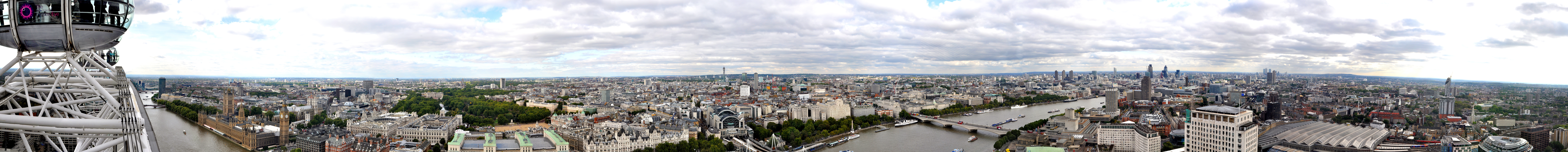
Panorama of Central London in 2009 as seen from the London Eye

== See also ==
- Inner London
- Outer London
