= UK-ASEAN Business Council =

UK-ASEAN Business Council (UKABC)
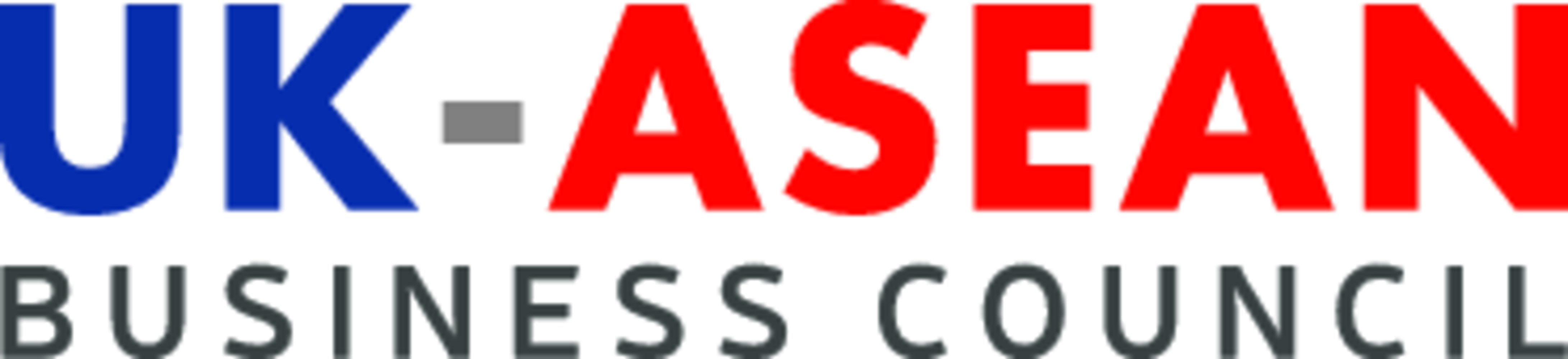
- Type: Non-profit
- Founded: 2011
- Headquarters: Millbank Tower, 21-24 Millbank, SW1P 4QP, London, United Kingdom
- Services: Information Products; Relationship Management; Client Representation; Consulting
- Website: www.ukabc.org.uk

The UK-ASEAN Business Council (UKABC) is a non-profit organisation founded in 2011. It was originally created by the UK government in order to facilitate trade and business relations between the United Kingdom and ASEAN.

The UKABC helps UK businesses looking to find out more about the opportunities in Southeast Asia, and those wanting to start doing business there. The UKABC raises awareness of the commercial opportunities in ASEAN, and provides facilitated networking opportunities with senior ASEAN commercial and political decision makers to encourage discussion and negotiation with the aim of furthering multi-national trade. They also provide structured business-to-business meetings, often with senior political and commercial decision makers.

UKABC works in partnership with the Department for International Trade (formerly UK Trade & Investment).

The UK-ASEAN Business Council is a sister organisation to the UK India Business Council and the China–Britain Business Council.

== History ==
UKABC was created out of UK Trade & Investment's strategy "Britain Open for Business", was launched by Dr Vince Cable in November 2011. In 2015, The UK-ASEAN Business council moved from within the Department for Business, Innovation & Skills into Millbank Tower, and became a private company.

As of January 2016, The UK-ASEAN Business Council had partnerships with the Department for International Trade, Benoy, HSBC, Jardines, NashTech, Pearson, Prudential, PwC, and Shell.
