= Labour Party Headquarters =

Main offices of the UK Labour Party

The Labour Party Headquarters, often referred to as Labour HQ, is the principal centre of operations and offices of the British Labour Party. The current headquarters are located in the Southworks building at 20 Rushworth Street in Southwark, London. "Labour HQ" is also used by the news media to refer to those deemed in charge of the party.

The party's main headquarters are located in Central London, within two miles of the Houses of Parliament, as are the Liberal Democrat Headquarters and the Conservative Campaign Headquarters (formerly known as Conservative Central Office). Scottish Labour has its own headquarters, which is currently located at Donald Dewar House in Glasgow.

== Locations (1900–present) ==
=== 1900–1920s: Victoria Mansion ===
Following the establishment of the Labour Party in the Congregational Memorial Hall on Farringdon Street, staff of the party operated from offices in Victoria Mansion, Victoria Street for a number of years.

=== 1920s–1928: 33 Eccleston Square ===
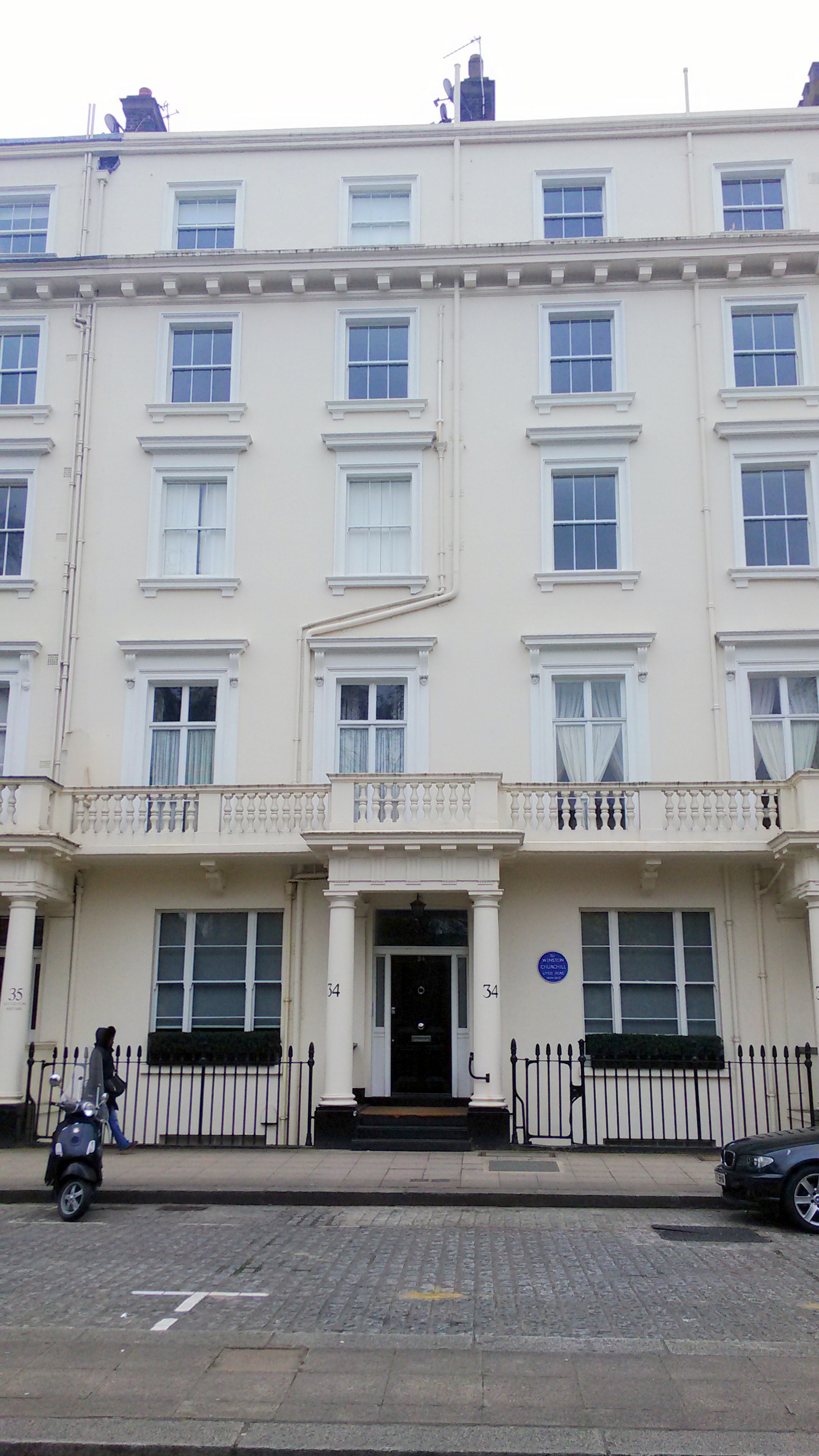
33 Eccleston Square; Labour's 1920s HQ and Churchill's former home

Under leader Ramsay MacDonald, Labour worked from 33 Eccleston Square, in the Victoria area of London. 33 Eccleston Square had previously been the London home of future wartime Prime Minister Winston Churchill.

=== 1928–1980: Transport House, 18 Smith Square ===
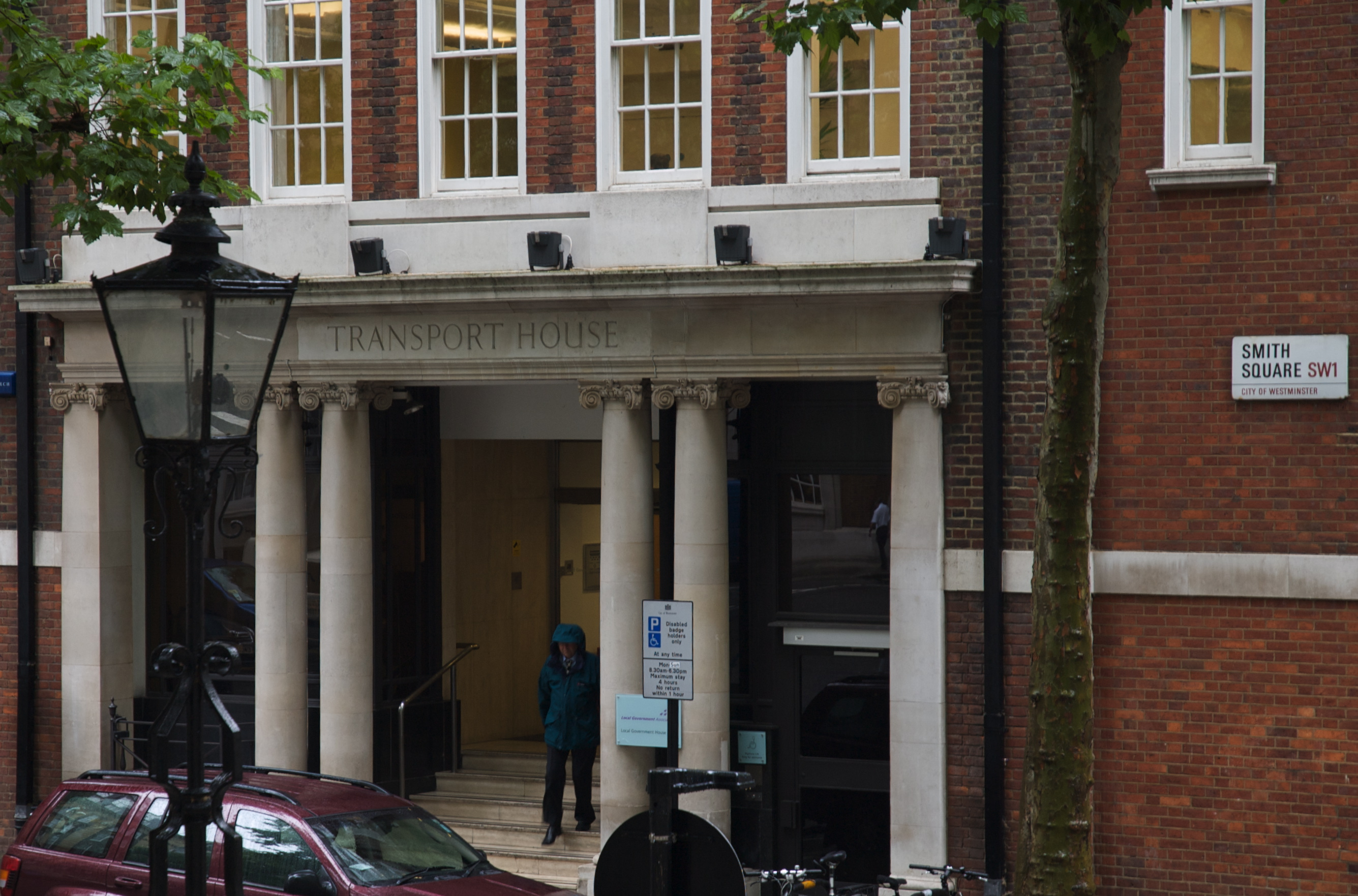
Transport House, used for 50 years from 1928

MacDonald launched an appeal in 1928 to finance the Labour headquarters to move to Transport House at 18 Smith Square, Westminster, which was the headquarters of the Transport and General Workers' Union (TGWU). The location was opposite the then-named Conservative Central Office.

The TGWU stated that it wanted Transport House back after fifty years of Labour Party occupying the offices, causing Labour to move.

=== 1980–1997: 144-152 Walworth Road ===
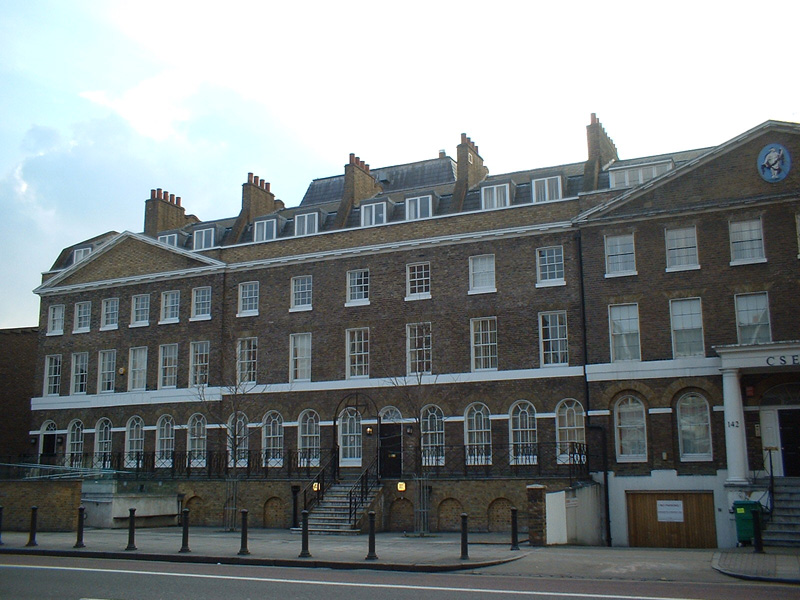
The Walworth Road building used from 1980 to 1997, now known as John Smith House

In 1980, James Callaghan opened the Labour Party offices, which were located on 144-152 Walworth Road in Elephant and Castle, Southwark, costing £1.6 million. It was described at the time as "glittering with chandeliers ... as smart as any gentrified house in Islington." In 1994, the building was renamed John Smith House in memory of former Labour leader John Smith who had died in May that year. The party left the premises in 1997 and it later became a Safestay hotel.

=== 1997–2002: Millbank Tower, 21–24 Millbank ===
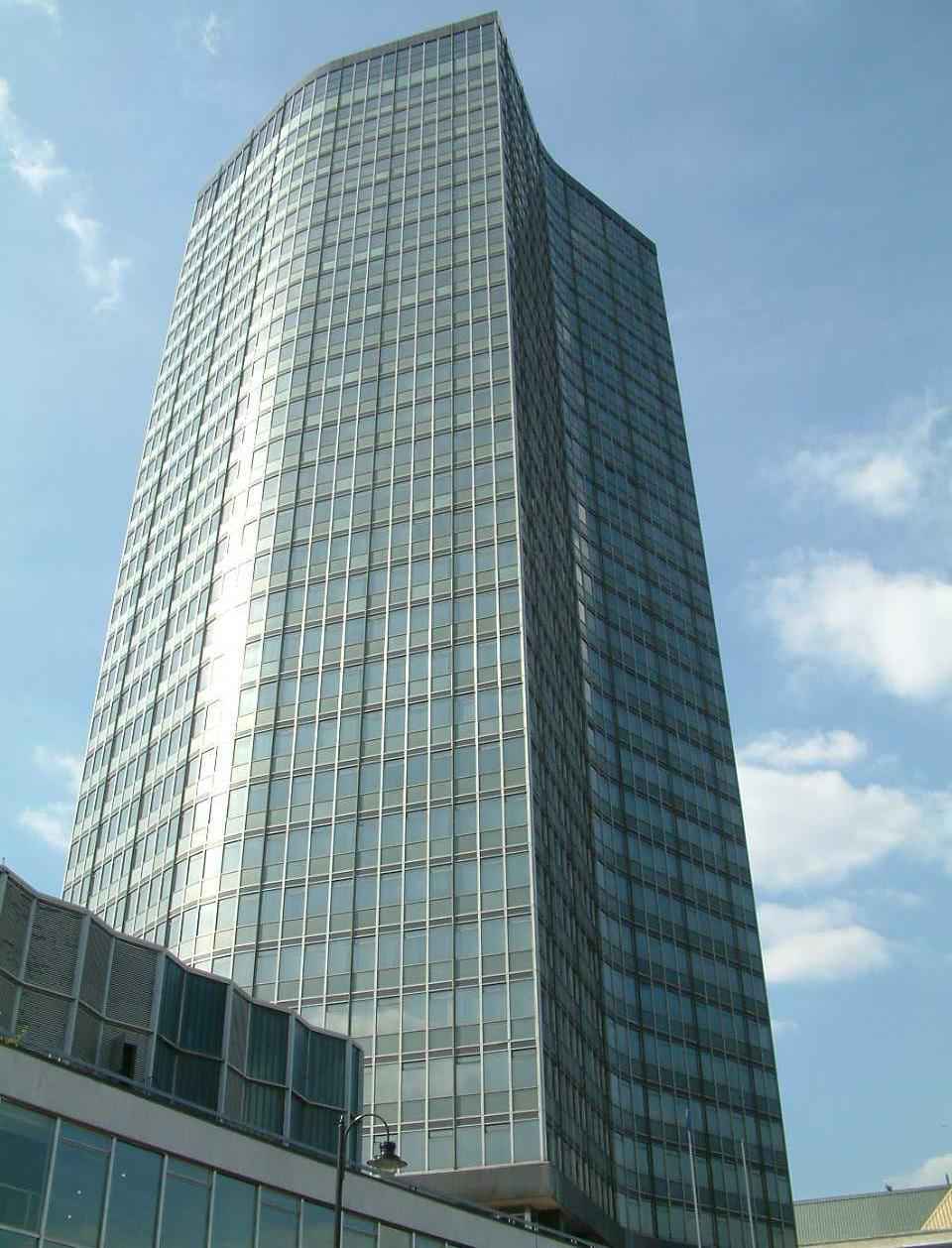
Millbank Tower, the Labour HQ from 1997 to 2002

The Labour offices were moved to Millbank Tower in the City of Westminster in early 1996, where New Labour planned its victory for the 1997 general election. Labour had taken out a seven-year lease of the premises in 1995. Labour MP Tony Benn had been born and grew up in a Victorian house on the same site, then known as at 40 Millbank, which was bombed during World War II.

In July 2001, Labour Party chiefs announced Labour would move from the premises due to an "unfavourable" rent rise, which had risen from £780,000 a year to £900,000. The building later housed offices belonging to the Conservative Party.

=== 2002–2006: 16-18 Old Queen Street and North Shields ===
On 19 March 2002, Labour unveiled that its new headquarters would be located at a 11,200-square-foot (1,040 m^{2}) open plan premises at 16-18 Old Queen Street, Westminster, which overlooked St James' Park, and that officials would move there in the summer before party conference season began. Labour took out a £5.5m mortgage for the property, which would cost £400,000 a year. It ran in tandem with another office in North Shields, Tyneside, to which half of the staff who worked at Millbank, particularly those involved in phone canvassing and research, were relocated.

Labour vacated the building in 2005 and planned to sell it in 2006, in an attempt to ease the party's large debt at the time.

=== 2006–2012: 39 Victoria Street ===
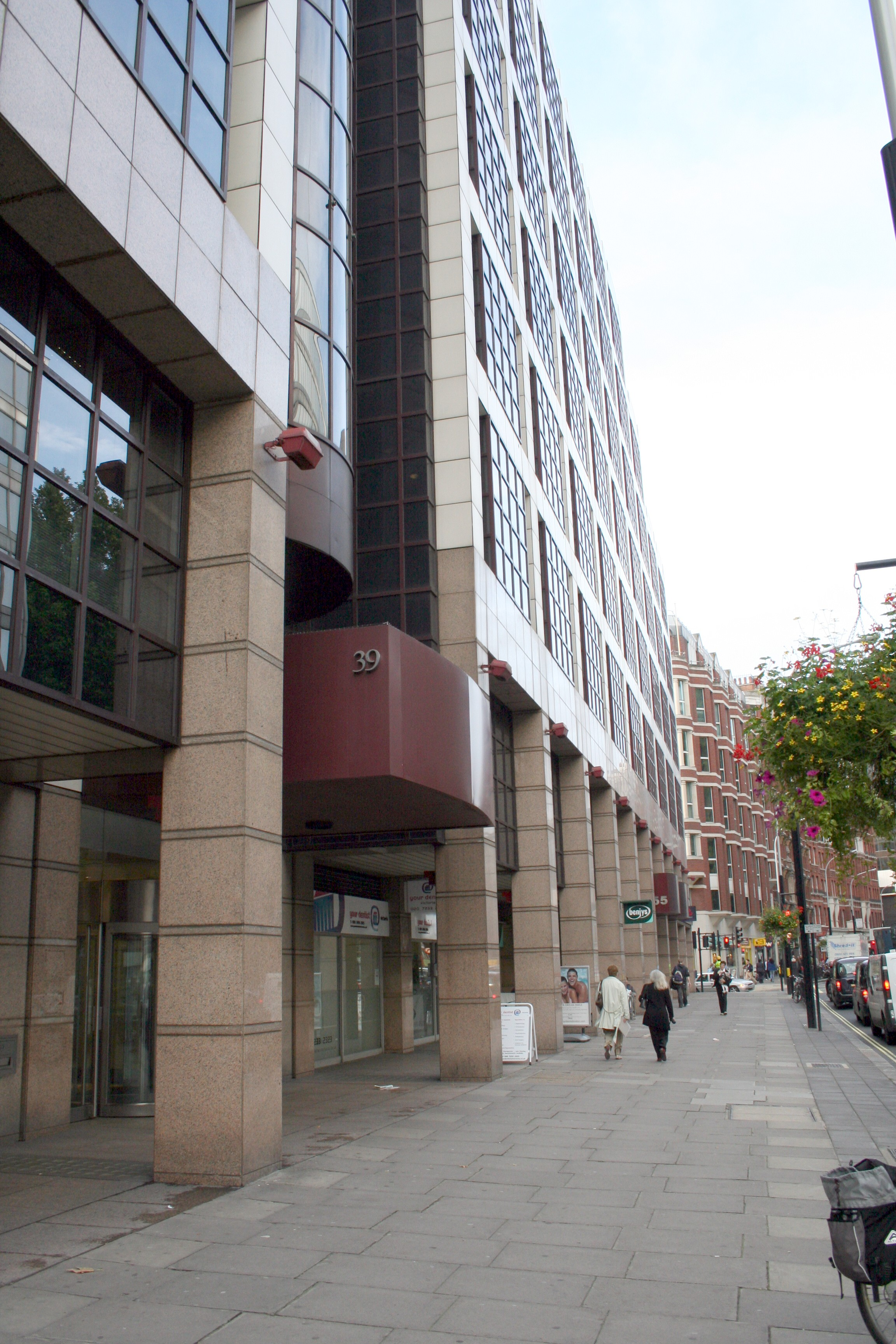
39 Victoria Street, the Labour HQ from 2006 to 2012

In May 2006, Labour moved its headquarters from Old Queen Street to 39 Victoria Street, where it remained until May 2012. It was situated just a few doors away from the Conservative Party's own relocated headquarters.

=== 2012–2015: 1 Brewer’s Green ===
In April 2012, Labour began moving to its new headquarters at 1 Brewer's Green, Westminster. In June 2014, the party was accused by Guido Fawkes of having "homeless spikes" outside the premises; Labour stated that it was a tenant of the building, and that it had no responsibility for features installed outside the building.

=== 2015–2023: Southside, 105 Victoria Street ===
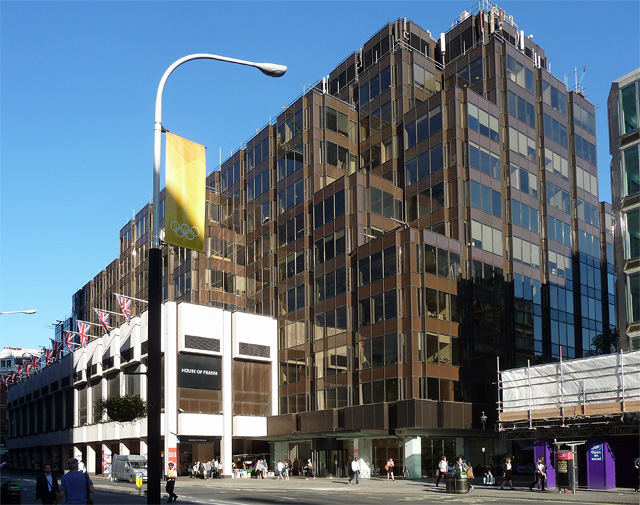
105 Victoria Street, Labour HQ from 2015 to 2023 (former Army & Navy store)

In 2015, CoStar News reported in December 2015 that Labour was planning to move into Southside, 105 Victoria Street, with the postcode SW1E 6QT, on a seven-year lease. The office space took up 7,600 square feet on the eighth floor of the building, and the quoting rent was £72.50 per square foot, higher than the average rent of £52.91 per square foot paid in the area over the past year.

=== January–November 2023: Friars House, 160 Blackfriars Road ===
Labour HQ relocated to 160 Blackfriars Road, Southwark in January 2023, also known as Friars House, returning to the borough after 26 years. It was a tenant in the building, which was occupied by several organisations, including Pret a Manger, Sainsbury's Local and Costa Coffee. The climate protest group Extinction Rebellion staged a protest outside the building in September 2023, pouring fake oil on its steps and setting off smoke grenades.

=== November 2023–present: Southworks building, 20 Rushworth Street ===
In November 2023, following the Labour Party Conference, Labour moved its offices to the Southworks building at 20 Rushworth Street, Southwark, which was 125 yards from the previous Blackfriars Road premises. The premises were located a 30-minute walk away from Parliament. A party source stated that the building would act as a longer-term home for 10 to 15 years.

The headquarters were the focus of a protest by pro-Palestinian activists in October of that year following an interview in which Labour leader Keir Starmer had suggested that Israel had “the right” to withhold energy and water from the Gaza Strip. In January 2024, Politico reported that Starmer was choosing to work from the new offices rather than in the Palace of Westminster, spending at least 2 days a week at the headquarters. Another protest concerning the Gaza war, as well as the development of new oil and gas, took place at the building on 8 April 2024 when protest group Youth Demand sprayed red paint onto it. They stated that "Labour has blood on their hands,” and that “they are complicit in the murder of Palestinians, and millions of people around the world, as they continue to drive genocide." 12 people were arrested in connection with the protest.

== See also ==
- Conservative Campaign Headquarters
- Liberal Democrat Headquarters
