= Sharon Bamford =

British businesswoman

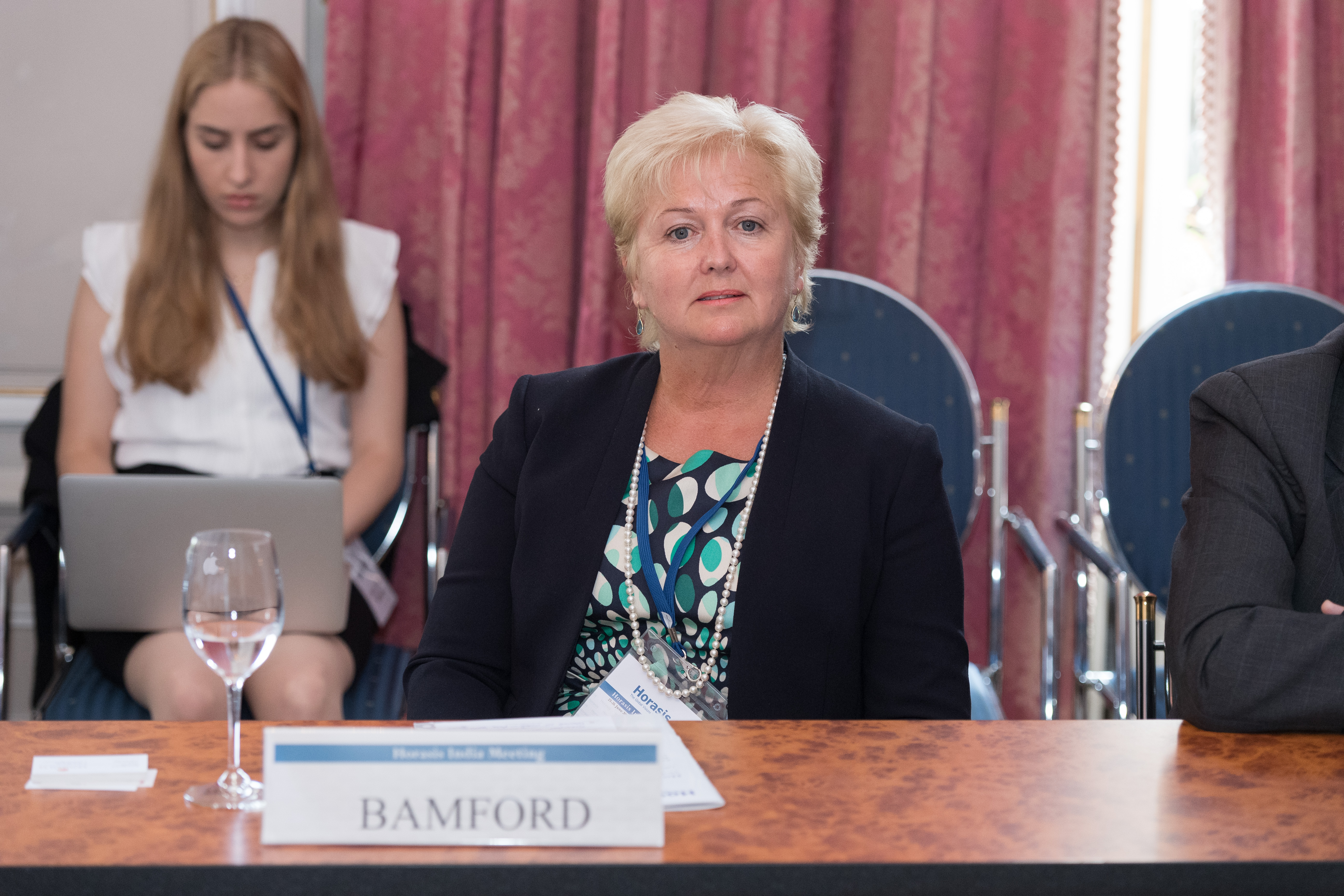
- Bamford at the Horasis India Meeting in 2017
- Born: Tanzania
- Education: MBA., Robert Gordon University
- Known for: former Chief Executive of the UK India Business Council; CEO of Scottish Institute for Enterprise
- Spouse: Tony
- Children: 3

Sharon Bamford is the former Chief Executive of the UK India Business Council, former Chief Executive of the Scottish Institute for Enterprise and past Chief Executive of the Association of MBAs. Her former positions also include Director of the Edinburgh Technopole, the University of Edinburgh's flagship science park.

== Early life ==
Bamford was born in Tanzania and grew up in Tanga, as her father worked for Unilever. She would later move to Kenya and Corby during the 1960s before heading to Welsh for university. After graduation, she taught English in Nigeria at a training college.

== Career ==
After a few stints of volunteer efforts, Bamford accepted a position with a language training company in Jakarta, Indonesia, where she eventually became their marketing director. Her husband Tony, however, soon accepted a job in Aberdeen, and she followed him back to Scotland. While there, Bamford developed and managed five start-up businesses and set up a charity called "Challenges Worldwide". In 2001, she took over the development of Edinburgh Technopole, a science and technology park in partnership with Grosvenor Development.

Bamford lectured about entrepreneurship at Robert Gordon University and was the director of the University of Edinburgh's flagship 100m science park development. In 2003, she accepted a position as director of the Scottish Institute for Enterprise (SIE), taking over from Carl Togneri. After being replaced as CEO, Bamford became the chief executive of the UK-India Business Council (UKIBC), which was founded by the UK government to strengthen business and investment ties with India. The year after the UKIBC launch, Bamford was nominated for the 2008 First Women Awards.
