= Transport House =

Former trades union and political party headquarters

Coordinates: 51.4956°N 0.1268°W

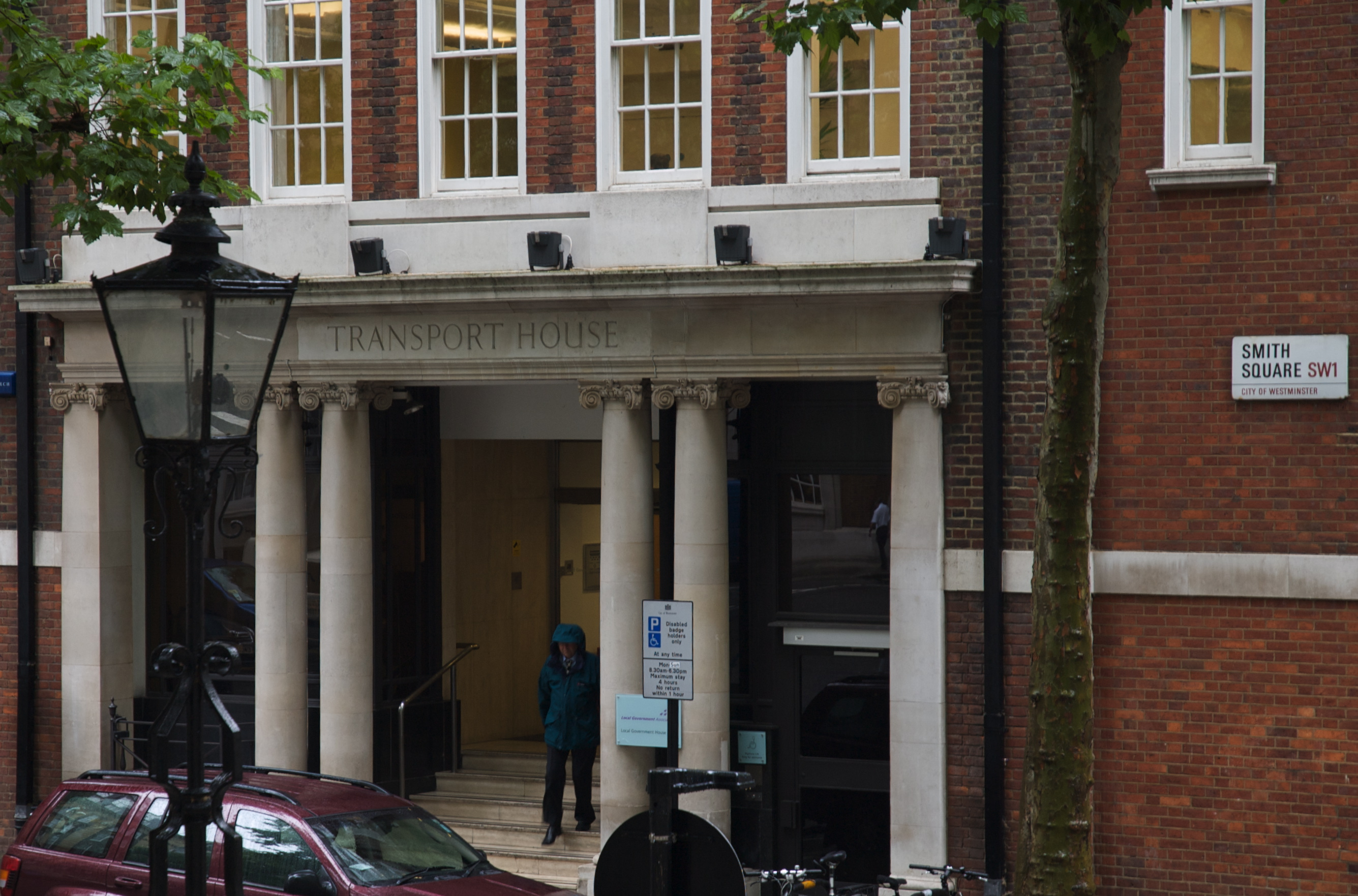
Transport House

Transport House was the headquarters of the Transport and General Workers' Union (T&G), and also originally of the Labour Party, the Trades Union Congress, and the Workers' Travel Association. The term "Transport House" was once a metonym for both Labour Party headquarters and the T&G.

The building located on Smith Square and Dean Bradley Street, London, England was owned by the T&G and officially opened in May 1928. The T&G started to occupy it from 1926, moving from their first headquarters in Matthew Parker Street. The TUC moved out to Congress House between 1956 and 1958. The Labour Party moved out in 1980, transferring its headquarters to what later became known as John Smith House. The T&G remained until the 1990s, when they moved to a modern building on Theobalds Road, Holborn, which is now also known as Transport House.

The original building is now called Local Government House and houses the headquarters of the Local Government Association and a conference centre.

The local headquarters of the T&G in a number of other cities were also called Transport House.
