= John Smith House, Southwark =

Former Labour Party headquarters at 144–152 Walworth Road in South London

Coordinates: 51.4907°N 0.0976°W

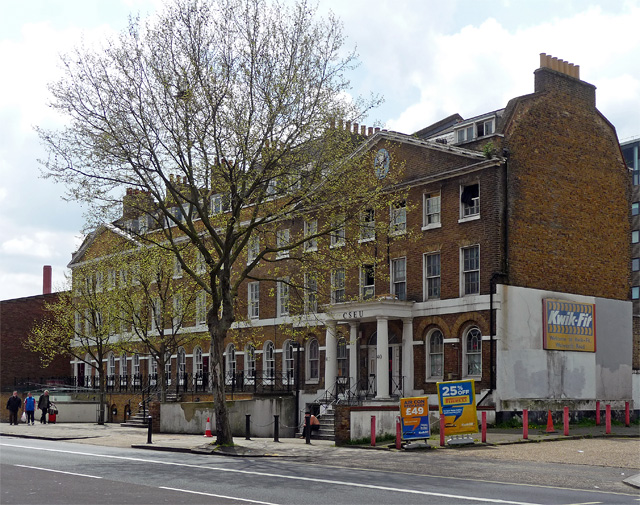
John Smith House (2013)

John Smith House is the former Labour Party headquarters at 144–152 Walworth Road in London. The party first occupied the building in 1980, vacating its former headquarters at Transport House.

It was renamed in memory of John Smith, the former leader of the Labour Party who died in office in May 1994, less than two years after becoming leader.

== History ==
Between 1995 and 1997, the Labour Party moved most of its functions from John Smith House to Millbank Tower, which became its official headquarters at the end of 1997, shortly after it formed a new government after winning the general election. The Labour Party Archive and Library moved in 1990 from Walworth Road to join the People's History Museum. John Smith House was formerly used by Southwark Local Education Authority before becoming the party headquarters.

Planning permission was granted in 2010 to turn it into the Safestay budget hotel, which opened in 2012.
