= XLN =

British utility company

XLN Business
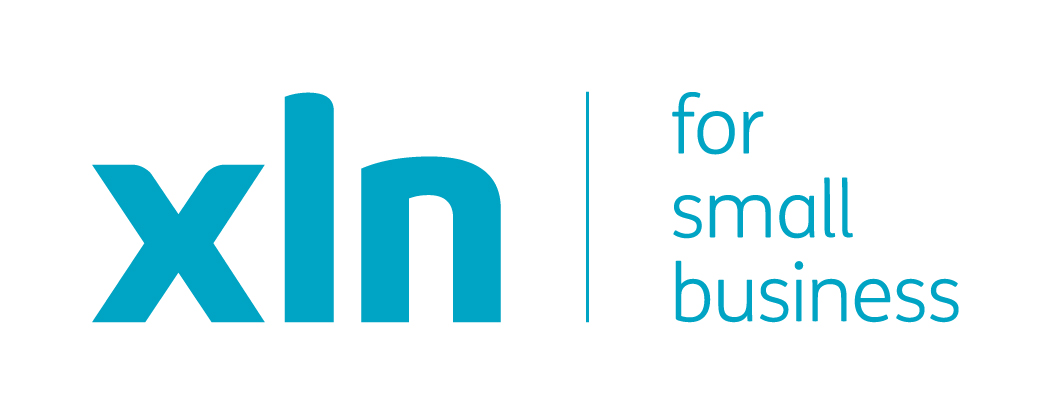
- Company type: Private limited company
- Industry: Telecommunications
- Founded: 2002; 24 years ago
- Headquarters: Millbank Tower, London, England
- Area served: United Kingdom
- Key people: Dave McGinn (CEO); Saeed Sheikh (COO)
- Products: Phone Line; Business Broadband; Business Fibre; Card Processing Solutions; Business Energy
- Revenue: £50 million-100 million (2014)
- Number of employees: 350 London - Sheffield - 150
- Website: xln.co.uk

XLN (XLN Business Services) is a UK-based company specializing in providing utility services for small businesses. Founded in 2002 by Christian Nellemann, the company focuses on telecommunications, business mobile services, card processing machines, and business energy. With over 700,000 customers across the UK, XLN offers products such as business broadband, phone lines, fibre broadband, mobile services, and card processing.

Headquartered in London and with a secondary office in Sheffield, XLN supports its customers through several call centers.

== History ==
XLN began in 2002 when founder, Christian Nellemann, identified a gap in the market for a telecoms provider that focuses on small businesses. Nellemann started selling business telecoms door-to-door, and after building up a customer base expanded the product range to include card processing, energy, and fibre broadband.

In 2008, Nellemann led a management buyout of XLN with Palatine Private Equity and again in 2010 when ECI Partners acquired a majority stake in the company.

== Services ==
Business broadband XLN provides business broadband to small businesses in three key packages: Unlimited Broadband, Unlimited Fibre and Unlimited Fibre XL. Each package offers different features, from unlimited broadband with a free router to 75 Mbit/s Fibre with free public Wi-Fi, unlimited phone calls and free online security. Broadband can be purchased with a business phone line, or by itself. XLN uses the BT Openreach and TalkTalk Business networks to provide its business broadband and telephone services.

Business phone Like its business broadband products, XLN offers business phone lines in its Basix, Xtra and Max packages. The basic package provides line rental and free online account management and support, while the Max package includes extras like mobile minutes and unlimited UK landline calls. Businesses can choose which package best suits their requirements.

Business Fibre One of XLN's latest products is Business Fibre, which uses the growing fibre broadband network to deliver high-speed internet to businesses around the country. Whereas its standard broadband offers speeds of up to 17 Mb, XLN Business Fibre quotes speeds of up to 76 Mb.

Card processing machines As well as broadband and business phone lines, XLN also offers card processing machines, including countertop, portable, and mobile card machines to merchants.

Free Public Wi-Fi In 2016, XLN began offering free public Wi-Fi hotspot to any business customer with a fibre broadband connection. As of 2017, it was the biggest free public Wi-Fi network in the UK.

XLN Mobile In 2018, XLN started offering free mobile SIMs, with unlimited minutes and texts, to all of its existing customers.

Business energy XLN provides business gas and electricity

== Location ==
XLN is based in the UK, with its head office at Millbank Tower in London. In 2014, the company expanded to open a second office at One North Bank Sheffield. All of its call centres are run from these locations.
