= Conservative Campaign Headquarters =

Conservative party headquarters

Coordinates: 51.5004°N 0.1311°W

- Predecessor: Conservative Central Office
- Formation: 1871 C&UCO; 2014 CCHQ
- Location: 1‑2 Castle Lane, Westminster, London, SW1E 6DR
- Region served: United Kingdom
- Chairman: Kevin Hollinrake
- Deputy Chairman: Matt Vickers
- Parent organisation: Conservative Party
- Website: conservatives.com

The Conservative Campaign Headquarters (CCHQ), formerly known as Conservative Central Office (CCO), is the headquarters of the British Conservative Party, housing its central staff and committee members, including campaign coordinators and managers. It is based in London, as are the Labour Party Headquarters and Liberal Democrat Headquarters.

== Campaigning ==
CCHQ is responsible for all campaigning of the Conservative Party, though it delegates responsibility for local campaigns to constituency Conservative Associations. It maintains overall responsibility for targeting voters and seats, including shortlisting and finalising the selection of Conservative candidates across the United Kingdom for local and national elections. It is presided by the Chairman of the Conservative Party with assistance from the Conservative Director of Communications.

Following the 2017 general election in which the Conservative Party did not do as well as had been expected, CCHQ was described as "rusty" and less effective than it had been during previous elections in coordinating and managing its campaign.

The CCHQ Activist Centre, which is the section of CCHQ that provides guidance to local Conservative Associations and candidates, was closed down following the 2017 general election, with resources now being distributed directly by staff rather than passively through the online database to external Conservative staff.

=== Phone bank ===
CCHQ is used as a phone bank for volunteers, and is most active at general elections and some by-elections. The CCHQ Voter Communications Team also coordinates and manages data from local Conservative call centres.

The call centre at Neath in Wales was the subject of scrutiny by the Electoral Commission following an investigation by The Guardian over alleged breach of marketing rules. It had employed paid staff to do its calling instead of volunteers and is alleged to have bribed some staff for underhand calling tactics. Subsequent allegations have also been reported about the conduct of other Conservative staff.

The CCHQ phone bank uses the Conservative Party's online calling database, "Votesource". This database was created in-house, but has not always functioned efficiently.

== Location ==
=== Pre-1912: Carlton Club ===
Before 1912, political organisation of the Conservatives was largely undertaken at the Carlton Club on St James's Street.

=== 1912–1958: Abbey House ===
Until 1958, Conservative Central Office was based at Abbey House, Victoria, London.

=== 1958–2004: 32 Smith Square ===
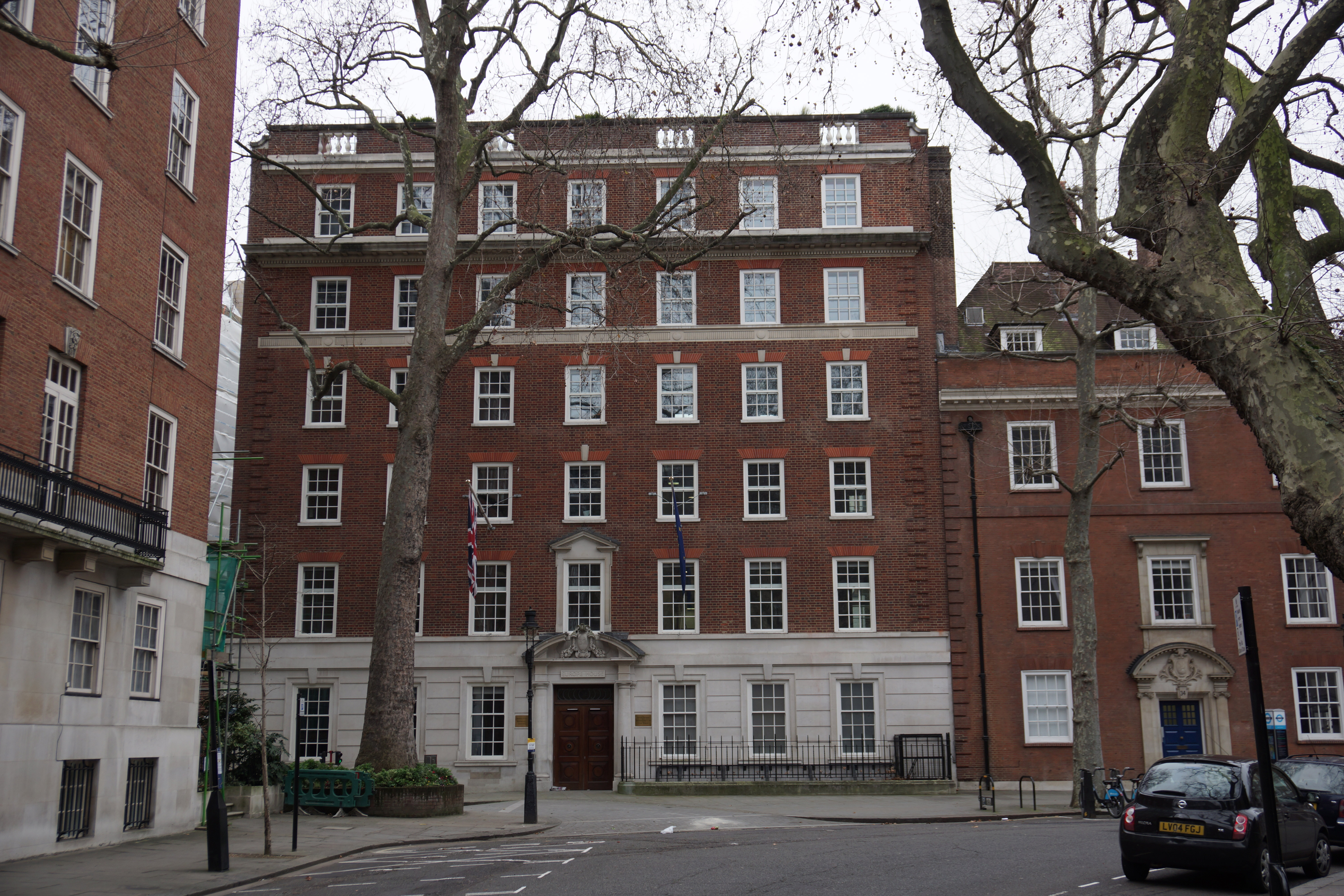
32 Smith Square, now Europe House, used between 1958 and 2004

CCO then moved to 32 Smith Square. This was the scene of multiple televised historic moments and symbolic photographs, including for the election victories of Margaret Thatcher and John Major, though later began to be associated with party infighting. In the 1980s, the Conservatives signed a lease for the property with a rent of £1 per year, which made the building unable to be developed into luxury flats or offices.

The party initially announced it would sell the premises in 2003, though in 2004 decided to keep its lease with plans to redevelop the building. The party agreed to move to "new, more suitable premises as soon as possible", with then Shadow Home Secretary David Davis stating it had "got old and we need to find rather more purpose-built accommodation for modern use". The premises and their adjoining building were eventually sold in February 2007, raising £15 million. The European Commission and European Parliament jointly bought the house in 2010, renaming it Europe House, and it has since acted as the delegation of the European Union to the United Kingdom. In 2017, Conservative MPs and Brexiteers such as Jacob Rees-Mogg and Conor Burns called for the house to be returned to the party, though a leaked memo from Klaus Welle suggested that Europe House would likely be kept by the EU.

=== 2004–2007: 25 Victoria Street ===
Party co-chairman Liam Fox announced in April 2004 that the CCO would move to 25 Victoria Street following the 2004 United Kingdom local elections in June for "modern, purpose-built accommodation and a superb working environment for staff to campaign and win forthcoming elections at a local, national and European levels." The move was initially planned to take place before the elections, but negotiations on the lease took longer than expected. The offices were notably positioned above a Starbucks coffee shop, and reportedly included a "war room" for the upcoming 2005 general election. The building subsequently became known as Conservative Campaign Headquarters (CCHQ).

=== 2007–2014: Millbank Tower ===
On 6 March 2007, CCHQ moved again, this time to 30 Millbank, part of the property portfolio of David and Simon Reuben.

=== 2014–2026: 4 Matthew Parker Street ===
On 10 February 2014, CCHQ moved to rented offices within 4 Matthew Parker Street, in Westminster, including most of the ground and basement floors of the commercial property.

=== 2026–present: 1-2 Castle Lane ===
On 11 June 2026, The Conservative Party moved CCHQ to its current location on Castle Lane, near its previous Matthew Parker Street offices. These new premises were purchased outright by the Conservative Foundation at a cost of £14.3m, mostly funded by a donation left by John Sainsbury, to house the campaigning arm of the Party.

== Establishment ==
The establishment of Conservative Central Office dates back to 1871, with the creation of professional support for the Party by Sir John Gorst. Following election defeats in 1906 and 1910, in 1911 the post of Party Chairman was created to oversee the work of the Central Office.

== Incidents and controversies ==
On 10 November 2010, 30 Millbank was attacked by student protesters as part of a demonstration against rises in tuition fees.

On 19 November 2014, demonstrators taking part in a free education demonstration in central London clashed with police outside 4 Matthew Parker Street, where the Conservative Campaign Headquarters relocated in February 2014.

In June 2017, following the 2017 general election, CCHQ was blamed for the worse-than-expected result, with a number of new appointments, such as new Conservative Director of Communications, Carrie Symonds. Ms. Symonds claimed that there was "lots to do" in her new role.

=== "factcheckUK" ===
On 19 November 2019, for the duration of a televised leadership debate between the leader Boris Johnson and his Labour counterpart Jeremy Corbyn, hosted by ITV in the run up to the 2019 general election, the CCHQ press office's Twitter page (@CCHQPress) was renamed 'factcheckUK' – it did not change the Twitter handle to maintain the account's verified status, to post Conservative rebuttals to Labour's statements about them during the debate.

Conservative Party chairman James Cleverly defended it, stating "The Twitter handle of the CCHQ press office remained CCHQPress, so it's clear the nature of the site", and as "calling out when the Labour Party put what they know to be complete fabrications in the public domain".

In response, the Electoral Commission, which does not have a role in regulating election campaign content, called on all campaigners to act "responsibly", fact-checking body Full Fact criticised this behaviour as "inappropriate and misleading", and a spokesperson from Twitter said that "Any further attempts to mislead people by editing verified profile information – in a manner seen during the UK Election Debate – will result in decisive corrective action."

==== "Tax Check UK" ====
On 26 June 2024, the CCHQPress profile was renamed "Tax Check UK" during a leadership debate between Rishi Sunak and Keir Starmer hosted by ITV as part of the 2024 general election campaign.
