= Passing Clouds =

Community run music venue

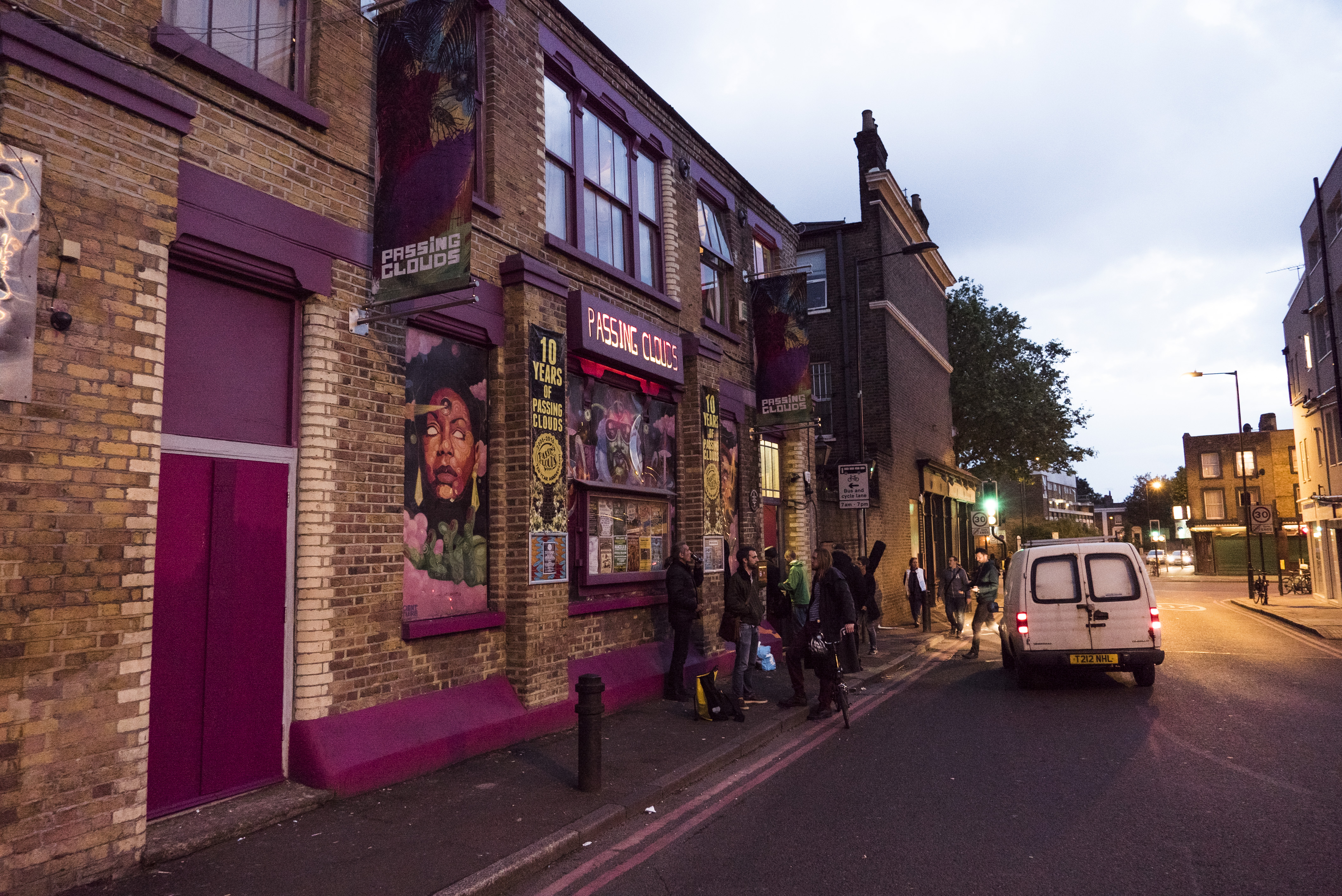
- Passing Clouds, Dalston
- Interactive map of Passing Clouds
- Former names: Hackney Gazette Printworks
- Address: 1 Richmond Rd, London E8 4AA; Hackney, London; England
- Coordinates: 51.542231°N 0.075567°W
- Owner: Landhold Development
- Type: Live music venue, community hub
- Current use: Music, events

Construction
- Opened: 2006
- Closed: 2016

Website
- www.passingclouds.org

Passing Clouds was a community run music venue near Kingsland Road, Dalston in East London. Founded in 2006, the venue was used for a range of activities. It was closed down in 2016, squatted and then finally evicted. After a period of dereliction it was announced in 2019 that it would re-open as a different venue.

== Foundation ==
Passing Clouds was founded in 2006 by Eleanor Wilson. According to events manager Gudrun Getz, "She was heavily involved in the African music scene and wanted to open a space that would showcase all this incredible talent, as well as being a community hub for creativity, activism and grassroots political and artistic movements. She saw this empty building one day, knew it was The One and managed to talk our landlady into the idea."

Passing Clouds was located in a building on Richmond Road off Kingsland Road in East London which at one point was home to the Hackney Gazette printworks. It described itself as a "hub for cultural and community events including the Permaculture Picturehouse, East in East, Palestine Solidarity film screenings, healing events, self-development workshops, music lessons, and swing dance classes". It was noted as one of the best live music venues and community centres in London by Time Out and The Guardian.

The management of Passing Clouds attempted unsuccessfully to persuade the owner of the property to sell them the building, and in 2015 were informed that it had been sold to a firm of property developers called Landhold Development. Landhold Development allowed Passing Clouds to stay until there was an offer for the venue, which was received in February 2016.

== Eviction and Re-occupation ==
The venue's management wrongly believed they had sealed a deal to extend their contract by three months and were therefore surprised on 16 June 2016 to see bailiffs arriving to change the locks. Supporters then converged and reclaimed the building. A complaint was registered with the police regarding the actions of the development company, but it was dismissed given that the company was found to have acted appropriately, and the building was now squatted.

On 16 August, after backing out of negotiations to extend Passing Clouds' lease (given that they had no legal obligation to do so), Landhold Development sent in bailiffs again to evict the squatters and board up the venue.

Around 2000 protesters demonstrated against the closure of Passing Clouds and other music venues in London by marching from Hoxton to Passing Clouds on 17 September 2016. Meanwhile, around 30 of London's music venues held a minute's silence to protest the closure of Passing Clouds and other cultural venues. Along with the closure of Fabric nightclub, Passing Clouds was held up by campaigners as an example of how cultural venues in London have been disappearing due to a lack of legal protection and the desire of property developers to buy land on which to build luxury housing.

In 2016 it was announced that the venue had been sold to developers to turn into offices or flats. The building was closed and boarded up that year. Meanwhile, a group of 100s of local people put together an application for the building to be protected as an Asset of Community Value. This gave status to the building requiring that future users would have to continue to provide community events for local people, and making it more difficult for the developers to convert the premises into a residential building. In 2019 it was announced that the building would be reopening as "The Jago".

== Gallery ==
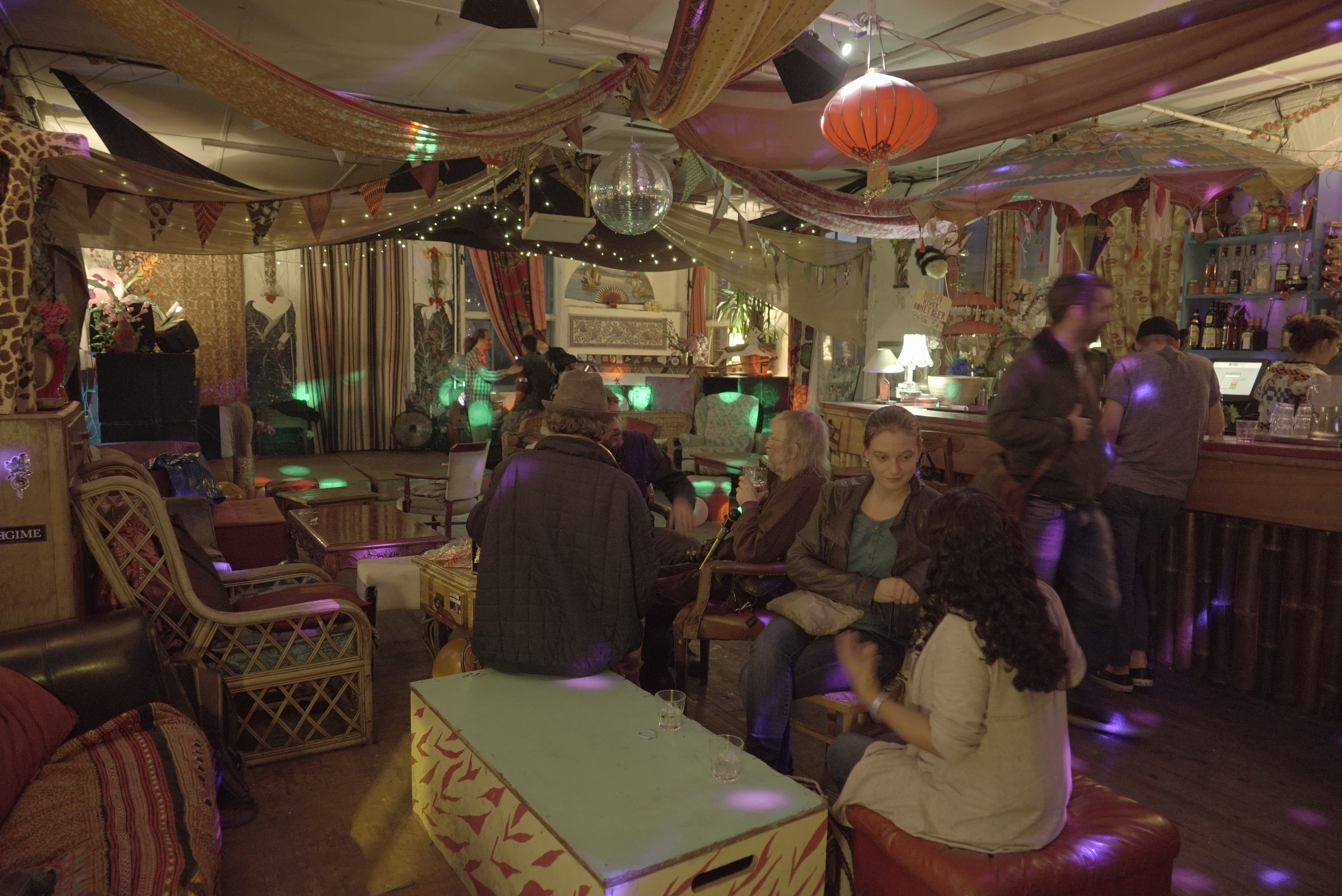
Interior during the occupation in June 2016

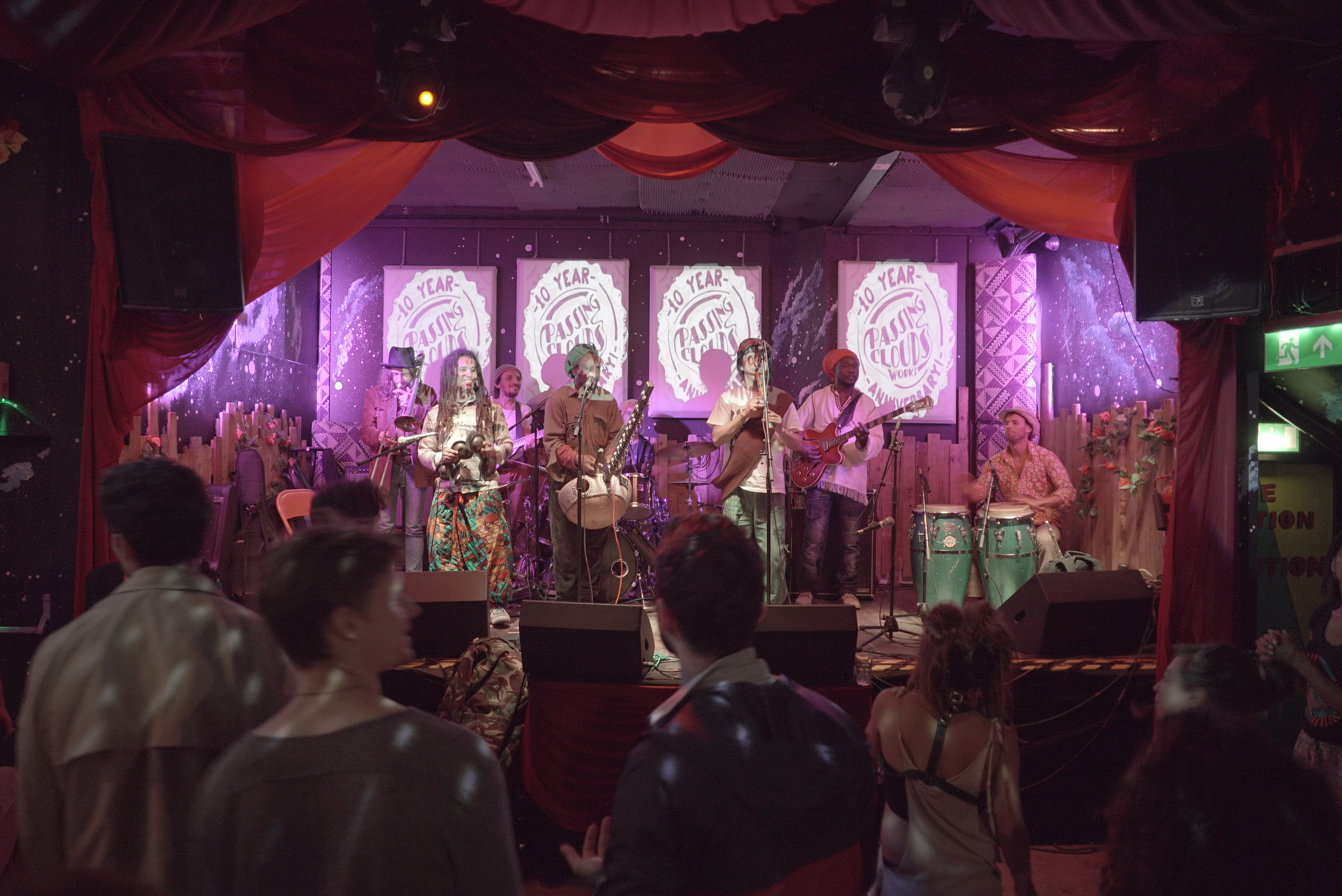
Musicians playing on the stage at Passing Clouds

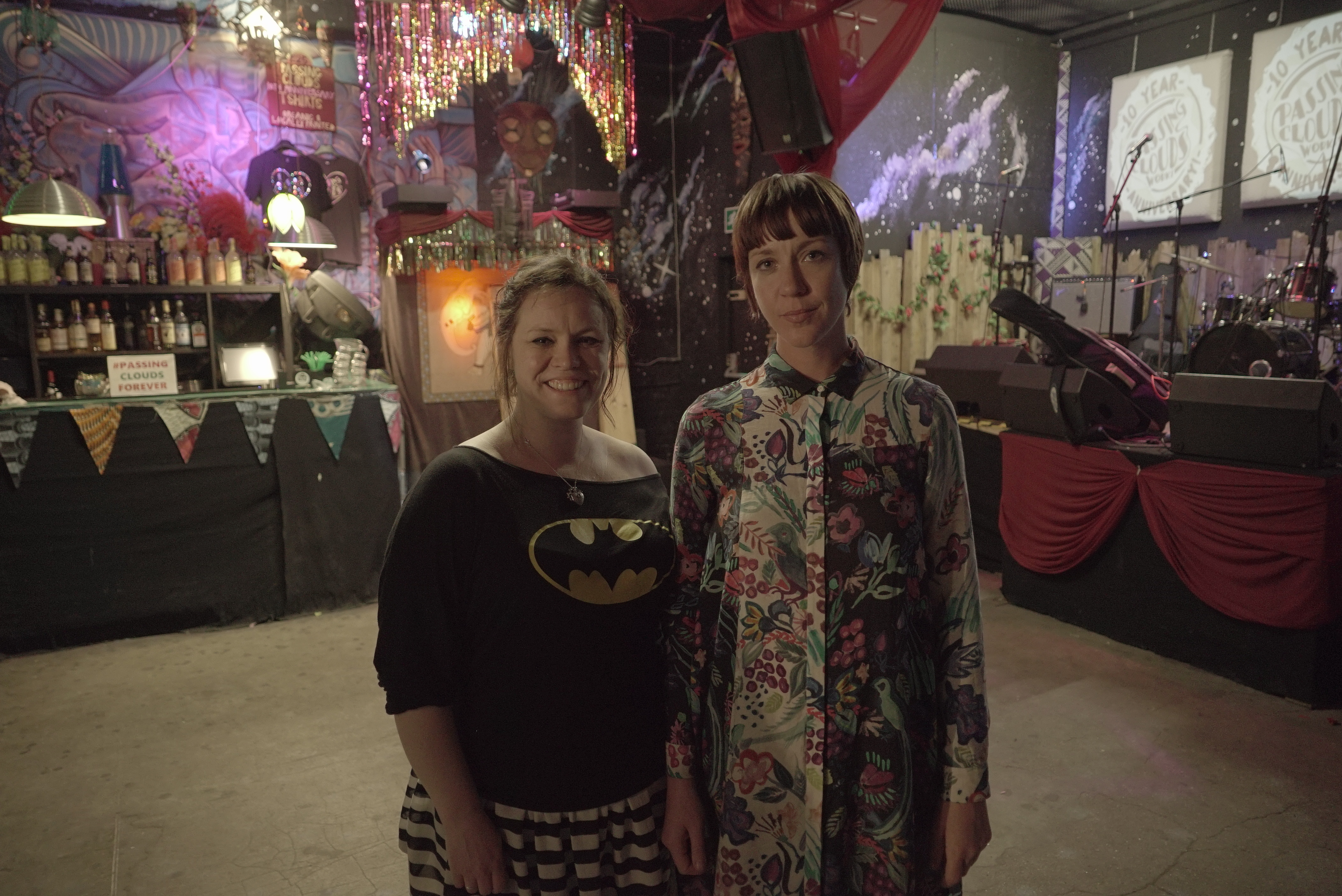
Some of the organisers of Passing Clouds

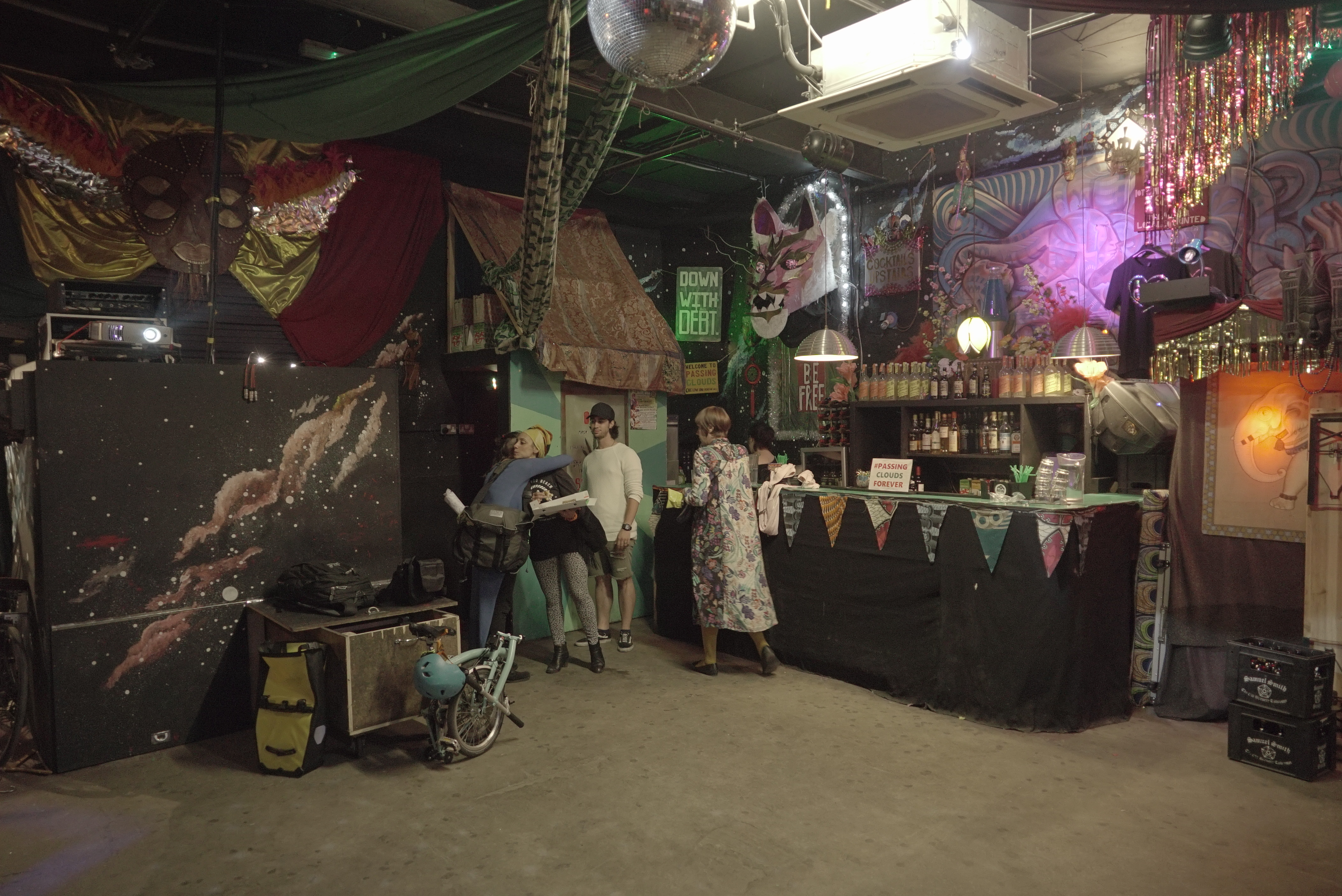
The interior of Passing Clouds
