= Liberal Democrat Headquarters =

Main offices of the UK Liberal Democrats

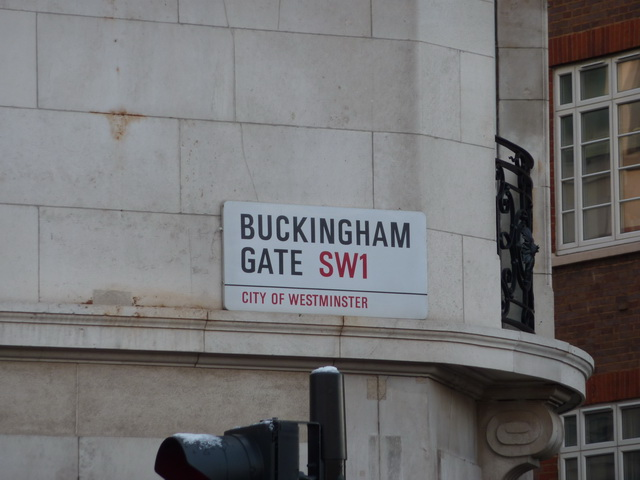
Buckingham Gate in Westminster, on which the current Liberal Democrat headquarters are located

The Liberal Democrat Headquarters is the principal centre of operations and offices of the British Liberal Democrats. As of September 2025, the headquarters of the party is located at 66 Buckingham Gate, London, SW1E 6AU. The headquarters is located within two miles of the Houses of Parliament, as are the Labour Party Headquarters and the Conservative Campaign Headquarters (formerly known as Conservative Central Office).

Scottish Liberal Democrats have their own headquarters, which are located at Clifton Terrace in Edinburgh, whilst the Welsh Liberal Democrats' headquarters are based at Bute Street, in Cardiff.

== Locations (1988–present) ==
=== 1988–2011: 4 Cowley Street ===
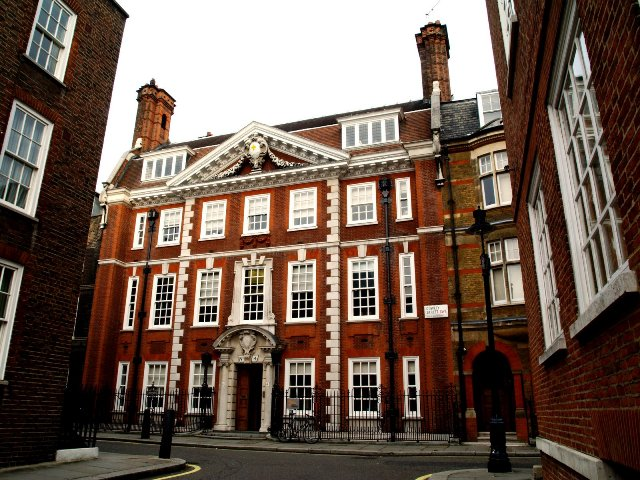
4 Cowley Street

From its formation in 1988, the Liberal Democrats were based at 4 Cowley Street, a Grade II listed Edwardian mansion built in 1905. The party signed a new lease on the building in 2000. Prior to the Liberal Democrats occupying the building, it had been the headquarters of the Social Democratic Party since 1981, and before that had also been the London and North Eastern Railway headquarters.

In March 2011, the party announced they were planning to vacate Cowley Street. At the time, the party had been reducing staff numbers after entering government due to the loss of Short Money, though it denied that the move had been forced due to poor finances, stating that "more modern and more appropriate buildings" were needed and that "Cowley Street does not meet the staff numbers we have got."

=== 2011–2021: 8–10 Great George Street ===
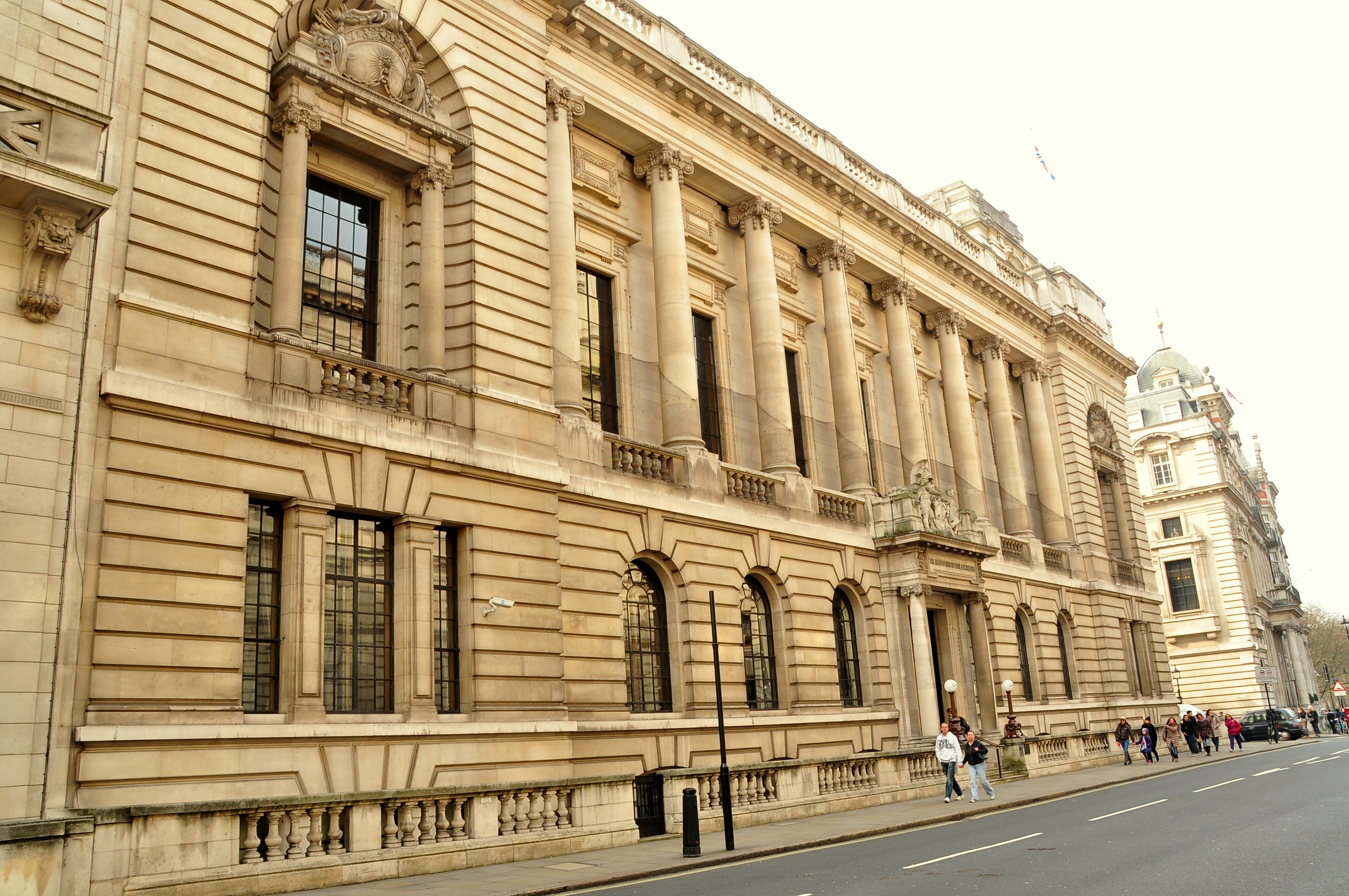
8–10 Great George Street

The headquarters relocated to an office on a single floor of 8–10 Great George Street, Westminster in May 2011, close to Parliament Square. The Independent described the office as "minimalist" compared to the previous Cowley Street "rabbit warren", and compared it to offices seen in political comedy The Thick of It. The party intended for the open plan design to facilitate better communications. The building was first built in the 1930s with an 1800s Beaux-Arts exterior.

In October 2019, Westminster City Council gave planning permission for 8–10 Great George Street, which was still occupied by the Liberal Democrats at the time, to be converted into a 134-bed hotel.

=== 2021–2025: 1 Vincent Square ===
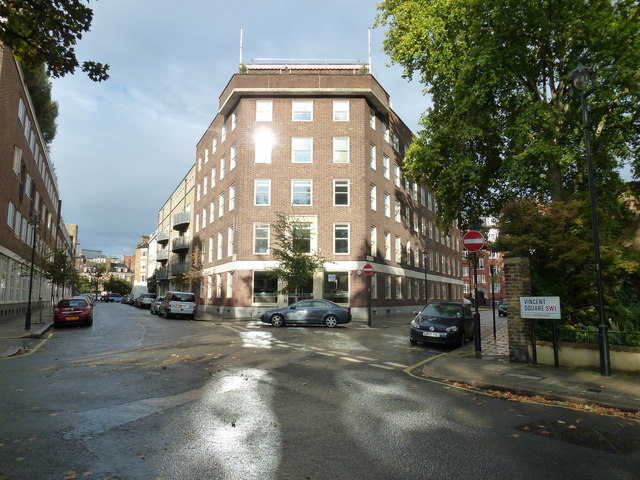
1 Vincent Square

The headquarters moved to a single floor of 1 Vincent Square in 2021. The office space totalled 3,700 square feet (340 m^{2}). According to Siân Waddington, Director of Operations, it was designed to give staff flexibility and enable "debate and collaboration", whilst reflecting the Liberal Democrats’ mission to create a “fairer, greener, more caring Britain”.

At the Spring Conference 2025, in Harrogate, it was announced during the Federal Board's report that the party had been given notice to leave the 1 Vincent Square headquarters, as the landlord wished to redevelop the building. The party was reported to use this decision as an opportunity to assess its longer-term needs, following the increase in parliamentary representation and remote work.

=== 2025–present: 66 Buckingham Gate ===
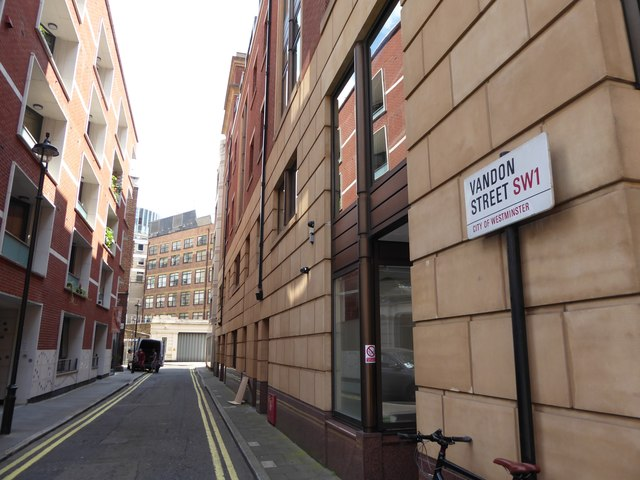
The back of the building on Vandon Street

In September 2025, the party headquarters moved to 66 Buckingham Gate in London; the building is located on the interchange of Buckingham Gate and Vandon Street.

== See also ==
- Conservative Campaign Headquarters
- Labour Party Headquarters
