= Altitude London =

Venues inside Millbank Tower, London, England

Coordinates: 51.4922°N 0.1259°W

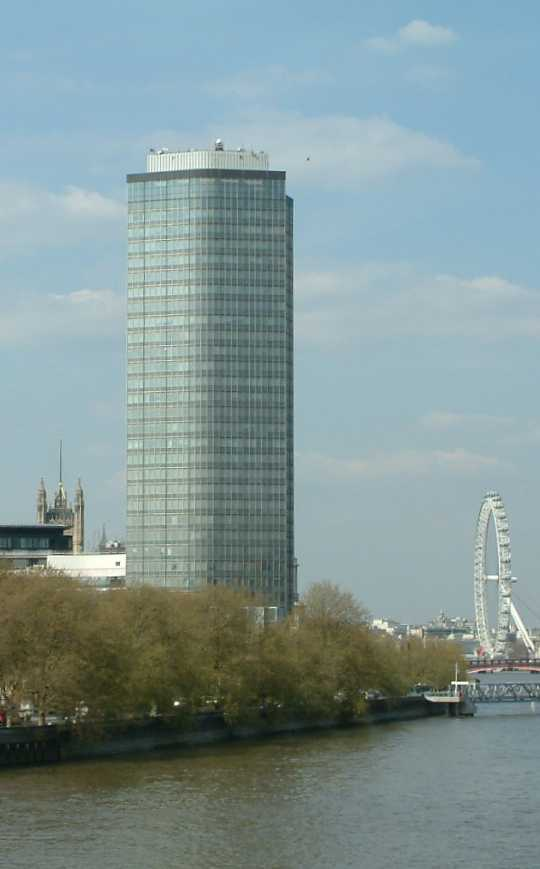
Altitude 360 is at the top of the Millbank Tower.

Altitude London was a collection of venues in the 387 ft (118 m)-high Millbank Tower, a skyscraper in central London, covering over 30,000 sq ft (2,800 m^{2}) of event space. Its businesses, Altitude 360° London, the River Room London, the MillBank Cinema & Media Centre and the View Collection, once made up London's largest riverside venue as well as London's largest venue located in a skyscraper. The venue was originally opened in three phases: the first phase being opened in September 2007 by the then Leader of the Opposition David Cameron, the second phase was opened by former London Mayor Boris Johnson and the final third phase opened in May 2010, by former Prime Minister David Cameron.

One of the final parts to open was the Altitude Viewing Gallery on the 29th floor.

The global brand owner sold the business to the current management firm, Alan Turtill, Sam Simpson and Mike Hockey in 2018 whilst retaining the IP and brand rights.

The business closed temporarily during the COVID-19 pandemic and has since permanently closed.
