= Bonnie Bird Theatre =

Coordinates: 51.4803°N 0.0189°W

Bonnie Bird Theatre is the 300-seat main performing venue of the Laban Dance Centre of the Trinity Laban Conservatoire of Music and Dance in London, England.

The Laban Centre was erected in 2002, designed by winners of the Pritzker Architecture Prize, Jacques Herzog and Pierre de Meuron. The building and its theatre are located in Deptford Creek, near Greenwich in east London. The theatre is named for Bonnie Bird, the pioneering American modern dancer and dance educator who with Marion North instituted the first academic degrees in dance in the United Kingdom at Laban.

The theatre was used in the music video for 'Ingenue' by Atoms for Peace, featuring frontman Thom Yorke with dancer Fukiko Takase.
