= UK India Business Council =

Membership-based, non-profit organisation

UK India Business Council (UKIBC)
- Type: Non-profit
- Founded: 1993 as Indo-British Partnership; 2007 as UK India Business Council
- Headquarters: Victoria, London, London, United Kingdom Gurgaon, Delhi NCR
- Key people: Richard McCallum (Group CEO), Richard Heald (Chairman)
- Services: Policy and advocacy Strategic advisory
- Website: www.ukibc.com

The UK India Business Council (UKIBC) is a membership-based, non-profit organization founded in 2007 to foster trade and business relations between the United Kingdom and India. The organization works with businesses in both countries, as well as the UK and Indian governments, to promote and increase bilateral trade. The UK India Business Council supports UK businesses with the insights, networks, policy advocacy, services, and facilities needed to succeed in India.

UKIBC (UK India Business Council) is a sister organization to the UK-ASEAN Business Council

The UK India Business Council is the sole accredited UK Government Overseas Business Network Initiative provider for India. UKIBC is accredited by British Chambers of Commerce and works in partnership with UK Department for Business and Trade.

== History ==
UKIBC has its origins in the Indo British Partnership (IBP) initiative, signed by then Prime Ministers John Major and P. V. Narasimha Rao in 1993. In 2005 this evolved into a private limited company called the 'Indo British Partnership Network (IBPN). With the UKIBC receiving increased investment in 2007 from UK Trade & Investment under direction from then UK Chancellor Gordon Brown, Sharon Bamford was appointed CEO to oversee the transition of the organization.

== Organization and Leadership ==
The Rt Hon Patricia Hewitt has been Chair of the UK India Business Council since 2009. Lord Karan Bilimoria, is the founding Chairman of the UK-India Business Council. Lord Mervyn Davies, Baron Davies of Abersoch served as the Chair of UK India Business Council in July 2017 until September 2020. Since then, Richard Heald, OBE has taken up the position, stepping up from his role as CEO since 2010. In July 2020, Jayant Krishna, Tata Group veteran and former CEO of the National Skill Development Corporation, became the first Indian to be appointed Group CEO of UKIBC. In October 2022, Richard McCallum, previously Vice President of UKIBC in India, was announced as Group CEO.

UKIBC deals with major sectors, such as:

- Advanced Engineering and Manufacturing
- Digital Innovation
- Energy
- Food and Drink
- Financial, Legal and Professional Services
- Infrastructure
- Life Sciences and Healthcare
- Retail, Lifestyle and Logistics
- Skills and Education
- Sports and gaming
- Advanced Science

== Facilities ==
=== Market Entry ===
UKIBC provides sector-specific research and market entry-related services to help British companies understand the opportunities and make informed choices about their investment.

=== Food and Drink, Retail and E-Commerce ===
UKIBC is mandated by HMG's Department of International Trade to assist in day-to-day events to include Policy, Market Access, Advocacy, and Trade Promotion for the F&D, Retail, and E-Com sector.

== Strategic partners ==
The UKIBC is partnered with major following companies -

- UK Trade & Investment
- Standard Chartered
- PricewaterhouseCoopers
- Barclays
- British Airways
- BT
- Cipla
- Dell
- Diageo
- HSBC
- Tata
- AgustaWestland

== See also ==
- British Business Groups (BBG)
