= Millbank Tower =

Skyscraper in London, England

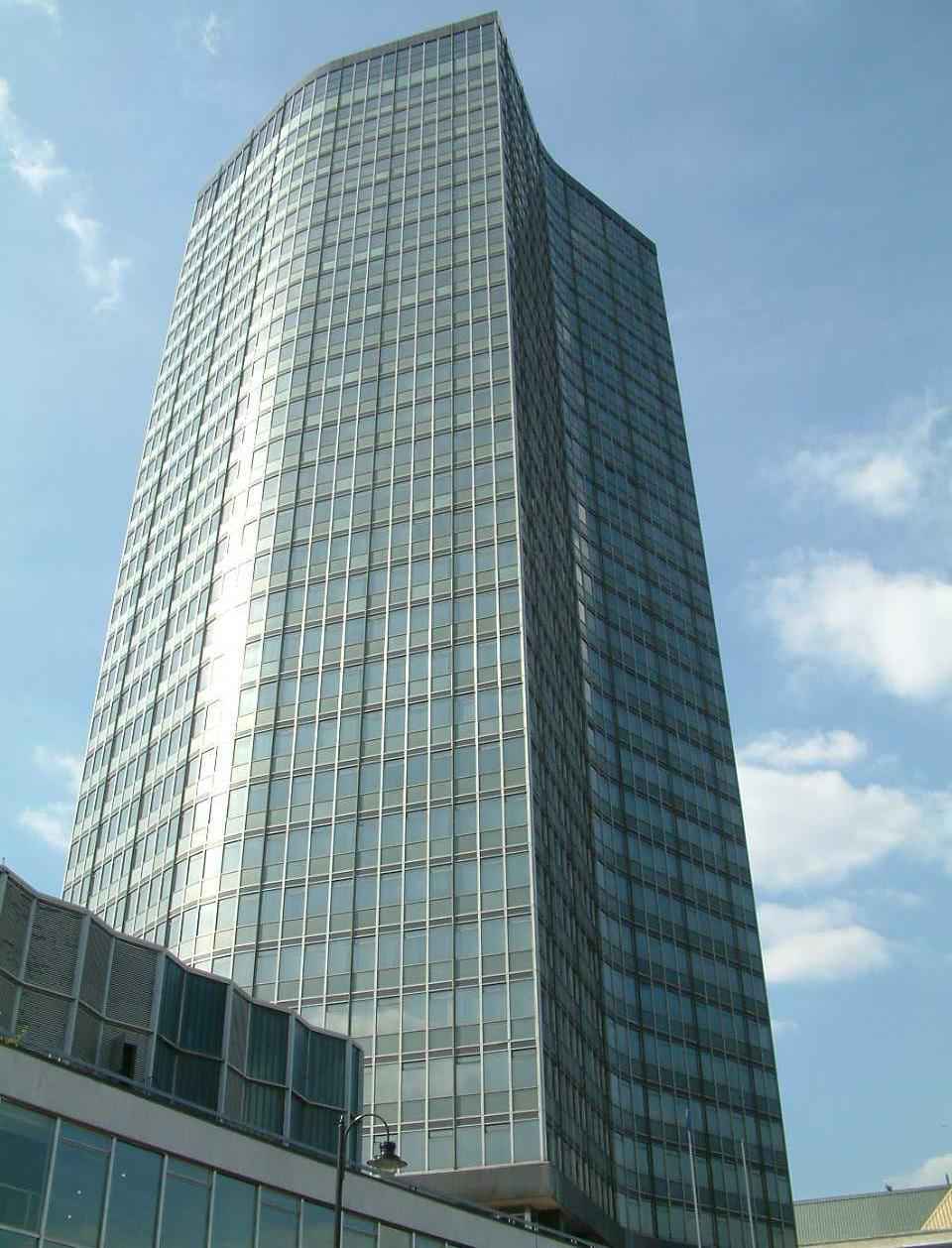
- Millbank Tower seen from the north

Record height
- Tallest in the United Kingdom from 1963 to 1964^{[I]}
- Preceded by: CIS Tower
- Surpassed by: BT Tower

General information
- Status: Completed
- Type: Office
- Location: Westminster; London, SW1; England
- Coordinates: 51°29′32.0″N 0°07′33.5″W
- Completed: 1963
- Owner: David and Simon Reuben

Height
- Roof: 118 metres (387 ft)

Technical details
- Lifts/elevators: 11: 4 × low rise Otis 411 Elevonics; 5 × high rise Otis 411 Elevonics; 1 × Otis 411 fire/goods all floors 1 × Otis 10UCL Ground to Basement Goods

Listed Building – Grade II
- Official name: Millbank Tower
- Designated: 24 November 1995
- Reference no.: 1242617

Design and construction
- Architects: Ronald Ward & Partners
- Main contractor: John Mowlem & Co.

Millbank Tower is a 119-metre-high (390 ft) skyscraper in the City of Westminster at Millbank, by the River Thames in London, England. The tower was constructed in 1963, and has been home to many high-profile political organisations, including the Labour and Conservative parties, the United Nations and Reform UK.

== History ==
The tower was constructed in 1963 for Vickers and was therefore originally known as Vickers House or the Vickers Tower. It was designed by Ronald Ward and Partners and built by John Mowlem & Co. It is a landmark on the London skyline, standing beside the River Thames, half a mile upstream from the Palace of Westminster. The tower has been owned by David and Simon Reuben since 2002, while still being managed by its former owner Tishman Speyer Properties. It is a Grade II listed building. Until the BT Tower's completion in 1964, Millbank Tower was the tallest building in the United Kingdom. The 2003 edition of the Pevsner architectural guide says that the Millbank Tower is "one of the few London office towers to have won affection", and contrasts it with the "boxy structure" of the Shell Tower at Waterloo.

In 2010, the building was surrounded and occupied by thousands of student protesters who spontaneously branched off from a demonstration called by the National Union of Students, which was campaigning against the Coalition government's increase of tuition fees; Millbank was the location of Conservative Campaign Headquarters at the time. The demonstration and occupation helped spawn further student protests that year.

== Occupants ==
The Millbank Tower has been home to many high-profile political and other organisations. From 1994 to 2002 the Labour Party rented two floors in the base at the south of the site, for use as a general election campaign centre. Labour ran its 1997 General Election campaign from these offices; after the election, the party vacated its headquarters at John Smith House, Walworth Road SE17, to move to Millbank. Five years later, the £1 million per annum rent forced the party to vacate the tower and take out a mortgage of £5.5 million to relocate to 16–18 Old Queen Street, overlooking St James's Park, which had 11,200 square feet of open plan premises.

The United Nations also had offices in the tower, but moved out in June 2003, also citing high rents. Other public bodies have continued to occupy the building, including the Central Statistical Office, the predecessor of the Office for National Statistics; the Parliamentary and Health Service Ombudsman; the Local Government Ombudsman; the UK India Business Council; and the Ministry of Justice Records Management Service.

Between 2006 and 2014, the Conservative Party based its campaign headquarters at 30 Millbank, in the same complex as Millbank Tower.

Other floors in the tower are or have been occupied by organisations and commercial companies, including the Environment Agency, the World Bank (which moved out in early 2022), Altitude 360 London, foreign exchange specialists World First, the Specialist Schools and Academies Trust, the UK India Business Council, the London office of Medopad, Canonical Ltd, the Audit Commission, event caterers Salt and Pepper, Private Food Design, the firm Lewis PR, the London office of the Open Society Foundations, the Local Government Boundary Commission for England, XLN Telecom and Leave.EU.

The building also housed the studios for RT UK prior to its closure in 2022.

From April 2018, the office of the now-defunct People's Vote campaign was based in the tower. The political party Reform UK has been headquartered in the tower since February 2025.

== Future ==
In April 2016, the Reuben brothers were granted permission by Westminster City Council to redevelop the building, notwithstanding its Grade II Listed status. The resulting development will comprise 207 high-end apartments, a 5-star hotel with 150 rooms, a gym, spa and swimming pool, and a new cultural centre. The redevelopment, which includes a plan for an additional three storeys on the main tower is set to break ground in 2024 once the existing tenancies cease.

== Gallery ==
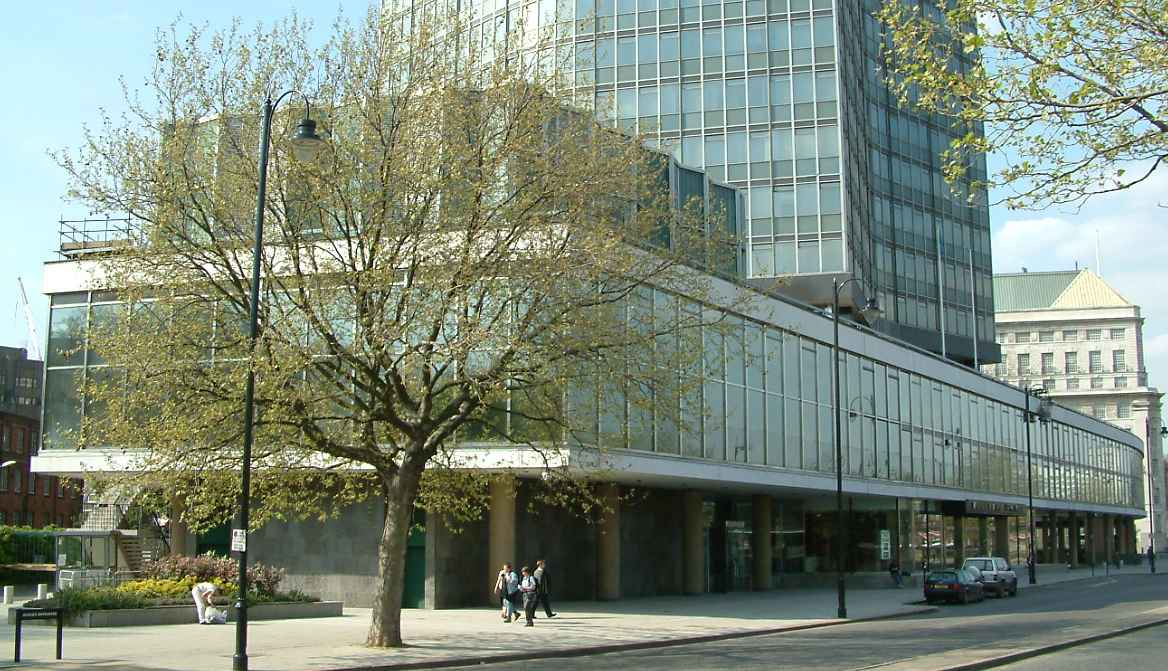
Millbank Tower base

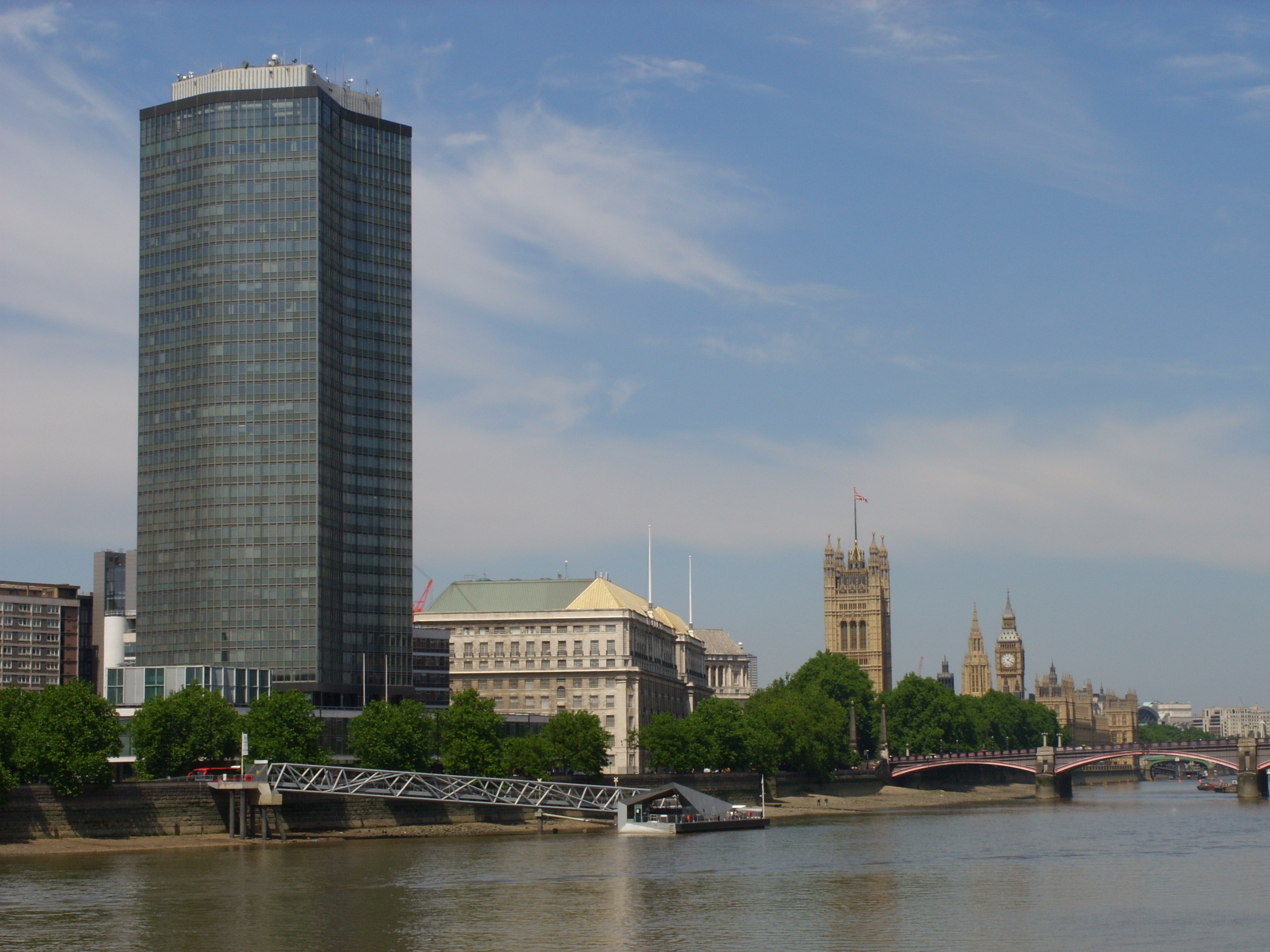
Millbank Tower from Vauxhall, with Thames House and the Palace of Westminster visible in the background

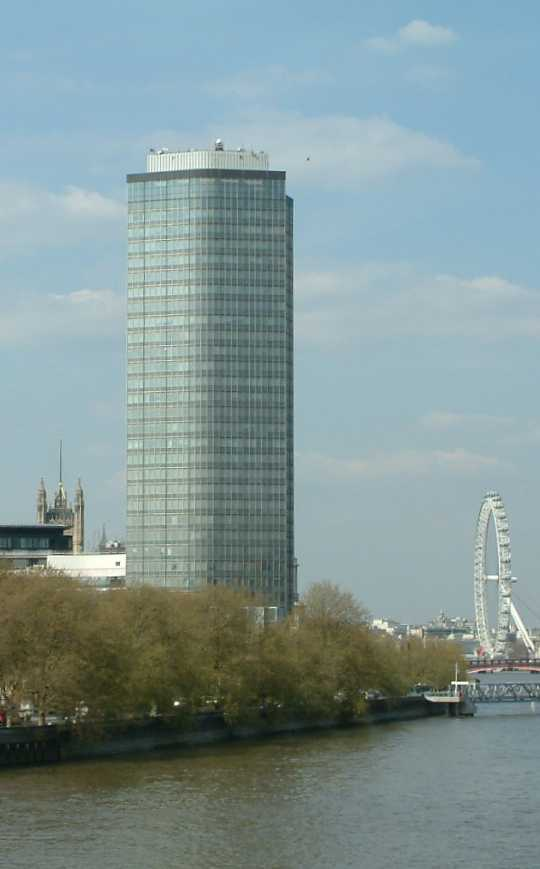
View of the Millbank Tower from Vauxhall bridge

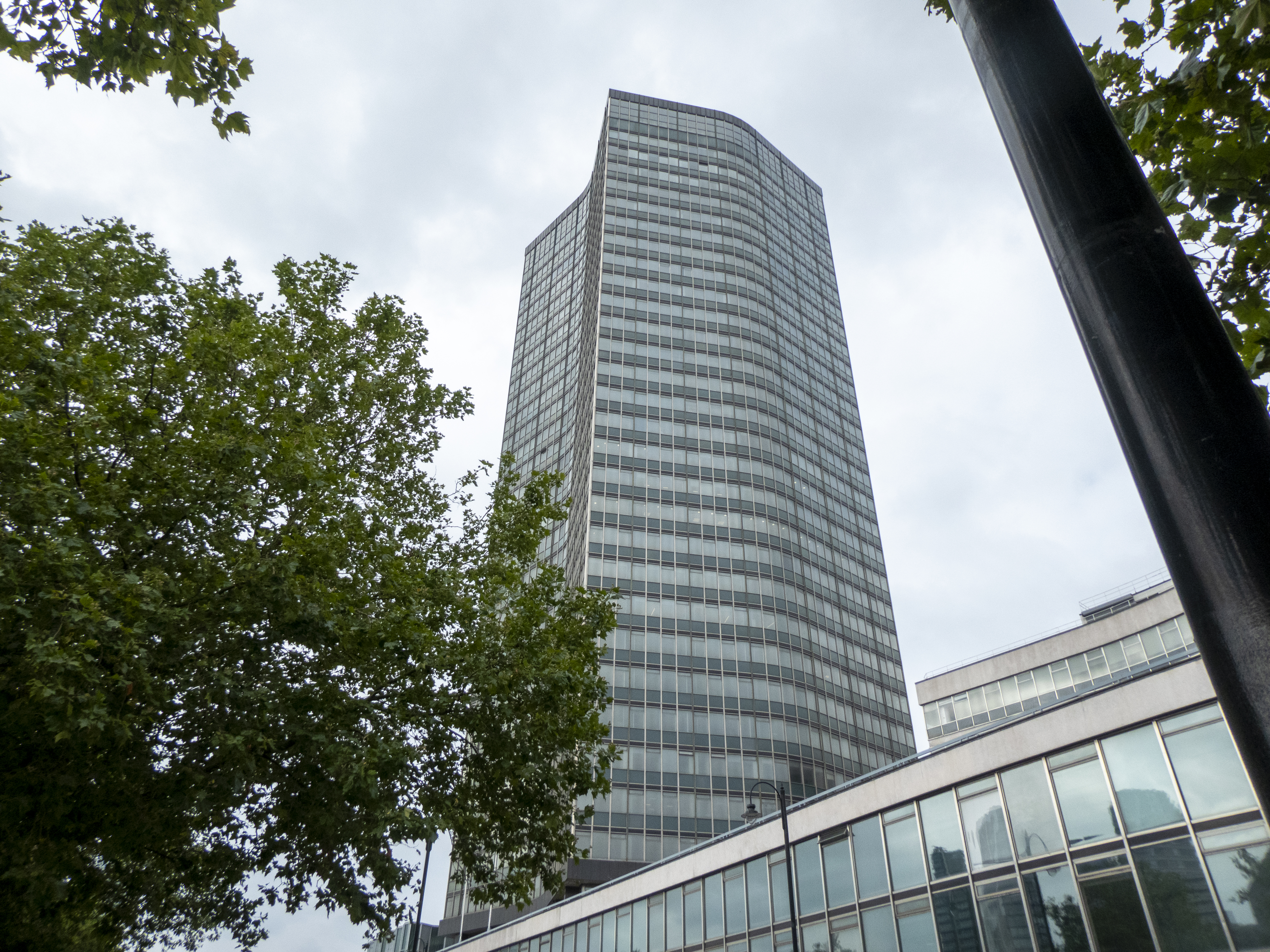
Millbank Tower from Millbank

Records
Preceded by CIS Tower	Tallest Building in the United Kingdom; 1963—1967; 118m	Succeeded by Post Office Tower
Preceded by Battersea Power Station	Tallest building in London; 1963—1967; 118m	Succeeded by Post Office Tower
