= Timeline of Scottish National Liberation Army actions =

This is a timeline of activities either claimed or carried out by the Scottish National Liberation Army (SNLA), a Scottish nationalist paramilitary organisation who advocate for Scottish independence from the United Kingdom. The group formed in 1980, following the 1979 Scottish devolution referendum, which saw a majority voting in favour of a devolved government, but the act was repealed due to a low voter turnout per the Scotland Act 1978.

== 1980s ==
=== 1982 ===
- 1 March: Bomb threats were made in Edinburgh, which the SNLA initially did not claim responsibility for, until a letter was sent to the Press Association by the group on 23 November.
- 17 March: The SNLA claimed responsibility for a letter bomb sent to the House of Commons addressed to then-Secretary of State for Defence John Nott, allegedly in response to a decision made on the UK's Trident programme.
- 19 March: The SNLA claimed responsibility for two letter bombs discovered and defused at two Social Democratic Party offices in Edinburgh and Glasgow, during the 1982 Glasgow Hillhead by-election.
- 24 May: The SNLA claimed to have planted an incendiary device at the Scottish Assembly building during a Scottish Grand Committee conference.
- 19 June: A letter bomb claimed by the group was discovered and defused at the Conservative party's Edinburgh office.
- 29 July: The SNLA claimed to have sent a letter bomb to Buckingham Palace, targeted at The Queen, though this was discounted by Scotland Yard.
- 10 August: The SNLA claimed to have sent a letter bomb to the Conservative Party HQ in London, which was determined by Scotland Yard to have been a hoax package.
- 6 November: A fire severely damaged the Labour Party's then Scottish headquarters, Keir Hardie House, in Glasgow. The attack was attributed to the SNLA, although the group consistently denied responsibility.
- 8 November: The SNLA claimed responsibility for a fire that occurred at a Conservative Party office in Kelvingrove, Glasgow.
- 19 November: The SNLA claimed another letter bomb that was posted to then-Secretary of State for Industry Patrick Jenkin, following a decision made by the British Steel Corporation to downsize a Craigneuk, steel mill, which resulted in 427 job losses.
- 2 December: An arson attack occurred at the Labour Party's Dundee headquarters, trapping three students in the flat above who were later rescued. The attack was initially claimed by Arm nan Gàidheal, a short-lived paramilitary group linked to Scottish ultranationalist group Siol nan Gaidheal. However, the attack was later claimed by the SNLA.

=== 1983 ===
- 17 February: The SNLA claimed responsibility for a letter bomb delivered to the Glasgow City Chambers, in which the group claimed was in protest to an upcoming visit from Diana, Princess of Wales. The bomb caused minor injures to the secretary of then-Lord Provost of Glasgow Michael Kelly.
- 15 March: A letter bomb exploded at the US Navy’s former European headquarters in Grosvenor Square, London, injuring an officer. The SNLA claimed responsibility for the device in a letter sent to the Glasgow offices of the Press Association. Ukrainian and Argentine organisations also claimed responsibility for the device, but police reportedly discounted these claims.
- 16 March: Another letter bomb addressed to Thatcher was suspected to be the work of the SNLA, after the group sent a letter to the Press Association, stating they would take action “within 24 hours” in response to the closure of a Scottish steel works. The bomb was discovered at a post office in Victoria and was defused.
- April: The SNLA claimed to have planted an explosive device under the stage of Perth City Hall, where then-prime minister Margaret Thatcher was due to launch a renewed campaign in the lead-up to the 1983 United Kingdom general election. While police declined to comment on these claims at the time, citing it as a “security matter”, a later BBC Scotland news report stated that the alleged plot had been discovered and foiled.
- 5 April: The SNLA claimed responsibility for a letter bomb that was discovered and defused at a British Army careers office in Penge.
- 15 April: Following a letter from the group claiming responsibility for attacks at unspecified targets, the group was thought to have been responsible for a letter bomb that was discovered and defused at a hotel in South Mimms, where Thatcher was due to attend a Conservative Party Conference.
- May: SNLA members used a rubber dinghy to cross Loch Long and placed two inert devices beneath culverts on the main access road to RNAD Coulport. The area was sealed off during a major security alert before both devices were destroyed in controlled explosions.
- 12 May: Group member David Dinsmore was suspected of sending an incendiary device to the Earl of Mansfield at Scone Palace in Perth, where Thatcher was due to visit. Dinsmore later fled to Dublin to escape prosecution.
- 4 June: The SNLA claimed to have sent a letter bomb addressed to Conservative Party chairman Cecil Parkinson at the Conservative Party HQ, which ignited after being opened by Parkinson's secretary; there were no injuries.
- 29 June: The SNLA claimed responsibility for a letter-bomb addressed to then-Home Secretary Leon Brittan, which was defused by Scotland Yard.
- 20 August: The SNLA claimed a letter bomb that was posted to the manager of Cardowan Colliery, which failed to go off. The group claimed the device was sent following the decision by the National Coal Board to close down the colliery.
- 25 August: SNLA founder Adam Busby was suspected of painting anti-British slogans such as “Free Scotland” and “Brits out” on a Royal Navy lorry in Berwick-upon-Tweed. He later fled to Dublin with fellow SNLA member David Dinsmore to avoid criminal charges. In October 1984, a Dublin court ruled that Busby's actions were “political,” allowing him to avoid extradition to the United Kingdom.
- 8 September:The SNLA was thought to have been responsible for a letter bomb sent to the House of Commons, addressed to then-Secretary of State for Employment Norman Tebbit, which bore the initials 'SNLA'. The package ignited after being opened by a civil servant, but no injuries were reported.
- 8 September: The SNLA was suspected for the responsibility of a letter-bomb sent to then-Secretary of State for Scotland George Younger, which did not ignite.
- 1 October: Another explosive package addressed to Norman Tebbit was recovered from a post box in Glasgow and defused. SNLA member Thomas Kelly was later arrested and jailed for 10 years in January 1984, after admitting responsibility for making the device, along with another he had intended to send to Tebbit.
- 26 October: A letter bomb claimed by the group which was addressed to then-Employment Secretary Tom King at the House of Commons was intercepted in Glasgow.
- 7 November: The SNLA claimed responsibility for a further attack on the Kelvingrove Conservative Party offices after inflammable material was discovered outside the building. No injuries were reported.
- 2 December: The SNLA were suspected of involvement in a letter bomb addressed to then-Defence Secretary Michael Heseltine, which partially exploded in the Ministry of Defence Headquarters in London; no major injuries were reported. A Scotland Yard spokesperson stated that the device was being linked to similar packages previously sent by the group.
- 11 December: An anonymous caller phoned the Press Association claiming the SNLA was responsible for a bomb that exploded at the Royal Artillery Barracks in Woolwich, causing injury to four soldiers, and a passerby. This attack was later claimed by the Provisional Irish Republican Army (IRA).

=== 1984 ===
- 2 June: The SNLA claimed to have carried out an unsuccessful incendiary attack at then-Glasgow Hillhead Social Democratic Party (SDP) MP Roy Jenkins' home.
- 30 November: The SNLA claimed responsibility for another letter bomb addressed to Thatcher, which had been defused in a Nine Elms post office.

=== 1985 ===
- 27 April: The SNLA claimed to have planted an incendiary device in the basement of the Ministry of Defence Headquarters, which caused the building to sustain serious damage from a six-hour long fire.

=== 1986 ===
- 18 April: The SNLA claimed responsibility for a letter bomb sent to then-Scottish Secretary Malcolm Rifkind, which was discovered at the House of Commons and subsequently defused.
- 22 April: A letter bomb claimed by the SNLA was posted to the British Steel HQ, which the group claimed was a response to the closure of a Gartcosh steel works. The bomb was later defused.
- 24 April: The SNLA claimed responsibility for a bomb that exploded outside a British Airways office on Oxford Street, which was also claimed by English terrorist group The Angry Brigade. Both claims were subsequently dismissed by police.
- 16 July: A purported body within the SNLA calling itself the “Willie McRae commando” claimed responsibility for a letter bomb sent to then-Home Secretary Douglas Hurd, which ignited after being opened by a security staff member, who was unharmed.

=== 1989 ===
- 13 May: The SNLA claimed responsibility for an explosion that occurred at the Glensanda Quarry in Morvern, Argyll, which the group alleged was to be used for dumping nuclear waste. The explosion was later ruled to be accidental, and claims of the site being used for dumping nuclear waste were later denied.

== 1990s ==
=== 1991 ===
- 27 June: The SNLA claimed to have planted an 11lb bomb on the grounds of Holyrood Palace, allegedly intended to kill Queen Elizabeth II, who was scheduled to visit the following day. The group stated that the operation failed because its members were spotted by security personnel. However, police discounted claims of any unauthorised access to the grounds, and no explosive device was found. The claim was made by organisation founder Adam Busby in a statement to the Sunday Mail on 15 December 1991.

=== 1992 ===
- 25 December: The SNLA claimed that one of its units had entered and searched the Dublin home of Garda Special Branch officer Michael Hughes, removing documents, photographs, and other materials.

=== 1993 ===
- 17 March: Hoax mortar devices were reportedly found outside Aberdeen-based oil offices, which were subsequently destroyed. In December, Andrew McIntosh, an oil worker who also claimed to be a “cell commander” of the SNLA, claimed responsibility for the devices, in which he admitted to have been “privy to their making”.
- 22 March: A letter bomb was discovered and defused at the Scottish Office in Edinburgh, allegedly in protest to privatisation of Scottish water. McIntosh also admitted responsibility for this in December.
- 23 March: A letter bomb exploded in the Anglian Water headquarters in Huntingdon, Cambridgeshire after being opened by an 18 year old worker, who was unharmed. McIntosh was also found guilty in connection with this device.
- 23 March: Another letter-bomb, also found to have been made and sent by McIntosh, was discovered at the Dounreay nuclear plant in Caithness and made safe by a bomb disposal team.
- 10 May: Packages containing hoax time bombs were reportedly planted in various postboxes in Dundee, Edinburgh, and Glasgow. Busby claimed the SNLA had been responsible for these devices in an interview with The Scotsman in December 1993.
- 28 August: Andrew McIntosh was arrested after a dawn police search of his Aberdeen home uncovered firearms, ammunition, prohibited weapons, and bomb-making materials. He was later charged with firearms offences and conspiring to further the aims of the SNLA.
- November: The SNLA claimed it plotted to free Andrew McIntosh from Craiginches Prison prior to his trial. According to a dossier attributed to SNLA founder Adam Busby and provided to the Press and Journal, a series of bomb hoax calls were made, including one on 5 November that caused major disruption in Aberdeen. Police searches in several areas found no devices. McIntosh was later convicted of conspiring to further the aims of the SNLA, along with firearms and explosives offences, and was sentenced to 12 years’ imprisonment.

=== 1994 ===
- 28 February: The Exchange and Mart headquarters in Dorset was evacuated following a hoax bomb threat claimed by the SNLA.
- March: A series of hoax letter bombs, death threats, and menacing phone calls were sent to Scottish unionist politicians under the name “Flame.” Targets included then-Scottish Conservatives chairman Michael Hirst, Ayr Conservative MP Phil Gallie, and Scottish Shadow Secretary George Robertson. Police reportedly suspected the involvement of associates of Andrew McIntosh. It was later reported that the campaign was orchestrated by the SNLA.
- April: A letter bomb was sent to Dr. Malcolm Dickson, an academic who was working at Strathclyde University at the time. The device was attributed to the SNLA, allegedly in response to Dickson's research refuting claims of Anglicisation in Scotland. Dickson was unharmed in the incident.
- 11 April: A hoax letter bomb was sent to Woodhill House in Aberdeen, which served as the former headquarters for Grampian Regional Council. An Inverurie man, Kevin Paton, was later convicted for the act, which was reportedly carried out in furtherance of the SNLA's aims.
- 25 July: The SNLA were suspected to have been responsible for a bomb threat against the Scottish National Party (SNP) headquarters in Edinburgh, which prompted an evacuation.
- 28 July: The SNLA were suspected for being responsible for death threats sent to newspapers against then-SNP leaders Alex Salmond and Gordon Wilson.
- August: The SNLA claimed responsibility for a firebomb attack on Stonehaven courthouse that caused significant damage. Grampian Police, however, said they did not believe the group was responsible.
- 8 September: A hoax explosive device was placed outside Aberdeen Sheriff Court. Two men, Terence Webber and Darren Brown were later charged in connection with the incident. The Aberdeen Sheriff Court described the actions, along with Paton's hoax bomb delivery in April, as being intended to further the aims of the SNLA or a similar organisation. Both Paton and Webber were jailed for four years in August 1995.
- Mid-December: The SNLA were suspected of being responsible for the delivery of a threatening message, which read “leave Scotland or die,” accompanied by a maritime flare, to English-born Scottish Labour MP for Greenock and Port Glasgow Norman Godman.
- 28 December: An anonymous man claiming to be a member of the SNLA reportedly made a threatening phone call to Peterculter councillor John Stephenson. An enquiry by Grampian Police was launched following the threat.

=== 1995 ===
- January: Highland Regional Councillor Michael Foxley and Eigg landowner Keith Schellenberg reportedly received threatening phone calls from individuals claiming to represent the SNLA. Both men were given police protection following the threats.
- 5 January: Adam Busby sent fax messages to several media organisations purporting to be an SNLA “headquarters communiqué”, threatening an escalation of attacks against what were described as “English colonists” in Scotland. He was later convicted in March 1997 of sending menacing messages and sentenced to two years’ imprisonment.
- 30 January: An investigation was launched into the SNLA, after the group claimed to have obtained telephone numbers of political figures, police officers, and military personnel, including then-Scottish Secretary Ian Lang, which the group further claimed was used to send a death threat to him via phone call.
- February: The SNLA where suspected to be behind a hoax bomb threat targeting Labour MP Brian Wilson’s office in Kilbirnie, which was phoned to the Samaritans in Greenock, prompting street closures and traffic diversions.
- March: Several shopping centres in Birmingham were evacuated by police after bomb threats were made by the SNLA.
- 10 March: The SNLA claimed to have sent a total of six explosive devices, three of which were reportedly sent to then-Labour Party headquarters John Smith House, future PM Tony Blair's house in County Durham, and another to a Labour Party conference that was scheduled to take place at Eden Court Theatre in Inverness. No injures were reported.
- 11 March: The SNLA claimed in a statement to the Press Association that three additional letter bombs were in the post and due to be delivered to Labour Party offices in Glasgow and London. Police advised staff to leave incoming mail unopened while it was examined; no further devices were found.
- 19 March: Adam Busby claimed the SNLA would carry out attacks targeting the Scottish local elections scheduled to be held on 6 April 1995.
- 22 March: A bomb threat was made against the Kessock Bridge in Inverness, causing a two-hour closure. The caller used a code word previously associated with the SNLA. In May 1999, Hugh Smith McMahon, who was under Garda surveillance in Dublin due to suspected links with the SNLA, admitted to making the call. He was given a two-year suspended sentence by Ireland's Special Criminal Court.
- May: The SNLA claimed to have planted a fake bomb on a British Airways flight heading to London from Belfast, which prompted an investigation by police. The group had previously issued bomb threats against passenger aircraft in April, prompting heightened security measures at Scottish airports. Both City of London Police and the Royal Ulster Constabulary declined to comment on the incident.
- August: The United States Embassy in London and American broadcasters, including NBC and ABC, received threatening communications relating to alleged incendiary bomb attacks against aircraft in the UK and the US. An inert device was sent to the embassy, and the SNLA claimed responsibility.
- 23 September: The SNLA were suspected to be behind a suspicious parcel that was delivered to the Scottish Labour Party headquarters in Glasgow, addressed to Scottish Shadow Secretary George Robertson. The package contained silver-coloured metal fragments and a threatening message warning Robertson to “stop making trouble, or you’re dead.” The Royal Navy bomb squad determined the device to be a hoax.
- October: Former members and supporters of the SNLA form an offshoot group, the Scottish Separatist Group (SSG), with the aim of stopping “mass English immigration” into Scotland. The SSG would later be described as the SNLA's “political wing”.
- 15 November: A further suspicious package addressed to George Robertson was intercepted at Glasgow's St Rollox sorting office before reaching Scottish Labour Party headquarters at Keir Hardie House. Though no group claimed responsibility for the device, the Hamilton Advertiser reported that suspicions were that it was the work of the SNLA.

=== 1996 ===
- 15 November: A bomb hoax call suspected to have been made by the SNLA caused an evacuation of Glasgow's city centre and disruption to train services at Glasgow Central station. The caller used a recognised code word and claimed a device had been planted under a bridge on Argyle Street. The hoax coincided with the ceremonial return of the Stone of Scone to Scotland, which was also delayed due to a separate suspicious package found at Coldstream Bridge.

=== 1997 ===
- March: Whilst serving a sentence in HMP Shotts for assault in 1996, a man named Andrew Paterson sent letters containing renewed death threats to Scottish Shadow Secretary George Robertson and two other MPs. In the letters, Paterson claimed to be a member of the SNLA's “Willie McRae Battalion.” Paterson was given a three-month sentence for these offences in October 1998 by the Perth Sheriff Court.

== 2000s–2014 ==
=== 2000 ===
- June: Police investigated an extremist anti-English email sent to several Members of the Scottish Parliament which falsely purported to be from then-First minister of Scotland Donald Dewar. The message carried the acronym 'SNLA' and was linked to a website claiming to collect personal data on English immigrants in Scotland.
- 7 August: The SNLA reportedly sent over 1000 emails with anti-English messages to the Northern Constabulary headquarters in Inverness, in an apparent attempt to crash their computer system. A spokeswoman for the Constabulary stated that the incident had no impact on police operations.
- 23 December: An anonymous man claiming to represent the SNLA phoned a Glasgow-based Sunday newspaper, claiming a bomb had been delivered to Skibo Castle in Dornoch, where American singer Madonna and English filmmaker Guy Ritchie held their wedding. The caller claimed the device was due to detonate at around 12:30 p.m. Police contacted security at the venue, who confirmed that no breach was detected and no device was found.

=== 2001 ===
- August: The SNLA were suspected to have been responsible for hoax packages containing anthrax delivered to the University of St Andrews, where Prince William was due to study. The group later claimed responsibility for the packages.

=== 2002 ===
- March: An anonymous man claiming links with the SNLA made a call to Scotland Yard claiming responsibility for the delivery of 16 packages that were labelled as containing aromatherapy oil, but were later discovered to contain caustic acid. The packages were reportedly sent to various political figures including then-North East Scotland MSP Mike Rumbles' assistant, and then-PM Tony Blair's wife Cherie at 10 Downing Street. A 17-year-old teenager from Dumbarton later plead guilty to involvement with these deliveries in January 2003.

=== 2004 ===
- 9 October: Andrew McIntosh was rearrested near the Forth Road Bridge as part of a major anti-terrorism operation ahead of the Queen's opening of the new Scottish Parliament building. Police searched McIntosh's car, along with his Aberdeen-based flat, where they found firearms and bomb-making materials. He was charged with firearms and explosive substances offences and died by suicide on 18 October, hours before a scheduled Aberdeen Sheriff Court appearance.

=== 2006 ===
- 8–15 May: Adam Busby sent two emails, purportedly from the SNLA, to the British Airports Authority falsely claiming that bombs had been placed aboard transatlantic flights bound for New York.
- September: The SNLA was reportedly being investigated by police after it was reported that the group sent an email to the Glasgow offices of The Sunday Times threatening to poison English water supplies. In addition, and investigation was carried out by the Home Office after the SSG reportedly published instructions on how to poison water supplies in England.
- 25 December: The SNLA claimed that it had contaminated liquid products in two shopping centres in Manchester.
- 28 December: The SNLA claimed that lotions and other products laced with sodium hydroxide had been placed on shelves in the Metrocentre near Newcastle.

=== 2007 ===
- April: Two packages containing miniature bottles of vodka filled with caustic soda were delivered to then-Blackburn with Darwen councillor John Wright, and former Scottish Daily Express journalist Myra Philp. One of the packages also contained a letter, signed 'SNLA', threatening to kill English people “at random”, and to poison water supplies in England. Two Manchester men were later jailed for six years in January 2008 for their connections to the deliveries.
- May: Adam Busby was accused of telephoning the Northern Constabulary and falsely claiming that a bomb had been planted beneath the Kessock Bridge.

=== 2009 ===
- March: Adam Busby's son, Adam Busby Jr. reportedly sent six packages containing shotgun cartridges accompanied by intimidating notes to figures including Mike Rumbles, then-First minister of Scotland Alex Salmond, and the Glasgow City Council headquarters. He was later jailed for six years in June after admitting the offences in court.

=== 2012 ===
- 19 January: The group formally announced a ceasefire in a letter sent to media outlets ahead of the 2014 Scottish independence referendum, stating that they hoped independence would be achieved “peacefully and democratically”.

=== 2014 ===
- 2 July: Police Scotland investigated a bomb threat made against a Better Together campaign office in Cumbernauld. The Daily Record reported that the individual responsible claimed to be acting on behalf of the SNLA.
