= George Crichton =

George Crichton may refer to:

- George Crichton (bishop), keeper of the Privy Seal of Scotland and bishop of Dunkeld
- George Crichton, 1st Earl of Caithness, Lord High Admiral of Scotland
- Sir George Crichton (courtier), English courtier and Army officer
