= George Crichton (bishop) =

George Crichton or Crichtoun served as Abbot of Holyrood Abbey then as the Bishop of Dunkeld until his death on 24 January 1543.

He was abbot of Holyrood Abbey in Edinburgh from at least 1515, succeeding Robert Bellenden. In Edinburgh, he founded the hospital of St Thomas, close to the Water Gate on the Royal Mile. He served as Keeper of the Privy Seal of Scotland from 1519. He moved from Holyrood Abbey to Dunkeld Abbey in 1528.

He was the person to whom the Dunkeld Lectern was presented by Pope Alexander VI around 1530. He it turn presented to Holyrood Abbey, from whence it was looted by Sir Richard Lee during an English attack on Edinburgh in 1544. It was buried in St Albans during the English Civil War and rediscovered in 1750. He is not remembered as an especially pious Bishop, and it has been said of him "He is said to have thanked God that he knew neither New nor Old Testaments".

He is believed to be the uncle of Robert Crichton, who served as the last known medieval Bishop of Dunkeld until 1554.

Political offices
Preceded by George, Abbot of Holyrood	Keeper of the Privy Seal of Scotland; 1526–unknown	Succeeded by Robert Colvill
Religious titles
Preceded by Robert Cockburn	Bishop of Dunkeld; 1526 to 1544	Succeeded by Robert Crichton
