= Scottish National Liberation Army =

Scottish nationalist paramilitary organisation

- Other name: Tartan Terrorists
- Founder: Adam Busby
- Dates active: 1980–present (on ceasefire since 2012)
- Country: Scotland
- Ideology: Scottish nationalism Scottish independence

The Scottish National Liberation Army (SNLA), often nicknamed the Tartan Terrorists, is a Scottish nationalist paramilitary group which aims to bring about Scottish independence from the United Kingdom. The group was founded in 1980 by Adam Busby, a former soldier from Paisley, after the 1979 Scottish devolution referendum, which the organisation claims was fixed. The group's activities primarily involved sending letter bombs to UK government officials, carrying out arson attacks, and making numerous hoax threats of violence, before declaring a ceasefire in 2012, to allow debates leading up to the 2014 Scottish independence referendum to take place.

== History ==
=== Formation ===
The SNLA was founded in 1980 by Adam Busby, a former soldier who served in the Argyll and Sutherland Highlanders. Busby was also a founding member of the Scottish Republican Socialist Party, and a former member of the Scottish National Party (SNP), having joined the Dumbarton chapter on his 16th birthday. The SNLA was formed in the wake of the 1979 Scottish devolution referendum. This referendum had resulted in a majority of voters (51.6%) supporting the establishment of a devolved parliament in Scotland, but as there was only a 64% voter turnout, the Yes vote represented only 32.9% of registered voters. This did not meet the requirement for at least 40% of voters voting in favour, per the Scotland Act 1978, so the devolved parliament was not established. Busby felt that this outcome called for a more forceful approach towards achieving independence, on the grounds that there was "no constitutional way forward".

=== Activity ===
==== 1980s ====
The first wave of actions attributed to the group emerged on 1 March 1982, in which several bomb threats were made in Edinburgh, though the group did not claim responsibility until a letter was sent to the Press Association in November. On 17 March, a letter bomb was sent to the House of Commons addressed to John Nott, the then-Secretary of State for Defence. A man had telephoned the Glasgow offices of The Scotsman, claiming that a bomb had been sent to Nott by the SNLA in response to the newly announced changes to the UK's Trident programme. The bomb subsequently arrived at the House of Commons on 17 March, and was reported after being discovered by a Ministry of Defence member. The device was initially thought by the media to have been the work of Irish republican paramilitaries, such as the Provisional Irish Republican Army (IRA), as it coincidentally arrived at the commons on St. Patrick's Day. To coincide with the 1982 Glasgow Hillhead by-election the following week, two further letter bombs were sent to two separate Scottish Social Democratic Party offices in Edinburgh and Glasgow; both devices were subsequently defused by the authorities upon discovery by office staff. The group later claimed responsibility for a letter bomb that was posted to Queen Elizabeth II at Buckingham Palace, along with two further letter bombs sent to Conservative party offices in Edinburgh and London, and an incendiary device that was reportedly planted in the Scottish Assembly building. Scotland Yard claimed no such device had arrived at Buckingham Palace, and purported that the London Conservative Party office had been sent a hoax package, not a letter bomb. On 8 November, the SNLA claimed responsibility for a firebomb attack at a Conservative Party office in Glasgow. On 24 November, the Glasgow offices of the Press Association reported that it had received a written letter from the group, claiming responsibility for a letter bomb that was sent to then-Secretary of State for Industry Patrick Jenkin, stating, "SNLA will avenge the workers in Craigneuk." This was a response to a proposal made by the British Steel Corporation to partially close a steel mill in Craigneuk, North Lanarkshire, costing 427 jobs. The letter bomb was discovered by Jenkin's secretary, and was later defused by police. A spokesman for Scotland Yard said, "There is no doubt this could have killed someone. It was similar to others sent to politicians in the past." Following this incident, security was tightened for an upcoming visit to Edinburgh from then-prime minister Margaret Thatcher, who was due to attend a private dinner taking place in the Assembly Rooms in celebration of the centenary of the Scottish Conservatives.

In 1983, the group reportedly carried out 27 attacks, which primarily involved sending letter bombs to public figures including Diana, Princess of Wales, and Margaret Thatcher. In February the group sent a letter bomb to then-Lord Provost of Glasgow Michael Kelly at the Glasgow City Chambers, where Diana was due to visit. The letter ignited after being opened by Kelly's secretary, Eric Hamilton. Hamilton sustained only minor injuries and rejected hospital treatment, opting instead to join Kelly in welcoming Diana. In April, another letter bomb was sent by the group to a hotel located in South Mimms, where Thatcher was due to attend a Conservative Party Conference. The device was discovered by Salisbury MP candidate Robert Key, who called the police, leading to the device's defusal. A spokesman for Scotland Yard claimed the device could not have detonated, stating: "The incendiary device was contained in a small jiffy bag. It consisted of lighter fuel." The SNLA also sent a letter to the London offices of the Press Association, claiming responsibility for the device sent to the hotel, stating it was "in retaliation for cuts in Scots industry." In June, the group posted a letter bomb to the Conservative Central Office, addressed to then-Conservative Party chairman Cecil Parkinson. The letter partially ignited after being opened by his secretary, who was unharmed. The group claimed responsibility in a Glasgow-postmarked letter sent to the Press Association, which stated "Scottish National Liberation Army claims the London letter bomb attacks of 3–4 June." A spokesperson for Scotland Yard described the device as "a viable device containing substances which could ignite and cause serious injury." In response to the incident, Commander William Hucklesby, the then-head of Scotland Yard's anti-terror branch subsequently issued a warning to mail workers to be vigilant of any suspicious packages. In August, a letter bomb was sent by the group to the manager of Cardowan Colliery; the device did not explode. The day before, the group sent a letter to the Press Association which stated "SNLA attacks on 19/20. No more cuts," in response to a decision made by the National Coal Board to close the colliery. In September, another letter bomb was sent to then-Secretary of State for Employment Norman Tebbit, which ignited after being opened in the Westminster offices of the Department of Employment by a 19-year-old civil servant. The device contained a written letter, which although largely destroyed by the explosion, was found to bear 'SNLA' on the remains. The same day, a letter bomb was posted to then-Secretary of State for Scotland George Younger, which failed to ignite. Around this time, Busby, along with another organisation member, David Dinsmore, fled to Dublin to evade prosecution for conspiracy against the UK government, with Busby facing further charges for scrawling anti-British slogans on a Royal Navy truck in Berwick-upon-Tweed. Shortly afterwards, Dinsmore was reportedly facing a criminal charge for sending a letter bomb to the Earl of Mansfield at Scone Palace in Perth. Following Busby and Dinsmore's retreat, a separate cell for the organisation was set up in Dublin, which continued to exist for over 20 years. In October, the group claimed responsibility for another letter bomb addressed to then-Employment Secretary Tom King at the House of Commons, which had been intercepted in Glasgow. The group sent a note to the Press Association claiming responsibility for the device, warning that "SNLA attacks take place now. More will follow." Special Branch officers described the device as "crude, but viable." In December, an anonymous caller claiming to represent the group phoned the Press Association claiming the group was responsible for an explosion that occurred at the Royal Artillery Barracks in Woolwich, South East London on 11 December, which injured four soldiers, along with a bystander, stating "more will follow". Scotland Yard were sceptical of this claim, however, and believed the attack was more likely to have been carried out by the Provisional Irish Republican Army (IRA), as the scale of the attack did not match previous attacks carried out by the SNLA, and also due to Thomas Quigley, who was actively involved in simultaneous attacks carried out by the Provisional IRA, being charged with conspiracy to carry out bomb attacks in England the previous week. In October, the SNLA had sent a letter to police stating their intention to carry out a mass bombing campaign in London along with other major towns and cities throughout England. The IRA initially did not claim responsibility for the bombing, and Scotland Yard believed that the SNLA were behind the attack, however, a spokesman for the IRA later claimed the group were responsible for the attack, and no involvement from the SNLA was mentioned. Following this attack, it was determined that the SNLA may have had links to the Irish National Liberation Army (INLA), who threatened to carry out a similar bombing campaign around the same time. Under the orders of Commander William Hucklesby, police in London were instructed to prepare for the possibility a dual threat of bomb attacks from both groups over the Christmas period.

Also in 1983, the group claimed to have planted a plastic explosive under the stage in Perth City Hall, allegedly intending to assassinate Thatcher, who was scheduled to attend a Conservative party conference being held in the building, and launch a renewed campaign for the upcoming general election. An anonymous caller phoned a news agency claiming the group had "planted a six-pound plastic explosive and sealed it in a veterinary medical chest under the City Hall stage," along with claims that the bomb had remained undetected for 25 days, only being discovered 48 hours before the conference, and that it was set to be detonated remotely. In response to the claims, Tayside Police declined to confirm or deny the incident, stating: "We cannot comment on this, it is a security matter." In January 1984, group member Thomas Kelly was jailed for ten years after pleading guilty to making and delivering explosive packages; one such device, which was again addressed to Tebbit, was recovered from a post box in Ingram Street, Glasgow. Kelly's arrest and conviction were brought about after an undercover Special Branch agent volunteered to inform the police on the SNLA's activities, fearing that the Scottish nationalist movement would turn violent. The agent also reportedly held conversations with Kelly at his home, which had been bugged, allowing detectives to listen in. In October 1984, Busby successfully avoided extradition back to the United Kingdom to face criminal charges for the vandalisation of a Naval lorry in August 1983, after a Dublin court ruled that Busby's actions were "political." On 30th November (St. Andrew's Day), the group claimed responsibility for the delivery of another letter bomb to Thatcher, which was defused after being discovered in a post office in Nine Elms, South West London. Scotland Yard described the device as "viable", and that it could have resulted in serious injury had it been opened. In 1985 the following year, the group claimed responsibility for an incendiary attack that occurred at the Ministry of Defence Headquarters in Whitehall, London. The attack was carried out by planting a miniature device in an empty fifth-floor sub basement inside the building; the fire lasted for more than six hours and caused serious structural damage, estimated at around £700,000.

On 19 April 1986, the group claimed responsibility for a letter bomb that was discovered in the House of Commons, addressed to then-Scottish Secretary Malcolm Rifkind. The device was defused by police after being alerted by a Commons sorting office staff member, who discovered the device. Although the device was described as "crude", a spokesman for Scotland Yard stated the device "would have caused severe burning to the hands if it had gone off". On 22 April the following week, another letter bomb claimed by the group was discovered and defused at the British Steel Headquarters. The group claimed the device was sent to British Steel in response to the closure of a Gartcosh steel works, which resulted in 700 job losses. Two days later on 24 April, the group phoned the Press Association following a bombing that occurred at a British Airways office in Oxford Street, London, claiming responsibility for the attack. The caller provided detailed information on how the bomb was constructed, and claimed that British Airways was targeted in response to an attempt by the UK government to completely privatize the company, which the group believed would result in significant job losses, along with total withdrawal of airline services in remote areas of Scotland. However, despite this claim, the media did not explicitly name who was claiming to be responsible for the bombing, until the following day when the issue was brought up in the House of Commons by Giles Shaw, who acknowledged calls received by the Press Association from the SNLA, along with English terrorist group the Angry Brigade, who claimed responsibility for the bombing "in retaliation for Britain's involvement in the American bombing of Libya." An investigation carried out by the Metropolitan Police anti-terrorist branch found no evidence that the bombing was linked to Libya, and both claims from the SNLA and the Angry Brigade were later discounted by police. In July, the group claimed responsibility for a letter bomb posted to then-Home Secretary Douglas Hurd, which ignited after being opened by Home Office security staff. An anonymous caller phoned the Scotsman on behalf of the organisation claiming the delivery was made by an alleged body within the SNLA called the "Willie McRae Commando". The device was also described as "crude and amateur" by police, and no major injuries were reported.

No further activity was claimed by the group since the letter bomb sent to Hurd, until May 1989, when a huge explosion, followed by a blaze was reported at the Glensanda Quarry in Morvern, near Oban, Argyll. The local coastguard had alerted the local emergency services after residents in the surrounding areas reported hearing a loud explosion accompanied by a large cloud of black smoke on the opposite end of Loch Linnhe, where the Quarry was located. The group phoned the Press Association hours after the blaze, claiming that the group had carried out an attack on the site, and stated that the site was targeted allegedly due to the site being used for "disposal of civilian and nuclear waste". Despite this claim, police and fire experts concluded that the fire was accidental, reportedly due a rubber conveyor belt catching fire, and many reports on the incident left out the claim of responsibility from the SNLA. Reporters also ruled out any possibility of the incident being an attack, as the Quarry was inaccessible by road, and that workers were transported to the plant directly from Oban on company boats. Claims of the site being redeveloped as a dump for nuclear waste were subsequently denied by nuclear industry officials.

==== 1990s ====
In December 1991, the Sunday Mail had received claims from the SNLA that the group had planted a bomb on the grounds of Holyrood Palace in a renewed attempt to assassinate the Queen. The group claimed to have broken into the grounds of the palace armed with 11lbs of explosives on the night of 27 June, where Anne, Princess Royal was sleeping, with the Queen due to arrive the following day. The paper had also claimed that two masked men had been seen climbing over the perimeter wall, wearing communication devices and armed with handguns, followed by two other similarly armed men, who allegedly delivered explosive devices intended to be planted in a hole dug in the grounds of the palace, close to where a garden party was scheduled to take place. The paper further claimed that the four men fled the premises after being spotted by security staff. However, Lothian and Borders Police, while acknowledging that an alarm had gone off at the palace, discounted these claims, claiming that no one had been spotted on the grounds, and no member of the royal family was in any danger. The claims to the Sunday Mail also contained an interview with Busby, who didn't personally take part in the operation, in which he reportedly stated: "The well-planned and audacious assault on Holyrood Palace failed only because of sheer bad luck. Encouraged by the near-success of this operation, which was a serious threat to the lives of English royalty, the SNLA pledges itself to continue these attacks."

In 1993, another group member, Andrew McIntosh was sentenced to 12 years in prison after being linked to a conspiracy by the SNLA to coerce the UK government into establishing an independent government in Scotland, along with illegal possession of a Kalashnikov rifle, a sawn-off shotgun and a pistol. The High Court in Aberdeen heard that McIntosh had orchestrated a three-month campaign of fear tactics, which involved placing hoax explosives outside Aberdeen-based oil industry buildings and mailing genuine letter bombs to Dounreay nuclear plant in Caithness, the Scottish Office in Edinburgh, and the headquarters of Anglian Water in Huntingdon, located in the constituency of then-prime minister John Major. McIntosh was arrested on 28 August following a police search of his home, in which a firearms certificate covering the possession of a .22 pistol, a 9mm Browning, and a revolver was discovered, along with a semi-automatic rifle, and a Walther P22, which were not covered by the certificate. When questioned by Grampian Police about the hoax explosive devices placed outside oil industry offices following his arrest, which McIntosh allegedly admitted to have been "privy to their making," McIntosh claimed "Scotland's oil is being stolen - that's why we targeted those companies." When asked about the letter bombs, McIntosh stated "Dounreay is a dumping ground for nuclear waste. The Scottish Office are collaborators. Huntingdon are basically thieves stealing our resources." McIntosh was found to have been linked to the SNLA after he told detectives "I am a volunteer soldier with the SNLA. I am a cell commander. The actions we have taken are directed at those people who are actively working against the interests of Scotland. Whatever I did, I did in the line of duty." During the trial, bomb experts told the court that the hoax devices planted by McIntosh were crafted in such a way that they were thought to have been real at first, with one expert describing them as "the best hoax bombs seen in Great Britain." McIntosh was also found to have been a former member of Scottish ultranationalist group Siol nan Gaidheal, which he had briefly joined in 1992 after being disillusioned with the Scottish National Party (SNP). He was later expelled from the group after a few months following a leadership clash. Following McIntosh's conviction, the SNLA sent a communiqué stating its intent to continue their armed campaign, the letter, reportedly sent from Busby's Dublin home, also contained a poster featuring a hooded gunman alongside the words "Free Andy McIntosh". After serving six years, McIntosh was released in 1999. He was rearrested for firearms possession on 9 October 2004, the same day Queen Elizabeth II appeared at the opening ceremony of the newly completed Scottish Parliament Building, and committed suicide whilst in custody on 18 October, just hours before he was due to reappear in the Aberdeen Sheriff Court for his offences.

In 1994, a renewed attempt to extradite Busby to Scotland was made after Grampian Police issued a fresh warrant following a hoax bomb threat against Aberdeen Sheriff Court. In January 1995, the SNLA reportedly claimed to have accessed confidential British Telecom customer files, including the home number of then-Scottish Secretary Ian Lang. A caller from Dublin contacted the Press Association and stated that Lang’s number had been used to issue a death threat against him. The caller also claimed to be in possession of unlisted and confidential numbers belonging to Cabinet ministers, senior police officers, and military personnel. British Telecom confirmed it was assisting police with inquiries, and Strathclyde Police opened an investigation. In March, further explosive devices were posted to various Labour Party figures, in which a device was posted to a venue in Inverness, where a Scottish Labour Party conference was taking place, along with other devices which were sent to the County Durham home of then-Leader of the Opposition, and future prime minister Tony Blair, future Secretary of State for Defence George Robertson, and to the then-headquarters of the Labour Party, John Smith House in Southwark, London. Several shopping centers in Birmingham were also evacuated as a result of bomb threats made by the group. In April, numerous airports in Scotland were on high alert after the group threatened to carry out bomb attacks on aircraft if demands made by the group were not met by 18 May, which included imposing a ban on "English immigration". The group also claimed to have developed a new type of letter bomb that was designed evade detection systems and detonate inside aircraft cargo units upon reaching a certain height. The following month, the group was reportedly being investigated by police after it was claimed that the group had planted a fake bomb on a British Airways flight heading from Belfast to London. The device, which had its battery removed prior to delivery, was allegedly sent by the group to show that it was capable of causing devastation to British air transportation. Upon investigation, a spokeswoman for British Airways commented "We have had a report on the incident and have been assured there was no risk to the aircraft." Further enquiries surrounding the incident were subsequently referred to police, where a spokesman for City of London Police, despite open claims from the SNLA, said they were unable to determine if the incident had actually taken place or not, and a spokesman for the Royal Ulster Constabulary declined to comment on the group's claim. In August, two men, Kevin Paton and Terrence Webber, were jailed for four years for involvement in the group's March activities. Webber had previously made a claim to Scottish Sun journalist Alan Muir that the group "wanted Scotland to be free, to be a nation on its own, without the shackles of England and without the English being here, having our jobs".

In May 1996, Busby's extradition warrant was dropped by the Crown Office following an arrest by Dublin police on terrorism-related charges. On 22 May, Busby appeared before Dublin's Special Criminal Court, where he was accused of possessing letter bombs addressed to then-Labour leader Tony Blair and Shadow Scottish Secretary George Robertson. He was further charged with sending intimidating messages to various newspapers, including The Herald. Busby remained remanded in custody until October 1996. Busby was denied bail by the Special Criminal Court after police expressed concerns that he would flee if released. Detective Inspector Peter Maguire, who objected to the bail application, stated that Busby posed a risk of interfering with or intimidating witnesses, and described Busby’s activities as "threats and intimidation to English people living in Scotland and to people in political life in the UK." Busby's trial had been scheduled to take place in October 1996, but was postponed due to delays within the Irish court system. In March 1997, Busby was sentenced to two years in prison for sending threats of violence by fax to the Daily Record, and the Press Association news agency. The threats reportedly contained a hit list of intended targets, which included English-born MP for Clydebank and Milngavie Tony Worthington, along with threats of petrol bomb attacks against "English colonists" in Scotland. Busby was later released from prison in November 1997. In May 1999, another Dublin-based organisation member, Hugh Smith McMahon, was given a two-year suspended prison sentence for making a hoax telephone claim that he had planted an explosive device on the Kessock Bridge in Inverness. In July 1999, Busby was rearrested after being linked to a blackmail plot to commit mass murder by contaminating English and Welsh water supplies with weedkiller unless British troops were withdrawn from Northern Ireland. The arrest was made after a month-long joint investigation was carried out by Scotland Yard and the Gardaí after letters were sent to senior figures, including then-prime minister Tony Blair, demanding a "total British military and political withdrawal" from Northern Ireland by June 16, followed by threats of retaliation without warning if the deadline was not met.

==== 2000s ====
In 2000, the SNLA claimed to have sent over 12,000 e-mails bearing anti-English messages to the Northern Constabulary headquarters in Inverness, in an attempt to crash the force's main computer system. A spokesman for the Scottish Separatist Group (SSG), who denied involvement in the e-mail attack, claimed that the Northern Constabulary was allegedly targeted due to significant employment of English police officers, along with the SNLA's dissatisfaction with the force's handling of past investigations. A spokeswoman for the Northern Constabulary clarified that over 1000 e-mails from the SNLA had been received at the Inverness headquarters, but stated that minimal disruption occurred, as the computer receiving the e-mails was not connected to the force's other systems.

In 2001, the group claimed responsibility for hoax anthrax packages delivered to the University of St Andrews, where Prince William was studying. The same year, Adam Busby Jr., the son of the organisation founder, was sentenced to six years in jail for carrying out various petrol bomb attacks. In 2002, Cherie Blair became a target of a renewed campaign by the SNLA when she was sent an anonymous parcel containing a vial that was crudely labelled as containing aromatherapy oil, but which on investigation proved to contain caustic acid. In addition, a renewed letter bomb campaign was waged against Scottish politicians, parcels were recovered after a man claiming to be from the SNLA made an anonymous phone call to Scotland Yard, claiming that up to 16 packages were distributed to various targets. In 2003, Paul Smith, a 17-year-old boy from Dumbarton, pleaded guilty to being involved with the actions, where he also admitted to delivering two hoax poison letters to Prince William. Smith also allegedly sent a total of 44 hoax anthrax letters between August 2001 and February 2002, in which one letter was posted to Prince William's halls of residence at St. Andrew's University, which contained a warning that stated "By the time you read this letter you will not be able to breathe and will be suffering respiratory failure." When Smith had been arrested in April 2002, his computer was seized by police for further investigation, where it was discovered that Smith had been recruited by an anonymous man via e-mail to aid the group with their activities, in which dozens of e-mails between the two were reportedly found.

In 2006, it was reported that the group was being investigated by the Home Office and Strathclyde Police, after the group had sent an e-mail to the Glasgow offices of The Sunday Times, threatening to poison England's water supplies. The e-mail stated: "Our aim is to poison water supplies in England, not in the entire UK. We have the means to do this and we shall. This is a war and we intend to win it." In addition, it was reported that Adam Busby may be targeted for extradition to the United States to face terror charges, following a series of e-mails to the country about how to contaminate US water supplies.

In January 2008, two men, Wayne Cook and Steven Robinson were convicted in Manchester of sending miniature bottles of vodka contaminated with caustic soda to various public figures, which included Blackburn with Darwen councillor John Wright, and Scottish Daily Express journalist Myra Philp, and threatening to kill English people "at random and with no discrimination or compunction" by poisoning English water supplies, echoing a previous threat made in 2006. The poisoned bottle sent to Philp was accompanied by a letter signed 'SNLA' stating "This is necessary to convince the British Government that we will lethally poison England's water supplies, if they do not withdraw totally from Scotland." Cook and Robinson were each sentenced by the Manchester Crown Court to six years in jail for these offences.

In June 2009, Adam Busby Jr. was reincarcerated for six years for sending a total of six packages containing shotgun cartridges accompanied by notes bearing threats of violence to various political figures, including First Minister Alex Salmond, Liberal Democrat MSP Mike Rumbles, the Scottish National Party (SNP) headquarters, and Glasgow City Council. Police linked the crimes to Busby Jr. after he made calls to numerous journalists claiming responsibility for the actions.

==== Ceasefire and extradition of Busby ====
In July 2010, Adam Busby Sr. was sentenced by an Irish court to four years in jail after being convicted in June 2010 of making hoax bomb threats against transatlantic flights. In 2012, following the UK government's offer to legislate to allow the Scottish Government the powers to hold a referendum on Scottish independence, the group issued a statement to media outlets declaring a ceasefire, with hopes of achieving independence more "peacefully and democratically". The statement said:

In order to facilitate the democratic process currently taking place in Scotland, the Scottish National Liberation Army, after 30 years of armed struggle is declaring a ceasefire. However, we warn the British government that should they seek to deny, limit or interfere with the Scottish people’s legitimate right to national self-determination we shall resume activities with a vengeance.

Following his 2010 conviction, Adam Busby was released from jail on 21 March 2014, and was reported at the time to be living in a Dublin hostel, banned from internet access, and was awaiting verdicts about possible extradition to Scotland and the US. In February 2015, Busby was extradited back to Scotland. In October of that year, however, a Glasgow court ruled that Busby, who at the time was diagnosed with multiple sclerosis, was medically unfit to be tried over multiple bomb threats. In 2017, the Sheriff court of Lothian and Borders in Edinburgh ruled that Busby, by then 69, was too ill to be sent to the US, as his illness was at an advanced stage.

== Associated organisations ==
The Scottish Separatist Group (SSG; Scottish Gaelic: Comunn Dealachadh na h-Alba) has been described as the political wing of the SNLA. The SSG was formed in 1995 by breakaway members and supporters of the SNLA and shared the same ideology, with an emphasis on reversing English immigration into Scotland and promoting Scottish Gaelic as the country's national language.

In 1999, an SSG letter to The Press and Journal threatened to intensify their protests against English immigration, with a particular focus on demonstrating against the Royal family, who were due to attend upcoming events in Aberdeen. The letter explicitly indicated that the group intended to host demonstrations at Balmoral Castle and Braemar, where the royal family where due to visit, along with Crathie Kirk, where the Queen and Prince Philip where due to be joined by then-prime minister Tony Blair and his wife, Cherie. The letter also claimed that the group, who were reportedly based in Dundee at the time, had set up a new branch in Aberdeen, with the intention of covering Buchan to the Mearns. Alex Salmond, then leader of the Scottish National Party (SNP) condemned the threats, stating "Previous elections have shown there is absolutely no support from the people of the North-east for the kind of politics these people represent." The letter was forwarded to Grampian Police, who subsequently launched an investigation.

In 2000, the group sent e-mails to several MSPs giving information on how to disrupt an upcoming visit to Inverness from the Queen and the Duke of Edinburgh on 3 July, along with announcements of a demonstration from the group against the monarchy, leading to a renewed investigation by police. The week before, it was reported that various road signs near Inverness, Elgin, and Aviemore had been smeared with symbols and slogans associated with both the SSG and the SNLA. The SSG was also discovered to have established links with the alleged political wing of the Real IRA, the 32 County Sovereignty Movement (32CSM), where it was reportedly exchanging information on the upcoming Royal visit to Inverness. The 32CSM also reportedly included a link on their website leading to the SSG's website, which featured an appeal for support in disrupting upcoming Royal visits.

In 2006, the Home Office launched an investigation into the SSG under the Terrorism Act 2006 after the group had allegedly published detailed instructions on how to contaminate English water supplies. The published material was said to provide instructions on how to craft and use an unnamed substance, which was described as a "WMD" in the publication, to permanently poison the water supplies of major UK cities, with the aim of "destroying the economic, political and military power of the state by poisoning and contaminating the drinking water supplies of any major city."

== Reception and legacy ==
The SNLA has been condemned by the UK government, the Irish government, and Scottish National Party (SNP) leader John Swinney, who described the organisation as people who "have no interest in Scotland or the Scottish people", and that its members were "not nationalists, they are criminals plain and simple." In 2002, The Independent described the actions of the group as "a warning of what might have been if democrats had not taken control of the SNP after the Second World War," and labelled the group as "lost souls in an inhospitable wilderness."

To date, none of the actions carried out by the group have resulted in any deaths, and the group has long been believed to have consisted of very few members. Author Andrew Murray Scott, who co-wrote Britain's Secret War, in which the group's activities are examined, stated in a 1993 interview with The Herald following McIntosh's imprisonment: "I believe the SNLA effectively finished in 1984 as an organisation and now it is only one or two people. Adam Busby persistently claims to be involved with it but he could be it." When the group delivered caustic packages to Downing Street in 2002, University of St Andrews professor and terrorism expert Paul Wilkinson commented: "The SNLA has surfaced from time to time. It's obviously very tiny, in fact I understand the police are working on the theory it may have been just one individual behind this."
