= Tom McAlpine =

Scottish nationalist politician

Thomas McAlpine (23 September 1929 – 21 February 2006) was a Scottish nationalist politician.

Born in Wishaw, McAlpine studied at Dalziel High School, then graduated in engineering from the Royal College of Science and Technology in Glasgow. He became involved with the Iona Community, becoming first its youth leader, then one of its first three lay members. He was a founder member of the Scottish Campaign for Nuclear Disarmament, and was prominent in the Committee of 100. Through this, he met and married his third wife, Isobel Lindsay, a lecturer at the University of Strathclyde. He joined the Labour Party and was elected as a councillor in Hamilton in 1960, but later left in protest at its support for nuclear weapons and in 1967 instead joined the Scottish National Party (SNP).

In 1963, McAlpine established the Rowen Engineering Company, a workers' co-operative. Later, in 1970, he set up Chieftain Industries with William Wolfe to make domestic heaters and later heat pumps.

McAlpine soon became prominent in the SNP. He stood in Bothwell at the 1970 general election, taking 12.8% of the vote, then in Lanark in February and October 1974, narrowly missing election, with 35.8% of the votes cast. He stood again in Lanark in 1979, Clydesdale in 1983 and finally Dumfriesshire in 1987, but never came close to winning a seat again.

McAlpine also served as a Vice Chairman of the SNP, with responsibility for Administration, in the 1970s, and again in the early 1980s. In 1988, he was elected as a councillor in Biggar on Clydesdale District Council. He remained an SNP representative even though his wife left the party and later joined Labour, although he did not always take the party line. He opposed the restructuring of local government in Scotland in the mid-1990s, but won his seat on the new South Lanarkshire Council until he died unexpectedly in 2006.

Party political offices
Preceded by New position	Scottish National Party Vice Chairman (Administration); 1973–1975	Succeeded by Willie McRae
Preceded by Willie McRae	Scottish National Party Vice Chairman (Administration); 1983–1988	Succeeded by ?
