= Siol nan Gaidheal =

Scottish ultranationalist and ethnic nationalist group

Siol nan Gaidheal Sìol nan Gàidheal
- Black and white saltire used by the group.
- Founder: Tom Moore (original form); Jackie Stokes (later incarnations)
- Founded: 1978 (original form); 1987 (second form); 1997 (current form)
- Newspaper: Firinn Albannach (1980s)
- Ideology: Ultranationalism; Ethnic nationalism; Scottish independence
- Political position: Right-wing

Website
- Official website

Siol nan Gaidheal or Sìol nan Gàidheal ([ˈʃiəl̪ˠ nə ˈŋɛː.əl̪ˠ], meaning "Seed of the Gaels") is a Scottish ultranationalist and ethnic nationalist group which describes itself as a "cultural and fraternal organisation".

The first incarnation of the group was founded by Tom Moore in 1978, though it became defunct twice and was re-established by Jackie Stokes in 1987 and again in 1997.

The group has been variously described by commentators as anywhere from "traditionalist" to "crypto-fascist" or "proto-fascist". Members of the group have been banned from membership of the mainstream nationalist Scottish National Party (SNP) since 1982.

== History ==
=== First incarnation (1978–1985) ===
The organisation was founded in 1978 by Tom Moore and Gordon Walker as Sons of Scotland, before adopting the name Siol nan Gaidheal. Moore, who had spent twelve years in New York before returning to Scotland, later said he founded the organisation because he believed the Scottish nationalist movement lacked militancy, describing the SNP as "mealy-mouthed". Moore claimed that the organisation's aim was to "inspire nationalism without inhibition or restraint". The group rose to prominence in the aftermath of the 1979 Scottish devolution referendum, in which a majority of votes cast supported devolution in Scotland, but the proposal failed to meet the required electoral threshold under the Scotland Act 1978. During this period, the organisation advocated ecological and anti-nuclear policies. In 1980, the SNP's national executive decided that membership of Siol nan Gaidheal was incompatible with membership of the party, and the party launched an inquiry into the group, with Colin Bell as vice-chairman. The group was expelled from the SNP in 1982.

The 1320 Club, associated with figures such as Hugh MacDiarmid, merged into the organisation in 1982. Throughout the 1980s, Siol nan Gaidheal published a newspaper called Firinn Albannach (Scottish Truth). In 1982, members of the organisation attempted to accost prime minister Margaret Thatcher as she left the Conservative Party Conference in Perth. Police escorted Thatcher into a vehicle before the group reached her, and her personal security in Scotland was subsequently increased. The same year, some members of Siol nan Gaidheal established a paramilitary wing known as Arm nan Gaidheal (Army of the Gael), which claimed responsibility for a number of incendiary attacks targeting political party offices and other buildings. On 17 July 1982, a fire broke out at Redford Barracks in Edinburgh after a caller claiming to represent the "Scottish Independence Army" told Scottish newspapers that incendiary devices had been placed at military barracks in the Edinburgh area. Police and Army security personnel searched several military sites, but the Army subsequently said that it did not believe the warning was connected to the fire, while police found no evidence that the fire had been caused by an incendiary device. Scotland on Sunday later attributed the incident to Arm nan Gaidheal, while a later account suggested that the Scottish Independence Army may have been an early incarnation of the group. Don Molloy, a 46-year-old man from Port Glasgow, was subsequently charged in connection with the fire.

On 24 November 1982, Siol nan Gaidheal member Ian Paton set fire to the Assembly Rooms in Edinburgh by dropping milk cartons filled with petrol through a window. The resulting blaze was extinguished by the building's manager, and Paton was subsequently convicted of the attack. Arm nan Gaidheal claimed responsibility for the attack in a message to The Scotsman, stating that it was in protest against a planned visit by prime minister Margaret Thatcher two days later. On 2 December 1982, a fire occurred at Labour Party offices in Rattray Street, Dundee, after an inflammable liquid was poured through the letterbox and ignited. Arm nan Gaidheal claimed responsibility, stating that the attack was retaliation for an alleged assault on a Scottish nationalist by a Labour councillor and other party members. Three students living in the flat above became trapped by smoke and were rescued by firefighters; the Labour offices sustained smoke and fire damage. Dundee Labour secretary George Galloway condemned the attack and denied knowledge of the alleged assault, while the SNP publicly disassociated itself from the attack. Another Scottish nationalist paramilitary group, the Scottish National Liberation Army, also later claimed responsibility for the attack. In January 1983, ahead of another planned visit by Thatcher, Paton and fellow Siol nan Gaidheal member Gordon Docherty attempted to set fire to a car belonging to Matthew Neill, chief executive of the Glasgow Chamber of Commerce, at his home in Paisley. Police officers who had been conducting surveillance nearby extinguished the fire, and Paton and Docherty were subsequently convicted of attempting to set fire to the vehicle. Paton, who cooperated with police and provided information about Arm nan Gaidheal, was sentenced to 120 hours of community service, while Docherty was fined £75.

On St Andrew's Day in 1985, Siol nan Gaidheal claimed responsibility for the theft of a brass eagle lectern dating from 1498 from St Stephen's Church in St Albans. The lectern had previously been housed at Holyrood Abbey before being taken to England following the Earl of Hertford's attack on Edinburgh in 1544 during the Rough Wooing. Siol nan Gaidheal claimed that the lectern had been taken to Scotland and concealed in the West Highlands. However, another group, the "Scottish National Guardians", subsequently claimed responsibility and provided a photograph of the lectern alongside a current newspaper as evidence; police concluded that Siol nan Gaidheal had not been responsible for the theft. The incident was subsequently described as the last public mention of the original incarnation of Siol nan Gaidheal.

=== Second incarnation (1987–1990s) ===
The organisation was revived in 1987 by Jackie Stokes, who was previously a member of the Scottish Republican Socialist Party. This incarnation explicitly rejected violence and focused on cultural and republican activism. By 1988, it claimed a membership of 300. Its activities included, in 1989, erecting a cairn in memory of Willie McRae—who was sympathetic to SnG, and possibly at one point a member—along with Michael Strathern. By the early 1990s, Stokes had serious health issues, including kidney problems.

=== Third incarnation (1997–present) ===
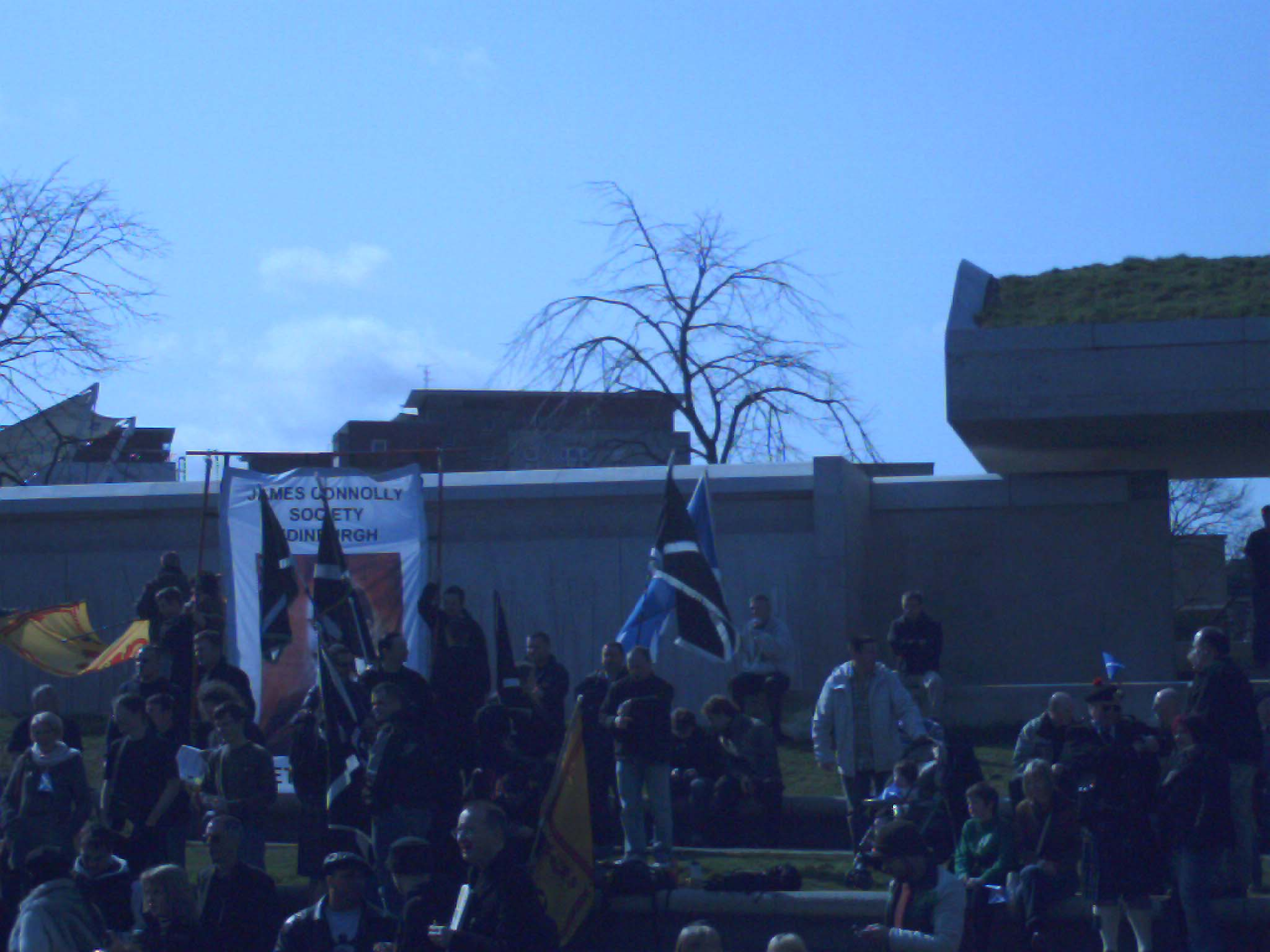
Siol nan Gaidheal and Connolly Society at protest in 2007.

Re-established again in 1997, the organisation shifted towards online activity, diaspora engagement, and participation in pro-independence demonstrations. By 2001, however, Stokes had passed away due to health issues which had been ongoing since the 1990s. Siol nan Gaidheal also formed a website called Clannasaor which called itself a political party despite not contesting in any elections. According to records of its manifesto, it described themselves as Social Democrats with minimal governance and advocated for both Scottish independence and euroscepticism.

Siol nan Gaidheal actively campaigned for Scottish independence during the 2014 independence referendum, though the official Yes Scotland campaign distanced itself from SnG. The group made headlines in the run-up to the referendum for heckling Labour MP Jim Murphy on his visits to Dundee and Montrose.

Siol nan Gaidheal has marched at pro-independence demonstrations organised by All Under One Banner. In 2018, the online magazine Bella Caledonia criticised AUOB for platforming what it described as a "fascist" group. AUOB replied that while Siol nan Gaidheal's banner was not welcome, it was unable to physically ban the organisation from its marches. SnG went on to say on their website in response to AUOB's requests; "We're quite happy to limit its (SnG flag) use to political rallies in future". Political campaigner Math Campbell, who founded the pro-independence group English Scots for Yes, said that Siol nan Gaidheal's presence left him and others feeling unwelcome: "They claim they have moved on from those days, when Siol Nan Gaidheal members later went on to be involved in the Scottish National Liberation Army, setting fire to houses and intimidating New Scots. We'd like to believe that claim, but the Siol Nan Gaidheal official website, right now, still contains articles saying things like 'every English incomer is suspect, the good with the bad', and talking of Scottishness being linked to ancestry and birthplace, the so-called 'blood and soil' position adopted by fascist groups worldwide." In a Facebook post, Siol nan Gaidheal responded by saying that its website is "somewhat unrepresentative of the current Siol nan Gaidheal". It is also suspected that Siol nan Gaidheal could be associated or aligned with the Scottish Republican Socialist Movement as SRSM flags have been spotted amongst Siol nan Gaidheal rallies.

On 11 January 2020, an AUOB pro-independence demonstration in Glasgow marched behind a banner badged with the Siol nan Gaidheal symbol. In 2022, SNP MSP Evelyn Tweed apologised after being photographed holding an Siol nan Gaidheal banner at an AUOB march commemorating the Battle of Bannockburn.

== Reception ==
The organisation has been described in a variety of ways by commentators, including as traditionalist, ultranationalist, ethnonationalist and, by some critics, proto-fascist.

Supporters and members reject these characterisations. They argue that the organisation reflects a form of left-leaning, anti-imperialist and culturally focused Scottish nationalism. In a Facebook reply, SnG claimed that their organisation's logo represents "both our Celtic heritage and also the interwoven strands of ALL the peoples who have become Scots and part of our heritage."

== See also ==
- 1320 Club
- 79 Group
- Scottish republicanism
- Scottish independence
