= Dunkeld Lectern =

Medieval brass eagle lectern

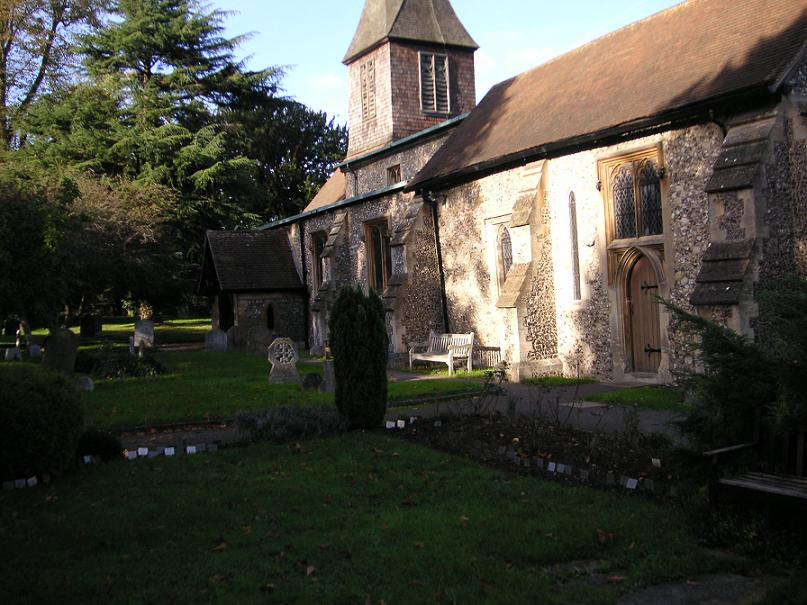
St Stephen's Church, St Albans, which, under the Church of England, has been the legal owner of the Dunkeld Lectern for over 400 years

The Dunkeld Lectern, also known in Scotland as the Holyrood Bird, is a medieval brass eagle lectern. It stands approximately 1.6 metres high and takes the form of a large eagle or phoenix with outspread wings, with the bird perched on an orb supported by a turned shaft. Engraved on the orb, between two depictions of lions and a mitre, is the Latin inscription "Georgius Creichton Episcopus Dunkeldensis" (transl. George Creichton Bishop of Dunkeld). It formerly featured three lions at its base, until 1972 when they were stolen temporarily.

It is probable that the fifteenth-century lectern is of English manufacture and was possibly given to Holyrood Abbey by the abbot George Creichton (fl.1515-1528) on being made bishop of Dunkeld in 1528. It was then looted from the abbey by the English army in 1544 in the Rough Wooing and taken south to St Stephen's Church, St Albans, England. It laid in a grave at the church for 106 years after being hidden during the English Civil War. Upon its reappearance, requests from Scotland for its repatriation, starting in the 18th century, were initially rebuffed. In 1984, over 400 years after it was first taken to England, the lectern was stolen from the church by Scottish nationalist group Siol nan Gaidheal and it did not reappear until May 1999, when it was anonymously delivered to Netherbow Arts Centre. Since then, it has been on display at the National Museum of Scotland (NMS).

== Origin and early history ==
It is probable that the fifteenth-century lectern was made in England and that George Crichton, abbot of Holyrood Abbey (fl. 1515 to 1528) possibly presented to the Abbey when he was made Bishop of Dunkeld, the office he held until his death in 1543.

=== Burning of Edinburgh and looting ===
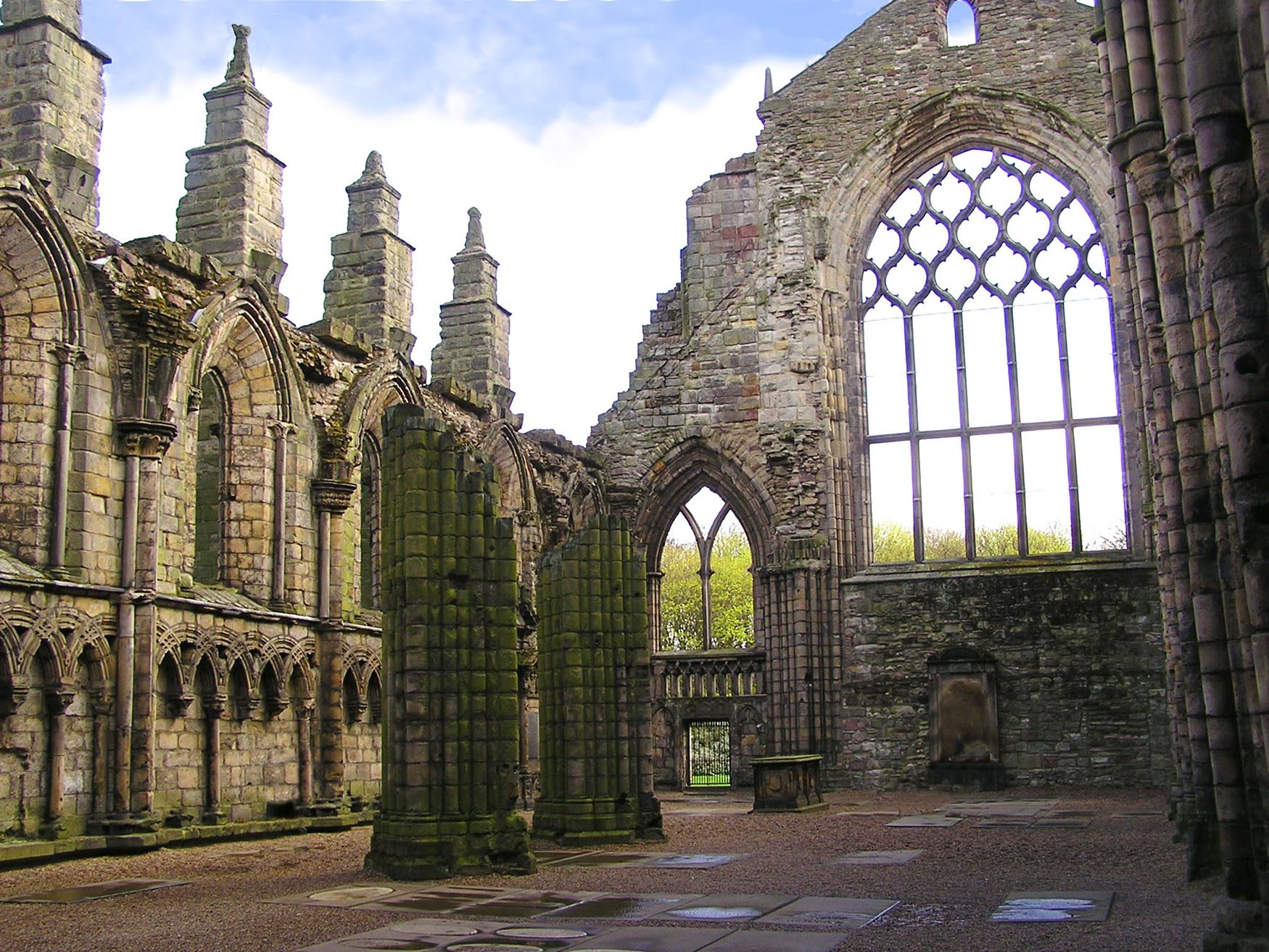
The Holyrood Abbey ruins, from which the Dunkeld Lectern was taken in May 1544

At the beginning of 1544 during the war of the Rough Wooing, Henry VIII directed the commander-in-chief of the English army, the Earl of Hertford, to "put all to fyre and sworde, burne Edinborough town... [so it] may remayn forever a perpetuel memory of the vengeance of God... for their [the Scots] faulsehode and disloyailtye... over throwe the castle, sack Holyrod house", in an attempt to force the Scots to accept the marriage of his son Edward VI to Mary, Queen of Scots. In May 1544, Hertford and the English army marched to sack Edinburgh. The troops, including Surveyor of the King's Works Sir Richard Lee, destroyed and looted Holyrood Abbey, stealing objects including a brass font which Lee gave to Abbey Church (now St Albans Cathedral) and likely the Dunkeld Lectern.

Lee was granted the rectory of St Stephen's Church following the Reformation. Scottish antiquarian William Galloway argued in 1879 that Lee may have given the lectern to the church, as it appeared there that year.

=== English Civil War and tomb residence ===
In 1642, the English Civil War began, and in August 1643, laws were introduced authorising an increase in destruction of religious objects; continuity of the St Stephen's parish registers is broken perhaps hinting at the turbulent nature of those times. It was during 1643 that the lectern disappeared, likely hidden by Anglican clergy from the Puritan prosecutors.

Over 100 years later in 1748 or 1750, the Montgomery family tomb in the chancel of St Stephen's church was opened for an interment and the lectern was found lying in the grave. It was retrieved and brought back into continuous use until 1972.

== Scottish requests for return ==
The earliest evidenced demand for the return of the lectern appeared in the nineteenth century when the Scottish Guardian, dated 2 May 1879, published an article recounting the history of the lectern finishing with a plea for readers to find a way to "secure the lectern for our new Cathedral in Edinburgh. Who will take up the matter?" In November that year, an approach from the Lord Provost of Edinburgh was rebuffed by the vicar of St Stephen's, the Rev Marcus R. Southwell. In December of that year he wrote to the Lord Provost, sent his best wishes and expressed the "utmost repugnance to parting with the Crichton lectern." The Dean of the Order of the Thistle and Chapel Royal fared no better in 1914. Nor did further approaches made by Edinburgh Corporation in 1931 and 1936. Aside from this, in contrast to the Stone of Scone, few Scots were aware of the loss of the lectern.

In 1972, the lectern was found lying in pieces halfway down the nave of the church. The intruders took with them three small lions from the base of the lectern, though these were later recovered and kept in the church safe.

In 1982, the lectern returned to Scotland for the first time in over 400 years when the Church of England loaned the lectern to the National Museum of Scotland (NMS) for Angels, Nobles and Unicorns, a three-year exhibition of medieval Scottish art. Its appearance at the exhibition aroused strong nationalist feelings, and letters to the Scottish press demanded that it should remain in Scotland; but when the exhibition ended the lectern was returned to St Stephen's church.

=== Theft and return to Scotland ===
On Saint Andrew's Night, 30 November 1984, a group of individuals from the Scottish ultranationalist group Siol nan Gaidheal broke into the church and reclaimed the lectern, unintentionally leaving the three lions meant to be at its base behind in the church safe. It is believed that the group hid the lectern in a west Highland grave for the 15 years following the theft, indicating that it would remain there until a Scottish parliament was established. The party contacted the press and reported they had the lectern "somewhere in the West Highlands". They provided a photograph and wrote that "this piece of our heritage is here to stay... patriotic Scots have asked for the eagle to be returned... to its rightful home. English arrogance won the day... all requests were refused." Efforts were made to locate and retrieve the lectern for seven years following the theft, and Hertfordshire police pursued inquiries and established communication with the thieves; they stipulated that they would not release the lectern unless it could be guaranteed that firstly, it would remain in Scotland, and secondly, they would not be prosecuted.

Representatives of the established churches of Scotland and England met several times to resolve the matter. Dialogue between all parties was aided by the activities of Inverness Press and Journal reporter John Vass as well as Reverend John Pragnell, the Netherbow council's convenor David Maxwell, and David Caldwell of the NMS have all been credited with negotiating between all parties to encourage the safe and legal return of the lectern.

Over the years, Vass received a number of anonymous communications from those who held the lectern. The "kidnappers" laid down two conditions before the Dunkeld lectern would be released: that it was to stay in Scotland, and that no action would be taken to find and prosecute those responsible. St Stephen's parish made an offer that should the lectern be forthcoming, the parish would see that it was returned to Scotland.

In recognition of this promise, St Margaret's Church in Barnhill, Dundee offered Reverend David Ridgeway of St Stephen's church a replica of the Dunkeld lectern made for the Scottish church in 1896 to replace the one stolen from St Stephen’s in 1984. The Church of Scotland decided to proceed, and, in 1995, presented St Stephen's Church with the Barnhill lectern. It was hoped by both sides that this action would lead to the surfacing of the original lectern; St Stephen's Church council gave up its rights to the original as part of the deal. Member of the European Parliament for the Highlands and Islands and later Scottish National Party leader Winnie Ewing, who has been identified as a key mediator in later negotiations, also made appeals for the lectern's return when interest picked up again in the late 1990s.

== Reappearance and restoration ==
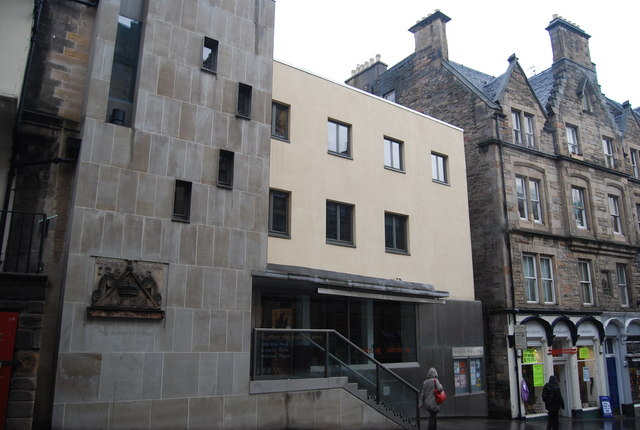
The Scottish Storytelling Centre, formerly the Netherbow Arts Centre, where the lectern appeared in 1999

In 1999, director of the Netherbow Arts Centre Dr Donald Smith planned an event at the centre, located on Edinburgh's Royal Mile, for Saturday 1 May, believing that setting a deadline may lead to progress in the retrieval of the lectern. On Friday 30 April, after being missing for 15 years and less than a week before the first elections to the new Scottish Parliament, the original Dunkeld Lectern was delivered undamaged to the hallway of the Arts Centre by an anonymous courier without a message. Smith later recalled the delivery, stating that "we were given a message that there had been a delivery in reception and when we went down we found that the lectern was standing there. We are delighted." The lectern was authenticated by the NMS early in the morning of 1 May. Ewing acted as a "gobetween" for the parties during this time; she said that the people who contacted her who had the lectern never revealed their names.

The lectern became part of a debate around restitution at the time. upon the appearance of the lectern in Arts Centre, Smith speculated that the anonymous donors wanted the lectern to be on view for the Scottish public, and likened the situation to "an Elgin Marbles scenario." Winnie Ewing stated, in reference to the lectern, that "not only have we seen the return of the Stone of Destiny to Scotland, but another part of our history is returning".

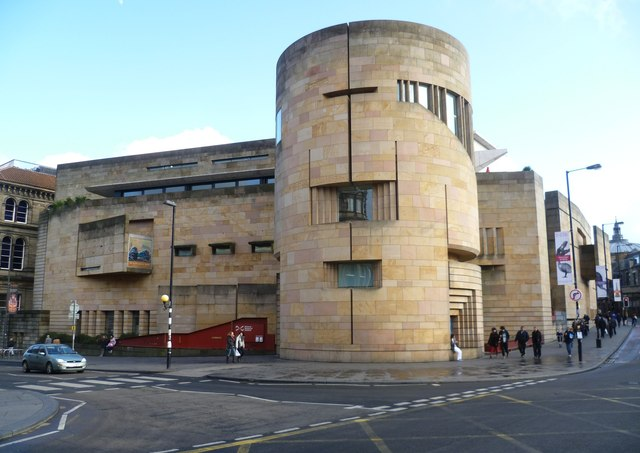
The lectern is now held at the National Museum of Scotland

It was decided that the lectern would be kept at the NMS until an agreement on a permanent location could be reached. Some, including Ewing, suggested that it should be used for ceremonial purposes at the newly built Scottish Parliament Building, including its official opening on 1 July that year. In August 2004, a permanent loan agreement was negotiated between National Museums Scotland and the St Albans church which was the legal owner of the lectern, which would allow for further conservation work; in December 2005, resulting from an uncontested ruling by the chancellor of the St Albans Diocese attended by the Council for the Care of Churches, the church announced that this agreement would be honoured, meaning that the relic could go on public display in Scotland. Keeper of the department of Scotland and Europe at the NMS David Caldwell, who was present upon the return of the lectern, stated that the "loan provides a great opportunity for the lectern to be displayed as an important piece of Scottish medieval history", and that "the significant role of St Albans in the story of the lectern will not be forgotten."

Mark Jones, who was director of National Museums Scotland when the lectern was rediscovered in 1999, put forward in 2014 that because "the lectern originated not in Scotland but in Italy", because it was "associated with St Stephen’s Church, St Albans for more than 400 years [...] much longer than with Dunkeld (less than 20 years)", and because eagle lecterns are usually "found in churches north of London, in East Anglia and central England, and it seems probable that they were made in England or the Low Countries", it must have been "Sir Richard Lee’s putative pillage, that motivated the Church and others to work for, or accept, its return to Scotland, rather than anything particularly Scottish about the object."

== Sources ==
- "The Dunkeld Lectern". St Stephen's Parish Church, St Albans. St Albans City & District Council. Archived from the original on 3 December 2005.
- "News monitor: August 16-31, 2004". Scottish Christian. Archived from the original on 24 September 2004.
- "Church of Scotland News: Wednesday, December 28, 2005". Scottish Christian. Archived from the original on 23 June 2006.
- Galloway, William (14 April 1879). "Notice of an Ancient Scottish Lectern of Brass, Now in the Parish Church of St Stephen's, St Albans, Hertfordshire" (PDF). Proceedings of the Society of Antiquaries of Scotland. Society of Antiquaries of Scotland: 287–301. Archived from the original (PDF) on 11 June 2007.
