= Richard Lee (engineer) =

English military engineer, born 1513

Sir Richard Lee (1513–1575) was an English military engineer in the service of Henry VIII, Edward VI, and Elizabeth I. He was a commander of Henry VIII and appointed surveyor of the King's works. Lee was member of parliament for Hertfordshire in 1545. He was the first English engineer to be knighted.

== Surveyor of Calais ==
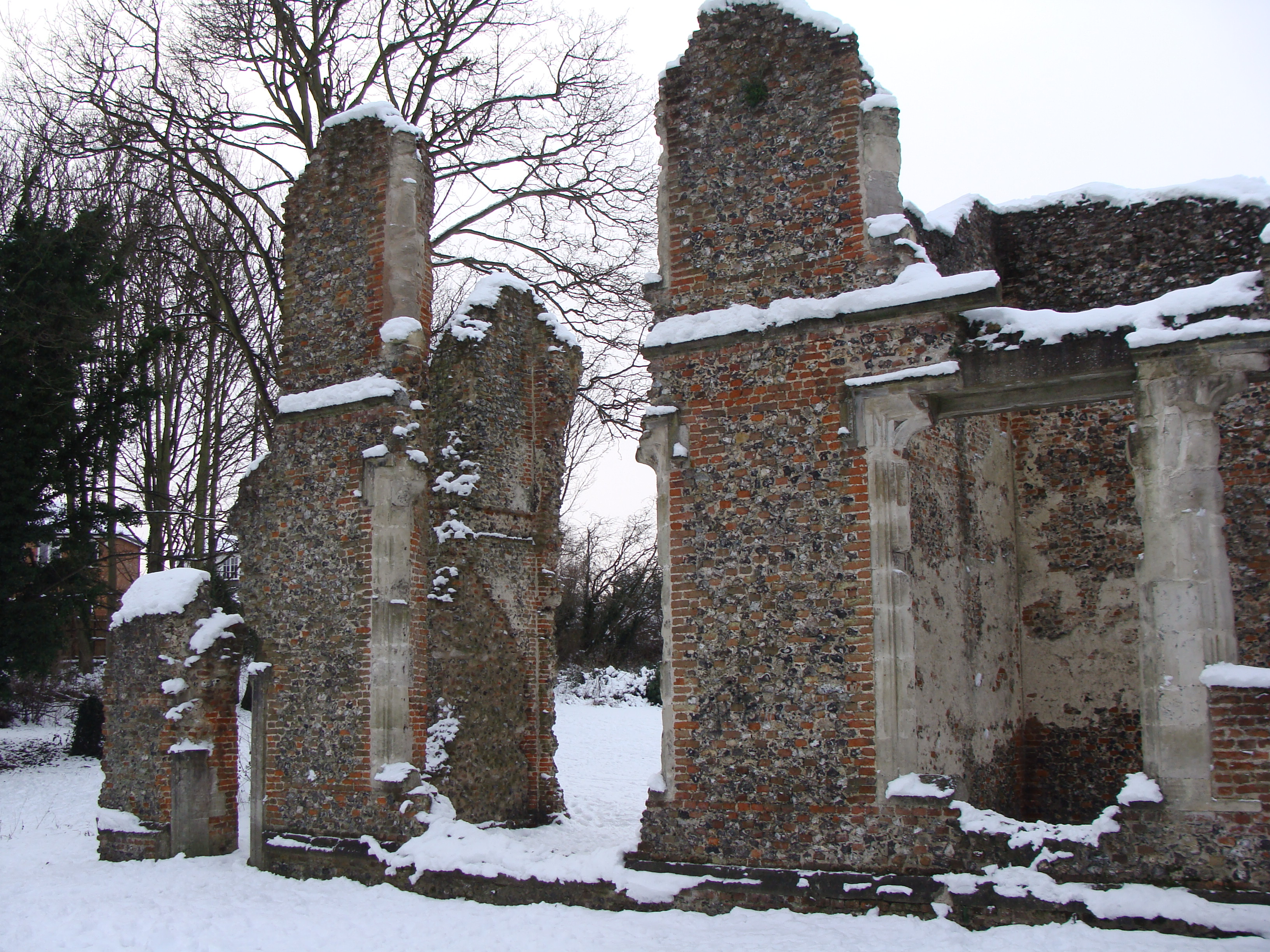
Ruins of Lee's house at Sopwell Priory

Between 1536 and 1542 Lee was surveyor of works at Calais as the successor of William Lilgrave. He may have been a master mason, and his promotion was due to Thomas Cromwell . In 1538 he returned to England to advise Thomas Wriothesley on the conversion of Titchfield Abbey. Following the dissolution of St Albans Abbey he himself purchased the grounds of the abbey (the abbey church itself was sold by King Edward VI to the people of St Albans in 1553), with Sopwell Priory and the rectorship of St Stephen's church (both of which were nearby). He tore down the priory and built a Tudor house on the site which he named Lee Hall. He also purchased the manor of Abbots Langley.

In 1539 he was back at Calais implementing plans for re-fortification devised by Henry VIII in 1532. Only brick was available at Calais so Lee shipped freestone and timber from Kent, with salvaged material from the demolished monasteries at Faversham and St. Augustines, Canterbury. Lee constructed a new harbour at Dykeland on the Hammes river for the Kentish ships. In 1541 Lee started building a trefoil shaped bulwark called the Dublin Tower.

== In Scotland ==
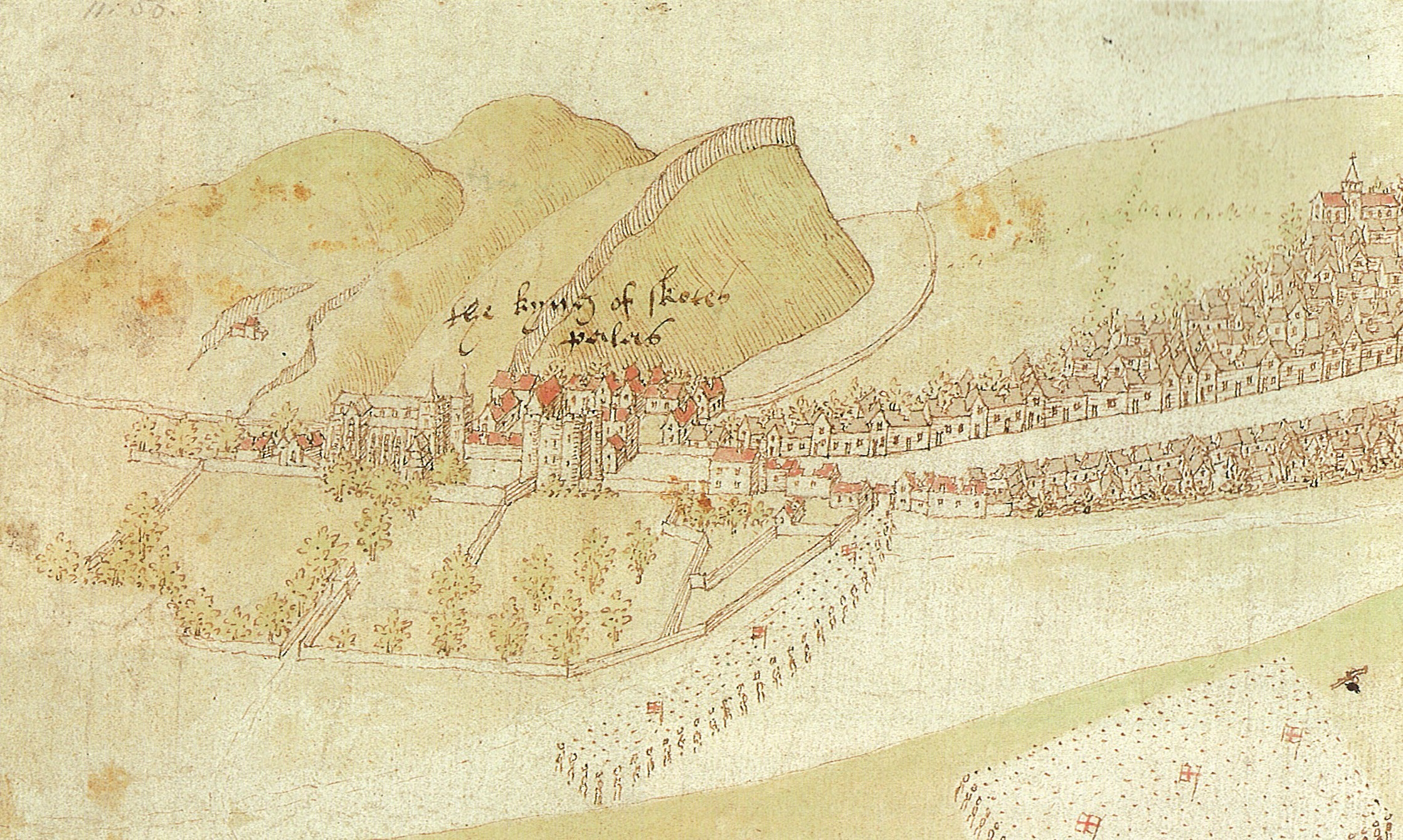
Sketch by Lee of Edinburgh showing an English column marching on Holyroodhouse in 1544

During the war of the Rough Wooing, in January 1544 Richard was sent into Scotland with the Italian engineers Antonio da Bergamo and John Thomas Scala, as expert men in the skill of fortifying. With the Surveyor of Calais, William Burgate, he joined Lord Hertford's raid on Edinburgh in May 1544. Lee pronounced Edinburgh Castle to be impregnable, and made plans of the town and Leith. He was knighted by Lord Hertford at Leith. Lee is generally believed to have plundered the Dunkeld Lectern from Holyrood Abbey during an attack on Edinburgh in 1544. He certainly took the brass font from Holyrood once used to christen Scottish monarchs. Now destroyed, it was formerly at St Albans with his name and the story of its capture in 1544 was engraved on it.

After the battle of Pinkie Cleugh in September 1547, Lee was made General Surveyor of the King's Majesty's works and fortifications in the North parts, for the duration of the Scottish war.

== Coastal defence ==
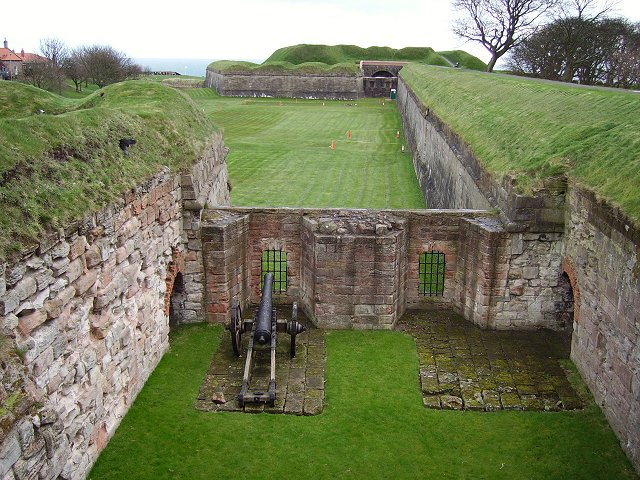
Looking into the gun position in a flanking bastion, and along the walls at Berwick upon Tweed

Around 1550–1552, Lee was at Berwick-upon-Tweed constructing the novel trace-italienne fortifications. In 1557, he was trench-master to the Earl of Pembroke in the Netherlands, and, in 1558, went to Berwick as Surveyor of Works.

After working at Portsmouth, in 1560 Richard was again supervising the re-fortification of Berwick, by correspondence with Rowland Johnston and in person in April. He was to "set forward the device for Berwick": to design the new works. Lee also went to the Siege of Leith on 27 April 1560 asked to, "prick them forward to an end." This was probably to help plan the assault on 7 May which failed. Lee made a map of Leith which was sent to London on 15 May 1560.

Lee returned to supervise work at Berwick in July 1560, and sent another "plat" of Leith to William Cecil. Lee and Pelham, a captain at Leith, were called before Elizabeth I in June 1564, perhaps to give their testimony on affairs at Leith. When in London at this period, Lee stayed at the house of Mr. Graisse in Cheapside. In 1565, Lee viewed the site of Lindisfarne Castle on Beblowe Crag.

Lee's successors as Surveyor of Berwick were Rowland Johnson, and in April 1584 William Spicer.

== List of works ==
Funerary armour from Sir Richard Lee's tomb at St Peter's Church, St Albans (St Albans Museums)

- Berwick upon Tweed
- Calais
- Dover Harbour
- Harwich and Langar Point
- Lindisfarne Castle
- Siege of Leith
- Norham Castle; July 1550 with Sir Thomas Palmer.
- Queenborough
- Roxburgh Fort
- Sandown, Isle of Wight
- Southsea Castle
- Tynemouth Castle; March 1545 with Gian Tommaso Scala and Antonio da Bergamo.
- Upnor Castle
