= 1999 Water Supply Blackmail Plot =

Blackmail and terrorist plot in the UK

1999 English water supply blackmail plot
- Water supply blackmail plot Part of Northern Ireland peace process
- Date: June–July 1999
- Location: England, United Kingdom
- Methods: Threatened contamination of water supplies
- Status: Foiled
- Result: Threat investigated and neutralised; no contamination occurred

Lead figures
Republican Revenge Group (Note: Claimed responsibility; attribution disputed.)	

Casualties and losses
None	None
- None

Casualties
- Death: 0
- Injuries: 0
- Arrested: Adam Busby
- Damage: None reported

1999 Water Supply Blackmail Plot was a blackmail and terrorist plot in the United Kingdom in 1999 from June and July of that year. The perpetrators, part of a self-described organisation called the "Republican Revenge Group", threatened to contaminate the public water infrastructure in England unless the British government withdrew from Northern Ireland.

== Background ==
The blackmail plot happened during a period of uncertainty surrounding the Northern Ireland peace process. The Good Friday agreement had been signed in April 1998. However, some Republican activists opposed the Good Friday agreement because of the continued presence of the British government in Northern Ireland.

== The threats ==
In June 1999, letters containing the threats were delivered to Papal Nuncio, the British ambassador to Ireland, Sir Ivor Roberts, and Ofwat in Birmingham. The letter that was sent to Roberts was accompanied by a request that it be passed to prime minister Tony Blair.

The letters said that an improvised chemical weapon would be attached to fire hydrants in England and forcing a weedkiller called New Pathclear into the water supply. The letters demanded that British forces leave Northern Ireland by June 16 and to take the threat seriously.

== The investigation ==
The authorities decided to take the threat seriously and the British government said that if a real threat was found they would inform the public. In Dublin the Gardai and the British police cooperated to find a suspect in the case and they subsequently arrested an ex-soldier from Scotland living in Dublin named Adam Busby.

The suspect, an ex-soldier from the Argyll and Sutherland Highlanders named Adam Busby, was aged 50 at the time of his arrest in Scotland. Busby was also a prominent figure in Scottish nationalism and is suspected of being the founder of the Scottish Nationalist Front. He arrived in Dublin ten years before the blackmail plot and claimed he was fleeing from harassment by British security services because he was a suspect in minor bombings in Scotland associated with the Scottish Nationalist Front.

== Reactions ==
David Veness, Scotland Yard's assistant commissioner for specialist operations, said that the plot could not be effectively enacted but nevertheless it was a threat of mass murder.

It was later reported that the British Embassy in Dublin thought the letters might have been a dirty trick by loyalists designed to smear republicans.
