= Adam Busby =

Scottish political activist

Adam Stuart Busby (born 1948) is a Scottish nationalist who claims to be the founder of the Scottish National Liberation Army. In 1983 after a hoax letter-bombing campaign against high-profile public figures, he organised attacks from Dublin involving anthrax hoaxes, bomb threats, and genuine parcel bombs. In 1997 he was jailed in Ireland for two hoax phone threats against Scottish media organisations.

== Early life ==
Busby was associated with the separatist group called the Scottish National Liberation Army. He joined the British army and trained briefly in the Argyll and Sutherland Highlanders.

== Career ==
In 1983 letter bombs were sent to the Ministry of Defence, oil companies and public figures including Lady Diana Spencer and the prime minister, Margaret Thatcher. The device sent to Thatcher was active and was opened by parliamentarian Robert Key but there was no explosion. Busby fled to Dublin after the letter-bombing campaign. He reportedly tried to join forces with the Provisional Irish Republican Army, but the offer is said to have been refused. He organised attacks from Dublin involving anthrax hoaxes, bomb threats, and genuine parcel bombs.

In 1997, Busby was jailed in Ireland for two hoax phone threats against Scottish media organisations.

In 1999, he then reportedly formed the short lived Republican Revenge Group (RRG), a proposed Pan-Celtic militant organisation. He was questioned by the gardaí in Dublin later that year regarding an RRG blackmail plot, threatening to contaminate English and Welsh water supplies with weedkiller unless then-Prime Minister Tony Blair withdrew from Northern Ireland.

In May 2006 he sent threats by email from Charleville Mall public library to BAA at London Heathrow Airport claiming bombs were on two New York flights. BAA did not take the threats seriously. Busby denied making the threats.

In September 2006, the Sunday Times reported that Busby might be targeted for extradition to the United States to face terror charges. Police in Ireland were said to have agreed to help the FBI, MI5 and Special Branch to investigate a series of e-mails to the US about how to contaminate US water supplies. They also reported that an email, believed to have been sent from Canada, contained a warning to their Glasgow office threatening to poison water supplies in England.

In July 2010 he was sentenced by a Dublin court to four years in jail for the May 2006 threats by email to BAA at London Heathrow Airport claiming bombs were on two New York flights. Two of the years were suspended due to his age and health, as he has multiple sclerosis and uses a wheelchair.

In 2010, Busby was alleged to have made threats against then-Prime Minister of the United Kingdom Gordon Brown.

On 15 August 2012, a United States federal grand jury returned two indictments charging Busby, a resident of Ballymun, Dublin, Ireland, with emailing bomb threats targeting the University of Pittsburgh, three federal courthouses and a federal officer. A separate four-count indictment charged Mr Busby with, on 20 and 21 June, maliciously conveying false information through the Internet claiming bombs had been placed at federal courthouses in Pittsburgh, Erie, and Johnstown in Pennsylvania.

Busby was released from an Irish prison on 21 March 2014 and was reported to be living in a Dublin hostel, banned from internet access, awaiting verdicts about his extradition to Scotland and the US.

In February 2015, Busby was extradited to Scotland. In October of that year, however, a Glasgow court ruled that he was medically unfit to be tried over multiple bomb threats. In 2017, the Sheriff Court of Lothian and Borders in Edinburgh ruled that Busby, by then 69, was too ill to be sent to the US, as his multiple sclerosis was at an advanced stage.
