= Willie McRae =

Scottish politician (1923–1985)

Professor emeritus

Personal details
- Born: 18 May 1923 Carron, Falkirk, Stirlingshire, Scotland
- Died: 7 April 1985 (aged 61) Aberdeen Royal Infirmary, Aberdeen, Scotland
- Cause of death: Self-inflicted gunshot to the head
- Party: Scottish National Party
- Education: University of Glasgow
- Occupation: Lawyer

Military service
- Allegiance: United Kingdom; British Raj
- Branch/service: British Army, then Royal Indian Navy
- Rank: Lt-Cdr, Royal Indian Navy
- Unit: Seaforth Highlanders
- Commands: Aide-de-camp to Admiral Lord Mountbatten

Willie McRae (18 May 1923 – 7 April 1985) was a Scottish lawyer, orator, naval officer, politician and anti-nuclear campaigner. In the Second World War he served in the British Army and then the Royal Indian Navy. He supported the Indian independence movement and for much of his life was active in the Scottish National Party (SNP).

McRae, who struggled with alcoholism and depression, died by suicide in 1985 after crashing his car in a remote part of the Scottish Highlands, shooting himself in the head with a revolver. McRae's death spawned conspiracy theories among Scottish Nationalists that he had been assassinated. These conspiracy theories were rejected by his family. Two plays related to McRae's life were staged in 2014, which prompted renewed interest in his death and the establishment of a privately funded "Justice For Willie" campaign. The campaign reported in 2016 that it had been unable to find any evidence to undermine the official suicide verdict.

== Life ==
=== Early life and education ===
McRae was born in Carron, Falkirk, where his father was an electrician. McRae edited a local newspaper in Grangemouth at the same time as reading history at the University of Glasgow, from which he gained a first-class degree. After the war McRae returned to the University of Glasgow and graduated again, this time in law. He authored the maritime law of Israel and was an emeritus professor of the University of Haifa. After his death a forest of 3,000 trees was planted in Israel in his memory.

=== War service ===
In the Second World War he was commissioned into the Seaforth Highlanders but transferred to the Royal Indian Navy, in which he became a lieutenant commander and aide-de-camp to Admiral Lord Mountbatten. He supported the Indian independence movement.

=== Political activities ===
McRae became a solicitor and an SNP activist. In both of the 1974 General Elections and in the 1979 General Election he stood for Parliament as the SNP candidate for Ross and Cromarty. In October 1974 he only lost to the Conservative Hamish Gray by 633 votes, but in 1979 Gray's majority increased to 4,735. In the latter year he also contested the SNP leadership, coming third in a three-way contest with 52 votes to Stephen Maxwell's 117 votes and winner Gordon Wilson's 530 votes.

McRae was a vocal critic of the British nuclear lobby. Early in the 1980s he was a key figure in a campaign against the United Kingdom Atomic Energy Authority plans to dispose of nuclear waste in the Mullwharchar area of the Galloway Hills. Representing the SNP in a public inquiry, McRae asked difficult questions of the UKAEA and famously declared at one meeting that "nuclear waste should be stored where Guy Fawkes put his gunpowder." The authority's plans were rejected, and McRae was credited with "single-handedly" preventing the area from becoming a nuclear waste dump.

== Death ==
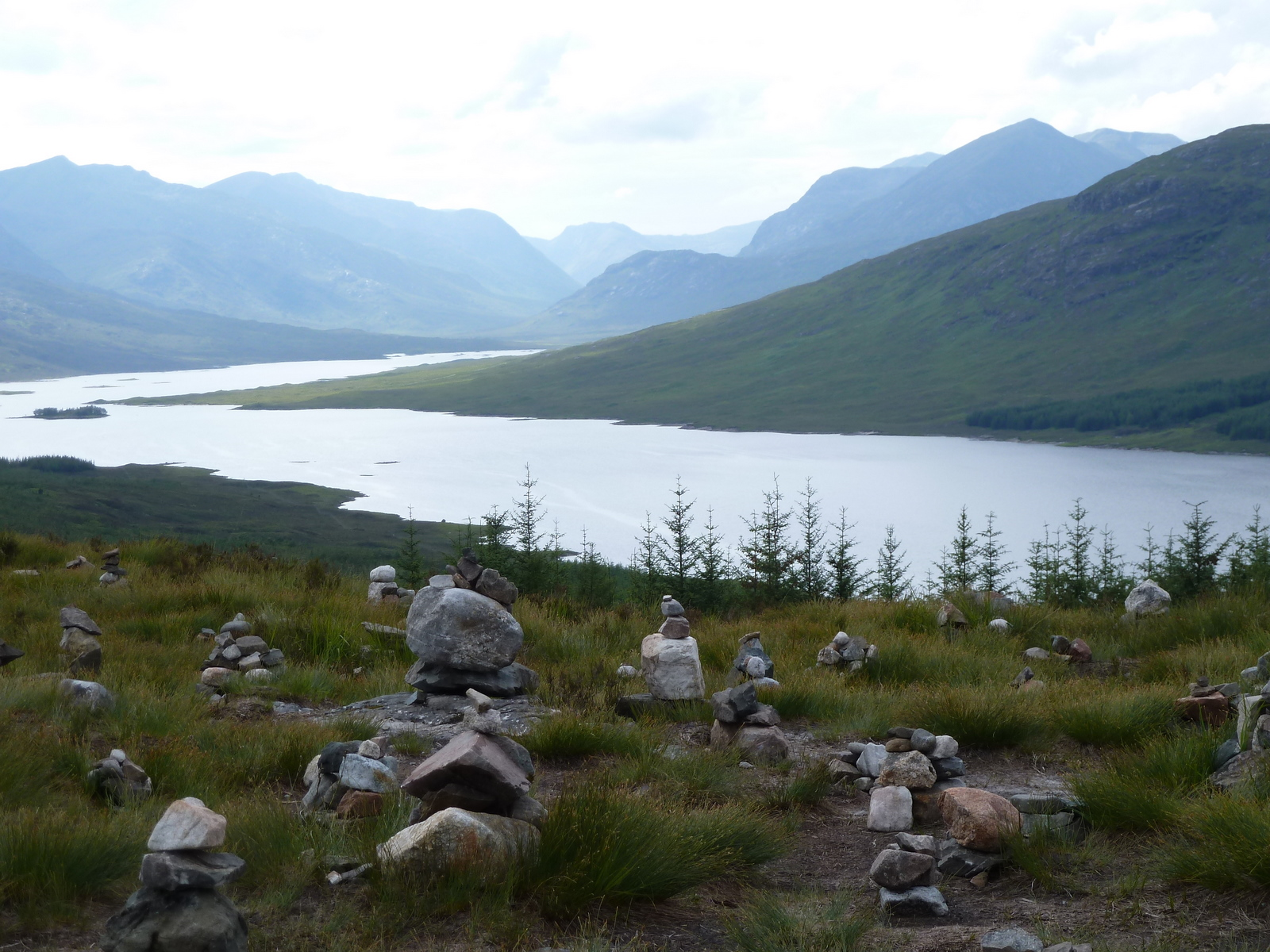
Loch Loyne, Glenmoriston, Inverness-shire. McRae and his car were found just off the road here.

McRae struggled with both depression and alcoholism: erratic behaviour led to him being removed from his law practice in 1981. At the time of his death, McRae had two drink driving convictions and was awaiting action on a third, which could have seen him jailed. He had already threatened suicide once. His brother Fergus recalled that; "Willie suffered from depression at times due to things just getting on top of him and finding it hard to cope." Fergus McRae related to the police investigating his brother's death that McRae had "not been himself" and had been drinking heavily.

On 5 April 1985 McRae left his Glasgow flat at 18:30 to spend the weekend at his cottage at Ardelve near Dornie, Ross-shire. He was not seen again until the next morning around 10:00, when two Australian tourists, Alan Crowe, an airline pilot, and his wife Barbara, saw his maroon Volvo saloon car on a moor a short distance from the junction of the A887 and A87 roads Bun Loyne, Glenmoriston, Inverness-shire. The car was straddling a burn about 90 feet (27 m) from the road. The tourists flagged down the next car to pass, whose driver turned out to be a doctor, Dorothy Messer, accompanied by her fiancé as well as David Coutts, an SNP Dundee councillor who knew McRae.

It was discovered that McRae was in the car. Dr Messer recalled that McRae still had his seatbelt on and that the car's door was wedged against the uneven ground. McRae was unresponsive with a wound to his temple, with blood clotted in his hair. Messer recalled "a strong smell of stale alcohol from him."

Another car was sent to call the emergency services. Dr Messer examined McRae and found that he was still alive and breathing. She noted that one of his pupils was dilated, indicating the possibility of brain damage, and estimated that he had been in that state for 10 hours. McRae was removed by ambulance to Raigmore Hospital, Inverness, accompanied by Dr Messer. After admission it was decided to transfer him to Aberdeen Royal Infirmary. At Aberdeen it was realised that the incident was more than a road accident; six hours after he had been found, a nurse washing his head discovered what appeared to be the entry wound of a gunshot. An X-ray confirmed that McRae had been shot above his right ear and a bullet was detected in his head. His brain was severely damaged and his vital functions very weak. The next day, Sunday 7 April, after consultation with his next of kin, McRae's life-support machine was switched off.

=== Investigation ===
The investigation was headed by Chief Superintendent Andrew Lister of Northern Constabulary CID, which initially proceeded in the assumption that McRae had been injured in a car accident. McRae's car was moved at 12:00 on 7 April, before the gunshot wound to his head had been found. It later transpired that the police had kept no record of the precise location where the car had been found, and the position stated by them was later found to be 1 mile (1.6 km) in error, and was corrected by a witness who had been present at the scene.

A weapon was found on Sunday 7 April, in a pool of water directly beneath where the car had been discovered. The gun was an antique and unlicensed Smith & Wesson .22 calibre revolver containing two spent cartridges and five remaining rounds. McRae's brother Fergus confirmed that the weapon was McRae's, and that he had acquired it in India during his war service. As the weapon was unlicensed, it was detained by the police and destroyed.

McRae's personal effects, comprising a bottle of whisky and a briefcase containing papers, were returned to his brother, who recalled that there was "nothing untoward or sinister in the paperwork, it was nothing that seemed unusual or special."

== Controversy ==
=== Conspiracy theories surrounding McRae's death ===
Although it was ruled at the time by authorities that McRae's death was a suicide, aspects of the investigation remain disputed. Neither McRae's medical reports nor the post-mortem data have been released to the public. There was no fatal accident inquiry. This and inconsistencies in police statements led to a conspiracy theory developing in Scottish Nationalist circles that McRae had been assassinated. The British security services, the nuclear industry, high-profile sex offenders, and drug smugglers were all named at various times as the supposed perpetrators. Allegations were made that McRae was under government surveillance; that the distance from McRae's car at which the gun was found and the lack of fingerprints on it rendered a suicide not credible; that McRae was shot twice and in the back of the neck rather than once in the temple; and that McRae was carrying incriminating papers that were not found with his body. These documents supposedly related to the dumping of nuclear waste from the Dounreay Nuclear Power Development Establishment, or an alleged paedophile ring in Westminster.

These claims were extensively investigated by the privately funded "Justice For Willie" campaign from 2015 to 2016, with the explicit aim of overturning the suicide verdict. It concluded that claims that McRae had been murdered were not credible and that there was little evidence for allegations that McRae had been under government surveillance or that documents had been removed from his body.

McRae's family always accepted that he had committed suicide, and rejected any suggestion that he had been murdered. His younger brother Fergus said in 2015; "There is no question in my mind of what happened. There was no murder or anything like that. I am absolutely positive about that. He did not discover anything that would have put his life at risk. There is no reason not to accept the official turn of events."

=== Early allegations of foul play ===
Winnie Ewing – then President of the SNP and herself an accomplished lawyer – was directed by the SNP's National Executive Committee (NEC) to conduct an internal investigation for the party to come to a conclusion as to whether Ewing "was satisfied or dissatisfied with the official version that he committed suicide". Having been refused access to police records of the investigation and rebuffed by both the Lord Advocate and the Procurator Fiscal in her attempts to conduct private, confidential meetings with them, Ewing, as she later wrote, came "up against a brick wall". Ewing reported to the SNP NEC that she was not satisfied with the official account of suicide: "I do not know what happened, but I think it is important that the truth emerges, despite the time that has passed. Why the State refuses to let the truth be known is a pertinent question."

In 1990, Willie McRae's younger brother Fergus, who had maintained silence since McRae's death, publicly expressed for the first time his conviction that McRae had killed himself. In a statement made through the family's solicitor, Fergus McRae said; "I believe that his death was investigated diligently and thoroughly by the police, who considered the possibility of murder, and that their findings leave no doubt." He concluded his statement; "Willie was certainly depressed, and openly spoke to me of contemplating suicide about a week before his death, and to a close friend only three days before his death. He spent much of his life trying to help people. May I ask all those who are simply helping others to besmirch his name, to remember this and to leave his memory in peace." Supporting Fergus McRae, Lord Fraser of Carmyllie, then the Lord Advocate, also wrote to Sir Nicholas Fairbairn, the Conservative MP for Perth and Kinross, who had expressed concern over the lack of a fatal accident inquiry. Contrary to established practice, Lord Fraser revealed further information about McRae's death to Sir Nicholas, and concluded that "the irresistible inference to be drawn from all the facts and circumstances surrounding this tragic death is that Mr McRae took his own life."

The same year, the republican pro-independence group Siol nan Gaidheal erected a cairn near the site of McRae's crash. The cairn's plaque reads; "Willie MacRae (sic). A Scottish Patriot Died Here On The Sixth Of April 1985. The Struggle Goes On".

In 1991, Channel 4 broadcast a "Scottish Eye" documentary investigating the mysterious circumstances of McRae's death. It found evidence to suggest that McRae had been under surveillance by UK intelligence services and that his death had likely involved foul play.

In 2005, Winnie Ewing's son Fergus, by then an MSP, requested a meeting with Elish Angiolini, Solicitor General for Scotland, to discuss allegations that have persisted that McRae was under surveillance at the time of his death. The request was rebuffed, with Angiolini claiming that he had not been under surveillance and that she was satisfied that a thorough investigation into the case had been carried out.

=== Statements by police officers ===
In July 2006, a retired police officer, Iain Fraser, who was working as a private investigator at the time of McRae's death, claimed that he had been anonymously employed to keep McRae under surveillance only weeks before he died. In November 2006 an episode of the Scottish Television show Unsolved examined the circumstances of McRae's death.

In November 2010, John Finnie, then SNP group leader on Highland Council and a former police officer, wrote to the Lord Advocate urging her to re-investigate McRae's death and release any details so far withheld. Finnie's request was prompted by the release the previous month of further details concerning the death of David Kelly. In January 2011 the Crown Office requested the files on the case from Northern Constabulary.

Also in November 2010, Donald Morrison, a former Strathclyde Police officer, alleged that McRae had been "under surveillance" by both Special Branch and MI5. Morrison claimed that he had collaborated with former colleague Iain Fraser to discover more about McRae's death. Morrison called for an enquiry into McRae's death and promised that he would give it a sworn affidavit that MI5 was involved. When interviewed by the Justice For Willie campaign in 2015-2016, Morrison's former police colleagues described him as "a "Walter Mitty" character who is capable of doing what he can to enhance his credibility or put him in the limelight for that fifteen minutes of fame."

=== Campaign for fatal accident inquiry ===
In July 2014, two unconnected plays by George Gunn and Andy Paterson about McRae's life and death, both coincidentally titled 3,000 Trees, were staged at the Edinburgh Festival Fringe. One of the plays explored his anti-nuclear campaigning, links with nationalist radicals and allegations that Special Branch and MI5 were surveilling him.

In April 2015, a petition was opened to hold a Fatal Accident Inquiry (FAI) on McRae's death. It attracted 6,500 signatures in 5 days. The petition eventually collected over 13,000 signatures and was handed in, in June 2015. The Crown Office rejected the proposal to hold a Fatal Accident Inquiry. On the same day, one of the journalists involved started crowdfunding for a book on the case titled 30 Years of Silence.

On the Easter weekend of April 2015, the 30th anniversary of McRae's death, Scotland on Sunday ran a story claiming that McRae's Volvo was moved back to the crash site by Northern Constabulary in an attempt to hide that the car had been moved before the bullet had been found – accounting for the discrepancies relating to the gun's distance from the car. The claims in this article were examined by the Justice For Willie campaign in 2016 and found to be misleading: claims that the car was removed and then returned to the scene were dismissed by witnesses and officers who attended at the time, and allegations that the gun was found several yards from the car were described by a police officer as "a load of rubbish".

=== Justice For Wille campaign and conclusion ===
Following the rejection of the petition for a Fatal Accident Inquiry by the Crown Office, a "Justice For Willie" Campaign group was set up by Mark MacNicol. The campaign decided to launch their own investigation since no official inquiry was forthcoming. The campaign was backed by crime novelist Ian Rankin and Taggart actor Alex Norton. Two private investigators, John Weir, a former detective chief inspector, and John Walker, a retired detective sergeant, were hired to re-interview original witnesses from the time of Willie McRae's death. The results were published in November 2016, and the campaign were unable to find any new evidence to undermine the official suicide verdict. MacNicol wrote on his website:

My conclusion, along with the majority of people on our campaign committee, is that there is no evidence that undermines the official Willie McRae suicide verdict. In fact we believe when considered collectively our new evidence reinforces it.

When I first heard of Willie in 2014 I couldn't believe what I was hearing relating to the circumstances surrounding his death. I've learned a valuable lesson. Like so many others I was taking what I was being told as facts (and then passing them on). Those 'facts' were the result of over 30 years of the Scottish equivalent of Chinese whispers.

MacNicol appealed for the McRae family, friends, and witnesses to be left in peace.

== See also ==
- The Impossible Dead, a crime novel by Ian Rankin inspired by allegations that McRae was murdered.

Party political offices
Preceded by Tom McAlpine	Scottish National Party Vice-Chairman (Administration); 1975–1983	Succeeded by Tom McAlpine
