= St Stephen's Church, St Albans =

Church in Hertfordshire, England

Coordinates: 51.7418°N 0.3484°W

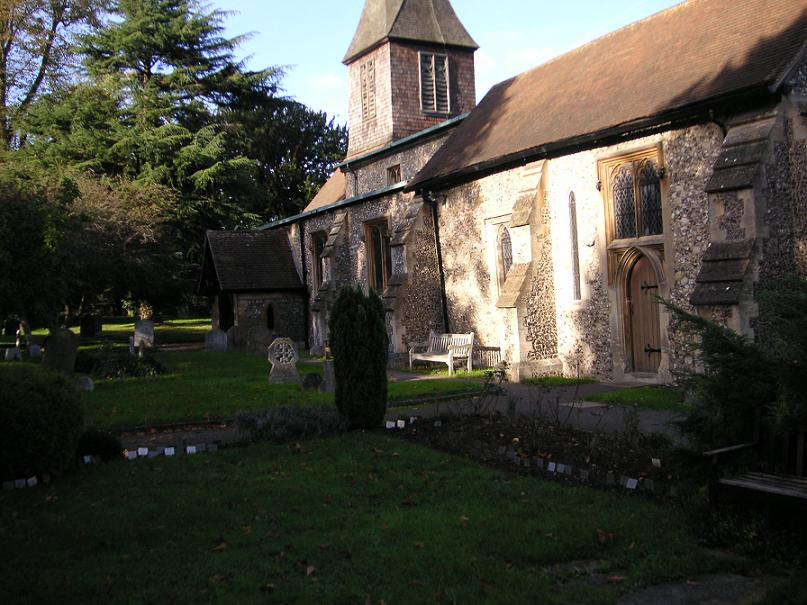
- St Stephen's Church, St Albans
- St Stephen's Church, St Albans
- Denomination: Church of England
- Churchmanship: Broad Church
- Website: St Stephen's Church, St Albans

History
- Dedication: St. Stephen

Administration
- Province: Canterbury
- Diocese: St Albans
- Parish: St Albans

St Stephen's Church is a Church of England parish church in St Albans, Hertfordshire, England. It is located to the south of the town centre, at the top of St Stephen's Hill (which leads down and then up Holywell Hill to the Abbey). It is a Grade II* listed building.

== History ==
It is, based upon the writing of Matthew Paris, believed to have been founded in AD 948 by Abbot Ulsinus of St Albans. Although there are now some questions about the exact date of its foundation (and the date of Abbot Ulsinus), it is reasonably clear that, together with St Michael's and St Peter's churches, the church was built at about that time to receive pilgrims and to prepare them for their visit to the shrine of St Alban within St Albans Abbey. The three churches, all of which still exist as active places of Christian worship, stand on the three main roads into St Albans.

The Anglo-Saxon building was built to be 34 feet (10 m) wide by 38 feet (12 m) long, and was probably divided into two rooms. It thought that the church did not at that time have a tower. Little now remains of that building, but the small window, deep set in rough masonry by the door to the Parish Centre, has been dated to around AD 950.

About 50 years after the Norman Conquest of 1066, the church was enlarged during the abbacy of Richard de Albini (Richard d'Aubeney). The new building was consecrated, around 1101 to 1118, by Gilbert, Bishop of Limerick. From documentary evidence it would appear that a north aisle was added in about 1170 whilst Robert de Gorron was abbot.

During the middle of the fifteenth century many works took place. A belfry was formed over the western bay of the south arcade. The height of the nave walls was increased and windows inserted at high level to allow more light to penetrate the interior of the church. This window feature is known as a "clerestory". The chancel was enlarged and the wooden framework of the chancel arch dates from this time.

The building today is largely medieval, but was restored from near-ruinous conditions in the 1860s by George Gilbert Scott. The present spire, replacing a "Hertfordshire spike" on the tower, dates from this time.

The parish and benefice of St Alban St Stephen are within the Diocese of St Albans.

== Architecture ==
The flint has dressing of stone and Roman brick with a tile roof. It consists of a nave with a south aisle and a chancel with a south chapel. There is a belfry over the west end of the nave. There is a ring of bells which were recast in 1957 to make them lighter as the previous bells, from 1892, were too heavy for the frame.

The pews and ornamental woodwork are Victorian, and the present pulpit and canopy date from 1936. The eagle lectern is a copy of a much earlier famous Dunkeld Lectern, which it replaced. The octagonal font is from the late 15th century. There is a 13th-century double piscina.

== Gallery ==
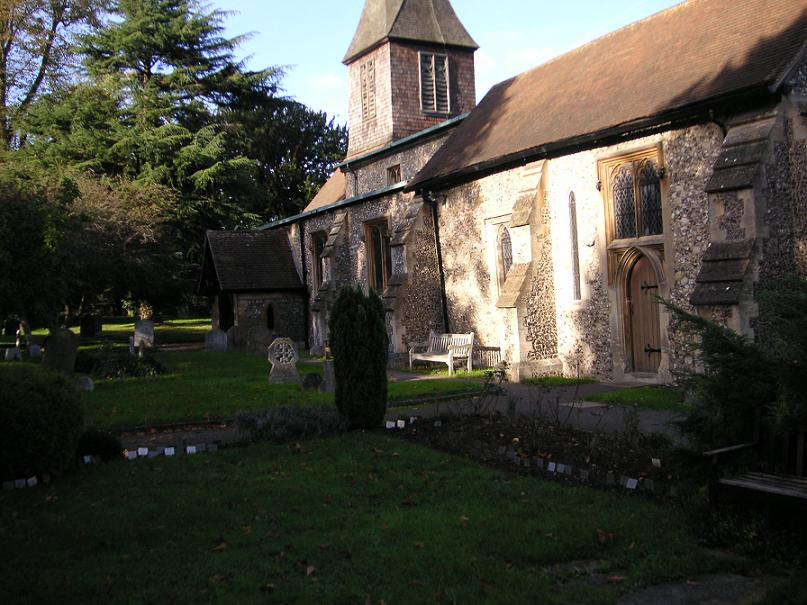

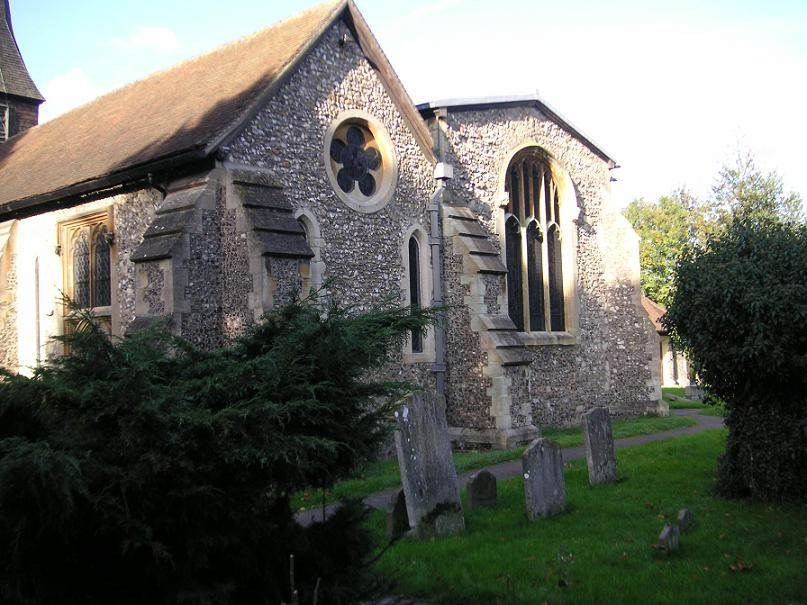

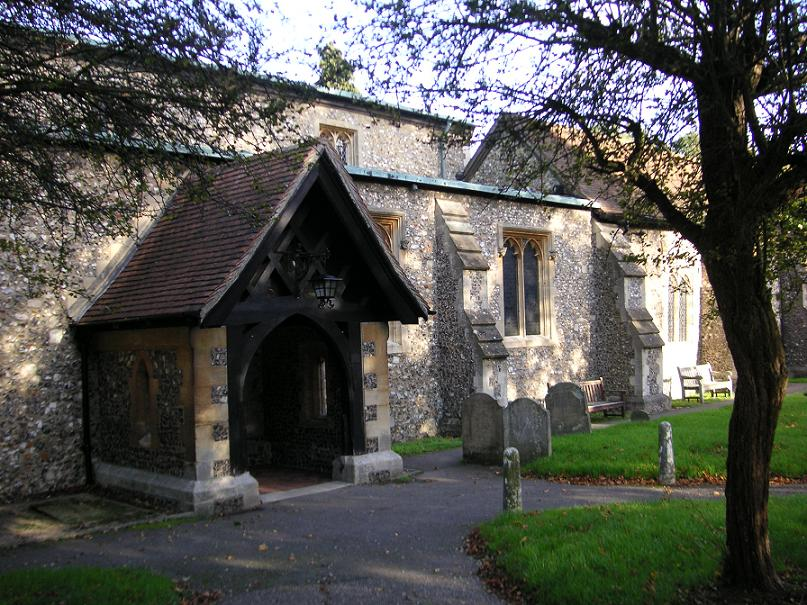

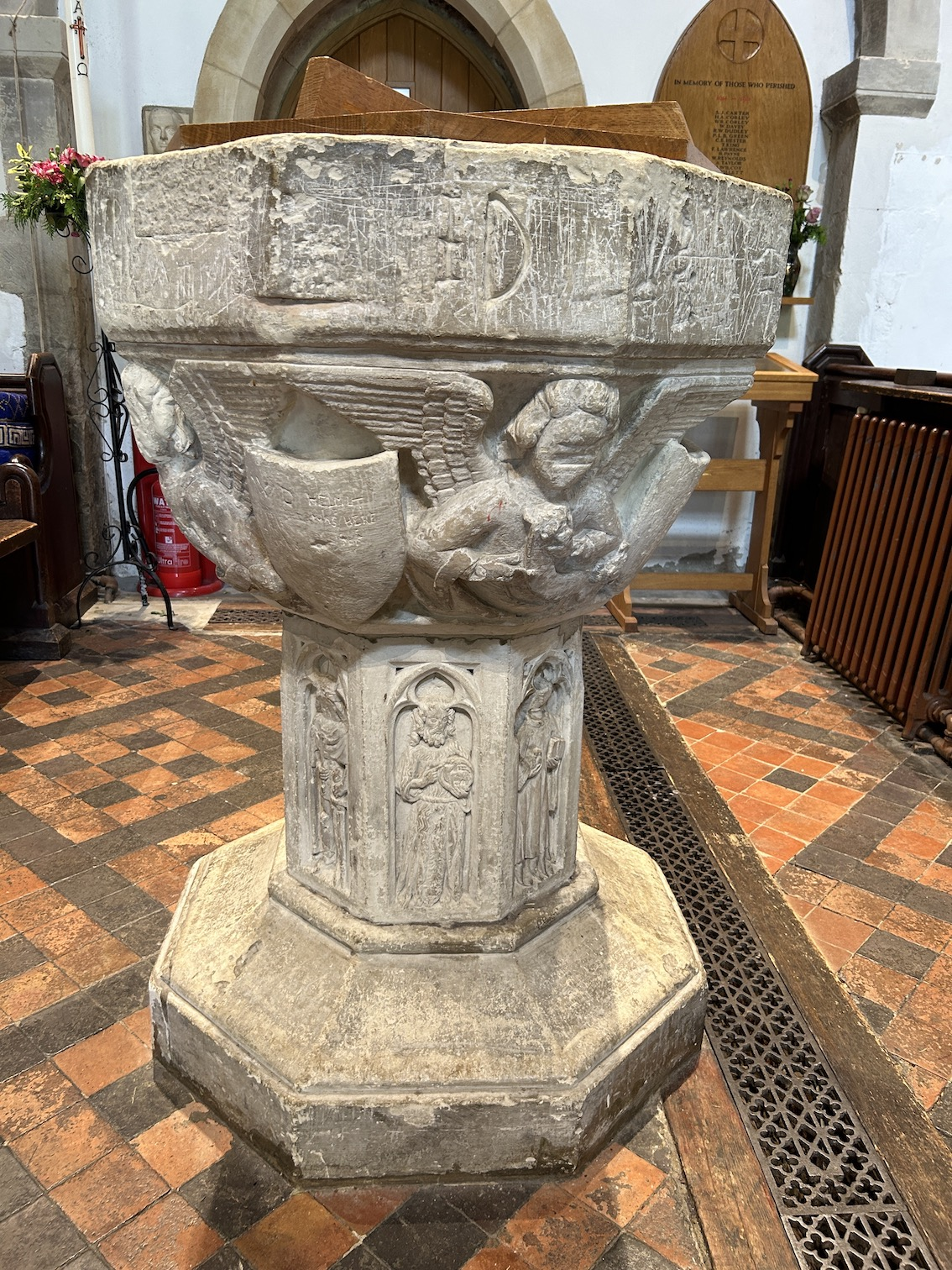

== See also ==
- Saint Stephen
- St Stephen, Hertfordshire
