= List of MPs for constituencies in Scotland (1970–February 1974) =

- Colours on map indicate the party allegiance of each constituency's MP.

This is a list of the 71 members of Parliament (MPs) elected to the House of Commons of the United Kingdom by Scottish constituencies for the Forty-fifth parliament of the United Kingdom (1970 to Feb. 1974) at the 1970 United Kingdom general election.

== Composition ==
Affiliation	Members
Labour Party	44
Conservative Party	23
Liberal	3
Scottish National Party	1
Total	71

== List ==
Constituency	MP	Party	Notes
Aberdeen North	Robert Hughes	Labour	
Aberdeen South	Iain Sproat	Conservative	
East Aberdeenshire	Patrick Wolrige-Gordon	Conservative	
West Aberdeenshire	Colin Mitchell	Conservative	
Dundee East	George Thomson	Labour	1973 by-election
Dundee West	Peter Doig	Labour	
North Angus and Mearns	Alick Buchanan-Smith	Conservative	
South Angus	Jock Bruce-Gardyne	Conservative	
Argyll	Michael Noble	Conservative	
Ayr	George Younger	Conservative	
Bute and North Ayrshire	Fitzroy Maclean	Conservative	
Central Ayrshire	David Lambie	Labour	
Kilmarnock	Willie Ross	Labour	
South Ayrshire	Jim Sillars	Labour	
Banffshire	Wilfred Baker	Conservative	
Berwick and East Lothian	John Mackintosh	Labour	
Caithness and Sutherland	Robert Maclennan	Labour	
Dumfriesshire	Hector Monro	Conservative	
East Dunbartonshire	Hugh McCartney	Labour	
West Dunbartonshire	Ian Campbell	Labour	
Dunfermline Burghs	Adam Hunter	Labour	
Kirkcaldy Burghs	Harry Gourlay	Labour	
East Fife	John Gilmour	Conservative	
West Fife	Willie Hamilton	Labour	
Inverness	Russell Johnston	Liberal	
Ross and Cromarty	Hamish Gray	Conservative	
Western Isles	Donald Stewart	SNP	
Galloway	John Brewis	Conservative	
Coatbridge and Airdrie	James Dempsey	Labour	
Glasgow Bridgeton	James Bennett	Labour	
Glasgow Cathcart	Teddy Taylor	Conservative	
Glasgow Central	Thomas McMillan	Labour	
Glasgow Craigton	Bruce Millan	Labour	
Glasgow Gorbals	Frank McElhone	Labour	
Glasgow Govan	John Rankin	Labour	1973 by-election
Glasgow Hillhead	Tam Galbraith	Conservative	
Glasgow Kelvingrove	Maurice Miller	Labour	
Glasgow Maryhill	William Hannan	Labour	
Glasgow Pollok	James White	Labour	
Glasgow Provan	Hugh Brown	Labour	
Glasgow Scotstoun	William Small	Labour	
Glasgow Shettleston	Myer Galpern	Labour	
Glasgow Springburn	Richard Buchanan	Labour	
Glasgow Woodside	Neil Carmichael	Labour	
Bothwell	James Hamilton	Labour	
Hamilton	Alexander Wilson	Labour	
Lanark	Judith Hart	Labour	
Motherwell	George Lawson	Labour	
North Lanarkshire	John Smith	Labour	
Rutherglen	Gregor Mackenzie	Labour	
Edinburgh Central	Tom Oswald	Labour	
Edinburgh East	Gavin Strang	Labour	
Edinburgh Leith	Ronald King Murray	Labour	
Edinburgh North	John Scott, 9th Duke of Buccleuch	Conservative	1973 by-election
Edinburgh Pentlands	Norman Wylie	Conservative	
Edinburgh South	Michael Hutchison	Conservative	
Edinburgh West	Anthony Stodart	Conservative	
Midlothian	Alex Eadie	Labour	
Moray and Nairn	Gordon Campbell	Conservative	
Orkney and Zetland	Jo Grimond	Liberal	
Roxburgh, Selkirk and Peebles	David Steel	Liberal	
Kinross and West Perthshire	Alec Douglas-Home	Conservative	
Perth and East Perthshire	Ian MacArthur	Conservative	
Greenock	Dickson Mabon	Labour	
Paisley	John Robertson	Labour	
East Renfrewshire	Betty Harvie Anderson	Conservative	
West Renfrewshire	Norman Buchan	Labour	
Stirling and Falkirk Burghs	Malcolm MacPherson	Labour	1971 by-election
Clackmannan and East Stirlingshire	Dick Douglas	Labour	
West Stirlingshire	William Baxter	Labour	
West Lothian	Tam Dalyell	Labour	

== By-elections ==
- 1971 Stirling and Falkirk by-election, Harry Ewing, Labour
- 1973 Dundee East by-election, George Machin, Labour
- 1973 Edinburgh North by-election, Alexander Fletcher, Conservative
- 1973 Glasgow Govan by-election, Margo MacDonald, SNP

== See also ==
- Lists of MPs for constituencies in Scotland
