= List of MPs elected in the 1970 United Kingdom general election =

1970–February 1974 Parliament of the United Kingdom
←	1966–1970 Parliament	February–October 1974 Parliament	→
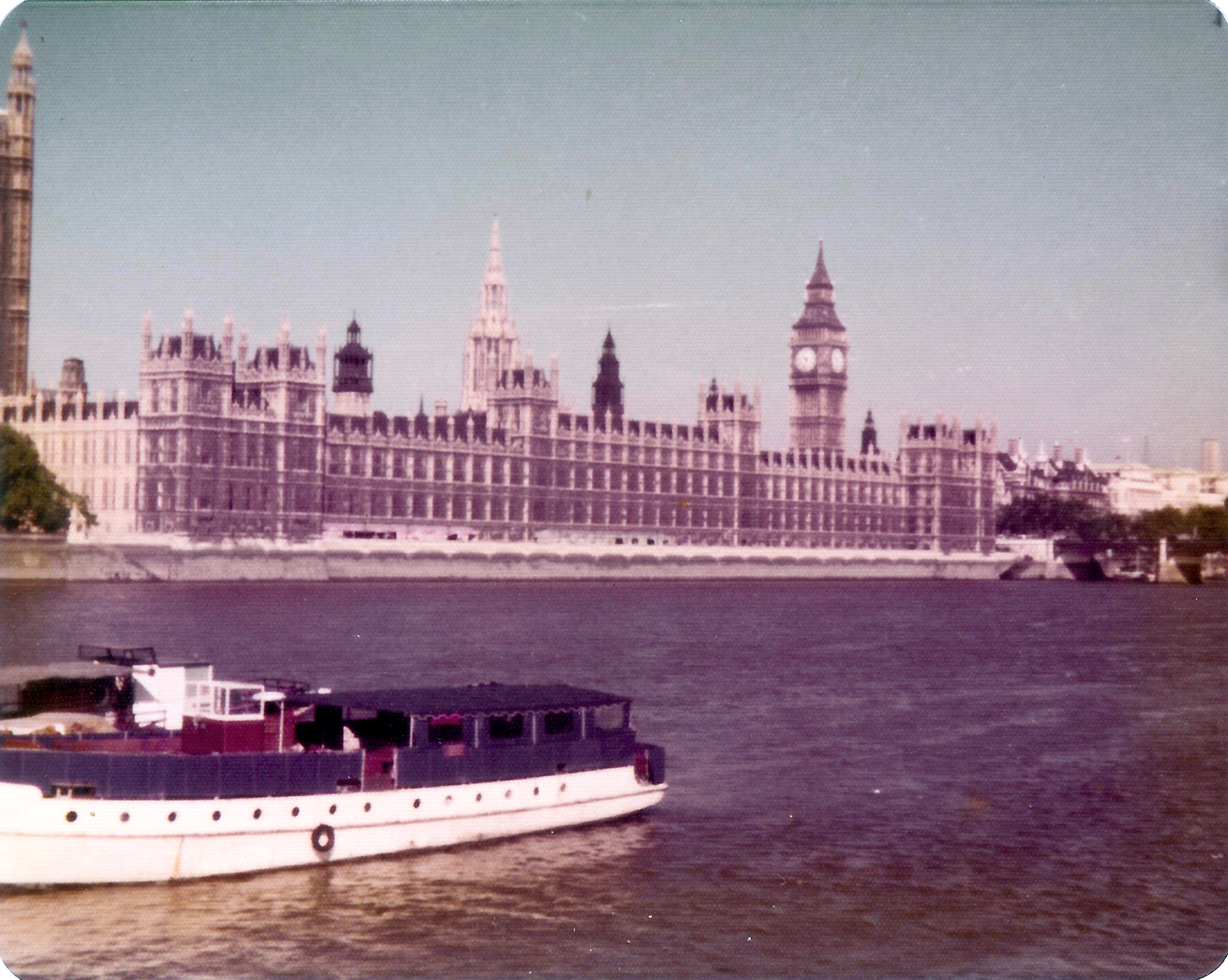
- Palace of Westminster in 1972

Overview
- Legislative body: Parliament of the United Kingdom
- Term: 18 June 1970 – 12 March 1974
- Election: 1970 United Kingdom general election
- Government: Heath ministry

House of Commons
- Members: 630
- Speaker: Horace King; Selwyn Lloyd
- Leader: William Whitelaw; Robert Carr; Jim Prior
- Prime Minister: Edward Heath
- Leader of the Opposition: Harold Wilson
- Third-party leader: Jeremy Thorpe

House of Lords
- Lord Chancellor: Baron Hailsham of St Marylebone

Crown-in-Parliament Elizabeth II

Sessions
- 1st: 29 June 1970 – 28 October 1971
- 2nd: 2 November 1971 – 26 October 1972
- 3rd: 31 October 1972 – 25 October 1973
- 4th: 30 October 1973 – 8 February 1974

This is a list of members of Parliament elected at the 1970 United Kingdom general election, held on 18 June.

== Composition ==
These representative diagrams show the composition of the parties in the 1970 general election.

Note: This is not the official seating plan of the House of Commons, which has five rows of benches on each side, with the government party to the right of the speaker and opposition parties to the left, but with room for only around two-thirds of MPs to sit at any one time.

Affiliation	Members
Conservative Party	330
Labour Party	288
Liberal Party	6
Scottish National Party	1
Unity	2
Protestant Unionist Party	1
Republican Labour Party	1
Independent Labour	1
Total	630
Effective government majority	31

This is a list of members of Parliament elected to the Parliament of the United Kingdom in the 1970 general election held on 18 June.

Notable newcomers to the House of Commons included John Prescott, Norman Tebbit, Ian Paisley, John Smith, Neil Kinnock, Kenneth Clarke, John Gummer, Alan Haselhurst, Dennis Skinner, and Gerald Kaufman.

Table of contents:

A B C D E F G H I J K L M N O P R S T U V W Y

== A ==
Constituency	MP	Party
Aberavon	John Morris	Labour
Aberdare	Arthur Probert	Labour
Aberdeen North	Robert Hughes	Labour
Aberdeen South	Iain Sproat	Conservative
Aberdeenshire East	Patrick Wolrige-Gordon	Conservative
Aberdeenshire West	Colin Mitchell	Conservative
Abertillery	Jeffrey Thomas	Labour
Abingdon	Airey Neave	Conservative
Accrington	Arthur Davidson	Labour
Acton	Nigel Spearing	Labour
Aldershot	Julian Critchley	Conservative
Altrincham and Sale	Anthony Barber	Conservative
Anglesey	Cledwyn Hughes	Labour
Angus North and Mearns	Alick Buchanan-Smith	Conservative
Angus South	Jock Bruce-Gardyne	Conservative
Antrim, North	Rev. Ian Paisley	Protestant Unionist
Antrim, South	James Molyneaux	Ulster Unionist
Argyll	Michael Noble	Conservative
Armagh	John Maginnis	Ulster Unionist
Arundel and Shoreham	Henry Kerby	Conservative
Ashfield	David Marquand	Labour
Ashford	Bill Deedes	Conservative
Ashton-under-Lyne	Robert Sheldon	Labour
Aylesbury	Timothy Raison	Conservative
Ayr	Hon. George Younger	Conservative
Ayrshire, Central	David Lambie	Labour
Ayrshire, North, and Bute	Sir Fitzroy Maclean, Bt.	Conservative
Ayrshire South	Jim Sillars	Labour
== B ==
Banbury	Neil Marten	Conservative
Banffshire	Wilfred Baker	Conservative
Barking	Tom Driberg	Labour
Barkston Ash	Michael Alison	Conservative
Barnet	Reginald Maudling	Conservative
Barnsley	Roy Mason	Labour
Barons Court	Ivor Richard	Labour
Barrow-in-Furness	Albert Booth	Labour
Barry	Sir Raymond Gower	Conservative
Basingstoke	David Mitchell	Conservative
Bassetlaw	Joe Ashton	Labour
Bath	Sir Edward Brown	Conservative
Batley and Morley	Sir Alfred Broughton	Labour
Battersea North	Douglas Jay	Labour
Battersea South	Ernest Perry	Labour
Bebington	Eric Cockeram	Conservative
Beckenham	Philip Goodhart	Conservative
Bedford	Trevor Skeet	Conservative
Bedfordshire Mid	Stephen Hastings	Conservative
Bedfordshire South	David Madel	Conservative
Bedwellty	Neil Kinnock	Labour
Belfast East	Stanley McMaster	Ulster Unionist
Belfast North	Stratton Mills	Ulster Unionist
Belfast South	Rafton Pounder	Ulster Unionist
Belfast West	Gerry Fitt	Republican Labour
Belper	Geoffrey Stewart-Smith	Conservative
Bermondsey	Bob Mellish	Labour
Berwick and East Lothian	John Mackintosh	Labour
Berwick upon Tweed	Antony Lambton	Conservative
Bethnal Green	William Hilton	Labour
Bexley	Edward Heath	Conservative
Billericay	Robert McCrindle	Conservative
Bilston	Robert Edwards	Labour
Birkenhead	Edmund Dell	Labour
Birmingham All Saints	Brian Walden	Labour
Birmingham Aston	Julius Silverman	Labour
Birmingham Edgbaston	Jill Knight	Conservative
Birmingham Hall Green	Reginald Eyre	Conservative
Birmingham Handsworth	Sydney Chapman	Conservative
Birmingham Ladywood	Doris Fisher	Labour
Birmingham Northfield	Raymond Carter	Labour
Birmingham Perry Barr	Joseph Kinsey	Conservative
Birmingham Selly Oak	Harold Gurden	Conservative
Birmingham Small Heath	Denis Howell	Labour
Birmingham Sparkbrook	Roy Hattersley	Labour
Birmingham Stechford	Roy Jenkins	Labour
Birmingham Yardley	Derek Coombs	Conservative
Bishop Auckland	James Boyden	Labour
Blackburn	Barbara Castle	Labour
Blackpool North	Norman Miscampbell	Conservative
Blackpool South	Peter Blaker	Conservative
Blaydon	Robert Woof	Labour
Blyth	Edward Milne	Labour
Bodmin	Robert Hicks	Conservative
Bolsover	Dennis Skinner	Labour
Bolton East	Laurance Reed	Conservative
Bolton West	Robert Redmond	Conservative
Bootle	Simon Mahon	Labour
Bosworth	Hon. Adam Butler	Conservative
Bothwell	James Hamilton	Labour
Bournemouth East and Christchurch	John Cordle	Conservative
Bournemouth West	John Eden	Conservative
Bradford East	Edward Lyons	Labour
Bradford North	Ben Ford	Labour
Bradford South	Thomas Torney	Labour
Bradford West	John Wilkinson	Conservative
Brecon and Radnor	Caerwyn Roderick	Labour
Brentford and Chiswick	Michael Barnes	Labour
Bridgwater	Tom King	Conservative
Bridlington	Hon. Richard Wood	Conservative
Brierley Hill	Fergus Montgomery	Conservative
Brigg	Lance Mallalieu	Labour
Brighouse and Spenborough	Wilfred Proudfoot	Conservative
Brighton Kemptown	Andrew Bowden	Conservative
Brighton Pavilion	Julian Amery	Conservative
Bristol Central	Arthur Palmer	Labour
Bristol North East	Robert Adley	Conservative
Bristol North West	Martin McLaren	Conservative
Bristol South	Michael Cocks	Labour
Bristol South East	Tony Benn	Labour
Bristol West	Robert Cooke	Conservative
Brixton	Marcus Lipton	Labour
Bromley	John Hunt	Conservative
Bromsgrove	James Dance	Conservative
Buckingham	William Benyon	Conservative
Buckinghamshire South	Ronald Bell	Conservative
Burnley	Daniel Jones	Labour
Burton	John Jennings	Conservative
Bury and Radcliffe	Michael Fidler	Conservative
Bury St Edmunds	Eldon Griffiths	Conservative
== C ==
Caernarfon	Goronwy Roberts	Labour
Caerphilly	Alfred Evans	Labour
Caithness and Sutherland	Robert Maclennan	Labour
Cambridge	David Lane	Conservative
Cambridgeshire	Francis Pym	Conservative
Cannock	Patrick Cormack	Conservative
Canterbury	David Crouch	Conservative
Cardiff North	Michael Roberts	Conservative
Cardiff South East	James Callaghan	Labour
Cardiff West	George Thomas	Labour
Cardiganshire	Elystan Morgan	Labour
Carlisle	Ronald Lewis	Labour
Carlton	Philip Holland	Conservative
Carmarthen	Gwynoro Jones	Labour
Carshalton	Walter Elliot	Conservative
Cheadle	Tom Normanton	Conservative
Chelmsford	Norman St. John-Stevas	Conservative
Chelsea	Marcus Worsley	Conservative
Cheltenham	Douglas Dodds-Parker	Conservative
Chertsey	Michael Grylls	Conservative
Chester, City of	John Temple	Conservative
Chesterfield	Eric Varley	Labour
Chester-le-Street	Norman Pentland	Labour
Chichester	Christopher Chataway	Conservative
Chigwell	John Biggs-Davison	Conservative
Chippenham	Daniel Awdry	Conservative
Chislehurst	Patricia Hornsby-Smith	Conservative
Chorley	Constance Monks	Conservative
Cirencester and Tewkesbury	Hon. Nicholas Ridley	Conservative
Cities of London and Westminster	Christopher Tugendhat	Conservative
Cleveland	James Tinn	Labour
Clitheroe	David Walder	Conservative
Coatbridge and Airdrie	James Dempsey	Labour
Colchester	Antony Buck	Conservative
Colne Valley	David Clark	Labour
Consett	David Watkins	Labour
Conway	Wyn Roberts	Conservative
Cornwall North	John Pardoe	Liberal
Coventry East	Richard Crossman	Labour
Coventry North	Maurice Edelman	Labour
Coventry South	William Wilson	Labour
Crewe	Scholefield Allen	Labour
Crosby	Graham Page	Conservative
Croydon North-East	Bernard Weatherill	Conservative
Croydon North-West	Robert Taylor	Conservative
Croydon South	Richard Thompson	Conservative
== D ==
Dagenham	John Parker	Labour
Darlington	Edward Fletcher	Labour
Dartford	Peter Trew	Conservative
Darwen	Charles Fletcher-Cooke	Conservative
Dearne Valley	Edwin Wainwright	Labour
Denbigh	Geraint Morgan	Conservative
Deptford	Hon. John Silkin	Labour
Derby North	Phillip Whitehead	Labour
Derby South	Walter Johnson	Labour
Derbyshire North East	Thomas Swain	Labour
Derbyshire South East	Peter Rost	Conservative
Derbyshire West	James Scott-Hopkins	Conservative
Devizes	Hon. Charles Morrison	Conservative
Devon North	Jeremy Thorpe	Liberal
Dewsbury	David Ginsburg	Labour
Don Valley	Richard Kelley	Labour
Doncaster	Harold Walker	Labour
Dorking	George Sinclair	Conservative
Dorset North	David James	Conservative
Dorset South	Evelyn King	Conservative
Dorset West	Simon Wingfield Digby	Conservative
Dover	Peter Rees	Conservative
Down North	James Kilfedder	Ulster Unionist
Down South	Lawrence Orr	Ulster Unionist
Dudley	John Gilbert	Labour
Dulwich	Samuel Silkin	Labour
Dumfries	Hector Monro	Conservative
Dunbartonshire East	Hugh McCartney	Labour
Dunbartonshire West	Ian Campbell	Labour
Dundee East	George Thomson	Labour
Dundee West	Peter Doig	Labour
Dunfermline Burghs	Adam Hunter	Labour
Durham	Mark Hughes	Labour
Durham North West	Ernest Armstrong	Labour
== E ==
Ealing North	William Molloy	Labour
Ealing South	Brian Batsford	Conservative
Easington	Jack Dormand	Labour
East Grinstead	Geoffrey Johnson Smith	Conservative
East Ham North	Reg Prentice	Labour
East Ham South	Albert Oram	Labour
Eastbourne	Sir Charles Taylor	Conservative
Eastleigh	David Price	Conservative
Ebbw Vale	Michael Foot	Labour
Eccles	Lewis Carter-Jones	Labour
Edinburgh Central	Thomas Oswald	Labour
Edinburgh East	Gavin Strang	Labour
Edinburgh Leith	Ronald King Murray	Labour
Edinburgh North	Earl of Dalkeith	Conservative
Edinburgh Pentlands	Norman Wylie	Conservative
Edinburgh South	Michael Hutchison	Conservative
Edinburgh West	Anthony Stodart	Conservative
Edmonton	Austen Albu	Labour
Enfield East	John Mackie	Labour
Enfield West	Iain Macleod	Conservative
Epping	Norman Tebbit	Conservative
Epsom	Peter Rawlinson	Conservative
Erith and Crayford	James Wellbeloved	Labour
Esher	Carol Mather	Conservative
Essex South East	Bernard Braine	Conservative
Eton and Slough	Joan Lestor	Labour
Exeter	John Hannam	Conservative
Eye	Harwood Harrison	Conservative
== F ==
Falmouth and Camborne	David Mudd	Conservative
Farnham	Maurice Macmillan	Conservative
Farnworth	John Roper	Labour
Faversham	Roger Moate	Conservative
Feltham	Russell Kerr	Labour
Fermanagh and South Tyrone	Frank McManus	Unity
Fife East	Sir John Gilmour, Bt.	Conservative
Fife West	Willie Hamilton	Labour
Finchley	Margaret Thatcher	Conservative
Flint East	Barry Jones	Labour
Flint West	Sir Anthony Meyer, Bt.	Conservative
Folkestone and Hythe	Albert Costain	Conservative
Fulham	Michael Stewart	Labour
Fylde North	Walter Clegg	Conservative
Fylde South	Edward Gardner	Conservative
== G ==
Gainsborough	Marcus Kimball	Conservative
Galloway	John Brewis	Conservative
Gateshead East	Bernard Conlan	Labour
Gateshead West	John Horam	Labour
Gillingham	Frederick Burden	Conservative
Glasgow Bridgeton	James Bennett	Labour
Glasgow Cathcart	Teddy Taylor	Conservative
Glasgow Central	Thomas McMillan	Labour
Glasgow Craigton	Bruce Millan	Labour
Glasgow Gorbals	Frank McElhone	Labour
Glasgow Govan	John Rankin	Labour
Glasgow Hillhead	Hon. Tam Galbraith	Conservative
Glasgow Kelvingrove	Maurice Miller	Labour
Glasgow Maryhill	William Hannan	Labour
Glasgow Pollok	James White	Labour
Glasgow Provan	Hugh Brown	Labour
Glasgow Scotstoun	William Small	Labour
Glasgow Shettleston	Myer Galpern	Labour
Glasgow Springburn	Richard Buchanan	Labour
Glasgow Woodside	Neil Carmichael	Labour
Gloucester	Sally Oppenheim	Conservative
Gloucestershire South	Sir Frederick Corfield	Conservative
Gloucestershire West	Charles Loughlin	Labour
Goole	George Jeger	Labour
Gosport and Fareham	Reginald Bennett	Conservative
Gower	Ifor Davies	Labour
Grantham	Joseph Godber	Conservative
Gravesend	Roger White	Conservative
Greenock	Dickson Mabon	Labour
Greenwich	Richard Marsh	Labour
Grimsby	Anthony Crosland	Labour
Guildford	David Howell	Conservative
== H ==
Hackney Central	Stanley Clinton-Davis	Labour
Hackney North and Stoke Newington	David Weitzman	Labour
Halifax	Shirley Summerskill	Labour
Haltemprice	Patrick Wall	Conservative
Hamilton	Alex Wilson	Labour
Hammersmith North	Frank Tomney	Labour
Hampstead	Geoffrey Finsberg	Conservative
Harborough	John Farr	Conservative
Harrogate	James Ramsden	Conservative
Harrow Central	Anthony Grant	Conservative
Harrow East	Hugh Dykes	Conservative
Harrow West	John Page	Conservative
The Hartlepools	Edward Leadbitter	Labour
Harwich	Julian Ridsdale	Conservative
Hastings	Kenneth Warren	Conservative
Hayes and Harlington	Arthur Skeffington	Labour
Hemel Hempstead	James Allason	Conservative
Hemsworth	Alan Beaney	Labour
Hendon North	John Gorst	Conservative
Hendon South	Peter Thomas	Conservative
Henley	John Hay	Conservative
Hereford	David Gibson-Watt	Conservative
Hertford	Lord Balniel	Conservative
Hertfordshire East	Derek Walker-Smith	Conservative
Hertfordshire South West	Gilbert Longden	Conservative
Heston and Isleworth	Barney Hayhoe	Conservative
Hexham	Geoffrey Rippon	Conservative
Heywood and Royton	Joel Barnett	Labour
High Peak	Spencer Le Marchant	Conservative
Hitchin	Shirley Williams	Labour
Holborn and St Pancras South	Lena Jeger	Labour
Holland with Boston	Richard Body	Conservative
Honiton	Peter Emery	Conservative
Horncastle	Peter Tapsell	Conservative
Hornchurch	John Loveridge	Conservative
Hornsey	Hugh Rossi	Conservative
Horsham	Peter Hordern	Conservative
Houghton-le-Spring	Thomas Urwin	Labour
Hove	Martin Maddan	Conservative
Howden	Paul Bryan	Conservative
Huddersfield East	Joseph Mallalieu	Labour
Huddersfield West	Kenneth Lomas	Labour
Huntingdonshire	David Renton	Conservative
Huyton	Harold Wilson	Labour
== I ==
Ilford North	Thomas Iremonger	Conservative
Ilford South	Albert Cooper	Conservative
Ilkeston	Raymond Fletcher	Labour
Ince	Michael McGuire	Labour
Inverness	Russell Johnston	Liberal
Ipswich	Ernle Money	Conservative
Isle of Ely	Harry Legge-Bourke	Conservative
Isle of Thanet	William Rees-Davies	Conservative
Isle of Wight	Mark Woodnutt	Conservative
Islington East	John Grant	Labour
Islington North	Michael O'Halloran	Labour
Islington South West	George Cunningham	Labour
== J ==
Jarrow	Ernest Fernyhough	Labour
== K ==
Keighley	Joan Hall	Conservative
Kensington North	Bruce Douglas-Mann	Labour
Kensington South	Brandon Rhys-Williams	Conservative
Kettering	Sir Geoffrey de Freitas	Labour
Kidderminster	Sir Tatton Brinton	Conservative
Kilmarnock	William Ross	Labour
King's Lynn	Christopher Brocklebank-Fowler	Conservative
Kingston upon Hull East	John Prescott	Labour
Kingston upon Hull North	Kevin McNamara	Labour
Kingston upon Hull West	James Johnson	Labour
Kingston upon Thames	John Boyd-Carpenter	Conservative
Kinross and West Perthshire	Sir Alec Douglas-Home	Conservative
Kirkcaldy Burghs	Harry Gourlay	Labour
Knutsford	John Davies	Conservative
== L ==
Lanark	Judith Hart	Labour
Lanarkshire North	John Smith	Labour
Lancaster	Elaine Kellett	Conservative
Leeds East	Denis Healey	Labour
Leeds North East	Sir Keith Joseph, Bt.	Conservative
Leeds North West	Donald Kaberry	Conservative
Leeds South	Merlyn Rees	Labour
Leeds South East	Stanley Cohen	Labour
Leeds West	Charles Pannell	Labour
Leek	David Knox	Conservative
Leicester North East	Tom Bradley	Labour
Leicester North West	Greville Janner	Labour
Leicester South East	Sir John Peel	Conservative
Leicester South West	Tom Boardman	Conservative
Leigh	Harold Boardman	Labour
Leominster	Sir Clive Bossom, Bt.	Conservative
Lewes	Tufton Beamish	Conservative
Lewisham North	Roland Moyle	Labour
Lewisham South	Carol Johnson	Labour
Lewisham West	John Gummer	Conservative
Leyton	Patrick Gordon Walker	Labour
Lichfield and Tamworth	James d'Avigdor-Goldsmid	Conservative
Lincoln	Dick Taverne	Labour
Liverpool Edge Hill	Arthur Irvine	Labour
Liverpool Exchange	Robert Parry	Labour
Liverpool Garston	Tim Fortescue	Conservative
Liverpool Kirkdale	James Dunn	Labour
Liverpool Scotland	Walter Alldritt	Labour
Liverpool Toxteth	Richard Crawshaw	Labour
Liverpool Walton	Eric Heffer	Labour
Liverpool Wavertree	John Tilney	Conservative
Liverpool West Derby	Eric Ogden	Labour
Llanelli	Denzil Davies	Labour
Londonderry	Robin Chichester-Clark	Ulster Unionist
Loughborough	John Cronin	Labour
Louth	Jeffrey Archer	Conservative
Lowestoft	Jim Prior	Conservative
Ludlow	Jasper More	Conservative
Luton	Charles Simeons	Conservative
== M ==
Macclesfield	Sir Arthur Vere Harvey	Conservative
Maidstone	John Wells	Conservative
Maldon	Brian Harrison	Conservative
Manchester Ardwick	Gerald Kaufman	Labour
Manchester Blackley	Paul Rose	Labour
Manchester Cheetham	Harold Lever	Labour
Manchester Exchange	William Griffiths	Labour
Manchester Gorton	Kenneth Marks	Labour
Manchester Moss Side	Frank Taylor	Conservative
Manchester Openshaw	Charles Morris	Labour
Manchester Withington	Sir Robert Cary, Bt.	Conservative
Manchester Wythenshawe	Alf Morris	Labour
Mansfield	Don Concannon	Labour
Melton	Mervyn Pike	Conservative
Meriden	Keith Speed	Conservative
Merionethshire	William Edwards	Labour
Merthyr Tydfil	S. O. Davies	Independent Labour
Merton and Morden	Janet Fookes	Conservative
Middlesbrough East	Arthur Bottomley	Labour
Middlesbrough West	John Sutcliffe	Conservative
Middleton and Prestwich	Alan Haselhurst	Conservative
Midlothian	Alex Eadie	Labour
Mitcham	Robert Carr	Conservative
Monmouth	John Stradling Thomas	Conservative
Montgomery	Emlyn Hooson	Liberal
Moray and Nairn	Gordon Campbell	Conservative
Morecambe and Lonsdale	Alfred Hall-Davis	Conservative
Morpeth	George Grant	Labour
Motherwell	George Lawson	Labour
== N ==
Nantwich	Robert Grant-Ferris	Conservative
Neath	Donald Coleman	Labour
Nelson and Colne	David Waddington	Conservative
New Forest	Patrick McNair-Wilson	Conservative
Newark	Edward Bishop	Labour
Newbury	John Astor	Conservative
Newcastle upon Tyne Central	Ted Short	Labour
Newcastle upon Tyne East	Geoffrey Rhodes	Labour
Newcastle upon Tyne North	William Elliott	Conservative
Newcastle upon Tyne West	Robert Brown	Labour
Newcastle-under-Lyme	John Golding	Labour
Newport	Roy Hughes	Labour
Newton	Frederick Newton	Labour
Norfolk Central	Ian Gilmour	Conservative
Norfolk North	Ralph Howell	Conservative
Norfolk South	John Hill	Conservative
Norfolk South West	Paul Hawkins	Conservative
Normanton	Albert Roberts	Labour
Northampton	Reginald Paget	Labour
Northamptonshire South	Arthur Jones	Conservative
Northwich	Sir John Foster	Conservative
Norwich North	George Wallace	Labour
Norwich South	Thomas Stuttaford	Conservative
Norwood	John Fraser	Labour
Nottingham Central	Jack Dunnett	Labour
Nottingham North	William Whitlock	Labour
Nottingham South	Norman Fowler	Conservative
Nottingham West	Michael English	Labour
Nuneaton	Leslie Huckfield	Labour
== O ==
Ogmore	Walter Padley	Labour
Oldbury and Halesowen	John Stokes	Conservative
Oldham East	James Lamond	Labour
Oldham West	Michael Meacher	Labour
Orkney and Shetland	Jo Grimond	Liberal
Ormskirk	Harold Soref	Conservative
Orpington	Ivor Stanbrook	Conservative
Oswestry	John Biffen	Conservative
Oxford	Montague Woodhouse	Conservative
== P ==
Paddington North	Arthur Latham	Labour
Paddington South	Nicholas Scott	Conservative
Paisley	John Robertson	Labour
Peckham	Freda Corbet	Labour
Pembrokeshire	Nicholas Edwards	Conservative
Penistone	John Mendelson	Labour
Penrith and the Border	William Whitelaw	Conservative
Perth and East Perthshire	Ian MacArthur	Conservative
Peterborough	Harmar Nicholls	Conservative
Petersfield	Joan Quennell	Conservative
Plymouth Devonport	Joan Vickers	Conservative
Plymouth Sutton	David Owen	Labour
Pontefract	Joseph Harper	Labour
Pontypool	Leo Abse	Labour
Pontypridd	Brynmor John	Labour
Poole	Oscar Murton	Conservative
Poplar	Ian Mikardo	Labour
Portsmouth Langstone	Ian Lloyd	Conservative
Portsmouth South	Bonner Pink	Conservative
Portsmouth West	Frank Judd	Labour
Preston North	Mary Holt	Conservative
Preston South	Alan Green	Conservative
Pudsey	Joseph Hiley	Conservative
== R ==
Reading	Gerard Vaughan	Conservative
Reigate	Geoffrey Howe	Conservative
Renfrewshire East	Betty Harvie Anderson	Conservative
Renfrewshire West	Norman Buchan	Labour
Rhondda East	Elfed Davies	Labour
Rhondda West	Alec Jones	Labour
Richmond (Surrey)	Anthony Royle	Conservative
Richmond (Yorks)	Timothy Kitson	Conservative
Ripon	Malcolm Stoddart-Scott	Conservative
Rochdale	Jack McCann	Labour
Rochester and Chatham	Peggy Fenner	Conservative
Romford	Richard Leonard	Labour
Ross and Cromarty	Hamish Gray	Conservative
Rossendale	Ronald Bray	Conservative
Rother Valley	Peter Hardy	Labour
Rotherham	Brian O'Malley	Labour
Rowley Regis and Tipton	Peter Archer	Labour
Roxburgh, Selkirk and Peebles	David Steel	Liberal
Rugby	William Price	Labour
Ruislip-Northwood	Petre Crowder	Conservative
Runcorn	Mark Carlisle	Conservative
Rushcliffe	Kenneth Clarke	Conservative
Rutherglen	Gregor Mackenzie	Labour
Rutland and Stamford	Kenneth Lewis	Conservative
Rye	Godman Irvine	Conservative
== S ==
Saffron Walden	Peter Kirk	Conservative
St Albans	Victor Goodhew	Conservative
St Helens	Leslie Spriggs	Labour
St Ives	John Nott	Conservative
St Marylebone	Quintin Hogg	Conservative
St Pancras North	Albert Stallard	Labour
Salford East	Frank Allaun	Labour
Salford West	Stanley Orme	Labour
Salisbury	Michael Hamilton	Conservative
Scarborough and Whitby	Michael Shaw	Conservative
Sedgefield	David Reed	Labour
Sevenoaks	John Rodgers	Conservative
Sheffield Attercliffe	Patrick Duffy	Labour
Sheffield Brightside	Edward Griffiths	Labour
Sheffield Hallam	John Osborn	Conservative
Sheffield Heeley	John Spence	Conservative
Sheffield Hillsborough	George Darling	Labour
Sheffield Park	Frederick Mulley	Labour
Shipley	Marcus Fox	Conservative
Shoreditch and Finsbury	Ronald Brown	Labour
Shrewsbury	Sir John Langford-Holt	Conservative
Skipton	Burnaby Drayson	Conservative
Smethwick	Andrew Faulds	Labour
Solihull	Percy Grieve	Conservative
Somerset North	Paul Dean	Conservative
South Shields	Arthur Blenkinsop	Labour
Southall	Sydney Bidwell	Labour
Southampton Itchen	Horace King	Speaker
Southampton Test	James Hill	Conservative
Southend East	Stephen McAdden	Conservative
Southend West	Paul Channon	Conservative
Southgate	Hon. Anthony Berry	Conservative
Southport	Ian Percival	Conservative
Southwark	Ray Gunter	Labour
Sowerby	Douglas Houghton	Labour
Spelthorne	Humphrey Atkins	Conservative
Stafford and Stone	Hon. Hugh Fraser	Conservative
Stalybridge and Hyde	Tom Pendry	Labour
Stepney	Peter Shore	Labour
Stirling and Falkirk	Malcolm MacPherson	Labour
Stirlingshire East and Clackmannan	Dick Douglas	Labour
Stirlingshire West	William Baxter	Labour
Stockport North	Idris Owen	Conservative
Stockport South	Maurice Orbach	Labour
Stockton-on-Tees	William Rodgers	Labour
Stoke-on-Trent Central	Robert Cant	Labour
Stoke-on-Trent North	John Forrester	Labour
Stoke-on-Trent South	Jack Ashley	Labour
Stratford-on-Avon	Angus Maude	Conservative
Stretford	Winston Churchill	Conservative
Stroud	Anthony Kershaw	Conservative
Sudbury and Woodbridge	Keith Stainton	Conservative
Sunderland North	Frederick Willey	Labour
Sunderland South	Gordon Bagier	Labour
Surbiton	Nigel Fisher	Conservative
Surrey East	William Clark	Conservative
Sutton and Cheam	Richard Sharples	Conservative
Sutton Coldfield	Geoffrey Lloyd	Conservative
Swansea East	Neil McBride	Labour
Swansea West	Alan Williams	Labour
Swindon	David Stoddart	Labour
== T ==
Taunton	Edward du Cann	Conservative
Tavistock	Michael Heseltine	Conservative
The Wrekin	Anthony Trafford	Conservative
Thirsk and Malton	Sir Robin Turton	Conservative
Thurrock	Hugh Delargy	Labour
Tiverton	Robin Maxwell-Hyslop	Conservative
Tonbridge	Richard Hornby	Conservative
Torquay	Sir Frederic Bennett	Conservative
Torrington	Peter Mills	Conservative
Totnes	Ray Mawby	Conservative
Tottenham	Norman Atkinson	Labour
Truro	Piers Dixon	Conservative
Twickenham	Toby Jessel	Conservative
Tynemouth	Dame Irene Ward	Conservative
== U ==
Ulster Mid	Bernadette Devlin	Unity
Uxbridge	Charles Curran	Conservative
== V ==
Vauxhall	George Strauss	Labour
== W ==
Wakefield	Walter Harrison	Labour
Wallasey	Ernest Marples	Conservative
Wallsend	Ted Garrett	Labour
Walsall North	William Wells	Labour
Walsall South	Sir Henry d'Avigdor-Goldsmid	Conservative
Walthamstow East	Michael McNair-Wilson	Conservative
Walthamstow West	Eric Deakins	Labour
Wandsworth Central	Tom Cox	Labour
Wandsworth Clapham	Bill Shelton	Conservative
Wandsworth Putney	Hugh Jenkins	Labour
Wandsworth Streatham	Duncan Sandys	Conservative
Wanstead and Woodford	Patrick Jenkin	Conservative
Warrington	Thomas Williams	Labour
Warwick and Leamington	Dudley Smith	Conservative
Watford	Raphael Tuck	Labour
Wednesbury	John Stonehouse	Labour
Wellingborough	Peter Fry	Conservative
Wells	Hon. Robert Boscawen	Conservative
Wembley North	Sir Eric Bullus	Conservative
Wembley South	Sir Ronald Russell	Conservative
West Bromwich	Maurice Foley	Labour
West Ham North	Arthur Lewis	Labour
West Ham South	Elwyn Jones	Labour
West Lothian	Tam Dalyell	Labour
Westbury	Dennis Walters	Conservative
Western Isles	Donald Stewart	Scottish National Party
Westhoughton	Tom Price	Labour
Westmorland	Michael Jopling	Conservative
Weston-super-Mare	Jerry Wiggin	Conservative
Whitehaven	Jack Cunningham	Labour
Widnes	James MacColl	Labour
Wigan	Alan Fitch	Labour
Willesden East	Reginald Freeson	Labour
Willesden West	Laurence Pavitt	Labour
Wimbledon	Michael Havers	Conservative
Winchester	Morgan Morgan-Giles	Conservative
Windsor	Alan Glyn	Conservative
Wirral	Selwyn Lloyd	Conservative
Woking	Cranley Onslow	Conservative
Wokingham	William van Straubenzee	Conservative
Wolverhampton North East	Renee Short	Labour
Wolverhampton South West	Enoch Powell	Conservative
Wood Green	Joyce Butler	Labour
Woolwich East	Christopher Mayhew	Labour
Woolwich West	William Hamling	Labour
Worcester	Peter Walker	Conservative
Worcestershire South	Sir Gerald Nabarro	Conservative
Workington	Fred Peart	Labour
Worthing	Terence Higgins	Conservative
Wrexham	Tom Ellis	Labour
Wycombe	John Hall	Conservative
== Y ==
Yarmouth	Anthony Fell	Conservative
Yeovil	John Peyton	Conservative
York	Alexander Lyon	Labour

== By-elections ==
- See the list of United Kingdom by-elections.

== See also ==
- Category:UK MPs 1970-1974
- List of MPs for constituencies in Scotland (1970–February 1974)
- List of MPs for constituencies in Wales (1970–February 1974)
