= 1910 Govan by-election =

UK parliamentary by-election

The 1910 Govan by-election was a parliamentary by-election held for the UK House of Commons constituency of the Govan Division of Lanarkshire on 28 April 1910.

== Vacancy ==
The by-election was caused by the appointment of the sitting Liberal Member of Parliament (MP), William Hunter KC as Solicitor General for Scotland. Under the Parliamentary rules applicable at the time if Hunter wished to remain an MP he had to resign and fight a by-election.

== Candidates ==
The Govan Liberals re-selected Hunter to try to retain his seat which he had held since the January 1910 general election when he obtained a majority of 1,429 votes and gained the seat from the Unionists.

It was reported that the Unionists were not eager to contest a by-election and that "as a matter of courtesy" Hunter might be allowed a walkover. An added consideration was that it seemed likely a new general election would be called within a few months. Representatives of the Conservatives and Liberal Unionists met on 21 April to discuss the by-election and decided not to put up a candidate.

Despite having contested the constituency at the previous general election, the Labour Party also chose not to oppose Hunter.

== Result ==
There being no other candidates putting themselves forward, Hunter was returned unopposed.

Govan by-election, 1910
Party	Candidate	Votes	%	±%
Liberal	William Hunter	Unopposed	N/A	N/A
Liberal hold				

== See also ==
- 1889 Govan by-election
- 1973 Glasgow Govan by-election
- 1988 Glasgow Govan by-election
- Lists of United Kingdom by-elections
- United Kingdom by-election records
