= Glasgow Govan by-election =

Glasgow Govan by-election or Govan by-election may refer to:

- 1889 Govan by-election, won by John Wilson of the Liberal Party
- 1973 Glasgow Govan by-election, won by Margo MacDonald of the Scottish National Party (SNP)
- 1988 Glasgow Govan by-election, won by Jim Sillars of the Scottish National Party (SNP)
