= Sir William Pearce, 1st Baronet =

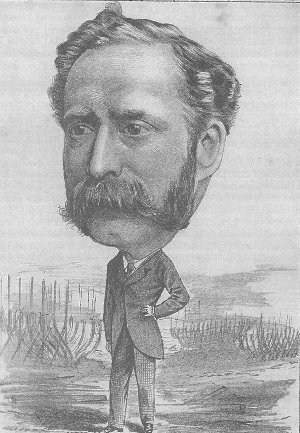
Contemporary caricature of Sir William Pearce

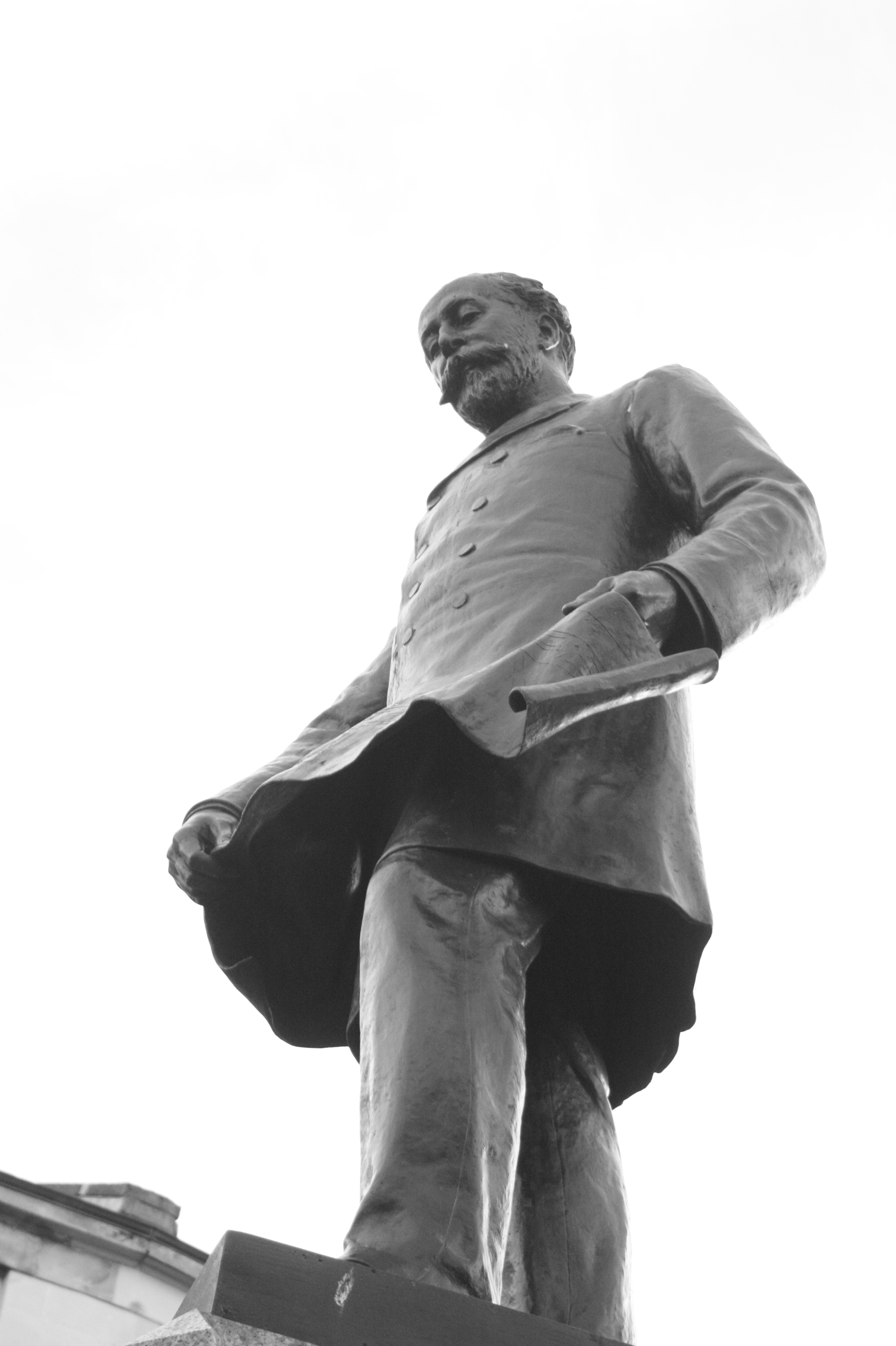
Statue of Sir William Pearce, Govan

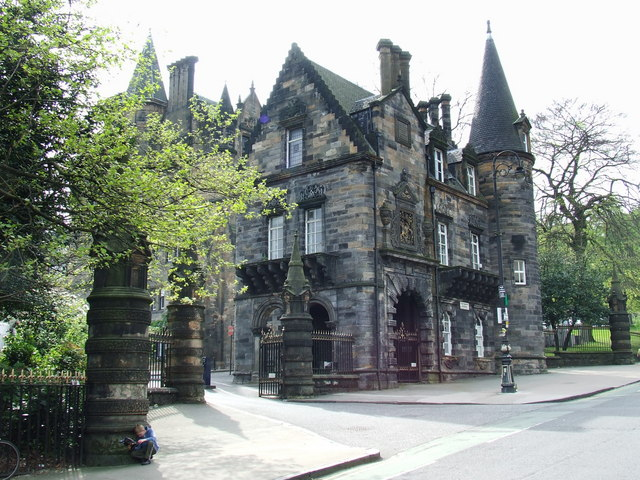
The Pearce Lodge at Glasgow University. The building was part of the original city centre campus and in 1870 was salvaged and brought to the new Gilmorehill campus in the west end due to the philanthropy of Sir William Pearce.

Sir William Pearce, 1st Baronet (8 January 1833 – 18 December 1888) was an English shipbuilder, under whose management the Fairfield Shipbuilding and Engineering Company in Govan on the River Clyde became the leading shipbuilding company in the world. He was later a Conservative Party politician.

== Career ==
Pearce was born at Brompton near Chatham in Kent, the son of Joseph George Pearce.

He trained as a shipwright and naval architect at the Chatham Dockyard. After supervising the construction of HMS Achilles, the first ironclad warship built in Chatham, he moved in 1863 to Scotland to take up the post of surveyor to the Lloyd's Register on the Clyde.

His career then developed rapidly. A year after arriving on Clydeside, he became general manager of Robert Napier and Sons, where he designed innovative fast, transatlantic liners for the Compagnie Générale Transatlantique. In 1869 he became a partner in John Elder & Co, and after the retirement of the other partners he became the firm's sole owner in 1878. In 1886, spending more time on his political career in London, he converted the business to a limited company, the Fairfield Shipbuilding and Engineering Company. Pearce remained as chairman.

Fairfield became a world leader in ship design and marine engineering, and was most famous for the development of the triple expansion engine. The shipyard and offices in Govan occupied a site of over 70 acres (28 ha), and employed up to 5000 workers. It built ships for the major shipping lines, including the Pacific Steam Navigation Company, the New Zealand Shipping Company, and the British and Africa Steam Navigation Company. Pearce was a major shareholder in the first of these clients, and was also chairman of the Guion Steamship Company, and of the Scottish Oriental Steamship Company.

In 1888 he got Fairfield's to build him a luxurious steam yacht for his own use: SY Lady Torfrida (545 tons). This was little used before his death and sold in 1890 to Bayard Brown who renamed it SY Valfreyia. It was sold again in 1928 to the Maharajah of Nawanagar and renamed Star of India.

== Politics ==
As one of Govan's leading businessmen, Pearce took up public office as a Commissioner (councillor) for the Burgh of Govan. He unsuccessfully contested the Glasgow constituency at the 1880 general election, but after the redistribution of seats he was elected at the 1885 general election as Member of Parliament (MP) for the new Govan constituency. His victory was narrow, with a majority of only 155 votes over his Liberal Party opponent.

Pearce was re-elected at the 1886 election with a slightly increased majority of 362 votes, and on 21 July 1887 he was made a Baronet, of Cardell in the County of Renfrew.

== Death and legacy ==
Pearce died suddenly at the age of 55 in his home on Piccadilly in London, on 18 December 1888. He is interred at Gillingham, Kent. An independent memorial was erected in Craigton Cemetery in south-west Glasgow. The monument was designed by the architects Honeyman and Keppie. Bronze plaques and a bust of Pearce were designed by sculptor Albert Toft. Standing near the entrance of the cemetery the impressive monument was robbed of its architectural bronzes in 1970 and ultimately demolished in 1976 due to its excessive vandalism.

He was survived by his wife Dinah Elizabeth Sowter, who was originally from Gravesend in Kent. Their only child was William George Pearce, who succeeded to the baronetcy.

His estate was valued for probate purposes at £1,069,669. His statue still stands at Govan Cross near the Pearce Institute, a building containing a public hall, library and other rooms, which was given to Govan by his widow.

Parliament of the United Kingdom
New constituency	Member of Parliament for Govan; 1885–1888	Succeeded by John Wilson
Baronetage of the United Kingdom
New creation	Baronet (of Cardell); 1887–1888	Succeeded by William Pearce
