= Jack Browne, Baron Craigton =

Scottish politician (1904–1993)

The Right Honourable The Lord Craigton CBE PC

Minister of State for Scotland
- In office 22 October 1959 – 20 October 1964
- Monarch: Elizabeth II
- Prime Minister: Harold Macmillan; Alec Douglas-Home
- Preceded by: The Lord Forbes
- Succeeded by: George Willis

Parliamentary Under-Secretary of State for Scotland
- In office 7 April 1955 – 22 October 1959
- Monarch: Elizabeth II
- Prime Minister: Winston Churchill; Harold Macmillan
- Preceded by: Thomas Galbraith
- Succeeded by: The Lord Strathclyde

Member of the House of Lords Lord Temporal
- In office 3 November 1959 – 28 July 1993; Life Peerage

Member of Parliament for Glasgow Craigton
- In office 26 May 1955 – 8 October 1959
- Preceded by: Constituency created
- Succeeded by: Bruce Millan

Member of Parliament for Glasgow Govan
- In office 23 February 1950 – 26 May 1955
- Preceded by: Neil Maclean
- Succeeded by: John Rankin

Personal details
- Born: 3 September 1904
- Died: 28 July 1993 (aged 88)
- Party: Conservative

Jack Nixon Browne, Baron Craigton CBE PC (3 September 1904 – 28 July 1993) was a Scottish Conservative politician.

== Early life ==
The son of Edwin Gilbert Izod, he adopted the surname Browne in 1920 as his family felt his more unusual surname a handicap.

Educated at Cheltenham College, Browne served in World War II as an Acting Group Captain in Balloon Command of the Royal Air Force. He was awarded the CBE in 1944.

Browne managed the Carntyne Greyhound Stadium, Glasgow, in the later 1920s. Whilst there he tried to "cash-in" on the new craze of 1928, dirt track racing. He built a racetrack inside the greyhound track. The venture was not successful, but as Jack Nixon-Browne he raced in both meetings he staged. He won most of his races in the second meeting as he had unlimited time to practice.

== Political career ==
He unsuccessfully contested the working-class constituency of Glasgow Govan in 1945, but was elected as Member of Parliament for the seat in 1950, holding it until 1955. He was then elected as Member for Glasgow Craigton in 1955, holding that seat until September 1959 at which point he was elevated to the House of Lords.

He was parliamentary private secretary to the Secretary of State for Scotland from 1952 until April 1955, when he was appointed a Parliamentary Under-Secretary of State for Scotland. In November 1959 he was created a life peer, as Baron Craigton, of Renfield in the County of the City of Glasgow.

In October 1959, he was promoted to Minister of State for Scotland, holding that office until October 1964. He was appointed a Privy Counsellor in 1961. He later held a number of important business positions, including chairman of United Biscuits Holdings, and was associated with environmental groups including the World Wildlife Fund.

== Arms ==
Coat of arms of Jack Browne, Baron Craigton
Crest A demi-knight in tilting armour Argent garnished Vert and helmet grilled Or with wreath of these liveries Argent and Vert and thereon for crest a plume of five feathers Gules Argent Gules Argent Gules holding in his dexter hand a crossbow bolt Or feathered Argent and in his sinister hand a garb Or banded Vert across his sinister shoulder. Escutcheon Per pale Argent and Or on a pale Sable between dexter three leopards' faces Vert and Sinister as many leopards' faces Gules a lion rampant of the first armed and langued of the fifth. Supporters Two knights in tilting armour Argent garnished Vert their helmets grilled Or and on a wreath of the liveries Argent and that on the sinister sustaining with his sinister hand a garb Or banded Vert resting upon his sinister shoulder. Motto Try Again

Parliament of the United Kingdom
Preceded by Neil Maclean	Member of Parliament for Glasgow Govan; 1950 – 1955	Succeeded by John Rankin
New constituency	Member of Parliament for Glasgow Craigton; 1955 – 1959	Succeeded by Bruce Millan
