= Robert Duncan (politician) =

Robert Duncan (5 October 1850 – 1925) was a Conservative politician in Scotland.

Prior to his political career, Duncan worked for Ross & Duncan engineers and boilermakers. He and his wife Mary Ann Jolly (1865–1929) had one son, the physicist William Jolly Duncan, and two daughters.

Robert Duncan was elected to the House of Commons as member of parliament (MP) for Glasgow Govan at the 1906 general election, but was defeated at the January 1910 general election.

Parliament of the United Kingdom
Preceded by Robert Hunter Craig	Member of Parliament for Glasgow Govan; 1906–January 1910	Succeeded by William Hunter
