= William Jolly Duncan =

Scottish aerospace engineer (1894–1960)

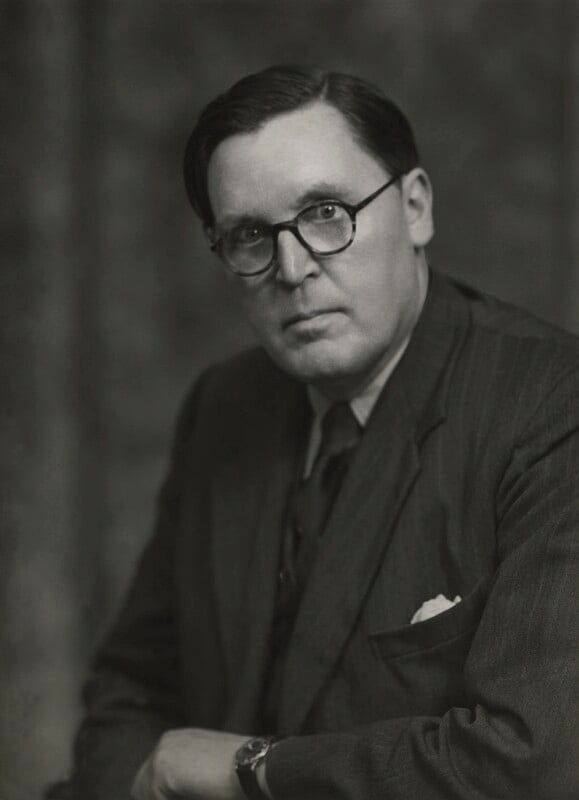
Duncan in 1954

William Jolly Duncan CBE FRS (26 April 1894 – 9 December 1960) was a 20th century Scottish physicist remembered as a pioneer of aeroelasticity and "air flutter" theory critical to modern aviation.

== Life ==
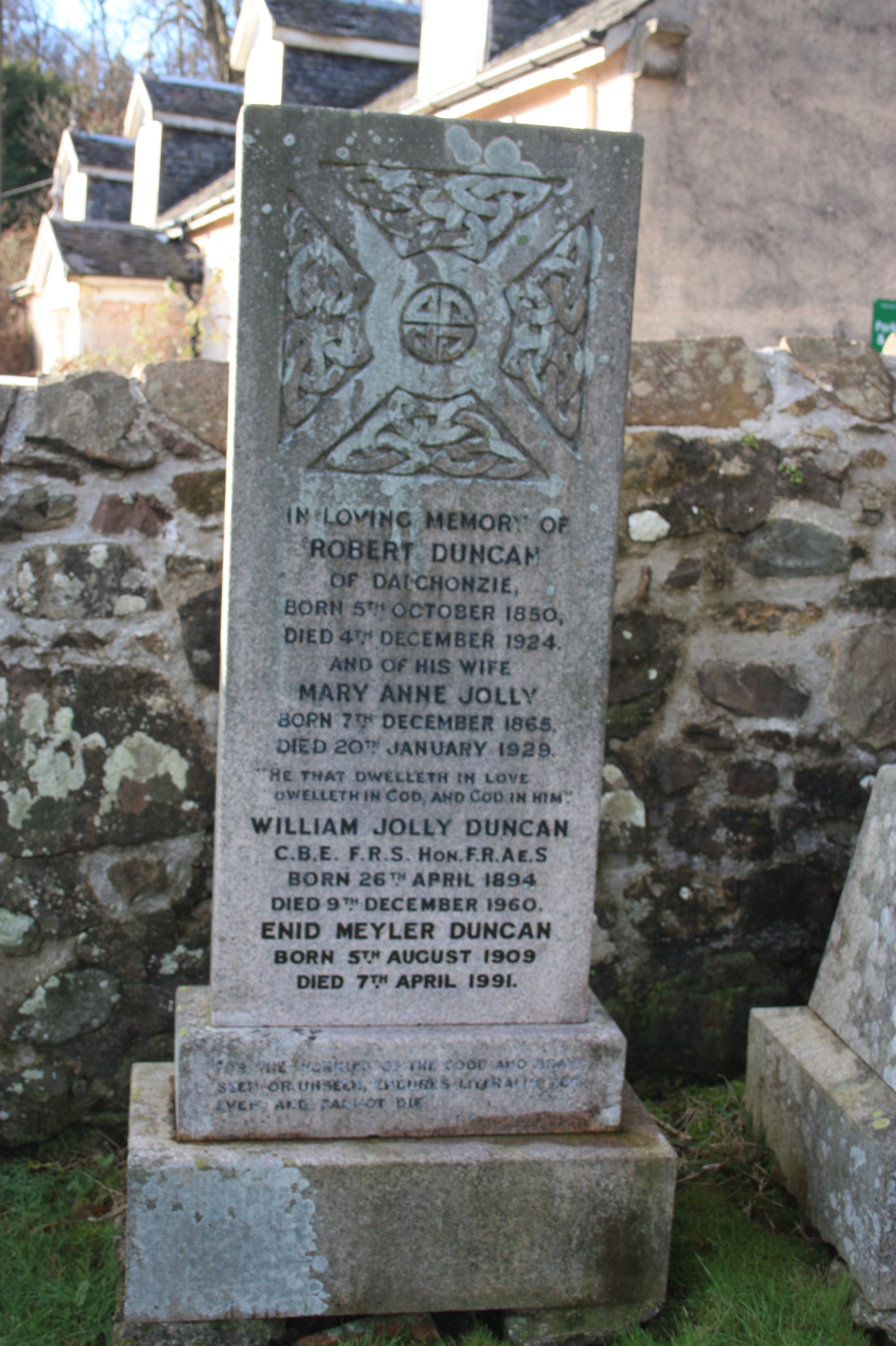
Duncan's gravesite at Old Logie Kirkyard near Stirling

He was born in Govan on 26 April 1894 the only son and eldest child of Robert Duncan, of Ross & Duncan engineers and boilermakers, and his wife, Mary Ann Jolly (1865-1929). He was educated at Allan Glen's School in Glasgow, then, when his father was elected MP for Govan, he was sent to boarding school in England, studying at Dulwich College before studying Engineering at University College, London under Prof J. D. Cormack.

In 1914 he enlisted at the start of the First World War serving in France and Flanders before being returned to Britain in 1916 to use his talents at the Aeronautical Inspection Unit of the Ministry of Munitions. After the war he worked with his father's firm of Ross & Duncan.

On the death of his father in 1924, he inherited the estate of Dalchonzie near Comrie. However, inheriting a partnership in the family firm did not hold his interest and he left in 1926 to join the Aerodynamics Department of the National Physical Laboratory. In 1934 he became first Professor of Aeronautics at University College Hull. In the Second World War he was attached to the Royal Aircraft Establishment and afterwards became Professor of Aerodynamics at the College of Aeronautics, Cranfield.

He was elected a Fellow of the Royal Society of London in 1947 alongside Sir Frank Whittle.

In 1950 he returned to his home city as newly created Mechan Professor of Aeronautics and Fluid Mechanics at Glasgow University, remaining in this post until death.

He died on 9 December 1960 a few weeks after a severe operation from which he did not recover. He is buried with his parents at Old Logie Kirkyard east of Stirling. The graveyard lies a few hundred metres north of the modern Logie Cemetery and Kirk. The grave lies in the north-west corner.

== Family ==
In 1936 he married Enid Meyler Baker (1909-1991), daughter of G. S. Baker of the William Froude Laboratory.

== Publications ==
- Elementary Matrices (1947)
- Flutter and Stability (1949)
- The Fundamentals of Flutter (1951)
