= Harry Selby =

British politician (1913–1984)

Harry Selby (18 May 1913 – 8 January 1984) was a Scottish Labour Party politician.

== Life ==
Harry Soldberg was born in Glasgow and educated at Queen's Park Secondary School. Early on in his life, he changed his name by deed poll from Soldberg to Selby. A barber by trade, he became an active Trotskyist, joining the Revolutionary Socialist League. When this disintegrated, he became a leading figure in the Left Fraction. This group followed a strict policy of entryism in the Labour Party, and although Selby was briefly expelled in the mid-1940s, he was soon readmitted. Following a split in the Left Fraction in 1948, Selby became its leader, and he and his supporters increasingly came to dominate the Glasgow Govan Constituency Labour Party. He was elected to represent Hutchesontown ward on Glasgow Corporation in 1972, serving until he stood down two years later.

Having allowed the Left Fraction to peter out, Selby was able to win the Labour candidature in the 1973 Glasgow Govan by-election. Much to his surprise, he lost the normally safe seat to Margo MacDonald of the Scottish National Party. After his loss, it was reported by The Glasgow Herald that Selby's selection had been met with criticism from some Labour members who had felt that, at the age of 61, he was too old to be starting a parliamentary career. The same newspaper reported that party workers had criticised the 83 Labour members of Glasgow Corporation for failing to support Selby's campaign. In response, the leader of the Labour group on the Council, the Rev. Geoffrey Shaw, admitted that there had been an element of complacency about the campaign, though argued that this was among the Labour Party as a whole, rather than just among councillors.

Selby stood again for the Labour Party in Glasgow Govan in the February 1974 general election, in which he took the seat by a narrow majority of 543 votes. He held the seat in the October general election but stood down in 1979.

Parliament of the United Kingdom
Preceded by Margo MacDonald	Member of Parliament for Glasgow Govan; 1974–1979	Succeeded by Andrew McMahon
