= 1911 Govan by-election =

UK parliamentary by-election

The 1911 Govan by-election was a Parliamentary by-election held on 22 December 1911. It returned one Member of Parliament (MP) to the House of Commons of the Parliament of the United Kingdom, elected by the first past the post voting system.

== Electoral history ==
General election December 1910: Govan Electorate 17,995
Party	Candidate	Votes	%	±%
Liberal	William Hunter	8,409	56.9	+13.9
Conservative	George Balfour	6,369	43.1	+9.4
Majority		2,040	13.8	+4.5
Turnout		14,778	79.9	−4.7
Liberal hold		Swing	+2.3	

== Result ==
The Liberal Party held the seat.

By-Election 22 December 1911: Govan Electorate 18,395
Party	Candidate	Votes	%	±%
Liberal	Daniel Holmes	7,508	53.5	−3.4
Conservative	George Balfour	6,522	46.5	+3.4
Majority		986	7.0	−6.8
Turnout		14,030	76.3	−3.6
Liberal hold		Swing	-3.4	

== Aftermath ==
A general election was due to take place by the end of 1915. By the autumn of 1914, the following candidates had been adopted to contest that election. Due to the outbreak of war, the election never took place.

General Election 1914/15: Electorate 22,559
Party	Candidate	Votes	%	±%
Liberal	Daniel Holmes			
Labour	Neil Maclean			

General election 14 December 1918: Electorate 31,652
Party	Candidate	Votes	%	±%
Labour	Neil Maclean	9,577	47.8	New
Unionist	Alexander McClure	8,762	43.8	+0.7
Liberal	Daniel Holmes	1,678	8.4	−48.5
Majority		815	4.0	N/A
Turnout		20,017	63.2	−16.7
Labour gain from Liberal		Swing		

- McClure was the endorsed candidate of the Coalition Government.
