= Margo MacDonald =

Scottish politician (1943–2014)

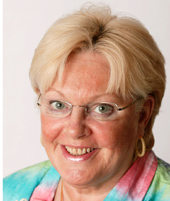
- MacDonald in 2011

Member of the Scottish Parliament for Lothian Lothians (1999–2011) (1 of 7 Regional MSPs)
- In office 6 May 1999 – 4 April 2014

Depute Leader of the Scottish National Party
- In office 1974–1979
- Leader: William Wolfe
- Preceded by: Gordon Wilson
- Succeeded by: Douglas Henderson

Member of Parliament for Glasgow Govan
- In office 8 November 1973 – 8 February 1974
- Preceded by: John Rankin
- Succeeded by: Harry Selby

Personal details
- Born: Margo Symington Aitken; 19 April 1943 Hamilton, Lanarkshire, Scotland
- Died: 4 April 2014 (aged 70) Edinburgh, Scotland
- Party: Independent (2003–2014); Scottish National Party (1973–2003)
- Spouses: Peter MacDonald (m. 1965; div. 1980) Jim Sillars (m. 1981)
- Children: 2
- Education: Dunfermline College of Physical Education
- Occupation: Politician, Teacher, Broadcaster

Margo Symington MacDonald (née Aitken; 19 April 1943 – 4 April 2014) was a Scottish politician, teacher and broadcaster. She was the Scottish National Party (SNP) Member of Parliament (MP) for Glasgow Govan from 1973 to 1974 and was Depute Leader of the Scottish National Party from 1974 to 1979. She later served as an SNP and then Independent Member of the Scottish Parliament (MSP) for Lothian from 1999 until her death.

== Background ==
Margo Symington Aitken was born in Hamilton, South Lanarkshire, and grew up in and around East Kilbride, one of three siblings.

Her mother, Jean, was a nurse, and her father, Robert, was described as a "very cruel" man from whom her mother separated when Margo was 12 years old. She was educated at Hamilton Academy, and trained as a teacher of physical education at Dunfermline College of Physical Education immediately after leaving school.

== Family ==
She married her first husband, Peter MacDonald, in 1965, and they ran a Blantyre pub, the Barnhill Tavern (known locally as The Hoolet's Nest), together. The MacDonalds had two daughters, Petra and Zoe, before the marriage ended in divorce.

Her second marriage was to politician and columnist Jim Sillars, whom she married in 1981. Sillars went on to win the 1988 Glasgow Govan by-election for the SNP. Petra MacDonald married Craig Reid of the Proclaimers; the Reids have four children.

== Parliamentary career ==
A committed and vocal supporter of Scottish independence, MacDonald entered parliamentary politics by winning the 1973 Glasgow Govan by-election as an SNP candidate at 30 years old. There were "scenes of near-hysteria by supporters" as she was declared the winner in what had, until then, been a Labour stronghold. Her election, during the last months of the Conservative Heath government, "overturned the theory that the SNP can thrive only [...] when a Labour Government is in office".

She has alleged that her election to the House of Commons was followed by KGB and CIA agents taking her for lunch while posing as journalists, and believed the SNP was infiltrated during the 1970s by MI5 agents worried booming North Sea oil revenues could lead to independence.

She failed to retain her seat in the following general election of February 1974, but became Deputy Leader of the SNP that year. At a December 1974 National Council meeting, MacDonald criticised the SNP for failing to win seats from Labour in industrial Scotland and urged the party to move to the left to compete. She had already been selected as the SNP candidate in Hamilton when the death of the MP led to the 1978 Hamilton by-election, which she lost. At the 1979 general election she was an unsuccessful candidate in Glasgow Shettleston.

A staunch left-winger, she was one of three prominent spokespersons for the socialist 79 Group, which ultimately resulted in her failure to be re-elected as Deputy Leader at the party's 1979 conference. In 1982, Margo resigned from the SNP in protest of the 79 Group's proscription. She began to establish herself as a forceful and respected presenter of various radio and television programmes, including the short-lived Colour Supplement for Radio 4 in the mid-1980s. She contributed regularly to Scottish newspapers including the Edinburgh Evening News near the end of her life.

By the mid-1990s, she had returned to the SNP and in 1999 she was elected to the Scottish Parliament, representing the Lothians. She earned a high media profile by her outspoken views on a number of issues, including sex workers' rights and MSPs' salaries. She quickly established herself as a rebel within the party, and was disciplined in 2000 for missing a parliamentary vote without permission and briefing a Sunday newspaper against party policy. Meanwhile, she lost influence with the party leadership, firstly under Alex Salmond and then John Swinney, for being in the SNP Fundamentalist mould and having supported Alex Neil in the party leadership election in 2000.

In 2002, MacDonald was ranked fifth on the SNP list for Lothians for the 2003 Parliament election, effectively ending her chances of being re-elected as an SNP MSP. In response, there were a spate of resignations from the party, and MacDonald decided to instead stand as an independent. For this, she was officially expelled from the SNP on 28 January 2003. Her diagnosis with Parkinson's disease became public knowledge at this time, ostensibly in an effort to diminish her electoral prospects. MacDonald, who had known about the diagnosis for six years, said it had been leaked to the press by "forces of darkness" in the SNP, but a spokesperson insisted that the leak did not come from within the party.

She was re-elected as an independent MSP at the 2003 Scottish Parliament election, and again in 2007 and 2011. After her 2007 re-election MacDonald stood to become Presiding Officer, but lost the ballot to Alex Fergusson. During her time in parliament as an independent politician, she championed controversial causes, including the legalisation of assisted suicide.

In the run-up to the 2014 Scottish independence referendum, MacDonald asked the UK's Security Service for assurances they would not interfere in the referendum process, suggesting that the security services "have people in the SNP".

== Death ==
Margo died at her home in Edinburgh on 4 April 2014, aged 70. As she was elected as an independent regional MSP, according to the provisions of the Scotland Act 1998, her seat was left vacant until the 2016 Scottish Parliament election. Shortly after her death, it was confirmed that political leaders would pay tribute to her at a special session of the parliament.

== My Right to Die ==
In July 2008, MacDonald co-operated with BBC Scotland in the making of a documentary about assisted dying. As someone with Parkinson's, MacDonald had long been a campaigner for assisted dying, saying that

"As someone with a degenerative condition – Parkinson's – this debate is not a theory with me. The possibility of having the worst form of the disease at the end of life has made me think about unpleasant things. I feel strongly that, in the event of losing my dignity or being faced with the prospect of a painful or protracted death, I should have the right to choose to curtail my own, and my family's, suffering."

In the programme, MacDonald travelled around Scotland and met fellow "sufferers" and investigated the pros and cons of assisted dying, later stating that

"Online, euthanasia campaigners show viewers how to make an 'exit hood' to end your life, and I know people with terminal illnesses now make the awful trip to Mexico to buy lethal doses of drugs to take their own lives, all because of our current laws. I am in no doubt that our legal system must change."

== See also ==
- List of United Kingdom MPs with the shortest service

Parliament of the United Kingdom
Preceded by John Rankin	Member of Parliament for Glasgow Govan; 1973–Feb 1974	Succeeded by Harry Selby
Scottish Parliament
New constituency	Member of the Scottish Parliament for Lothian; Lothians (1999–2011); 1999–2014	Vacant
Party political offices
Preceded by Gordon Murray	Scottish National Party Vice Chairman (Policy); 1972–1974	Succeeded by Arthur Donaldson
Preceded by Gordon Wilson	Senior Vice-Chairman (Depute Leader) of the Scottish National Party; 1974–79	Succeeded by Douglas Henderson
