= Robert Hunter Craig =

Scottish politician

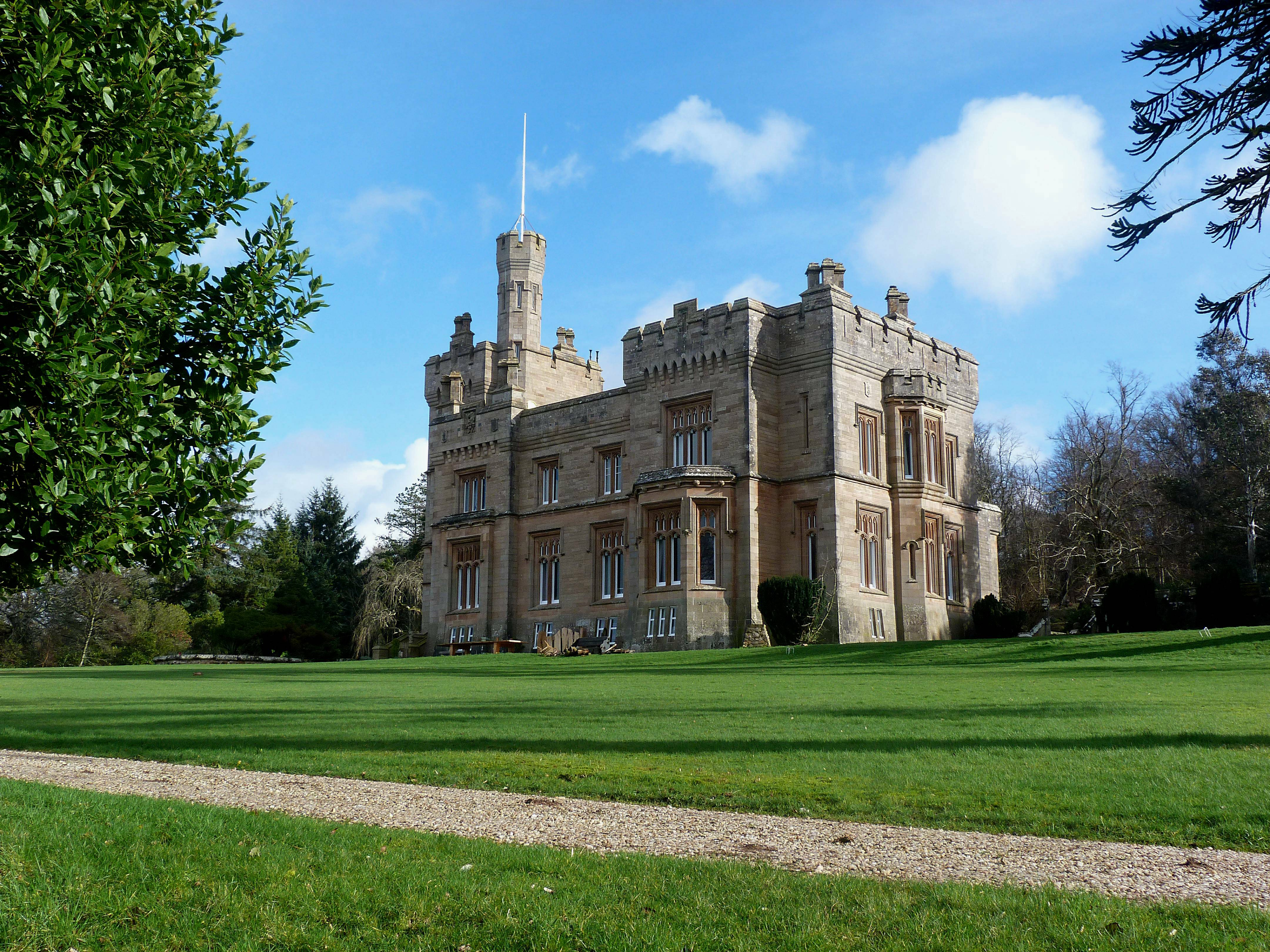
Knock Castle

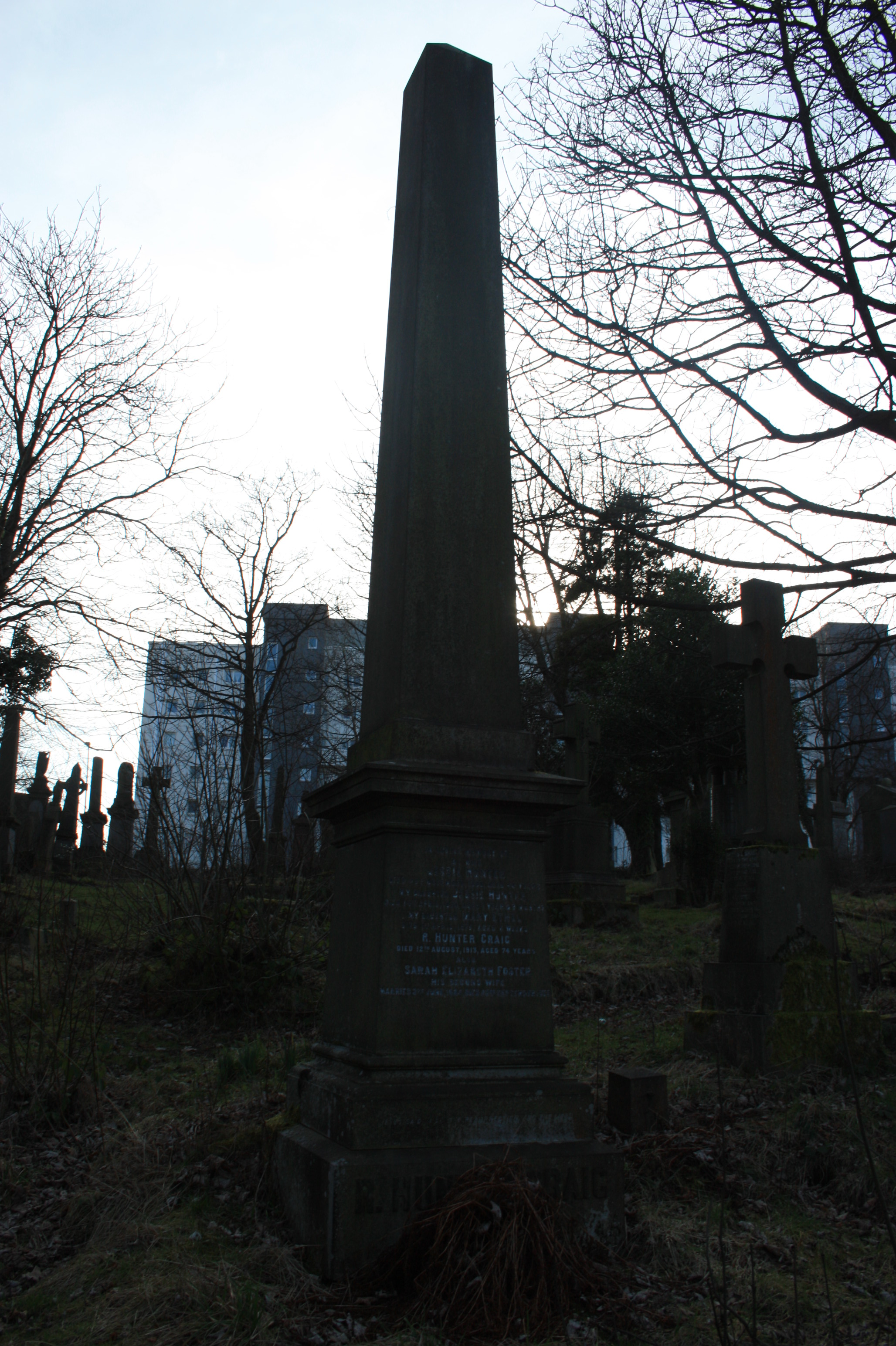
The grave of Robert Hunter Craig, Craigton Cemetery, Glasgow

Robert Hunter Craig (1839 – 12 August 1913) was a Liberal Party politician in Scotland.

He was elected to the House of Commons as member of parliament (MP) for Glasgow Govan at the 1900 general election, but did not stand again at the 1906 general election.

== Life ==
He was born in Partick, the son of James Craig and Margaret Brown. He was educated at Partick Academy then Glasgow Academy.

In 1873 he founded R. Hunter Craig & Co, agents to flour millers, at 67 Hope Street in Glasgow city centre, later expanding to Liverpool and London. Hunter Craig then lived at Falkland Bank on Partick Hill.

He was Director of the Scottish Temperance Life Assurance Company, President of the Glasgow Mizpah Band and Director of the Glasgow Limited Evangelical Society.

By 1911 his company was described as R Hunter Craig & Co Ltd, Continental, American and Colonial Flour and Produce Importers, based at Atlantic Chambers 45 Hope Street in Glasgow, with further offices in Edinburgh, Leith, London, Liverpool, Belfast, Dublin and Cork. Hunter Craig was then living at Knock Castle, Largs.

He is buried in Craigton Cemetery in Glasgow. The grave lies on the north slope of the southern section.

Parliament of the United Kingdom
Preceded by John Wilson	Member of Parliament for Glasgow Govan; 1900 – 1906	Succeeded by Robert Duncan
