= Andrew McMahon (politician) =

Andrew McMahon (18 March 1920 – 26 April 2005) was a British Labour politician. He was the Member of Parliament for Glasgow Govan from 1979 to 1983, when he retired due to constituency boundary changes. His successor was Bruce Millan.

Parliament of the United Kingdom
Preceded by Harry Selby	Member of Parliament for Glasgow Govan; 1979–1983	Succeeded by Bruce Millan
