= Millan Committee =

The Millan Committee was established in 1999 by the Scottish Parliament to review the law on mental health in Scotland. Bruce Millan was the chair of the committee. It reported in 2001.

Its report was the basis of the Mental Health (Care and Treatment) (Scotland) Act 2003.
