= Daniel Holmes =

Scottish Liberal Party politician

Daniel Turner Holmes (23 February 1863 – 7 April 1955) was a Scottish Liberal Party politician who sat in the House of Commons from 1911 to 1918 as the Member of Parliament (MP) for Govan.

Holmes was educated at the University of London, the University of Geneva and the University of Paris. He was an assistant examiner at the University of London, taught at Greenock Academy and Paisley Grammar School, and wrote and lectured on literature before becoming an MP.

Holmes was elected to parliament at the 1911 by-election in Govan, caused by the appointment of the Liberal incumbent William Hunter as a Judge of the Court of Session. Holmes was elected by a margin of 936, a majority more than 1000 votes less than that of his predecessor. A key issue in the contest was the National Insurance Act which Holmes supported. He made his maiden speech in the House of Commons on 1 April 1912 in a debate on the Temperance (Scotland) Bill.

He married Margaret Eadie (died 1953) in 1896. Their older daughter, Margaret, married William Wedgewood Benn in 1920, and the parliamentary connection continued in the following generation with Tony Benn. His great-grandson is former cabinet minister Hilary Benn. Their youngest daughter, Hermione, married John Laurence Lister of Pietermaritzburg, South Africa, in 1936.

== Works ==
- Literary tours in the Highlands and islands of Scotland, 1909
- A Scot in France and Switzerland, 1910

Parliament of the United Kingdom
Preceded by William Hunter	Member of Parliament for Govan; 1911–1918	Succeeded by Neil Maclean
