= Alexander Fletcher (British politician) =

British politician

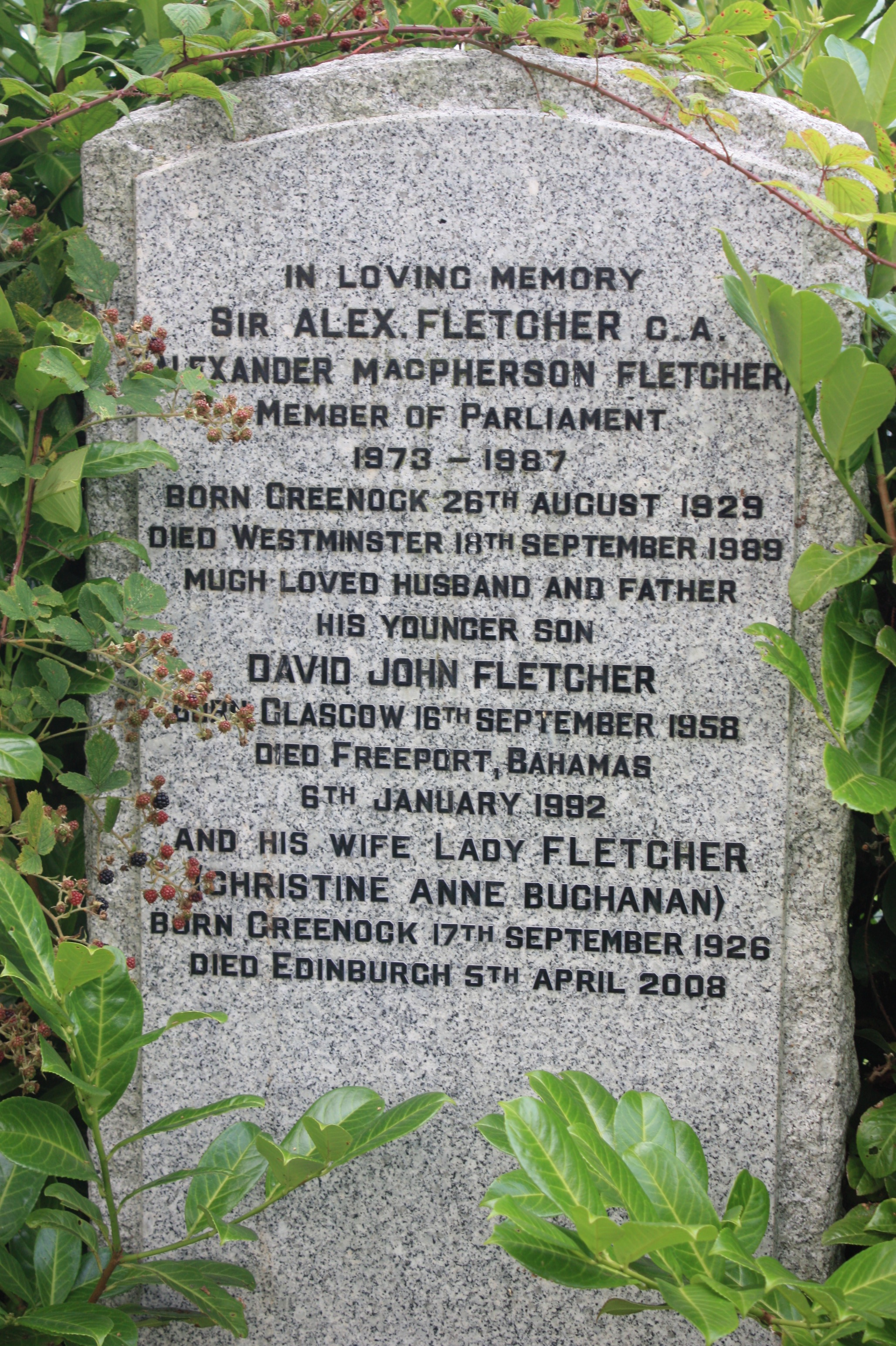
The grave of Sir Alexander MacPherson Fletcher in Dean Cemetery

Sir Alexander MacPherson Fletcher (26 August 1929 – 18 September 1989), sometimes known as Alex Fletcher, was a Scottish Conservative Party politician.

== Life ==
He was born in Greenock in western Scotland. He was married to Christine Anne Buchanan (1926–2008). They had a son, David John (1958–1992), who died aged 33 in Freeport, Bahamas. He was a company director and a chartered accountant and served as a member of East Kilbride Development Corporation from 1971 to 1973. He was also an Elder of the Church of Scotland.

== Political career ==
Fletcher first stood for Parliament in the 1970 General Election at West Renfrewshire. He was elected as the Member of Parliament (MP) for Edinburgh North at a by-election in 1973. An editorial in The Glasgow Herald the following day noted that Fletcher's win came despite this being a time of "unpopularity of the Government over prices", and Fletcher's result was contrasted favourably with the surprise defeat of the Labour candidate in the same day's by-election in Glasgow Govan. After his win was announced, Fletcher said that he considered the result to be "a tremendous vote of confidence in the Government from the people of Edinburgh." Ahead of the February 1974 general election, Edinburgh North underwent major boundary changes, but Fletcher retained the seat with a majority of over 7,000.

Ultimately, he remained MP for Edinburgh North until 1983, when after boundary changes he became MP for Edinburgh Central. However, at the 1987 general election he lost his seat to future Labour Chancellor of the Exchequer Alistair Darling. Several other prominent Scottish Conservative MPs, including Peter Fraser and Michael Ancram lost their seats in the same contest as the Conservative vote fell significantly in Scotland against the UK-wide trend. After his defeat, Fletcher commented, "There is no Tory press in Scotland. The papers up here are rather hostile to the Tory Party."

Fletcher was Under-Secretary of State for Scotland from 1979 to 1983, where had responsibility for Scottish education and industry as well as sport and the arts. He was Minister for Corporate and Consumer Affairs at the Department of Trade and Industry from 1983 to 1985, after which he returned to the back benches.

On Fletcher's death, the journalist Harry Reid, who had been a constituent of Fletcher in Edinburgh, described him as "a Scottish Tory of the decent school; he was warm affable and gregarious" and also stated his opinion that Fletcher was "a Scot first, and a Tory second."

== Views on Scottish Devolution ==
At Conservative meeting in Fife in 1977 Fletcher described himself as a supporter of Scottish devolution, but warned that some advocates of a Scottish Assembly were making "exaggerated claims" about the benefits it might bring. Following the result of the 1979 Scottish devolution referendum, Fletcher stated that he did not see how parliament could now proceed with the Scotland Act 1978, which would have set up an Assembly, citing the fact that so many regions of Scotland had voted against the assembly.

== Death ==
He died in Westminster but was returned to Edinburgh for burial. He and his wife are buried together in the 20th century (north) extension to Dean Cemetery in Edinburgh.

Parliament of the United Kingdom
Preceded by The Earl of Dalkeith	Member of Parliament for Edinburgh North; 1973 – 1983	constituency abolished
Preceded by Robin Cook	Member of Parliament for Edinburgh Central; 1983 – 1987	Succeeded by Alistair Darling
