= John Wilson (Govan MP) =

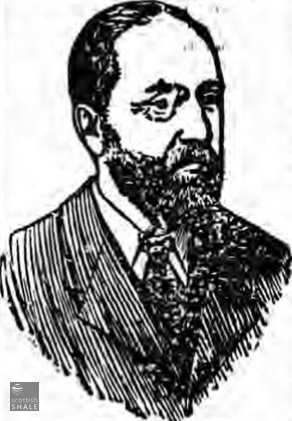
Sketch of John Wilson from The Dundee Evening Telegraph

John Wilson (1828 – 29 December 1905) was a British businessman Liberal Party politician in Scotland. He was elected as member of parliament (MP) for Glasgow Govan at a by-election in 1889, and held the seat until the 1900 general election.

He was the head of the firm of John Wilson and Son, merchants. A leader of the Scottish temperance movement, he was the chairman of the Scottish Temperance Life Assurance Company and was a parliamentary leader of the movement.

Parliament of the United Kingdom
Preceded by Sir William Pearce	Member of Parliament for Glasgow Govan; 1889–1900	Succeeded by Robert Hunter Craig
