= William Hunter, Lord Hunter =

Scottish advocate, judge and Liberal Party politician

William Hunter, Lord Hunter, DL (9 October 1865 – 10 April 1957) was a Scottish advocate, judge and Liberal Party politician.

== Early life ==
Hunter was born on 9 October 1865, the son of David Hunter, a ship-owner from Ayr. He was educated at Ayr Academy and at the University of Edinburgh where he graduated with an MA in 1886 and an LLB in 1889.

== Career ==
Hunter was admitted as an advocate in 1889. He was appointed a King's Counsel in 1905. He was the Member of Parliament (MP) for Govan Division of Lanarkshire from 1910 to 1911 and was Solicitor General for Scotland also from April 1910 to 1911. He was appointed a Senator of the College of Justice in December 1911, replacing the deceased Lord Ardwall. He took the judicial title Lord Hunter, and sat on the bench until 1936.

In 1919 and early 1920 Hunter chaired the Committee of Inquiry into the Amritsar massacre which condemned the conduct of General Reginald Dyer.

Parliament of the United Kingdom
Preceded by Robert Duncan	Member of Parliament for Glasgow Govan; January 1910–1911	Succeeded by Daniel Turner Holmes
Legal offices
Preceded by Arthur Dewar	Solicitor General for Scotland; 1910–1911	Succeeded by Andrew Anderson
