= Neil Maclean =

British politician (1875–1953)

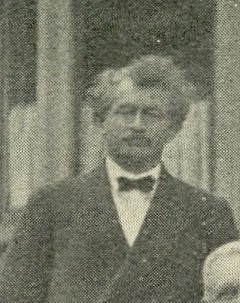
Maclean in 1922

Neil Maclean CBE (1875 – 12 September 1953) was a Scottish socialist and an Independent Labour Party and later Labour Party Member of Parliament for Govan.

Maclean was the first Secretary of the Socialist Labour Party, but was expelled in 1908. Then a member of the Independent Labour Party (ILP), Maclean worked closely with other socialists in the Glasgow area, as part of the Red Clydeside movement. Like many other Red Clydesiders, he was a conscientious objector during the First World War. He greatly influenced Manny Shinwell. An organiser for the Scottish Co-operative Wholesale Society, at the 1918 general election, Maclean was elected to the House of Commons to represent Govan in Glasgow. When many of his fellow ILP Clydesiders left the Labour Party, Maclean remained a Labour MP, associating for a time with the Scottish Socialist Party.

Maclean retired from Parliament in 1950, not having secured renomination. He was offered a seat in the House of Lords, but declined due to his socialist principles. He was appointed a CBE.

Political offices
Preceded by New position	Secretary of the Socialist Labour Party; 1903–1908	Succeeded by Frank Budgen
Parliament of the United Kingdom
Preceded by Daniel Turner Holmes	MP for Glasgow Govan; 1918–1950	Succeeded by Jack Browne
