= 1973 Edinburgh North by-election =

UK parliamentary by-election

A 1973 by-election for the House of Commons of the UK Parliament took place in Edinburgh North on 8 November 1973. Alexander Fletcher retained the seat for the Conservatives, after his predecessor became Duke of Buccleuch.

One of four UK parliamentary by-elections taking place that day, and one of two in Scotland; it was overshadowed in the media by the surprise Scottish National Party victory in Glasgow Govan.

Prior to the by-election, an opinion poll for The Glasgow Herald had predicted that the Conservatives would hold the seat with Labour in second place.

This was the Conservatives' last victory at a Scottish by-election until the 2026 Aberdeen South by-election.

1973 Edinburgh North by-election
Party	Candidate	Votes	%	±%
Conservative	Alexander Fletcher	7,208	38.69	−14.16
Labour	Robert Cairns	4,467	23.98	−13.11
SNP	William Wolfe	3,526	19.11	New
Liberal	Ronald Guild	3,431	18.42	+8.36
Majority		2,741	14.71	−1.05
Turnout		18,632		
Conservative hold		Swing		

== Reaction ==
In the aftermath of his victory, the winning Conservative candidate, Alex Fletcher, said that he considered the result to be "a tremendous vote of confidence in the Government from the people of Edinburgh." Labour's candidate, Robert Cairns, said his campaign had "under-estimated the solidarity of the Tory vote" and that some Labour voters had switched to the SNP. William Wolfe said he was "very pleased" that the SNP had established a stronghold in a constituency it had not previously contested. For the Liberal, Ronald Guild described the result as "a sad day for Scotland" and stated his belief that it meant that the Kilbrandon Report was "as good as buried".

An editorial in the following day's The Glasgow Herald said that the by-election results in Govan and Edinburgh "were the worst ever for the Labour Party in Scotland." It argued that in addition to the loss of what was considered a safe seat in Govan, "the failure of Labour to improve on their position in North Edinburgh" was significant given the perceived "unpopularity of the Government over prices." It noted that while Labour had lost out to the SNP the Conservatives in Edinburgh had kept the SNP and the Liberals "in also-ran spots."

== See also ==
- Edinburgh North (UK Parliament constituency)
- List of United Kingdom by-elections (1950–1979)
- 1973 Berwick-upon-Tweed by-election
- 1973 Glasgow Govan by-election
- 1973 Hove by-election
