= Bruce Millan =

British politician (1927–2013)

The Right Honourable Bruce Millan HonFRSE
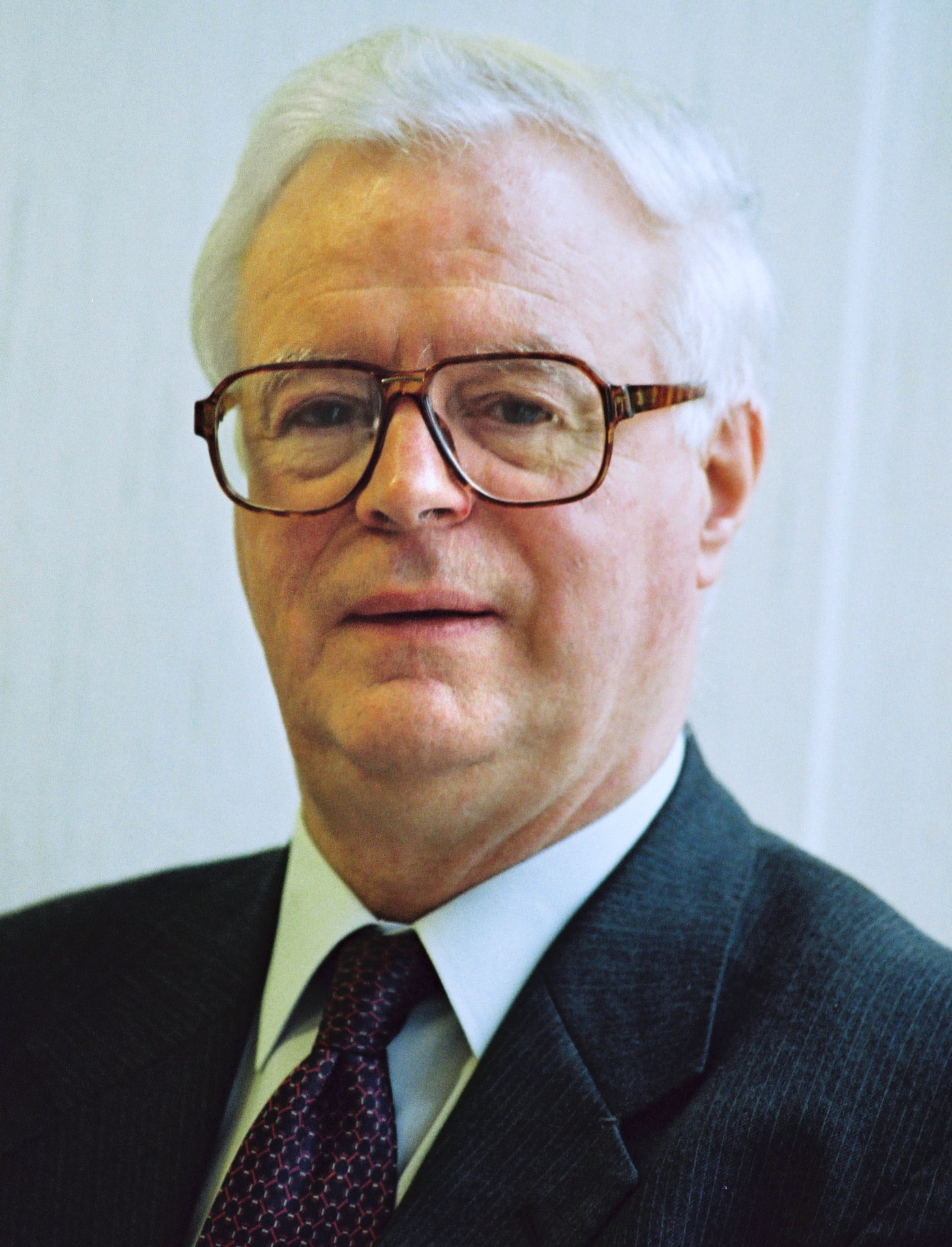
- Official portrait, 1992

European Commissioner for Regional Policy
- In office 6 January 1989 – 23 January 1995
- President: Jacques Delors
- Preceded by: Grigoris Varfis
- Succeeded by: Monika Wulf-Mathies

Shadow Secretary of State for Scotland
- In office 4 May 1979 – 31 October 1983
- Leader: James Callaghan; Michael Foot
- Preceded by: Teddy Taylor
- Succeeded by: Donald Dewar

Secretary of State for Scotland
- In office 8 April 1976 – 4 May 1979
- Prime Minister: James Callaghan
- Preceded by: Willie Ross
- Succeeded by: George Younger

Member of Parliament for Glasgow Govan
- In office 9 June 1983 – 18 October 1988
- Preceded by: Andrew McMahon
- Succeeded by: Jim Sillars

Member of Parliament for Glasgow Craigton
- In office 8 October 1959 – 9 June 1983
- Preceded by: Jack Browne
- Succeeded by: Constituency abolished

Personal details
- Born: 5 October 1927 Dundee, Scotland
- Died: 21 February 2013 (aged 85) Glasgow, Scotland
- Party: Labour
- Spouse: Gwendoline Fairey (m. 1953)
- Children: 2
- Education: Harris Academy
- Profession: Chartered accountant

Bruce Millan (5 October 1927 – 21 February 2013) was a British Labour politician who served as a European Commissioner from 1989 to 1995.

== Early life ==
Bruce Millan was born in Dundee, the son of a shipyard caulker and a jute weaver, and educated at Harris Academy in the city. He was active in the Labour League of Youth while at school, and after it he undertook his national service with the Royal Corps of Signals while studying at the same time for accountancy examinations. He became a chartered accountant in 1950.

Millan married Gwendoline May Fairey on 22 August 1953. The couple had a son and a daughter.

== Parliamentary career ==
Millan unsuccessfully contested West Renfrewshire in the 1951 general election and Glasgow Craigton in that of 1955.

He was elected as Member of Parliament (MP) for Glasgow Craigton at the 1959 general election and served for that seat, and after its abolition in 1983 for Glasgow Govan, until 1988. He served in the Wilson government of 1964–1970 as Under-Secretary of State for the Air Force from 1964 to 1966, as Under-Secretary of State for Scotland from 1966 to 1970, and in the Callaghan government of 1976–1979 as Secretary of State for Scotland; he subsequently served as Shadow Secretary of State for Scotland under new leader Michael Foot. At the time of the 1981 Labour Party Shadow Cabinet election, the first time Millan won election to the Shadow Cabinet, he was described by The Glasgow Herald as being identified with the "Centre-to-right" of the Labour Party.

== After Parliament ==
Millan left Parliament in 1988, by applying for the Chiltern Hundreds, in order to take up the post of European Commissioner for Regional Policy and Cohesion, which he held until 1995. The vacancy he left was filled by Jim Sillars of the SNP in the noteworthy Glasgow Govan by-election of 1988.

In 1991, Millan received an honorary doctorate from Heriot-Watt University.

Between 1999 and 2001 he chaired the Millan Committee, which proposed reforms to the provision of mental health care in Scotland.

Parliament of the United Kingdom
Preceded by Jack Browne	Member of Parliament for Glasgow Craigton; 1959–1983	Constituency abolished
Preceded by Andrew McMahon	Member of Parliament for Glasgow Govan; 1983–1988	Succeeded by Jim Sillars
Political offices
Preceded by William Ross	Secretary of State for Scotland; 1976–1979	Succeeded by George Younger
Preceded by Stanley Clinton-Davis	British European Commissioner; 1989–1994; Served alongside: Leon Brittan	Succeeded by Neil Kinnock
Preceded by The Lord Cockfield	British European Commissioner; 1989–1994; Served alongside: Leon Brittan	Succeeded by Leon Brittan
Preceded by Grigoris Varfis	European Commissioner for Regional Policy; 1989–1994	Succeeded by Monika Wulf-Mathies
