= Glasgow Craigton =

Former parliamentary constituency in the United Kingdom

- Former burgh constituency for the House of Commons
- Subdivisions of Scotland: County of city of Glasgow; City of Glasgow district

1955–1983
- Seats: One
- Created from: Glasgow Govan and Glasgow Pollok
- Replaced by: Glasgow Govan and Glasgow Pollok

Glasgow Craigton was a burgh constituency represented in the House of Commons of the Parliament of the United Kingdom from 1955 until 1983.

It elected one Member of Parliament (MP) using the first-past-the-post voting system.

== Boundaries ==
1955–1974: The County of the City of Glasgow ward of Craigton, and parts of Fairfield and Pollokshields wards.

1974–1983: The County of the City of Glasgow ward of Craigton, and part of Pollokshields ward.

== Members of Parliament ==
Election	Member	Party
1955	Jack Browne	Conservative
1959	Bruce Millan	Labour
1983	constituency abolished	

== Elections ==
=== Elections in the 1950s ===
General election 1955: Glasgow Craigton
Party	Candidate	Votes	%	±%
Unionist	Jack Browne	19,120	50.28	
Labour	Bruce Millan	18,910	49.72	
Majority		210	0.54	
Turnout		38,030	79.12	
Registered electors		48,065		
Unionist win (new seat)				

General election 1959: Glasgow Craigton
Party	Candidate	Votes	%	±%
Labour	Bruce Millan	19,649	50.78	+1.06
Unionist	Jack Browne	19,047	49.22	−1.06
Majority		602	1.56	N/A
Turnout		38,696	82.74	+3.62
Registered electors		46,768		
Labour gain from Unionist		Swing	+1.06	

=== Elections in the 1960s ===
General election 1964: Glasgow Craigton
Party	Candidate	Votes	%	±%
Labour	Bruce Millan	21,775	58.39	+7.61
Unionist	Peter C Hutchison	15,518	41.61	−7.61
Majority		6,257	16.78	+15.22
Turnout		37,293	80.86	−1.88
Registered electors		46,118		
Labour hold		Swing	+7.61	

General election 1966: Glasgow Craigton
Party	Candidate	Votes	%	±%
Labour	Bruce Millan	21,174	57.90	−0.49
Conservative	Peter C Hutchison	11,970	32.73	−8.88
SNP	George Leslie	3,425	9.37	New
Majority		9,204	25.17	+8.39
Turnout		36,569	80.42	−0.44
Registered electors		45,472		
Labour hold		Swing	+4.20	

=== Elections in the 1970s ===
General election 1970: Glasgow Craigton
Party	Candidate	Votes	%	±%
Labour	Bruce Millan	20,872	55.69	−2.21
Conservative	Walter Wober	13,661	36.45	+3.72
SNP	Ronald Edwards	2,946	7.86	−1.51
Majority		7,211	19.24	−8.93
Turnout		37,479	74.88	−5.54
Registered electors		50,050		
Labour hold		Swing	−2.97	

General election February 1974: Glasgow Craigton
Party	Candidate	Votes	%	±%
Labour	Bruce Millan	18,055	51.33	
Conservative	Alastair MacNeill Scouller	10,817	30.75	
SNP	Robert Graham Houston	6,303	17.92	
Majority		7,238	20.58	
Turnout		35,175	80.03	
Registered electors		43,949		
Labour hold		Swing		

- This constituency underwent boundary changes between the 1970 and February 1974 general elections and thus calculation of change in vote share is not meaningful.

General election October 1974: Glasgow Craigton
Party	Candidate	Votes	%	±%
Labour	Bruce Millan	16,952	50.47	−0.85
SNP	Robert Graham Houston	8,171	24.33	+6.41
Conservative	Gerald Fox Belton	6,734	20.05	−10.70
Liberal	Robert McIntyre	1,728	5.15	New
Majority		8,781	26.14	+5.56
Turnout		33,585	75.76	−4.24
Registered electors		44,333		
Labour hold		Swing	−3.63	

General election 1979: Glasgow Craigton
Party	Candidate	Votes	%	±%
Labour	Bruce Millan	19,952	59.89	+9.42
Conservative	John Mair	9,480	28.46	+8.41
SNP	Robert Simpson Silver	3,881	11.65	−12.68
Majority		10,472	31.43	+5.31
Turnout		33,313	75.15	−0.61
Registered electors		44,326		
Labour hold		Swing	+0.51	
