= Jim Sillars =

Scottish politician (born 1937)

Depute Leader of the Scottish National Party
- In office 22 September 1991 – 25 September 1992
- Leader: Alex Salmond
- Preceded by: Alasdair Morgan
- Succeeded by: Allan Macartney

Member of Parliament for Glasgow Govan
- In office 10 November 1988 – 16 March 1992
- Preceded by: Bruce Millan
- Succeeded by: Ian Davidson

Member of Parliament for South Ayrshire
- In office 19 March 1970 – 7 April 1979
- Preceded by: Emrys Hughes
- Succeeded by: George Foulkes

Personal details
- Born: 4 October 1937 (age 89) Ayr, Ayrshire, Scotland
- Party: SNP (from 1980)
- Other political affiliations: Labour (1960–76); SLP (1976–80)
- Spouse: Margo MacDonald (m. 1981; died 2014)
- Occupation: Firefighter

James Sillars (born 4 October 1937) is a Scottish politician and campaigner for Scottish independence. Sillars served as a Labour Party MP for South Ayrshire from 1970 to 1976. He founded and led the pro-Scottish Home Rule Scottish Labour Party in 1976, continuing as MP for South Ayrshire until he lost the seat in 1979.

Sillars joined the Scottish National Party in 1980 and later served as MP for Glasgow Govan after winning a by-election in 1988, and was Depute Leader of the Scottish National Party. He was married to Margo MacDonald until her death in 2014.

== Early life and career ==
Sillars was born in Ayr, the son of Matthew, a railwayman, and Agnes Sillars (née Sproat), a carpet weaver. He was educated at Newton Park School and Ayr Academy. After leaving school he worked as an apprentice plasterer, before following his father into working on the railways. Sillars served as a radio operator in the Royal Navy from 1956 to 1960, before becoming a firefighter. It was as a fireman that he became more active politically, through the Fire Brigades Union (FBU), and he joined the Labour Party in 1960. He served as a member of Ayr Town Council from 1962 to 1970, and was Head of Organisation and Social Services at the Scottish Trades Union Congress (STUC) from 1968 to 1970.

== Political career ==
=== Labour Party and SLP breakaway ===
Sillars was elected at a by-election in 1970 as the Labour Party Member of Parliament (MP) for South Ayrshire, quickly establishing a reputation as an articulate, intellectual left-winger. When he first arrived in Parliament he was known for his vocal hostility to Scottish nationalism; having already co-authored a pamphlet (Don't Butcher Scotland's Future) that argued passionately against Scottish Home Rule, his denunciations of separatism and the Scottish National Party (SNP) soon led to him receiving the sobriquet (shared with William Ross) 'Hammer of the Nats'. However, following the strong showing by the SNP at the 1971 Stirling and Falkirk by-election, Sillars began to rethink his ideals: together with the by-election victor Harry Ewing and Alex Eadie (co-author of Don't Butcher Scotland's Future), he eventually came out in favour of the establishment of a devolved Scottish Assembly.

In 1976 Sillars led a breakaway Scottish Labour Party (SLP). The formation of the SLP was inspired primarily by the failure of the then Labour Government to secure a Scottish Assembly with strong executive powers. Sillars threw himself into establishing the SLP as a political force, but ultimately it collapsed following the 1979 general election. At that election the SLP had nominated a mere three candidates (including Sillars who was attempting to hold on to his South Ayrshire seat). Only Sillars came remotely close to winning and it was this failure to secure a meaningful share of the vote that prompted the decision to disband nearly two years later.

=== Scottish National Party ===
In the early 1980s, Sillars (along with many other former SLP members) joined the Scottish National Party (SNP). Being a left-winger he had fostered close links with the SNP internal 79 Group; who had encouraged him to join. Along with the 79 Group and the former SLP members in the SNP, Sillars started to shape the SNP as a clearly defined, left-of-centre party. Policies adopted included the support of a non-payment scheme in relation to the poll tax introduced by the Conservative government of Margaret Thatcher, as well as the policy of independence within the European Union, of which Sillars was a leading exponent. Sillars also started talking in terms of direct action to bring prominence to the Scottish independence cause, stating that: "we must be prepared to hear the sound of cell doors crashing behind us if we are prepared to win independence".

Having failed to win the Linlithgow seat from Tam Dalyell of the Labour Party at the 1987 general election, Sillars was chosen to be the SNP candidate for the Glasgow Govan by-election, held on 10 November 1988. Govan was a Labour seat (although Sillars's wife Margo MacDonald had won it for the SNP in a by-election fifteen years previously, in 1973), but Sillars won a dramatic victory over Labour's Bob Gillespie. A Labour press officer drafted from London for the campaign later recalled the Proclaimers "driving round Govan on the back of a flatbed truck urging everyone to kick Labour where it hurt".

At the 1991 party conference, Sillars was elected the SNP's Depute Leader, beating Alasdair Morgan by 279 votes to 184. Many had been surprised that he did not stand for the party leadership when it became available in 1990. The 1992 general election proved a disappointment for Sillars personally; as he lost his Glasgow Govan seat to Ian Davidson of the Labour Party. It was at this time that Sillars made his famous comment that "Scotland has too many ninety-minute patriots whose nationalist outpourings are expressed only at major sporting events". This comment proved the beginning of a break with the SNP leadership; the leader at the time, Alex Salmond, had been a Sillars ally, but his comments in the aftermath of the 1992 general election (and it is also suspected the fact that Sillars supported Salmond's opponent in the leadership contest, Margaret Ewing) started this break.

=== Scottish Parliament ===
Unlike his wife, Sillars called for abstention on the 1997 Scottish devolution referendum, He accused Salmond of having no strategy for full independence and claimed the referendum was a fraud as "the SNP says it is a stepping stone to independence and Scottish Secretary Donald Dewar insists it will strengthen the Union", adding "Abstention is the best form of contempt". SNP chief executive Mike Russell, however, shut down Sillars claims: "Jim's view is clearly not shared by the membership. Our National Council voted overwhelmingly by over 300 to 6 for the clear and constructive Yes, Yes strategy. The alternative that Jim seems to support is the politics of despair."

In June 2004, Sillars called for the resignation of John Swinney as SNP leader and also claimed that the party's acceptance of devolution had been a tactical blunder. He told BBC Radio Scotland's Sunday Live programme: "Devolution has parochialised Scottish politics and marginalised Scotland at Westminster. I would challenge any of your listeners. Turn to your partner, wife, friend and say 'name me 12 Westminster members of parliament' and they'll be hard pushed to do that. Not because they're dummies, but the Scottish media hardly gives them any coverage from a Westminster point of view, so the people in the big league, they don't really count." In a 2019 interview with Tribune magazine, Sillars said that he felt vindicated over his decision to oppose devolution. "The creation of Holyrood has narrowed the political intellectual spectrum in Scotland, and provincialised the nation," he claimed. "They seem to be happy arguing about gender equality, smacking children, and who spends enough money in the health service. Where is the imagination?"

On 3 March 2022, the Daily Record revealed that Sillars had donated £2,000 to Labour MSP Jackie Baillie during the 2021 Scottish Parliament election campaign. According to the Electoral Commission, Sillars made two separate donations of £1,000 in the weeks before polling day. Baillie retained her seat in Dumbarton, thus depriving the SNP of a majority at Holyrood. Explaining his decision, Sillars said he believed Baillie was "a very impressive member of Parliament" and that he had been impressed with her performance on the Holyrood committee scrutinising the Government's unlawful probe into sexual misconduct allegations into Alex Salmond. "She was a stand out on that committee," he said. "I would prefer her in the parliament to a clone on the backbenches. I don't think there is any doubt she is an asset to the parliament. My concern, in donating to Jackie Baillie, was to have a very able person in parliament. I didn't want someone with considerable ability to disappear." When asked if his donation could have helped Baillie win and ultimately deprived the SNP of an outright majority, Sillars responded: "If that was a consequence of it, so be it." Responding to the revelations, Toni Giugliano, the SNP candidate whom Baillie defeated at the election, said: "Mr Sillars has more in common with Jackie Baillie than he does with the SNP these days - so I'm not surprised. It's only a matter of time before he's asked to be the frontman for the next Better Together campaign."

=== Scottish independence referendum ===
In 2014 his book In Place of Fear II: A Socialist Programme for an Independent Scotland was published, in which he outlined his vision of a socialist and independent Scotland. The book was named after Aneurin Bevan's 1952 work, In Place of Fear. During the 2014 Scottish independence referendum, Sillars said: "BP, in an independent Scotland, will need to learn the meaning of nationalisation, in part or in whole, as it has in other countries who have not been as soft as we have forced to be. We will be the masters of the oil fields, not BP or any other of the majors."

In March 2022, Sillars claimed that it was "foolish" to talk about another independence referendum whilst the Russo-Ukrainian War was going on. In an open letter, he wrote: "The prime objective of the independence movement is not to hold a referendum now, but to create an overwhelming majority for independence. Only when that is achieved do we want a referendum, because that will be one we can win. That is not the case today." An SNP spokesperson responded: "Jim Sillars recently called for independence to be 'deprioritised' – and donated cash to keep Scotland under Westminster control. Any claims he has to support independence are contradicted by his own words and deeds."

Sillars told an Alba Party meeting in July 2023 that Scottish independence supporters were "in no position to win" in proposed second referendum. He also backed the creation of a single pro-independence organisation, which was unaffiliated to any party, to campaign for Scottish independence.

=== European Union ===
In January 2016, contrary to the SNP position, he announced he would campaign in favour of British withdrawal from the European Union during the 2016 United Kingdom European Union membership referendum. He said: "I think [the EU] is a profoundly undemocratic organisation which has shown a callous disregard for people, in Portugal, Spain and Greece for example. They've been willing to make people destitute - beggar nations - in pursuit of a single policy to create a United States of Europe irrespective of whether the people want it."

The week before the EU referendum was held, Sillars criticised claims by First Minister and SNP leader, Nicola Sturgeon that leaving the EU would put Scots "at the mercy of the most right-wing Tory government in modern history." He told the BBC that he was "extremely disappointed" in Sturgeon for "adopting the same tactic as Cameron and company, which is to try to drive people into the Remain side through unjustified fear". Sillars also dismissed SNP MP Joanna Cherry's suggestion that the UK would no longer have access to trading with the EU's free market. "There's actually no reason to believe that if the United Kingdom comes out of the European Union, there will be any problem in us trading with the EU as we're doing at the moment," he told CNBC, citing the billions of pounds worth of goods that other EU member states sold to the UK every year.

=== Alba Party ===
On 26 March 2021, Sillars backed Alex Salmond's new Alba Party, saying: "This is a very welcome development as it gives the independence voters a party that is not the SNP – which many, including me, with justification, believe is tainted with political corruption, and which is grossly incompetent in a whole range of its activities from building ferries to building hospitals, and boasting about being the Saudi Arabia of wind, without creating jobs." He still remains a member of the SNP, but told Holyrood magazine's Politically Speaking podcast that he had not voted for them "for a long time". He said: "I didn't join Alba, and I won't join Alba. Alba and the SNP means the movement is split, and a split movement will not win. I'm hoping a change of leadership in the SNP is going to happen and I'm staying in the SNP, hoping to influence people, saying 'look, we've got to have a rapprochement with the people who left to join Alba.'"

Following the defeat of the SNP in the 2024 United Kingdom general election, Sillars described John Swinney's leadership as "a busted flush" and Nicola Sturgeon as "Stalin's wee sister".

== Published work ==
- (with Alex Eadie) Don't Butcher Scotland's Future: The Case Against the S.N.P. Together With an Argument for Reform at All Levels of Government, Ayr Labour Party, Ayr, 1968
- 'Why I'm not in the SNP', in Easton, Norman (ed.), Crann-Tàra No. 1, Winter 1977, p. 4, ISSN 0142-7814
- Review of The Politics of Nationalism and Devolution by H. M. Drucker & Gordon Brown, in Murray, Glen (ed.), Cencrastus No. 6, Autumn 1981, p. 34
- No Turning Back: The Case for Scottish Independence within the European Community and How we face the Challenge of 1992, Scottish National Party, August 1988
- 'Freedom and Order', in Ross, Raymond J. (ed.), Cencrastus No. 34, Summer '89, pp. 14 – 16, ISSN 0264-0856
- In Place of Fear II, Vagabond Voices, Glasgow, 2014, ISBN 978-1-908251-30-5

Parliament of the United Kingdom
Preceded by Emrys Hughes	Member of Parliament for South Ayrshire; 1970–1979	Succeeded by George Foulkes
Preceded by Bruce Millan	Member of Parliament for Glasgow Govan; 1988–1992	Succeeded by Ian Davidson
Party political offices
Preceded by Jim Fairlie	Scottish National Party Vice Chairman (Policy); 1981–1983	Succeeded by George Leslie
Preceded by Alasdair Morgan	Senior Vice Convener (Depute Leader) of the Scottish National Party; 1991–92	Succeeded by Allan Macartney
