= 1889 Govan by-election =

UK parliamentary by-election

The 1889 Govan by-election was a parliamentary by-election held on 18 January 1889 for the British House of Commons, in the Govan constituency, located in Lanarkshire, Scotland.

The seat became vacant following the death of the Conservative Party Member of Parliament (MP) Sir William Pearce, who died at the age of 55 on 18 December 1888. A major shipbuilder and owner of the Fairfield Shipbuilding and Engineering Company, Pearce had held the seat since its creation for the 1885 general election.

== Candidates ==
The Conservatives did not field a candidate, and the seat was contested only by the Liberal Party candidate, John Wilson, and John Pender of the Liberal Unionists. Pender had previously served as a Liberal MP for Totnes in Devon and later for Wick Burghs.

== Result ==
The result was a victory for Wilson, who held the seat until he stepped down at the 1900 general election. Pender returned to Parliament three years later, when he regained his Wick Burghs seat at the 1892 general election.

Govan by-election, 18 January 1889
Party	Candidate	Votes	%	±%
Liberal	John Wilson	4,420	56.9	+9.6
Liberal Unionist	Sir John Pender	3,349	43.1	−9.6
Majority		1,071	13.8	N/A
Turnout		7,769	84.1	+8.7
Liberal gain from Conservative		Swing	+9.6	

== See also ==
- Govan constituency
- 1973 Glasgow Govan by-election
- 1988 Glasgow Govan by-election
- Lists of United Kingdom by-elections
