= John Rankin (British politician) =

Scottish Labour Co-operative politician

John Rankin (1 February 1889 – 8 October 1973) was a Scottish Labour Co-operative politician.

Rankin was educated at Allan Glen's School (Glasgow), and the University of Glasgow. He became a school teacher, propagandist and lecturer. He took a significant part in the debates on the Education (Scotland) Bill in 1969 that, once passed and enacted, led to the change in status of Allan Glen's School and other state selective schools in Scotland to comprehensives.

== Career ==
Rankin first stood for Parliament without success in Glasgow Pollok in 1923, 1924 and 1935. He served as Labour Co-operative Member of Parliament (MP) for the constituency of Glasgow Tradeston from 1945 to 1955 and for Glasgow Govan from 1955 until his death in 1973 aged 84. His death led to the 1973 Glasgow Govan by-election, famously won by Margo MacDonald for the Scottish National Party.

== Sources ==
- Leigh Rayment's Historical List of MPs

Parliament of the United Kingdom
Preceded by Thomas Henderson	Member of Parliament for Glasgow Tradeston; 1945 – 1955	Constituency abolished
Preceded by Jack Browne	Member of Parliament for Glasgow Govan; 1955 – 1973	Succeeded by Margo MacDonald
Honorary titles
Preceded by S. O. Davies	Oldest sitting member (nb not Father of the House); 1972–1973	Succeeded by Irene Ward
