= Glasgow Govan (UK Parliament constituency) =

Parliamentary constituency from 1885 to 2005

- Former burgh constituency for the House of Commons
- Subdivisions of Scotland: Glasgow City
- Major settlements: Govan

1885–2005
- Seats: One
- Created from: North Lanarkshire
- Replaced by: Glasgow Central; Glasgow South; Glasgow South West

Glasgow Govan was a parliamentary constituency in the Govan district of Glasgow. It was represented in the House of Commons of the Parliament of the United Kingdom for 120 years; from 1885 until 2005, returning one Member of Parliament (MP) elected by the first-past-the-post system.

It was a Conservative-Liberal marginal seat for the first three decades of its existence, before breaking this trend when the Labour Party won the seat in 1918. It remained a Labour-controlled seat for the next fifty-five years, except for a five-year Conservative interlude between 1950 and 1955, until being seized by the Scottish National Party at a by-election in 1973, only to be regained by Labour the following year. The SNP regained the seat at a 1988 by-election, only to lose it again to Labour in 1992. It remained under Labour control until its abolition thirteen years later.

The area which the constituency represented is now covered by Glasgow Central, Glasgow South and Glasgow South West.

== Boundaries ==
1885–1918: "That part of the parish of Govan which lies south of the Clyde beyond the boundary of the Municipal Burgh of Glasgow".

1918–1950: "That portion of the city which is bounded by a line commencing at a point on the municipal boundary at the centre of the River Clyde in line with the continuation of the centre line of Balmoral Street, thence eastward along the centre line of the River Clyde to a point in line with the continuation of the centre line of the portion of Govan Road to the west of Princes Dock, thence southward to and along the centre line of the said portion of Govan Road, Whitefield Road, Church Road and continuation thereof to the centre, of the Glasgow and Paisley Joint Railway, thence westward along the centre line of the said Glasgow and Paisley Joint Railway to the municipal boundary, thence north-westward, northward, and eastward along the municipal boundary to the point of commencement."

1950–1955: The Craigton and Fairfield wards of the county of the city of Glasgow, and part of the Govan ward.

1955–1974: The Govan and Kinning Park wards of the county of the city of Glasgow, and part of the Fairfield and Kingston wards.

1974–1983: The Glasgow wards of Fairfield, Govan, Kingston, and Kinning Park.

1983–1997: The City of Glasgow District electoral divisions of Drumoyne/Govan, Mosspark/Bellahouston, and Penilee/Cardonald.

1997–2005: The City of Glasgow District electoral divisions of Govan/Drumoyne, Kingston/Pollokshields, and Langside/Shawlands.

== Members of Parliament ==
Election	Member	Party
1885	Sir William Pearce	Conservative
1889 by-election	John Wilson	Liberal
1900	Robert Hunter Craig	Liberal
1906	Robert Duncan	Unionist
1910	William Hunter	Liberal
1911 by-election	Daniel Holmes	Liberal
1918	Neil Maclean	Labour and Independent Labour Party
1931	Neil Maclean	Labour
1950	Jack Browne	Unionist
1955	John Rankin	Labour Co-operative
1973 by-election	Margo MacDonald	SNP
Feb 1974	Harry Selby	Labour
1979	Andy McMahon	Labour
1983	Bruce Millan	Labour
1988 by-election	Jim Sillars	SNP
1992	Ian Davidson	Labour Co-operative
1997	Mohammad Sarwar	Labour
1997	Mohammad Sarwar	Independent
1999	Mohammad Sarwar	Labour
2005	constituency abolished	

== Elections ==
=== Elections in the 1880s ===
General election 1885: Glasgow Govan
Party	Candidate	Votes	%	±%
Conservative	William Pearce	3,677	51.0	
Lib-Lab	Bennet Burleigh	3,522	48.8	
Independent Liberal	David George Hoey	11	0.2	
Majority		155	2.2	
Turnout		7,210	80.1	
Registered electors		8,998		
Conservative win (new seat)				

General election 1886: Glasgow Govan
Party	Candidate	Votes	%	±%
Conservative	William Pearce	3,574	52.7	+1.7
Liberal	Thomas Alexander Dickson	3,212	47.3	−1.5
Majority		362	5.4	+3.2
Turnout		6,786	75.4	−4.7
Registered electors		8,998		
Conservative hold		Swing	+1.6	

Pearce's death caused a by-election.

By-election, 18 January 1889
Party	Candidate	Votes	%	±%
Liberal	John Wilson	4,420	56.9	+9.6
Liberal Unionist	John Pender	3,349	43.1	−9.6
Majority		1,071	13.8	
Turnout		7,769	84.1	+8.7
Registered electors		9,240		
Liberal gain from Conservative		Swing	+9.6	

=== Elections in the 1890s ===
General election 1892: Glasgow Govan
Party	Candidate	Votes	%	±%
Liberal	John Wilson	4,829	55.8	+8.5
Conservative	Nathaniel Spens	3,829	44.2	−8.5
Majority		1,000	11.6	
Turnout		8,658	77.6	+2.2
Registered electors		11,151		
Liberal gain from Conservative		Swing	+8.5	

General election 1895: Glasgow Govan
Party	Candidate	Votes	%	±%
Liberal	John Wilson	4,290	49.0	−6.8
Liberal Unionist	George Ferguson	4,029	46.1	+1.9
Ind. Labour Party	Alexander Haddow	430	4.9	New
Majority		261	2.9	−8.7
Turnout		8,749	76.6	−1.0
Registered electors		11,416		
Liberal hold		Swing	−4.4	

=== Elections in the 1900s ===
General election 1900: Glasgow Govan
Party	Candidate	Votes	%	±%
Liberal	Robert Hunter Craig	5,744	50.7	+1.7
Conservative	Robert Duncan	5,580	49.3	+3.2
Majority		164	1.4	−1.5
Turnout		11,324	76.5	−0.1
Registered electors		14,807		
Liberal hold		Swing	−0.8	

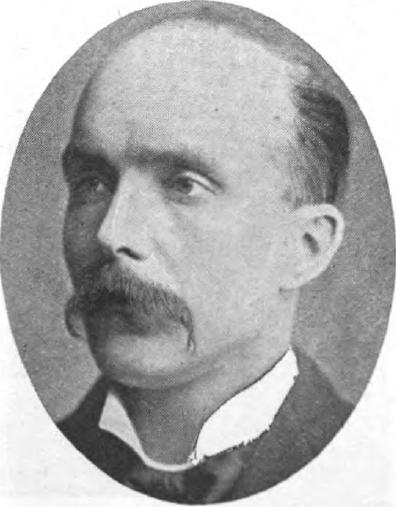
John Hill

General election 1906: Glasgow Govan
Party	Candidate	Votes	%	±%
Conservative	Robert Duncan	5,224	35.9	−13.4
Liberal	H. S. Murray	5,096	35.1	−15.6
Labour Repr. Cmte.	John Hill	4,212	29.0	New
Majority		128	0.8	
Turnout		14,532	82.9	+6.4
Registered electors		17,538		
Conservative gain from Liberal		Swing	+1.1	

=== Elections in the 1910s ===
General election January 1910: Glasgow Govan
Party	Candidate	Votes	%	±%
Liberal	William Hunter	6,556	43.0	+7.9
Conservative	Robert Duncan	5,127	33.7	−2.2
Labour	James Thomas Brownlie	3,545	23.3	−5.7
Majority		1,429	9.3	
Turnout		15,228	84.6	+1.7
Registered electors		17,994		
Liberal gain from Conservative		Swing	+5.1	

Hunter is appointed Solicitor General for Scotland, prompting a by-election.

By-election, 1910: Glasgow Govan
Party	Candidate	Votes	%	±%
Liberal	William Hunter	Unopposed		
Liberal hold				

General election December 1910: Glasgow Govan
Party	Candidate	Votes	%	±%
Liberal	William Hunter	8,409	56.9	+13.9
Conservative	George Balfour	6,369	43.1	+9.4
Majority		2,040	13.8	+4.5
Turnout		14,778	79.9	−4.7
Registered electors		18,504		
Liberal hold		Swing	+2.3	

1911 Govan by-election
Party	Candidate	Votes	%	±%
Liberal	Daniel Holmes	7,508	53.5	−3.4
Conservative	George Balfour	6,522	46.5	+3.4
Majority		986	7.0	−6.8
Turnout		14,030	76.3	−3.6
Registered electors		18,395		
Liberal hold		Swing	−3.4	

General election 1918: Glasgow Govan
Party		Candidate	Votes	%	±%
	Labour	Neil Maclean	9,577	47.8	New
C	Unionist	Alexander McClure	8,762	43.8	+0.7
	Liberal	Daniel Holmes	1,678	8.4	−48.5
Majority			815	4.0	
Turnout			20,017	63.2	−16.7
Registered electors			31,652		
	Labour gain from Liberal		Swing		
C indicates candidate endorsed by the coalition government.

=== Elections in the 1920s ===
Helen Fraser

General election 1922: Glasgow Govan
Party	Candidate	Votes	%	±%
Labour	Neil Maclean	15,441	62.3	+14.5
National Liberal	Helen Fraser	9,336	37.7	+29.3
Majority		6,105	24.6	+20.6
Turnout		24,777	81.1	+17.9
Registered electors		30,539		
Labour hold		Swing	−7.4	

General election 1923: Glasgow Govan
Party	Candidate	Votes	%	±%
Labour	Neil Maclean	13,987	66.3	+4.0
Liberal	Henry Anderson Watt	7,095	33.7	−4.0
Majority		6,892	32.6	+8.0
Turnout		21,082	68.5	−12.6
Registered electors		30,790		
Labour hold		Swing	+4.0	

General election 1924: Glasgow Govan
Party	Candidate	Votes	%	±%
Labour	Neil Maclean	15,132	63.2	−3.1
Unionist	H. Stanley	8,815	36.8	New
Majority		6,317	26.4	−6.2
Turnout		23,947	76.0	+7.5
Registered electors		31,497		
Labour hold		Swing	−3.1	

General election 1929: Glasgow Govan
Party	Candidate	Votes	%	±%
Ind. Labour Party	*Neil Maclean	17,384	57.7	−5.5
Unionist	Douglas Douglas-Hamilton	12,736	42.3	+5.5
Majority		4,646	15.4	−11.0
Turnout		30,122	75.1	−0.9
Registered electors		40,103		
Ind. Labour Party gain from Labour		Swing	−5.5	

- candidature not endorsed by Labour Party HQ

=== Elections in the 1930s ===
General election 1931: Glasgow Govan
Party	Candidate	Votes	%	±%
Labour	*Neil Maclean	15,047	51.0	−6.7
Unionist	Alexander McClure	14,442	49.0	+6.7
Majority		605	2.0	−13.4
Turnout		29,489	75.4	+0.3
Labour hold		Swing		

- Maclean had been expelled by the ILP but was endorsed by Labour Party HQ.

General election 1935: Glasgow Govan
Party	Candidate	Votes	%	±%
Labour	Neil Maclean	15,791	51.0	±0.0
Unionist	Alexander McClure	10,211	33.0	−16.0
Ind. Labour Party	Thomas Taylor	4,959	16.0	New
Majority		5,580	18.0	+16.0
Turnout		30,961	74.7	−0.7
Labour hold		Swing		

=== Election in the 1940s ===
General election 1945: Glasgow Govan
Party	Candidate	Votes	%	±%
Labour	Neil Maclean	18,668	66.1	+15.1
Unionist	Jack Browne	9,586	33.9	+0.9
Majority		9,082	32.2	+14.2
Turnout		28,254	64.08	−10.6
Labour hold		Swing		

=== Elections in the 1950s ===
General election 1950: Glasgow Govan
Party	Candidate	Votes	%	±%
Unionist	Jack Browne	19,267	46.6	+12.7
Labour	John Davis	18,894	45.7	−20.4
Liberal	Ronnie Fraser	1,628	3.9	New
Communist	William Lauchlan	1,547	3.8	New
Majority		373	0.9	
Turnout		41,336	84.0	+19.9
Unionist gain from Labour		Swing		

General election 1951: Glasgow Govan
Party	Candidate	Votes	%	±%
Unionist	Jack Browne	20,936	50.3	+3.7
Labour	John Davis	20,695	49.7	+4.0
Majority		241	0.58	−0.3
Turnout		41,631	84.92	+0.9
Unionist hold		Swing		

General election 1955: Glasgow Govan
Party	Candidate	Votes	%	±%
Labour Co-op	John Rankin	24,818	62.0	+12.3
Unionist	Alexander G Hutton	15,216	38.0	−12.3
Majority		9,602	23.98	
Turnout		40,034	71.82	−13.1
Labour Co-op gain from Unionist		Swing		

- the boundaries of the seat were heavily redrawn and much of the 1950-55 version of Govan ended up in the new Craigton seat

General election 1959: Glasgow Govan
Party	Candidate	Votes	%	±%
Labour Co-op	John Rankin	23,139	60.4	−1.6
Unionist	Alexander G Hutton	13,319	34.7	−3.3
Communist	Gordon McLennan	1,869	4.9	New
Majority		9,820	25.62	+1.6
Turnout		38,327	75.03	+3.2
Labour Co-op hold		Swing		

=== Elections in the 1960s ===
General election 1964: Glasgow Govan
Party	Candidate	Votes	%	±%
Labour Co-op	John Rankin	20,326	64.99	
Unionist	Peter Breuer	9,571	30.60	
Communist	Gordon McLennan	1,378	4.41	
Majority		10,755	34.39	
Turnout		31,275	70.25	
Labour Co-op hold		Swing		

General election 1966: Glasgow Govan
Party	Candidate	Votes	%	±%
Labour Co-op	John Rankin	18,533	67.8	+2.8
Conservative	Peter Breuer	7,677	28.1	−2.5
Communist	Gordon McLennan	1,103	4.0	−0.4
Majority		10,856	39.75	+5.3
Turnout		27,313	67.47	−2.7
Labour Co-op hold		Swing		

=== Elections in the 1970s ===
General election 1970: Glasgow Govan
Party	Candidate	Votes	%	±%
Labour Co-op	John Rankin	13,443	60.1	−7.7
Conservative	Gerald F. Belton	6,301	28.2	+0.1
SNP	Michael Grieve	2,294	10.3	New
Communist	Thomas Biggam	326	1.5	−2.5
Majority		7,142	31.9	−7.8
Turnout		22,364	63.2	−4.3
Labour Co-op hold		Swing		

1973 Glasgow Govan by-election
Party	Candidate	Votes	%	±%
SNP	Margo MacDonald	6,360	41.5	+31.2
Labour	Harry Selby	5,789	38.2	−21.9
Conservative	John Mair	1,780	11.7	−16.5
Liberal	Peter McMillan	1,239	8.2	New
Majority		571	3.3	
Turnout		15,168		
SNP gain from Labour Co-op		Swing	+26.7	

General election February 1974: Glasgow Govan
Party	Candidate	Votes	%	±%
Labour	Harry Selby	10,326	43.17	−17.0
SNP	Margo MacDonald	9,783	40.90	+30.6
Conservative	John Mair	3,049	12.75	−15.4
Liberal	Peter McMillan	763	3.19	New
Majority		543	2.27	−29.6
Turnout		23,920	74.92	+11.7
Labour hold		Swing	−18.8	

General election October 1974: Glasgow Govan
Party	Candidate	Votes	%	±%
Labour	Harry Selby	11,392	49.5	+6.3
SNP	Margo MacDonald	9,440	41.0	+0.1
Conservative	M Todd	1,623	7.1	−5.6
Liberal	E Mason	444	1.9	−1.3
National Front	M.A. Brooks	86	0.4	New
More Prosperous Britain	T Clyde	27	0.1	New
Majority		1,952	8.48	+6.2
Turnout		23,011	71.7	−3.2
Labour hold		Swing		

General election 1979: Glasgow Govan
Party	Candidate	Votes	%	±%
Labour	Andy McMahon	11,676	67.9	+18.4
Conservative	John Harrison Walker	3,188	18.5	+11.4
SNP	Thomas Wilson	2,340	13.6	−27.4
Majority		8,488	49.3	+40.8
Turnout		17,204	75.7	+4.0
Labour hold		Swing		

=== Elections in the 1980s ===
General election 1983: Glasgow Govan
Party	Candidate	Votes	%	±%
Labour	Bruce Millan	20,370	55.0	−12.9
SDP	Ian McDonald	7,313	19.7	New
Conservative	Alastair MacKenzie	7,180	19.4	+0.9
SNP	Peter M. Kindlen	2,207	5.9	−7.7
Majority		13,057	35.3	−14.0
Turnout		37,070	71.6	−4.1
Labour hold		Swing		

General election 1987: Glasgow Govan
Party	Candidate	Votes	%	±%
Labour	Bruce Millan	24,071	64.8	+9.8
SDP	Alasdair Ferguson	4,562	12.3	−7.4
Conservative	Janet Girsman	4,411	11.9	−7.5
SNP	Felix McCabe	3,851	10.4	+4.5
Communist	Douglas Chalmers	237	0.6	New
Majority		19,509	52.5	+17.2
Turnout		37,132	73.4	+1.8
Labour hold		Swing	+8.6	

By-election 1988: Glasgow Govan
Party	Candidate	Votes	%	±%
SNP	Jim Sillars	14,677	48.8	+38.4
Labour	Robert Gillespie	11,123	36.9	−27.9
Conservative	Graeme Hamilton	2,207	7.3	−4.6
SLD	Bernard Ponsonby	1,246	4.1	−8.2
Green	George Campbell	345	1.1	New
Communist	Douglas Chalmers	281	0.9	+0.3
Monster Raving Loony	Lord Sutch	174	0.6	New
Independent	Fraser Clark	51	0.2	New
Majority		3,554	11.9	
Turnout		30,104	60.2	−13.2
SNP gain from Labour		Swing	+33.1	

=== Elections in the 1990s ===
General election 1992: Glasgow Govan
Party	Candidate	Votes	%	±%
Labour Co-op	Ian Davidson	17,051	49.0	−15.8
SNP	Jim Sillars	12,926	37.1	+26.7
Conservative	James Donnelly	3,458	9.9	−2.0
Liberal Democrats	Bob Stewart	1,227	3.5	−8.8
Green	David L. Spaven	181	0.5	New
Majority		4,125	11.9	−40.6
Turnout		34,843	75.9	+2.5
Labour Co-op hold		Swing		

General election 1997: Glasgow Govan
Party	Candidate	Votes	%	±%
Labour	Mohammad Sarwar	14,216	44.1	−4.9
SNP	Nicola Sturgeon	11,302	35.1	−2.0
Conservative	William Thomas	2,839	8.8	−1.1
Liberal Democrats	Bob Stewart	1,918	5.9	+2.4
Scottish Socialist	Alan McCombes	755	2.3	New
Independent	Peter Paton	325	1.0	New
Independent	Islam Badar	319	1.0	New
Independent	Zahid Abbasi	221	0.7	New
Referendum	Kenneth MacDonald	201	0.6	New
BNP	James White	149	0.5	New
Majority		2,914	9.0	−2.9
Turnout		32,245	64.5	−11.4
Labour hold		Swing	−3.2	

=== Elections in the 2000s ===
General election 2001: Glasgow Govan
Party	Candidate	Votes	%	±%
Labour	Mohammad Sarwar	12,464	49.3	+5.2
SNP	Karen Neary	6,064	24.0	−11.1
Liberal Democrats	Robert (Bob) Stewart	2,815	11.1	+5.2
Conservative	Mark Menzies	2,167	8.6	−0.2
Scottish Socialist	Wullie McGartland	1,531	6.1	+3.8
Communist	John Foster	174	0.7	New
Independent	Badar Mirza	69	0.3	New
Majority		6,400	25.3	+16.3
Turnout		25,284	46.8	−17.7
Labour hold		Swing	+8.2	

== Bibliography ==
- Leigh Rayment's Historical List of MPs – Constituencies beginning with "G" (part 2)
