= 1988 Glasgow Govan by-election =

UK parliamentary by-election

- 10 November 1988

Glasgow Govan constituency
	First party	Second party	Third party
Candidate	Jim Sillars	Bob Gillespie	Graeme Hamilton
Party	SNP	Labour	Conservative
Popular vote	14,677	11,123	2,207
Percentage	48.8%	36.9%	7.3%
Swing	▲38.4%	▼27.8%	▼4.6%
MP before election
Bruce Millan
Labour
Subsequent MP
Jim Sillars
SNP

The 1988 Glasgow Govan by-election, for the UK House of Commons constituency of Glasgow Govan, Scotland, was held on 10 November 1988. It was caused by the resignation of Bruce Millan as Member of Parliament for the constituency following his appointment as a European commissioner.

The result of the election provided the first major upset of the by-elections in the 1987-92 Parliament and was seen as embarrassing for the Labour Party, with the former Labour MP Jim Sillars winning the seat for the Scottish National Party with a majority of 3,554 votes and a large swing from Labour to the SNP. However, it would soon be the Tories who were suffering losses in by-elections, although the 1987-1992 Parliament would ultimately end with a fourth consecutive Conservative victory.

== Previous result and background ==
Bruce Millan had first been elected as MP for Govan in the 1983 general election, having previously represented Glasgow Craigton, a constituency which was abolished in that year and partly merged into the redrawn Govan.

At the previous general election Millan, a former Scottish Secretary, had easily held the seat for the Labour Party, increasing his vote share from 55% in 1983 to 64.9%. In contrast, his main rivals, the SDP and the Conservatives, had both seen their shares of the vote drop by over 7%. Meanwhile, the SNP had managed to increase their share of the vote by over 4%. While Millan had been the clear winner, less than 1,000 votes separated the SDP in second and the SNP in fourth place, a significant change from 1983 when the SNP had been over 5,000 votes behind the SDP.

== Result ==
1988 Glasgow Govan by-election
Party	Candidate	Votes	%	±%
SNP	Jim Sillars	14,677	48.8	+38.4
Labour	Bob Gillespie	11,123	36.9	−27.8
Conservative	Graeme Hamilton	2,207	7.3	−4.6
SLD	Bernard Ponsonby	1,246	4.1	−8.2
Green	George Campbell	345	1.1	New
Communist	Douglas Chalmers	281	0.9	+0.3
Monster Raving Loony	Lord Sutch	174	0.6	New
Independent	Fraser Clark	51	0.2	New
Majority		3,554	11.9	N/A
Turnout		30,104	60.2	−13.2
SNP gain from Labour		Swing	+33.1	

== See also ==
- 1889 Govan by-election
- 1973 Glasgow Govan by-election
- Govan
- Elections in Scotland
- Lists of United Kingdom by-elections

== Bibliography ==
- Gerry Hassan, "Glasgow Govan 1988", pp. 509-516, in British By-Elections: 1769-2025: The 88 By-Election Campaigns that shaped our Politics, edited by Iain Dale, Biteback Publishing: London, 2025.
