= 1973 Glasgow Govan by-election =

UK parliamentary by-election

- 8 November 1973

Constituency of Glasgow Govan
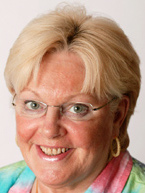
	First party	Second party
		Lab
Candidate	Margo MacDonald	Harry Selby
Party	SNP	Labour
Popular vote	6,360	5,789
Percentage	41.5%	38.2%
Swing	▲31.2%	▼21.9%
	Third party	Fourth party
	Con	Lib
Candidate	John Mair	Peter McMillan
Party	Conservative	Liberal
Popular vote	1,780	1,239
Percentage	11.7%	8.2%
Swing	▼16.5%	N/A
MP before election
John Rankin
Labour
Elected MP
Margo MacDonald
SNP

The 1973 Glasgow Govan by-election was held on 8 November 1973, following the death of John Rankin, Labour Party Member of Parliament for the Glasgow Govan constituency. Rankin had died one month earlier, on 8 October 1973. Rankin had held the seat since 1955. With the exception of a narrow Conservative victory in 1950, the seat had been solidly Labour-held since 1918. For the by-election the Labour Party nominated Harry Selby, a veteran activist in Glasgow and a former Trotskyist. It was later reported that Selby's selection had been controversial with some Labour members who felt that at the age of 61 he was too old to be starting a parliamentary career.

The Conservative Party, long the main opposition in the constituency, nominated John Mair, but as they were in mid-term government, they expected little from the election. Party support had also suffered after refusing the important local employer Upper Clyde Shipbuilders a government loan to continue operations.

The Scottish National Party (SNP) had barely won 10% of the vote in the constituency at the 1970 general election. Nonetheless, nationalist sentiment had increased following the discovery of North Sea oil, and the party had performed very well in the 1971 Stirling and Falkirk by-election, and the 1973 Dundee East by-election. The SNP nominated the young teacher Margo MacDonald.

The Liberal Party, despite having held the constituency for considerable periods prior to 1918, had little base in Glasgow and had not even contested it in 1970. They stood Peter McMillan. The withdrawal of the Liberal Party allowed the Communist Party of Great Britain to poll fourth in 1970, with only 326 votes. With such a low count, they chose not to contest the 1973 by-election.

== Result ==
MacDonald won a shock victory for the SNP; this was the party's fourth Parliamentary election victory, following the 1945 Motherwell by-election, the 1967 Hamilton by-election, and the Western Isles seat in 1970. The party gained an additional 31.2% of the vote, and MacDonald sat alongside Donald Stewart, SNP MP for the Western Isles, in the House of Commons. The Glasgow Herald described the result as a "debacle" for Labour, which proved that "no Labour seat is safe from Nationalist assault." An editorial in the same newspaper on the morning after the result was announced said that the defeat in Govan, which had been thought to be a safe seat, and the failure of Labour to make up ground on the Conservatives in the Edinburgh North by-election on the same day, "were the worst ever" by-election results "for the Labour Party in Scotland."

The Labour vote fell sharply, in an ominous defeat for the party, given that a general election was expected soon. The Conservative vote halved, and the party lost its deposit, placing only just ahead of the Liberals. however the Conservative performance in Govan was eclipsed by the party holding Edinburgh North fairly comfortably.

In the aftermath of the defeat it was reported that there was criticism of the Labour members of Glasgow Corporation for failing to support Selby's campaign. The leader of the Labour group on the Council, the Rev. Geoffrey Shaw conceded that there had been an element of complacency about the campaign, though argued that this was among the Labour Party as a whole, rather than just among councillors.

MacDonald lost the seat at the February 1974 general election to Selby, who himself stood down after only five years. However, the SNP were able to win seven other seats at the 1974 election, and established themselves as a permanent grouping in the British Parliament.

Glasgow Govan by-election, 1973
Party	Candidate	Votes	%	±%
SNP	Margo MacDonald	6,360	41.5	+31.2
Labour	Harry Selby	5,789	38.2	−21.9
Conservative	John Mair	1,780	11.7	−16.5
Liberal	Peter McMillan	1,239	8.2	New
Majority		571	3.3	N/A
Turnout		15,168		
SNP gain from Labour		Swing	+26.7	

== Previous election ==
General election 1970: Glasgow Govan
Party	Candidate	Votes	%	±%
Labour	John Rankin	13,443	60.1	−7.7
Conservative	G. F. Belton	6,301	28.2	+0.1
SNP	Michael Grieve	2,294	10.3	New
Communist	T. Biggam	326	1.5	−2.5
Majority		7,142	31.9	−7.8
Turnout		22,364	63.2	−4.3
Labour hold		Swing		

== See also ==
- 1889 Govan by-election
- 1988 Glasgow Govan by-election

== Bibliography ==
- Gerry Hassan, "Glasgow Govan 1973", pp. 374-381, in British By-Elections: 1769-2025: The 88 By-Election Campaigns that shaped our Politics, edited by Iain Dale, Biteback Publishing: London, 2025.
