= Gilmour baronets of Lundin and Montrave (1897) =

Escutcheon of the Gilmour baronets of Lundin and Montrave

The Gilmour baronetcy, of Lundin and Montrave in the Parishes of Largo and Scoonie in the County of Fife, was created in the Baronetage of the United Kingdom on 1 September 1897 for John Gilmour, son of Allan Gilmour, president of the Scottish Union of Conservative Associations.

He was succeeded by his eldest son, the 2nd Baronet, a prominent Conservative politician who served as Home Secretary between 1932 and 1935. His son, the 3rd Baronet, was also a Conservative politician, Member of Parliament for East Fife from 1961 to 1979.

The family seat is Montrave, near Leven, Fife.

== Gilmour baronets, of Lundin and Montrave (1897) ==
- Sir John Gilmour, 1st Baronet (1845–1920)
- Sir John Gilmour, 2nd Baronet (1876–1940)
- Sir John Edward Gilmour, 3rd Baronet (1912–2007)
- Sir John Gilmour, 4th Baronet (1944–2013)
- Sir John Nicholas Gilmour, 5th Baronet (born 1970)

The heir apparent is the present holder's only son John Edward Arif Gilmour (born 2001).

== Notes ==
Baronetage of the United Kingdom
Preceded by Gamble baronets	Gilmour baronets of Lundin and Montrave; 1 September 1897	Succeeded by Peel baronets
