= Allan Gilmour (businessman, born 1805) =

Canadian businessman (1804–1884)

- Born: 29 September 1805; Craigton, Mearns, Scotland
- Died: 18 November 1884 (aged 79); Glasgow, Scotland
- Occupation: Businessman
- Relatives: Allan Gilmour Sr. (uncle)

Allan Gilmour (29 September 1805 – 18 November 1884) was a businessman. He worked for a firm established by his uncle Allan Gilmour Sr.

== Biography ==
Gilmour was born on 29 September 1805, at Craigton, Mearns, Scotland, the son of John Gilmour, a farmer, and Margaret Urie. In 1819, he was hired as a clerk by Pollok, Gilmour and Company, a firm established by his uncle Allan Gilmour Sr. and partners John and Arthur Pollok.

In 1821, Gilmour was promoted to clerk in the company's booming Miramichi, New Brunswick, branch (Gilmour, Rankin & Co). In 1824, he transferred to a new branch in Bathurst, New Brunswick, and in 1826 joined the Saint John, New Brunswick, operation (Robert Rankin and Co.). In 1828, he joined a new venture, Allan Gilmour and Company, a partnership established by Allan, his uncle (Allan Gilmour, Sr), and William Ritchie of Montreal.

Gilmour died on 18 November 1884, in Glasgow, Scotland.
