= David Gamble =

David Gamble may refer to:

== Baronets ==
- Sir David Gamble, 1st Baronet (1823–1907), of the Gamble baronets
- Sir David Gamble, 3rd Baronet (1876–1943), of the Gamble baronets
- Sir David Arthur Josias Gamble, 4th Baronet (1907–1982), of the Gamble baronets
- Sir David Gamble, 5th Baronet (1933–1984), of the Gamble baronets
- Sir David Hugh Norman Gamble, 6th Baronet (born 1966), of the Gamble baronets

== Others ==
- David Gamble (American football) (born 1971), American football wide receiver
- David Gamble (photographer) (born 1953), British-American photographer and artist
- David Gamble (film editor) (1955–2026), British film editor
- David Gamble, President of the Methodist Conference for 2009
- David Gamble, Procter and Gamble executive who commissioned and lived in the Gamble House

== See also ==
- Gamble (disambiguation)
