= Kinross and Western Perthshire by-election =

Kinross and Western Perthshire by-election may refer to:

- 1938 Kinross and Western Perthshire by-election
- 1963 Kinross and Western Perthshire by-election
