= Henrietta Gilmour =

Scottish photographer (1852–1926)

Lady Henrietta Gilmour
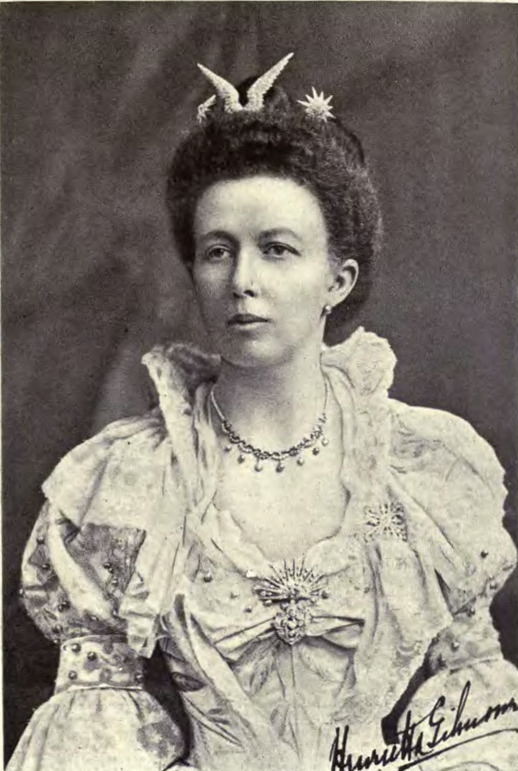
- Born: 1852; Canada East
- Died: 2 January 1926 (aged 73–74); Denbrae House, by Cupar, Scotland
- Known for: First female photographer in Scotland
- Spouse: Sir John Gilmour, 1st Baronet

Henrietta, Lady Gilmour (1852 – 2 January 1926) was a pioneering photographer and winter sportswoman. She is the creator of the Lady Henrietta Gilmour Photographic Collection of 1500 prints and 145 lantern slides held by the University of St Andrews.

== Life ==
Gilmour was born in 1852 in Canada East, the second daughter of David Gilmour (died 1857) the youngest son of Allan Gilmour of Allan Gilmour & Company, a major shipping company with important Canadian connections.

During a visit of her first cousin, John Gilmour (later Sir John Gilmour), she fell in love. They married in 1873 and she returned to Scotland with him to live at Montrave House in central Fife, several miles south of Cupar. At marriage he had estates at both Lundin and Montrave. He later acquired Greenside, Pratis and Kilmux, all nearby in Fife.

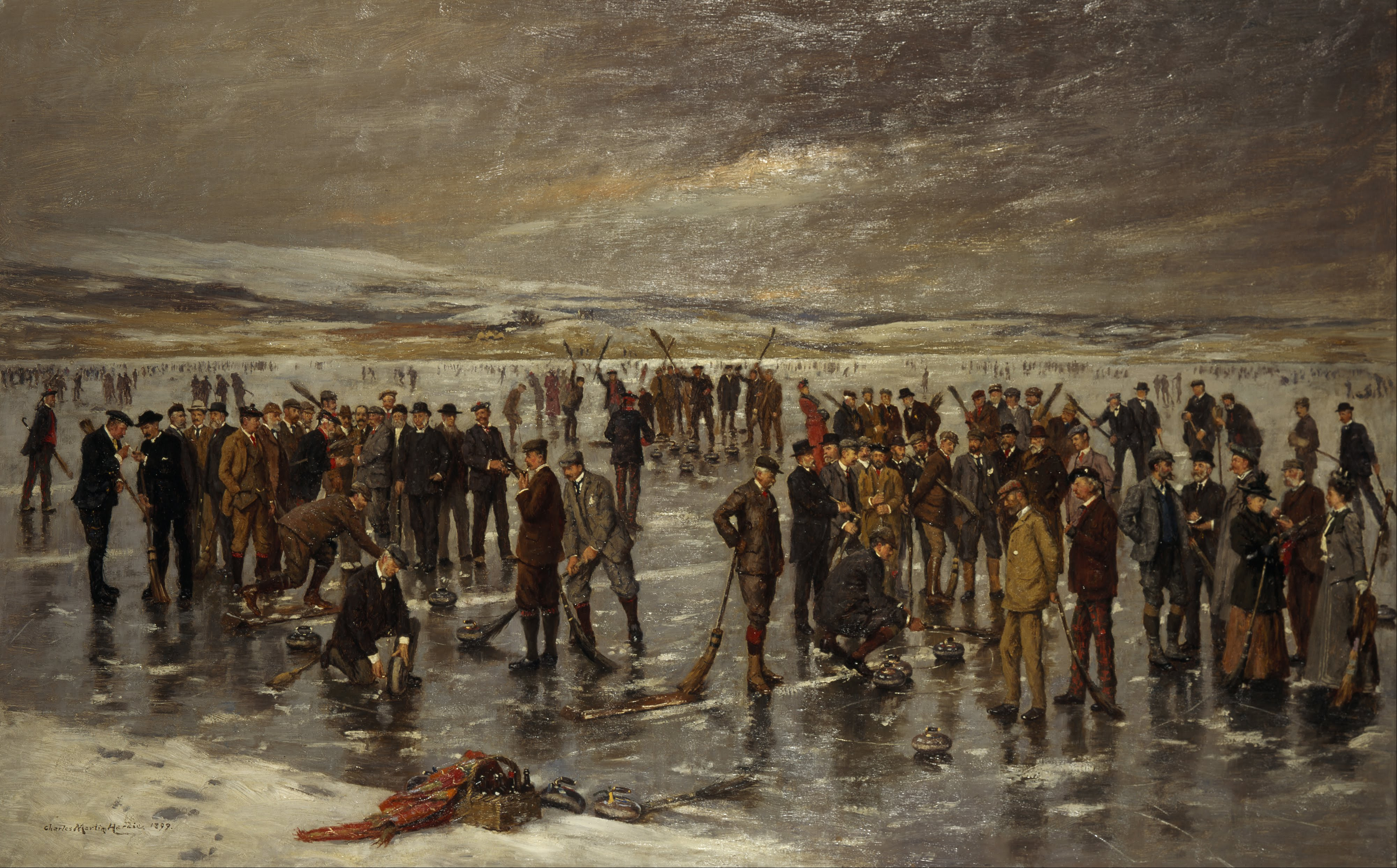
Curling at Carsebreck by Charles Martin Hardie – Gilmour appears on the far right

Her husband had a strong love of curling and this wore off on her, she soon became an accomplished curler. She is one of the first female curlers to be photographed on ice (1895). In 1885 she and her husband founded the Lundin and Montrave Curling Club, and built their own curling pond on their estate, just east of the main house (this was quite fashionable in this period). Unusually, and probably due to her own influence, the club admitted both male and female members. Her own active participation appears to have begun after the birth of her last child in 1889.

Around the same time she took up photography and is the first identified female photographer in Scotland. Her photographic collection, largely of Scottish society, their estate and livestock, and sporting life, was donated by her grandson to the University of St Andrews in 1978. A further 600 negatives were given to the National Museum of Scotland and are held by the Scottish Life Archive. The collection give a personal insight into society life in late 19th century Scotland.

When her husband received a baronetcy from Queen Victoria in June 1897 she became Lady Henrietta Gilmour.

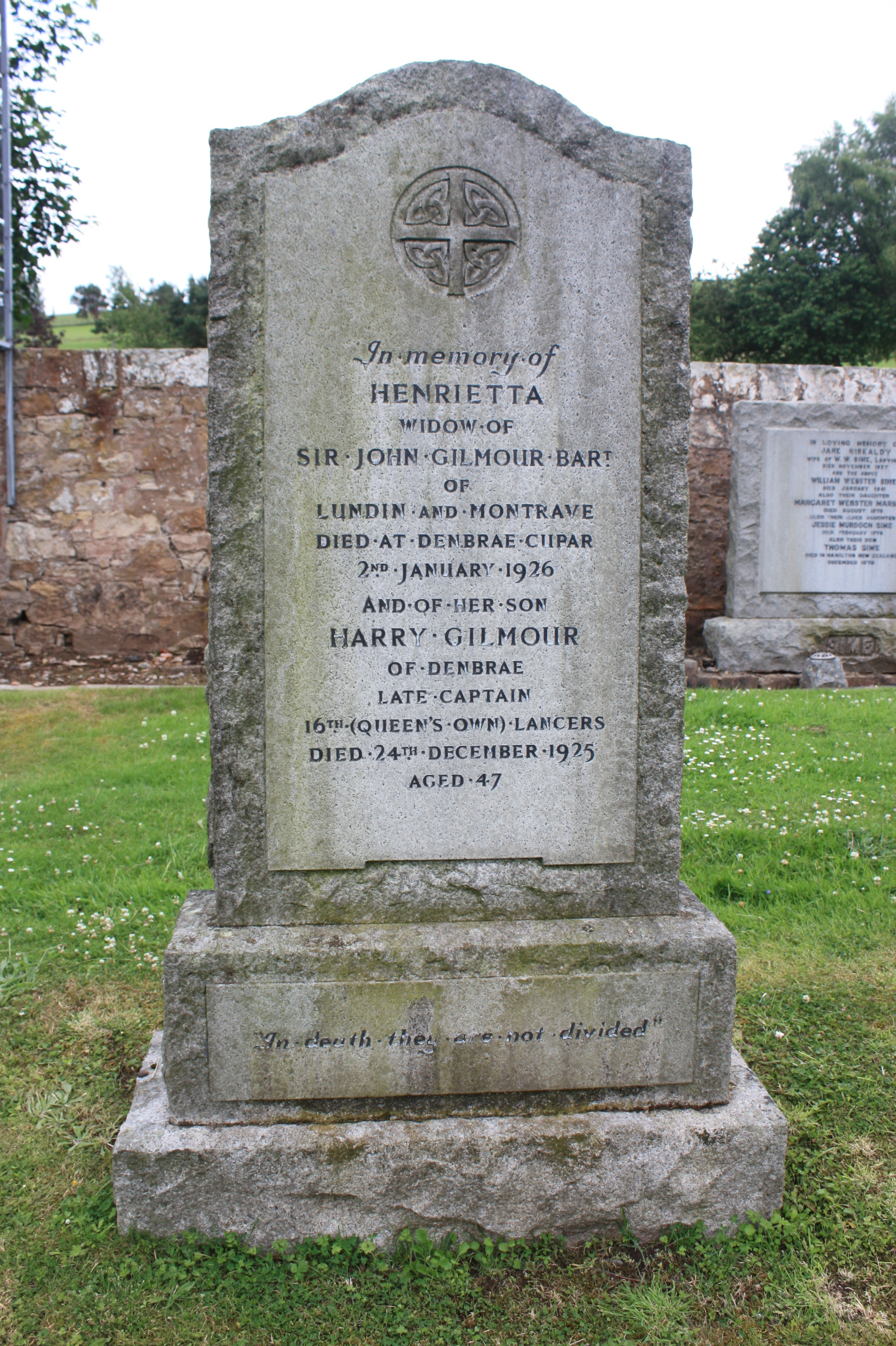
The grave of Lady Henrietta Gilmour, Cupar Cemetery

She died on 2 January 1926 at Denbrae House, a few miles north-east of Cupar and is buried with her son Harry on the southern edge of Cupar Cemetery.

== Family ==
She had seven children: Allan (1874–1878), John (Jack) (1876–1940), Harry (1878–1925), Maud (born 1882), Henrietta (Netta) (born 1884), Ronald (1888–1888) and Douglas (born 1889)

== Artistic recognition ==
Lady Henrietta appears as one of the only two female curlers in the large assembly of famous curlers known as Curling at Carsebeck, painted for the Royal Caledonian Curling Club by Charles Martin Hardie in 1899.
