= Allan Gilmour Sr. =

Allan Gilmour Sr. (October 1775 – 4 March 1849) was a Scottish-born lumber merchant and shipowner.

Born in 1775, Allan Gilmour Sr. was the son of Allan Gilmour and Elizabeth Pollok. He attended the Mearns parish school in the 1780s and early 1790s, and by 1795 ran a small timber business there. By 1802, he had moved to Glasgow and his trade now extended to the Baltic, Russia, and Norway. In 1804, he co-founded the Glasgow-based firm Pollok, Gilmour and Company, together with the brothers John Pollok and Arthur Pollok. Gilmour took charge of pursuing increased international trade for the business, making several trips to North America and Norway to open additional lines of trade. At its peak, and as a result of Gilmour's enterprises, Pollok, Gilmour & Company controlled one of the largest fleets of ships in the world, commanding over 100 vessels. Suffering from the Napoleonic blockade of Baltic timber, he quickly established a new, North American base for the company, sending his brother James Gilmour, and Alexander Rankin to the Miramichi River (New Brunswick, Canada) in 1812. Pollok, Gilmour and Company was soon the largest operator in the British North American timber market, with further branches established at Saint John (1822), Quebec (1828), Montreal (1829), Bathurst, N.B. (1832), and Dalhousie and Campbellton (1833). In 1837 a rift developed between Gilmour and the Pollok brothers. To resolve the dispute, effective leadership was transferred to Robert Rankin, the manager of the Saint John operation.

After his retirement, his health soon declined. He suffered a paralytic stroke in 1849. He died later in the same year leaving most of his property, to the sons of his brother James

== Bibliography ==
- John Rankin, A history of our firm: being some account of the firm of Pollok, Gilmour and Co. and its offshoots and connections, 1804-1920, publ. 1921.
