= 1961 East Fife by-election =

UK parliamentary by-election

The 1961 East Fife by-election was a by-election held for the UK House of Commons constituency of East Fife in Scotland on 9 November 1961. It was won by the Unionist candidate Sir John Gilmour with a majority of 7,066 votes.

== Vacancy ==
The seat had become vacant when the sitting National Liberal Member of Parliament (MP), Sir James Henderson-Stewart had died aged 63 on 3 September 1961. He had held the seat since a by-election in 1933. The result at the previous election was as follows;

General election 1959: East Fife
Party	Candidate	Votes	%	±%
National Liberal	James Henderson-Stewart	26,585	69.95	−0.65
Labour	J. Nicol	11,421	30.05	+0.65
Majority		15,164	39.90	−1.30
Turnout		38,006	75.20	+2.01
National Liberal hold		Swing	−0.65	

== Candidates ==
The Unionist candidate was 49-year-old Sir John Gilmour, an Eton and Cambridge-educated baronet who was a local farmer and landowner, and a decorated war hero. His father, also named John, had been an MP for thirty years, serving as a Cabinet minister during the 1920s and 1930s; including a period as Home Secretary. Gilmour was a reluctant by-election candidate; he had stood unsuccessfully at the 1945 general election in Clackmannan and Eastern Stirlingshire, but preferred local politics and had been a member of Fife County Council since 1955. However, he was pressured to stand by the constituency association which feared the imposition of an unpopular Conservative candidate.

The Labour Party candidate was John Smith, a 23-year-old law student at the University of Glasgow, who would later become Shadow Chancellor in 1987 and more importantly, Leader of the Labour Party in 1992.

The Liberal Party candidate was 30-year-old Donald Leach. He contested Edinburgh West at the 1959 general election. He was the Head of Department of Mathematics at Napier College of Science and Technology, and was educated at John Ruskin Grammar School and Croydon Polytechnic.

== Result ==
Gilmour was elected with a reduced but still large majority, with nearly 50% of the votes.

East Fife by-election, 1961
Party	Candidate	Votes	%	±%
Unionist	John Gilmour	15,948	47.5	−22.4
Labour	John Smith	8,882	26.4	−3.6
Liberal	Donald Leach	8,786	26.1	N/A
Majority		7,066	21.1	−18.8
Turnout		33,616		
Unionist hold		Swing	−9.3	

Gilmour was re-elected at the 1964 general election, with an increased majority over Smith, and held the seat until he stepped down at the 1979 general election. Smith would eventually be elected as Leader of the Labour Party 31 years later, following the resignation of Neil Kinnock.

== See also ==
- East Fife (UK Parliament constituency)
- Fife
- 1933 East Fife by-election
- List of United Kingdom by-elections (1950–1979)
