= Donald Leach (physicist) =

Professor Donald Frederick Leach CBE (24 June 1931 – 25 February 2009), was a Scottish physicist and Liberal Party politician who later joined the Labour Party. He also served as the Principal and Vice Patron of Edinburgh’s Queen Margaret College (now Queen Margaret University) for 11 years from 1985 - 1996.

== Background ==
Leach was born the son of Frederick John Mansell Leach and Annie Ivy Foster. He was educated at John Ruskin Grammar School, Croydon Polytechnic, Norwood Technical College and Dundee College of Technology. In 1952 he married June Valentine Reid. They had two sons and one daughter. He was appointed a CBE in 1996.

== Professional career ==
Leach was Visiting lecturer in mathematics at Dundee Technical College. He was Head of Department of Mathematics, Napier College of Science and Technology, and Principal and Vice Patron of Queen Margaret College.

== Political career ==
Leach was an Executive member of the Scottish Liberal Party. He was Liberal candidate for the Edinburgh West division at the 1959 General Election. He was Liberal candidate for the East Fife division at the 1961 by-election. In 1964 he left the Liberals and joined the Labour Party. He was Labour candidate for the Kinross and West Perthshire division at the 1970 General Election. He did not stand for parliament again.

=== Electoral record ===
General Election 1959: Edinburgh West
Party	Candidate	Votes	%	±%
Unionist	Anthony Stodart	25,976	56.49	
Labour	James K Stocks	14,044	30.54	
Liberal	Donald Leach	5,962	12.97	
Majority		11,932	25.95	
Turnout			80.26	
Unionist hold		Swing		

1961 East Fife by-election
Party	Candidate	Votes	%	±%
Unionist	John Gilmour	15,948	47.4	−22.2
Labour	John Smith	8,882	26.4	−3.6
Liberal	Donald Leach	8,786	26.2	N/A
Majority		7,066	21.02	−18.9
Turnout		33,616		
Unionist hold		Swing	−9.3	

General Election 1970: Kinross and Western Perthshire
Party	Candidate	Votes	%	±%
Conservative	Alec Douglas-Home	14,434	57.4	
SNP	Elizabeth Y. Whitley	4,670	18.6	
Labour	Donald Leach	3,827	15.2	
Liberal	John Calder	2,228	8.9	
Majority		9,764	38.8	
Turnout		25,159	74.0	
Conservative hold		Swing	+0.8	
