= East Fife (UK Parliament constituency) =

Parliamentary constituency in the United Kingdom, 1885–1983

- Former county constituency for the House of Commons
- Subdivisions of Scotland: Fife

1885–1983
- Seats: One
- Created from: Fife and (from 1918) St Andrews Burghs
- Replaced by: North East Fife and Central Fife

East Fife was a county constituency represented in the House of Commons of the Parliament of the United Kingdom from 1885 to 1983. Along with West Fife, it was formed by splitting the old Fife constituency.

It elected one Member of Parliament using the first-past-the-post voting system, and from 1886 to 1918 it was represented by the Liberal Prime Minister (1908–16), H. H. Asquith.

== Boundaries ==
In 1885, the constituency comprised the parishes of Abdie, Abernethy, Anstruther Wester, Anstruther Easter, Auchtermuchty, Balmerino, Cameron, Carnbee, Ceres, Collessie, Crail, Creich, Cults, Cupar, Dairsie, Dunbog, Dunino, Elie, Falkland, Ferry-Port-on-Craig, Flisk, Forgan, Kemback, Kennoway, Kettle, Kilconquhar, Kilmany, Kilrenny, Kingsbarns, Largo, Leuchars, Logie, Monimail, Moonzie, Newburgh, Newburn, Pittenweem, St Andrews, St Leonards, St Monance, Scoonie and Strathmiglo.

In 1918, on the dissolution of the St Andrews Burghs constituency, the burghs of St Andrews, Anstruther Easter, Anstruther Wester, Crail, Cupar, Kilrenny and Pittenweem were added to the constituency. It then consisted of "The Cupar and St. Andrews County Districts, inclusive of all burghs situated therein, together with the burgh of Leven and so much of the Kirkcaldy County District as is contained within the extra-burghal portion of the parish of Scoonie and the parish of Kennoway."

== Members of Parliament ==
Election	Member	Party
1885	John Boyd Kinnear	Liberal
1886	John Boyd Kinnear	Liberal Unionist
1886	H. H. Asquith	Liberal
1918	Alexander Sprot	Unionist
1922	James Duncan Millar	Liberal
1924	Archibald Cochrane	Unionist
1929	James Duncan Millar	Liberal
1931	James Duncan Millar	National Liberal
1933 by-election	James Henderson-Stewart	National Liberal
1961 by-election	John Gilmour	Unionist
1979	Barry Henderson	Conservative
1983	Constituency abolished	

== Election results ==
=== Elections in the 1880s ===
General election 1885: East Fife
Party	Candidate	Votes	%	±%
Liberal	John Boyd Kinnear	4,533	63.8	
Conservative	John Gilmour	2,577	36.2	
Majority		1,956	27.6	
Turnout		7,110	77.0	
Registered electors		9,233		
Liberal win (new seat)				

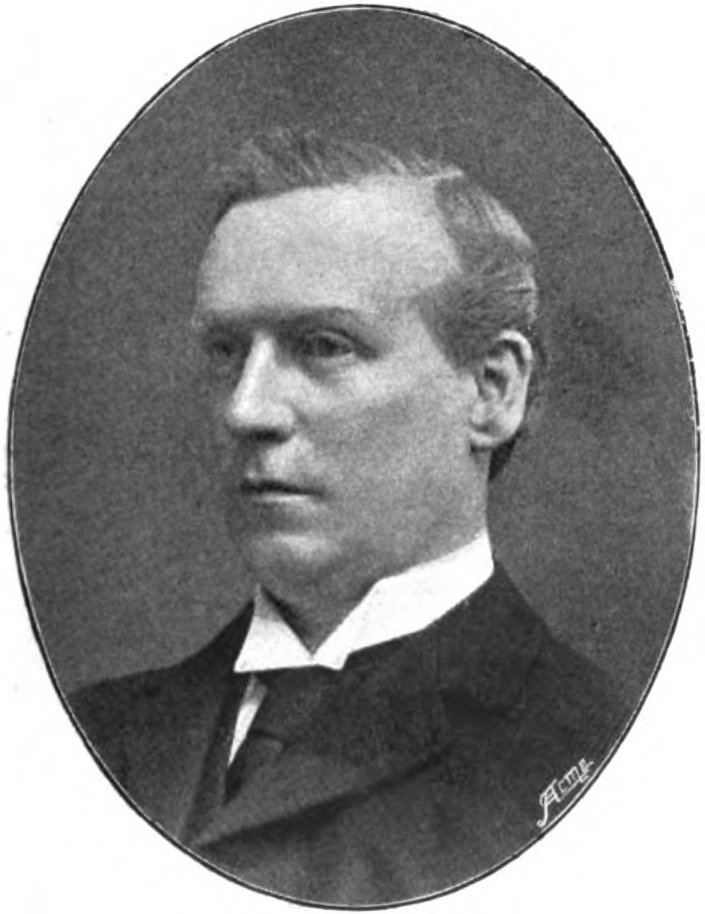
H. H. Asquith

General election 1886: East Fife
Party	Candidate	Votes	%	±%
Liberal	H. H. Asquith	2,863	53.5	−10.3
Liberal Unionist	John Boyd Kinnear	2,489	46.5	+10.3
Majority		374	7.0	−20.6
Turnout		5,352	58.0	−19.0
Registered electors		9,233		
Liberal hold		Swing	−10.3	

=== Elections in the 1890s ===
General election 1892: East Fife
Party	Candidate	Votes	%	±%
Liberal	H. H. Asquith	3,743	52.0	−1.5
Conservative	John Gilmour	3,449	48.0	+1.5
Majority		294	4.0	−3.0
Turnout		7,192	78.7	+20.7
Registered electors		9,133		
Liberal hold		Swing	−1.5	

Asquith is appointed Secretary of State for the Home Department, requiring a by-election.

By-election, 1892: East Fife
Party	Candidate	Votes	%	±%
Liberal	H. H. Asquith	Unopposed		
Liberal hold				

General election 1895: East Fife
Party	Candidate	Votes	%	±%
Liberal	H. H. Asquith	4,332	54.5	+2.5
Conservative	John Gilmour	3,616	45.5	−2.5
Majority		716	9.0	+5.0
Turnout		7,948	84.3	+5.6
Registered electors		9,432		
Liberal hold		Swing	+2.5	

=== Elections in the 1900s ===
General election 1900: East Fife
Party	Candidate	Votes	%	±%
Liberal	H. H. Asquith	4,141	60.4	+5.9
Conservative	Arthur Constable	2,710	39.6	−5.9
Majority		1,431	20.8	+11.8
Turnout		6,851	72.1	−12.2
Registered electors		9,505		
Liberal hold		Swing	+5.9	

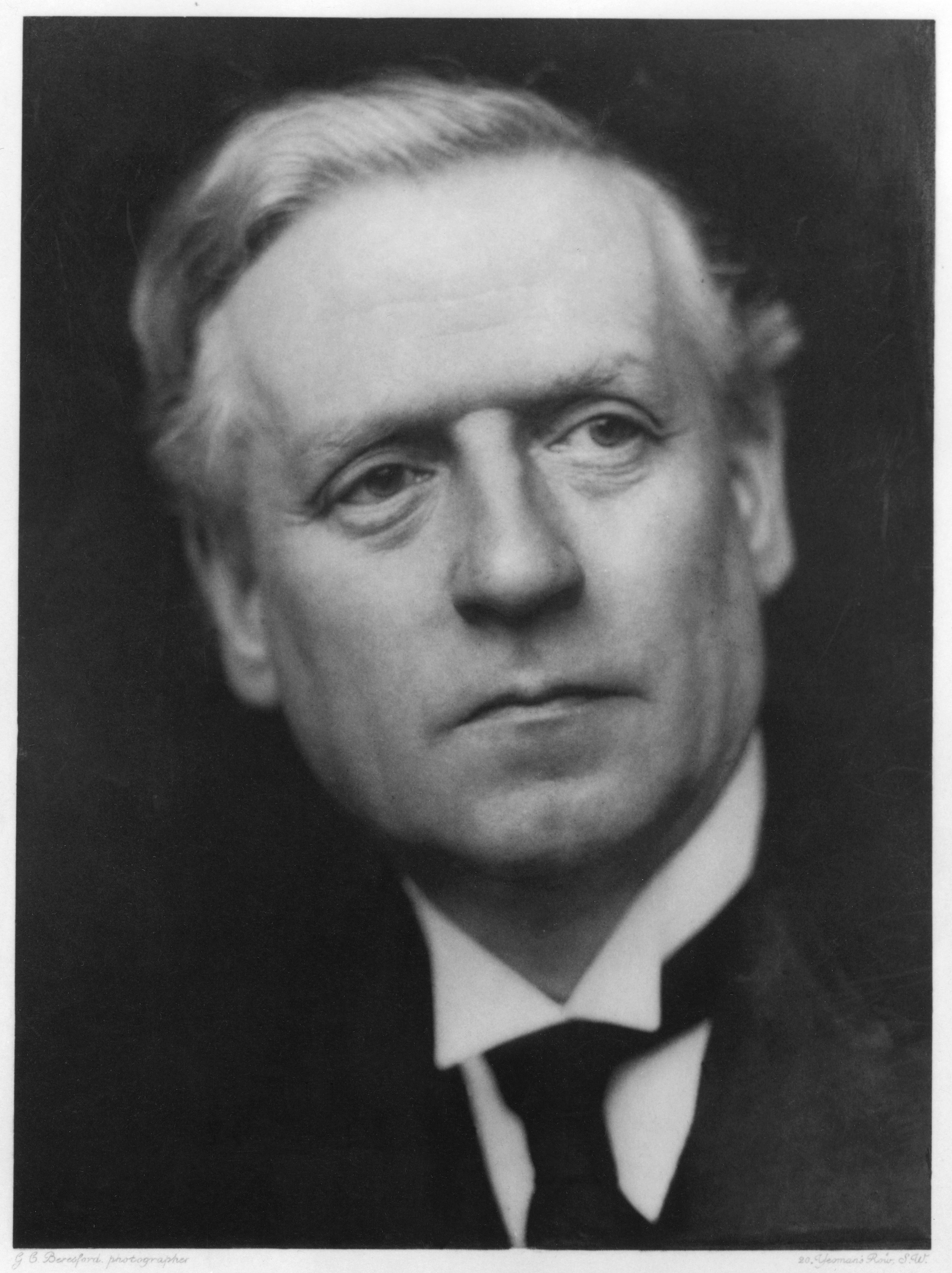
H. H. Asquith

General election 1906: East Fife
Party	Candidate	Votes	%	±%
Liberal	H. H. Asquith	4,723	59.0	−1.4
Conservative	John Gilmour	3,279	41.0	+1.4
Majority		1,444	18.0	−2.8
Turnout		8,002	80.0	+7.9
Registered electors		9,998		
Liberal hold		Swing	−1.4	

=== Elections in the 1910s ===
General election January 1910: East Fife
Party	Candidate	Votes	%	±%
Liberal	H. H. Asquith	5,242	62.2	+3.2
Conservative	Alexander Sprot	3,183	37.8	−3.2
Majority		2,059	24.4	+6.4
Turnout		8,425	81.2	+1.2
Liberal hold		Swing		

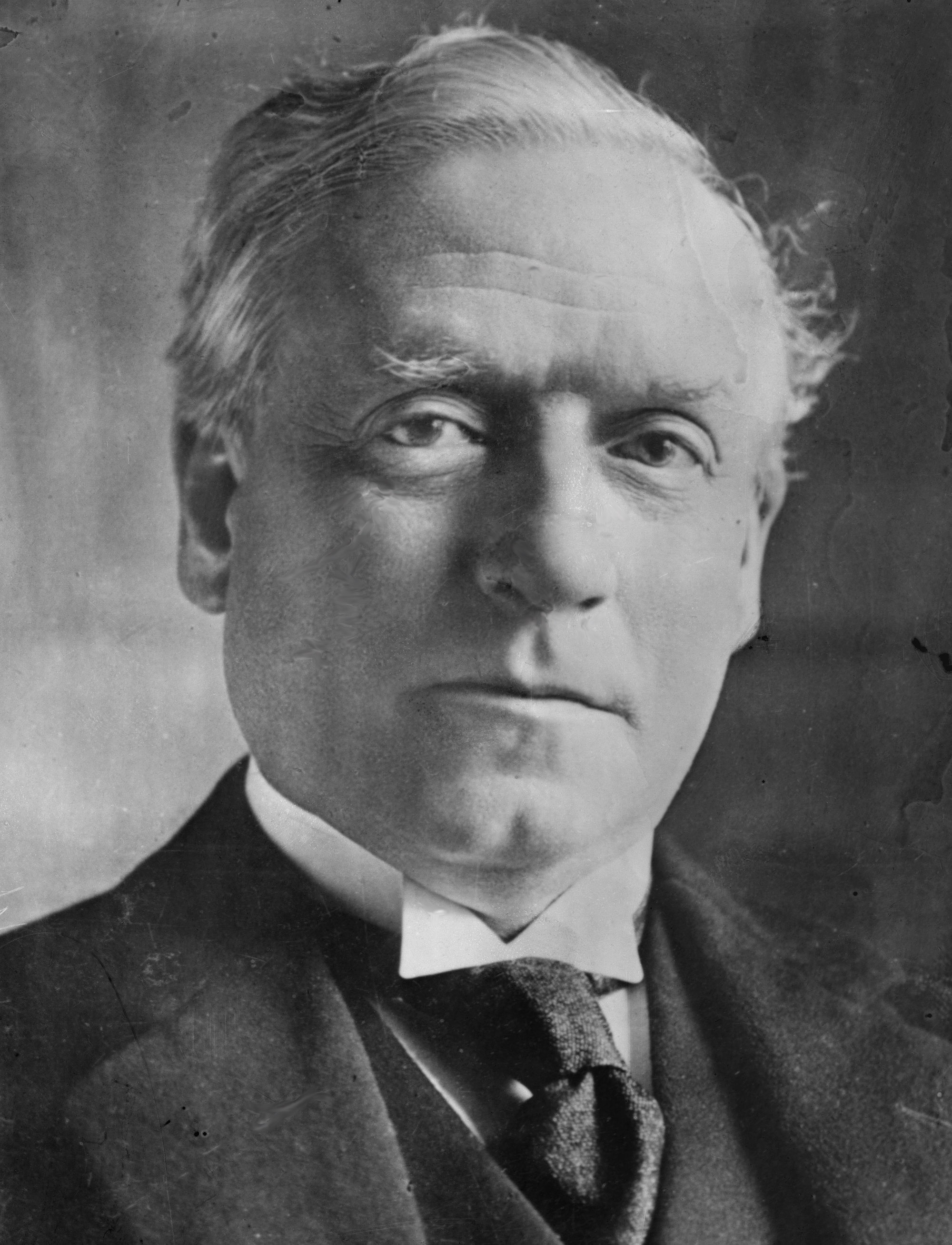
Asquith

General election December 1910: East Fife
Party	Candidate	Votes	%	±%
Liberal	H. H. Asquith	5,149	60.6	−1.6
Conservative	Alexander Sprot	3,350	39.4	+1.6
Majority		1,799	21.2	−3.2
Turnout		8,499	78.0	−3.2
Liberal hold		Swing		

By-election, 1914: East Fife
Party	Candidate	Votes	%	±%
Liberal	H. H. Asquith	Unopposed		
Liberal hold				

General election 1918: East Fife
Party	Candidate	Votes	%	±%
Unionist	Alexander Sprot	8,996	54.2	+14.8
Liberal	H. H. Asquith	6,996	42.2	−18.4
Independent Progressive	William Pritchard Morgan	591	3.6	New
Majority		2,002	12.0	N/A
Turnout		16,581	54.0	−24.0
Unionist gain from Liberal		Swing		

=== Elections in the 1920s ===
Duncan Millar

General election 1922: East Fife
Party	Candidate	Votes	%	±%
Liberal	James Duncan Millar	12,697	56.0	+13.8
Unionist	Alexander Sprot	9,987	44.0	−10.2
Majority		2,710	12.0	N/A
Turnout		22,684	67.2	+13.2
Liberal gain from Unionist		Swing	+12.0	

General election 1923: East Fife
Party	Candidate	Votes	%	±%
Liberal	James Duncan Millar	12,825	55.5	−0.5
Unionist	Alexander Sprot	10,275	44.5	+0.5
Majority		2,550	11.0	−1.0
Turnout		23,100	67.8	+0.6
Liberal hold		Swing	-0.5	

General election 1924: East Fife
Party	Candidate	Votes	%	±%
Unionist	Archibald Cochrane	12,664	53.0	+8.5
Liberal	James Duncan Millar	11,242	47.0	−8.5
Majority		1,422	6.0	N/A
Turnout		23,906	69.2	+1.4
Unionist gain from Liberal		Swing		

General election 1929: East Fife
Party	Candidate	Votes	%	±%
Liberal	James Duncan Millar	14,329	42.9	−4.1
Unionist	Archibald Cochrane	13,748	41.1	−11.9
Labour	W R Garson	5,350	6.0	New
Majority		581	1.8	N/A
Turnout		33,427	73.3	+4.1
Liberal gain from Unionist		Swing	+3.9	

=== Elections in the 1930s ===
1931 general election: East Fife
Party	Candidate	Votes	%	±%
National Liberal	James Duncan Millar	Unopposed		
National Liberal gain from Liberal				

Henderson-Stewart

1933 East Fife by-election
Party	Candidate	Votes	%	±%
National Liberal	James Henderson-Stewart	15,770	52.2	N/A
Labour	Joseph Westwood	6,635	22.0	New
Agricultural Party	J. L. Anderson	4,404	14.6	New
Independent Liberal	David Edwin Keir	2,296	7.6	New
National (Scotland)	Eric Linklater	1,083	3.6	New
Majority		9,135	30.2	N/A
Turnout		30,188	65.6	N/A
National Liberal hold		Swing		

General election 1935: East Fife
Party	Candidate	Votes	%	±%
National Liberal	James Henderson-Stewart	27,915	82.3	+30.1
Labour	Alexander Kerr Davidson	6,016	17.7	−4.3
Majority		21,899	64.6	+34.4
Turnout		33,931	71.0	+5.4
National Liberal hold		Swing		

=== Elections in the 1940s ===
General election 1945: East Fife
Party	Candidate	Votes	%	±%
National Liberal	James Henderson-Stewart	24,765	69.4	−12.9
Labour Co-op	Samuel McLaren	10,920	30.6	+12.9
Majority		13,845	38.8	−25.8
Turnout		35,685	70.8	−0.2
National Liberal hold		Swing		

=== Elections in the 1950s ===
General election 1950: East Fife
Party	Candidate	Votes	%	±%
National Liberal	James Henderson-Stewart	25,749	63.7	−5.7
Labour Co-op	Samuel McLaren	10,694	26.5	−4.1
Liberal	David Alexander Freeman	3,975	9.8	N/A
Majority		15,055	37.2	−1.6
Turnout		40,418	81.1	+1.3
National Liberal hold		Swing		

General election 1951: East Fife
Party	Candidate	Votes	%	±%
National Liberal	James Henderson-Stewart	28,446	70.6	+6.9
Labour	John McGowan	11,844	29.4	+2.9
Majority		16,602	41.2	+4.0
Turnout		40,290	78.7	−2.4
National Liberal hold		Swing		

General election 1955: East Fife
Party	Candidate	Votes	%	±%
National Liberal	James Henderson-Stewart	26,104	70.6	0.0
Labour	John McGowan	10,872	29.4	0.0
Majority		15,522	41.2	0.0
Turnout		36,976	73.2	−5.5
National Liberal hold		Swing		

General election 1959: East Fife
Party	Candidate	Votes	%	±%
National Liberal	James Henderson-Stewart	26,585	69.9	−0.6
Labour	John Nicol	11,421	30.0	+0.6
Majority		15,164	39.9	−1.3
Turnout		38,006	75.2	+2.0
National Liberal hold		Swing		

=== Elections in the 1960s ===
1961 East Fife by-election
Party	Candidate	Votes	%	±%
Unionist	John Gilmour	15,948	47.5	−22.4
Labour	John Smith	8,882	26.4	−3.6
Liberal	Donald Leach	8,786	26.1	N/A
Majority		7,066	21.1	−18.8
Turnout		33,616		
Unionist hold		Swing	-9.3	

General election 1964: East Fife
Party	Candidate	Votes	%	±%
Unionist	John Gilmour	21,001	54.2	−15.7
Labour	John Smith	9,765	25.2	−4.8
Liberal	Derek C Wood	5,075	13.1	N/A
SNP	James Braid	2,635	6.8	New
Independent Loyalist	Leslie M.C. Greene	257	0.7	New
Majority		11,236	29.0	−10.9
Turnout		38,733	77.8	+2.6
Unionist hold		Swing		

General election 1966: East Fife
Party	Candidate	Votes	%	±%
Conservative	John Gilmour	19,323	51.5	−2.7
Labour	Harry Peaker	9,229	24.6	−0.6
SNP	James Braid	5,394	14.4	+7.6
Liberal	Derek A. Barrie	3,574	9.5	−3.6
Majority		10,094	26.9	−2.1
Turnout		37,520	76.1	−1.7
Conservative hold		Swing		

=== Elections in the 1970s ===
General election 1970: East Fife
Party	Candidate	Votes	%	±%
Conservative	John Gilmour	21,619	54.6	+3.1
Labour	Harry Ewing	9,756	24.6	0.0
SNP	James Braid	4,666	11.8	−2.6
Liberal	Willis Pickard	3,577	9.0	−0.5
Majority		11,863	30.0	+3.1
Turnout		39,618	74.4	−1.7
Conservative hold		Swing		

General election February 1974: East Fife
Party	Candidate	Votes	%	±%
Conservative	John Gilmour	21,172	47.9	−6.7
SNP	James Braid	8,593	19.5	+7.7
Liberal	Willis Pickard	7,766	17.6	+8.6
Labour	Bashir Maan	6,634	15.0	−9.6
Majority		12,579	28.4	−1.6
Turnout		44,165	78.8	+4.4
Conservative hold		Swing		

General election October 1974: East Fife
Party	Candidate	Votes	%	±%
Conservative	John Gilmour	16,116	38.8	−9.1
SNP	James Braid	13,202	31.8	+12.3
Labour	Helen Liddell	7,040	16.9	+1.9
Liberal	D.W.C. Docherty	5,247	12.6	−5.0
Majority		2,914	7.0	−21.4
Turnout		41,605	73.7	−5.1
Conservative hold		Swing		

General election 1979: East Fife
Party	Candidate	Votes	%	±%
Conservative	Barry Henderson	20,117	43.0	+4.2
Liberal	Menzies Campbell	10,762	23.0	+10.4
Labour	Henry McLeish	9,339	19.9	+3.0
SNP	J. Marshall	6,612	14.1	−17.7
Majority		9,355	20.0	+13.0
Turnout		46,830	79.0	+5.3
Conservative hold		Swing		

== Sources ==
- Leigh Rayment's Historical List of MPs – Constituencies beginning with "F"
- Election results, 1950 - 1970
- F. W. S. Craig, British Parliamentary Election Results 1974 - 1983
- F. W. S. Craig, British Parliamentary Election Results 1918 - 1949
- F. W. S. Craig, British Parliamentary Election Results 1885 - 1918

== See also ==
- North East Fife Constituency

Parliament of the United Kingdom
Preceded by Worcestershire East	Constituency represented by the chancellor of the Exchequer; 1905–1908	Succeeded by Caernarvon Boroughs
Preceded by Stirling Burghs	Constituency represented by the prime minister 1908–1916	Succeeded by Caernarvon Boroughs
