= William McNair Snadden =

Scottish politician

Sir William McNair Snadden Bt JP

Under-Secretary of State for Scotland
- In office 2 November 1951 – 3 June 1955 Serving with Thomas Galbraith and James Henderson-Stewart
- Prime Minister: Winston Churchill; Anthony Eden
- Preceded by: John Robertson, Peggy Herbison and Tom Fraser
- Succeeded by: Niall Macpherson

Member of Parliament for Kinross and Western Perthshire
- In office 21 December 1938 – 6 May 1955
- Preceded by: Katharine Stewart-Murray
- Succeeded by: Gilmour Leburn

Personal details
- Born: 15 January 1896
- Died: 23 November 1959 (aged 63)
- Party: Unionist

Sir William McNair Snadden, 1st Baronet JP (15 January 1896 – 23 November 1959) was a Scottish Tory politician.

The youngest son of the Reverend James Snadden, the young Snadden was educated at Dollar Academy. In 1915, early in the Great War, he was commissioned into the Argyll and Sutherland Highlanders and served with the British Expeditionary Force in France between 1915 and 1917.

Snadden was elected as the Unionist Member of Parliament for Kinross and West Perthshire at a by-election in 1938, following the resignation of Katharine Marjory Stewart-Murray, Duchess of Atholl, who had left the Scottish Unionist Party in protest against the National government's European policy, and who stood again as an independent; retaining the seat only narrowly, Snadden held it until he stood down at the 1955 general election. He was joint Parliamentary Under-Secretary of State for Scotland from 1951 to 1955.

He was Chairman of the Scottish Food Hygiene Council, President of the Smithfield Club, and President of the Scottish Unionist Association. He was a keen farmer and stock breeder in Perthshire.

On his retirement he was created a baronet. The baronetcy became extinct on his death.

Parliament of the United Kingdom
Preceded by Duchess of Atholl	Member of Parliament for Kinross & West Perthshire; 1938 – 1955	Succeeded by Gilmour Leburn
Baronetage of the United Kingdom
New creation	Baronet (of Coldock); 1955–1959	Extinct
