= Douglastown, New Brunswick =

Coordinates: 47°1′43.6″N 65°29′38.1″W

Communities amalgamated in 1995 to form the City of Miramichi, New Brunswick

Douglastown is a Canadian suburban neighbourhood in the city of Miramichi, New Brunswick.

Douglastown is home to the city of Miramichi's shopping district, which includes a large enclosed shopping mall, multiple strip malls and numerous other stores and businesses.

== History ==
Federal census population history of Douglastown
Year	Pop.	±%
1971	637	—
1976	1,032	+62.0%
1981	1,091	+5.7%
1986	1,133	+3.8%
1991	1,556	+37.3%
Source: Statistics Canada

Prior to municipal amalgamation on January 1, 1995, Douglastown was an incorporated village in Northumberland County.

Douglastown was originally known as Gretna Green and was founded in 1812 by two Scottish immigrants, Alexander Rankin and James Gilmour. The name changed after the Great Miramichi Fire of 1825 to honour Sir Howard Douglas (1776-1861), then the Lieutenant-Governor of New Brunswick.

The post office was established in 1835, but the community wasn't incorporated as a village until 1966.

== See also ==
- List of communities in New Brunswick
