= Gilmour Leburn =

British company director and Member of Parliament

William Gilmour Leburn (30 July 1913 – 15 August 1963) was a British company director and Conservative Member of Parliament for Kinross and West Perthshire from 1955 until 1963. He served in the government of Harold Macmillan as Under-Secretary of State for Scotland; his sudden death opened the way for Macmillan's successor, Sir Alec Douglas-Home to return to the House of Commons.

== Early life ==
Leburn went to Gateside Village School and then Strathallan School, a private school in Perthshire. Instead of university, he became a woodworking apprentice for Gateside Mills Co. Ltd., with which his family had connections.

== Wartime service ==
At the outbreak of the Second World War Leburn became brigade signal officer with the 154th Infantry Brigade of the 51st Highland Division, which served in France. In 1941 he was made staff officer for the brigade, and fought at El Alamein where he was severely wounded: he took two years in hospital to recover. When well, he joined the Staff College, Camberley, where he was promoted to the rank of major. During the war, Leburn was mentioned in despatches on two separate occasions.

== Political activity ==
When demobilised, Leburn returned to the Gateside Mills Company, where he moved into management. He became active politically as a Unionist, and in 1948 was elected to Fife County Council. He enjoyed life on the Council and was Vice Convener in 1951–52. Leburn was selected to follow William McNair Snadden as Unionist candidate for Kinross and West Perthshire when Snadden stood down at the 1955 general election. Leburn easily won what was a safe seat.

== Parliament ==
His maiden speech called for the use of smaller driver-operated buses in rural areas. Leburn was loyal to the government of Anthony Eden over the Suez crisis, signing a motion which commended the Foreign Secretary's policy while condemning the United States government's attitude. He became popular with Conservative MPs, and was Parliamentary Private Secretary to John Maclay (the Secretary of State for Scotland) from 1957.

== Ministerial office ==
After the 1959 general election Leburn was brought into the government as Under-Secretary of State at the Scottish Office. He had specific responsibility for agriculture, forestry and fishing, which led him to intervene to try to solve a dispute between Scots fishermen over the Isle of Lewis in 1961. The next year, he made it clear he was aware of the loophole whereby British fishing vessels could register in Ireland. From September 1962, Leburn switched responsibilities to planning, housing and industry. He encouraged the building of strategic bridges.

== Succession ==
Leburn died suddenly from a heart attack while at his hunting lodge at Lochmore near Lairg, Sutherland in August 1963, aged 50. His seat was at the time the safest Conservative and Unionist seat in Scotland. The local association had selected as his successor George Younger, but the Earl of Home's appointment as Prime Minister meant he needed a seat in the House of Commons. Home disclaimed his peerage under the Peerage Act 1963, and Younger agreed to give up his claim on the seat.

Parliament of the United Kingdom
Preceded by William McNair Snadden	Member of Parliament for Kinross and West Perthshire; 1955–1963	Succeeded by Sir Alec Douglas-Home
Political offices
Preceded by Jack Nixon Browne and Lord John Hope	Under-Secretary of State for Scotland; Served with Niall Macpherson (1959–60), Tam Galbraith (1959–62), Richard Brooman-White (1960–63), Lady Tweedsmuir (1962-); 1959–1963	Succeeded by Anthony Stodart
