= Theophilus Peel =

Sir Theophilus Peel, 1st Baronet (6 September 1837 – 20 May 1911) was an English textile industrialist from Bradford and magistrate. He was created a baronet on 2 September 1897, as part of the 1897 Diamond Jubilee Honours.

== Background ==
He was the third son of William Peel JP (1811–1890), a Bradford merchant, and his wife Lucy Woodhead, daughter of Joseph Woodhead; the eldest son George Frederick (1834–1899) was later his business partner. His father bought Ackworth Park.

William Peel, from Shelf, founded the textile businesses Patterson, Peel & Co. and Wm. Peel & Co. in Bradford, and exported to the United States.

== Peel Brothers ==
Peel Brothers had mills at Thornton and Globe Mills in Bradford, with offices and warehouse at Peel Place. Theophilus Peel and his brother George became directors of the firm in 1866, which from then traded as Peel Brothers; it had been founded in 1845 by Simeon Townend. By 1892 the company employed around 1,000 workers.

=== Simeon Townend ===
The Old Mill at Thornton was founded in 1826 by David Wright; steam power looms were introduced there by Simeon Townend.

The mill at Thornton of S. Townend is in the catalogue of the Great Exhibition 1851 with

Worsted, heald and genappe yarns, spun from English wools[...]

As the Crimean war trade depression affected textiles, the failure of the firm was announced in 1854. Shortly afterwards it was described as a "stoppage": in which the creditors were said to have shown "a disposition to make an arrangement, to avoid bankruptcy."

Simeon Townend died aged 56 in March 1860, called a stuff or worsted manufacturer in newspaper reports.

=== Restructuring ===
The advent of the Peel brothers followed an attempt in 1865 to raise capital for a new worsted mill at Thornton; and a creditors' assignment at the end of that year for George Townend, stuff manufacturer, son of Simeon.

George Townend initially sat on the Peel Brothers board. By 1893 Theophilus Peel was sole proprietor of the company.

== Political candidate ==
In politics Peel was a supporter of William Edward Forster. He stood in Shipley in 1892 as a Liberal Unionist candidate, losing to William Pollard Byles in a close contest.

== Family ==
Peel married in 1890 Isabella Maria Barnes. Known as Ella, Lady Peel, she was the daughter of Capt. Edward Barnes of the 27th (Inniskilling) Regiment of Foot, and granddaughter of Edward Barnes. She survived her husband, dying at Torquay in 1935. There were no children of the marriage, and the title became extinct in 1911.

== Residences ==
An 1866 directory gave Peel's address as Ackworth Park.

In 1891 Peel's was address Birk Lea, Harrogate, the final address of his father who died the previous year leaving £150,000; the following year it was Ashdown, Apperley Bridge. The seat of the baronetcy, Tyersal Hall, is in Pudsey. In 1900 Peel's residence was given as Potterton Hall. At the end of his life he lived at Park Gate, Guiseley.

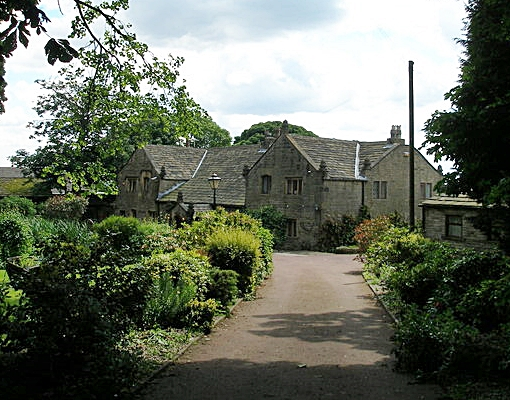
Tyersal Hall, 2012 photograph

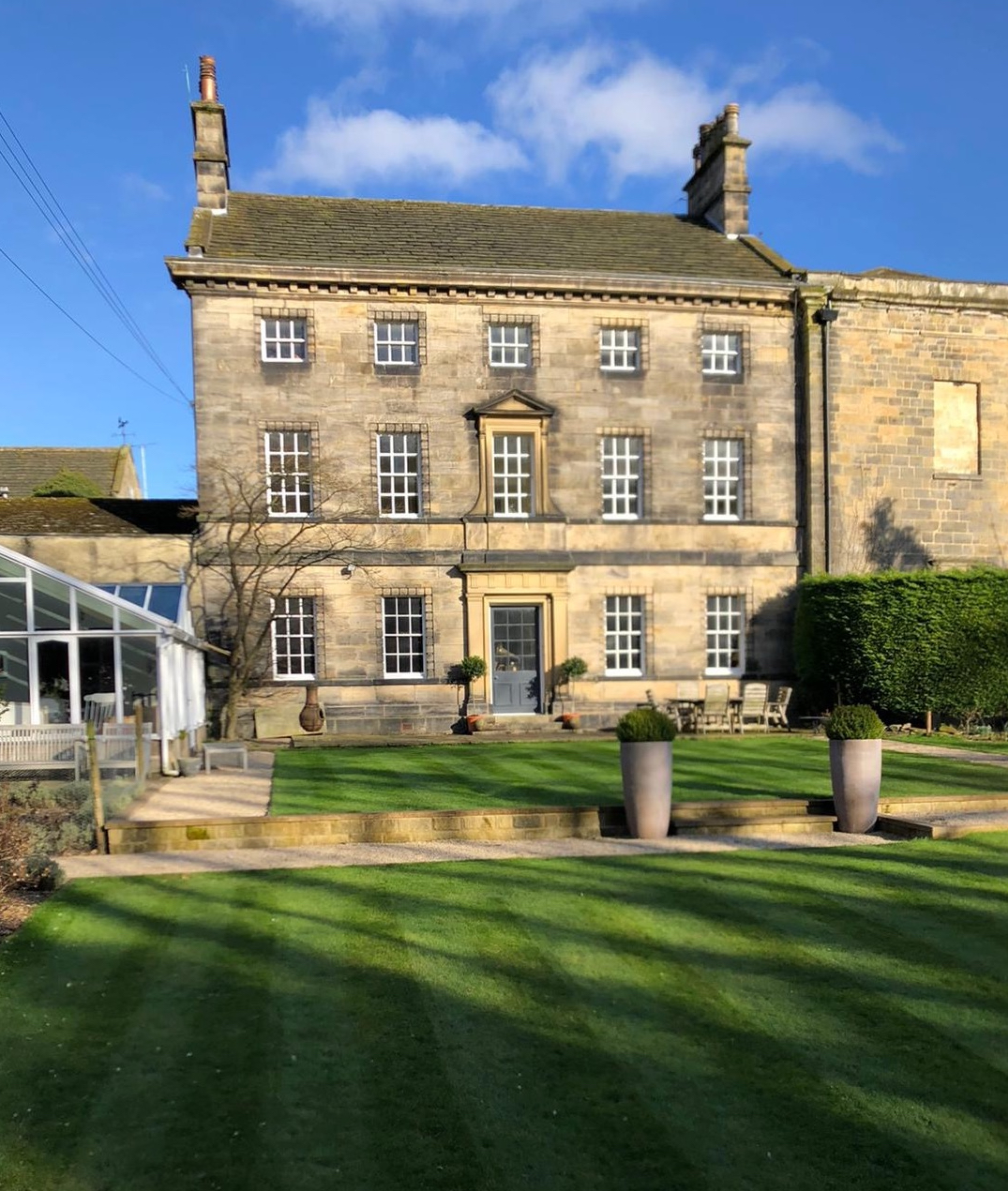
Potterton Hall, west wing, 2003 photograph

== Notes ==
Baronetage of the United Kingdom
Preceded by Gilmour baronets	Peel baronets of Tyersall Hall; 2 September 1897	Succeeded by Pender baronets
