= Kinross and Western Perthshire =

Parliamentary constituency in the United Kingdom, 1918–1983

- Former county constituency for the House of Commons
- Subdivision: County of Kinross; County of Perth

1918–1983
- Seats: One
- Created from: West Perthshire and Clackmannanshire and Kinross-shire
- Replaced by: Perth & Kinross, Stirling, Tayside North and Clackmannan

Kinross and Western Perthshire was a county constituency of the House of Commons of the Parliament of the United Kingdom from 1918 until 1983, representing, at any one time, a seat for one Member of Parliament (MP), elected by the first past the post system of election.

== Boundaries ==
The constituency was first defined by the Representation of the People Act 1918, and first used in the 1918 general election, as one of two county constituencies covering the county of Kinross and the county of Perth. The other was the Perth constituency.

Prior to the 1918 election the county of Kinross was covered, nominally, by Clackmannanshire and Kinross-shire, which also covered, nominally, the county of Clackmannan, and the county of Perth was covered, nominally, by Eastern Perthshire, Perth (as a burgh constituency) and Western Perthshire. Constituency boundaries were defined in terms of the Representation of the People (Scotland) Act 1832 and the Redistribution of Seats Act 1885 and, by these terms, five detached parishes of the county of Perth and one detached parish of the county of Stirling were within the Clackmannanshire and Kinross-shire constituency. Also, by 1918, for local government purposes, under legislation dating from 1889, county boundaries throughout most of Scotland had been redrawn, and detached parishes had become generally historic.

The Representation of the People Act 1918 took account of new local government boundaries in definitions of new constituency boundaries, and the Kinross and Western Perthshire constituency was defined as covering the county of Kinross and the Central, Highland and Western districts of the county of Perth, including the county of Perth burghs of Aberfeldy, Auchterarder, Callander, Crieff, Doune and Dunblane.

1918 boundaries were used also for the general elections of 1922, 1923, 1924, 1929, 1931, 1935 and 1945.

A by-election was held for this seat in 1938 after The Duchess of Atholl resigned her seat in opposition to Neville Chamberlain's policy of appeasement.

For the 1950 general election, as a result of the House of Commons (Redistribution of Seats) Act 1949, the Perth constituency became Perth and East Perthshire, but boundaries were unaltered. 1950 names and boundaries were used also for the general elections of 1951, 1955, 1959, 1964, 1966 and 1970. This also applied to the by-election of late 1963, when newly elected prime minister Sir Alec Douglas-Home won the seat after renouncing his peerage in order to rejoin the House of Commons.

For the February 1974 general election, as a result of the Second Periodical Review of the Boundary Commission, there were minor alterations to the boundaries of the Kinross and West Perthshire constituency and the Perth and East Perthshire constituency. Kinross and West Perthshire was defined as covering the county of Kinross and the Central, Highland and Western districts of the county of Perth, including the county of Perth burghs of Aberfeldy, Auchterarder, Callander, Crieff, Doune, Dunblane and Pitlochry.

February 1974 boundaries were used also in the general elections of October 1974 and 1979.

In 1975, under the Local Government (Scotland) Act 1973, counties and burghs throughout Scotland had been abolished in favour of regions and districts and islands council areas. The county of Kinross and most of the county of Perth had been merged into the Tayside region. The burghs of Callander, Doune, and Dunblane in the county of Perth, the Perth parish of Muckhart and the Western district of the county (except the electoral division of Ardoch) had been merged into the Central region.

New constituency boundaries, taking account of new local government boundaries, were adopted for the 1983 general election. Constituencies defined to cover the Tayside region included Perth and Kinross, and constituencies designed to cover the Central region included Stirling.

== Members of Parliament ==
Election	Member	Party
1918	James Gardiner	Coalition Liberal
Jan 1922	James Gardiner	National Liberal
Nov 1923	James Gardiner	Liberal
Dec 1923	The Duchess of Atholl	Unionist
1938 by-election	William McNair Snadden	Unionist
1955	Gilmour Leburn	Unionist
1963 by-election	Sir Alec Douglas-Home	Conservative
October 1974	Sir Nicholas Fairbairn	Conservative
1983	Constituency abolished: see Perth and Kinross	

== Election results ==
=== Elections in the 1910s ===
General election 1918: Kinross and Western Perthshire
Party		Candidate	Votes	%
	National Liberal	James Gardiner	7,579	52.1
C	Unionist	Archibald Stirling	6,975	47.9
Majority			604	4.2
Turnout			14,554	60.9
Registered electors			23,888	
	National Liberal win (new seat)			
C indicates candidate endorsed by the coalition government.

=== Elections in the 1920s ===
General election 1922: Kinross and Western Perthshire
Party	Candidate	Votes	%	±%
National Liberal	James Gardiner	Unopposed		
National Liberal hold				

Molteno

General election 1923: Kinross and Western Perthshire
Party	Candidate	Votes	%	±%
Unionist	Katharine Stewart-Murray	9,235	50.4	N/A
Liberal	Percy Molteno	9,085	49.6	N/A
Majority		150	0.8	N/A
Turnout		18,320	72.6	N/A
Registered electors		25,221		
Unionist gain from Liberal		Swing	N/A	

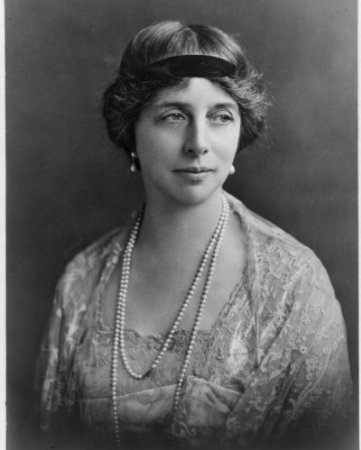
Atholl

General election 1924: Kinross and Western Perthshire
Party	Candidate	Votes	%	±%
Unionist	Katharine Stewart-Murray	13,565	72.0	+21.6
Labour	John MacDiarmid	5,286	28.0	New
Majority		8,279	44.0	+43.2
Turnout		18,851	72.6	0.0
Registered electors		25,978		
Unionist hold		Swing		

General election 1929: Kinross and Western Perthshire
Party	Candidate	Votes	%	±%
Unionist	Katharine Stewart-Murray	12,245	48.6	−23.4
Liberal	George Freeland Barbour	9,128	36.2	New
Labour	W.D. Stewart	3,834	15.2	−12.8
Majority		3,117	12.4	−31.6
Turnout		25,207	75.5	+2.9
Registered electors		33,408		
Unionist hold		Swing	−5.3	

=== Elections in the 1930s ===
General election 1931: Kinross and Western Perthshire
Party	Candidate	Votes	%	±%
Unionist	Katharine Stewart-Murray	16,228	60.6	+12.0
Liberal	T. Atholl Robertson	10,533	39.4	+3.2
Majority		5,695	21.2	+8.8
Turnout		26,781	79.0	+3.5
Unionist hold		Swing	+4.4	

General election 1935: Kinross and Western Perthshire
Party	Candidate	Votes	%	±%
Unionist	Katharine Stewart-Murray	15,238	60.2	−0.4
Liberal	Mary Isabella MacDonald	10,069	39.8	+0.4
Majority		5,169	20.4	−0.8
Turnout		25,307	73.9	−5.1
Unionist hold		Swing	-0.4	

1938 Kinross and Western Perthshire by-election
Party	Candidate	Votes	%	±%
Unionist	William McNair Snadden	11,808	52.9	−8.3
Independent	Katharine Stewart-Murray	10,495	47.1	−13.1
Majority		1,313	5.8	−14.6
Turnout		22,303	66.6	−6.7
Unionist hold		Swing		

General Election 1939–40:

Another General Election was due to take place before the end of 1940. The political parties had been making preparations for that election and by autumn 1939, the following candidates had been selected:

- Unionist: William McNair Snadden
- Liberal: Mary Isabella MacDonald

=== Elections in the 1940s ===
General election 1945: Kinross and Western Perthshire
Party	Candidate	Votes	%	±%
Unionist	William McNair Snadden	16,536	68.0	+15.1
Labour	C. McKinnon	7,782	32.0	New
Majority		8,754	36.0	+30.2
Turnout		24,318	67.6	+1.0
Unionist hold		Swing		

=== Elections in the 1950s ===
General election 1950: Kinross and Western Perthshire
Party	Candidate	Votes	%	±%
Unionist	William McNair Snadden	15,299	55.4	−12.6
Liberal	Ian Alistair Duncan Millar	7,183	26.0	New
Labour	D. McLaren	5,124	18.6	−13.4
Majority		8,116	29.4	−6.6
Turnout		27,606	76.9	+9.3
Unionist hold		Swing		

General election 1951: Kinross and Western Perthshire
Party	Candidate	Votes	%	±%
Unionist	William McNair Snadden	19,625	76.2	+20.8
Labour	Isobel McGregor	6,124	23.8	+5.2
Majority		13,501	52.4	+23.0
Turnout		25,749	73.2	−3.7
Unionist hold		Swing		

General election 1955: Kinross and Western Perthshire
Party	Candidate	Votes	%	±%
Unionist	Gilmour Leburn	18,133	75.2	−1.0
Labour	John Bayne	5,975	24.8	+1.0
Majority		12,158	50.4	−2.0
Turnout		24,108	70.4	−2.8
Unionist hold		Swing		

General election 1959: Kinross and Western Perthshire
Party	Candidate	Votes	%	±%
Unionist	Gilmour Leburn	16,256	68.2	−7.0
Labour	Gregor Mackenzie	4,008	16.8	−8.0
SNP	Arthur Donaldson	3,568	15.0	New
Majority		12,248	51.4	+1.0
Turnout		23,832	71.0	+0.6
Unionist hold		Swing		

=== Elections in the 1960s ===
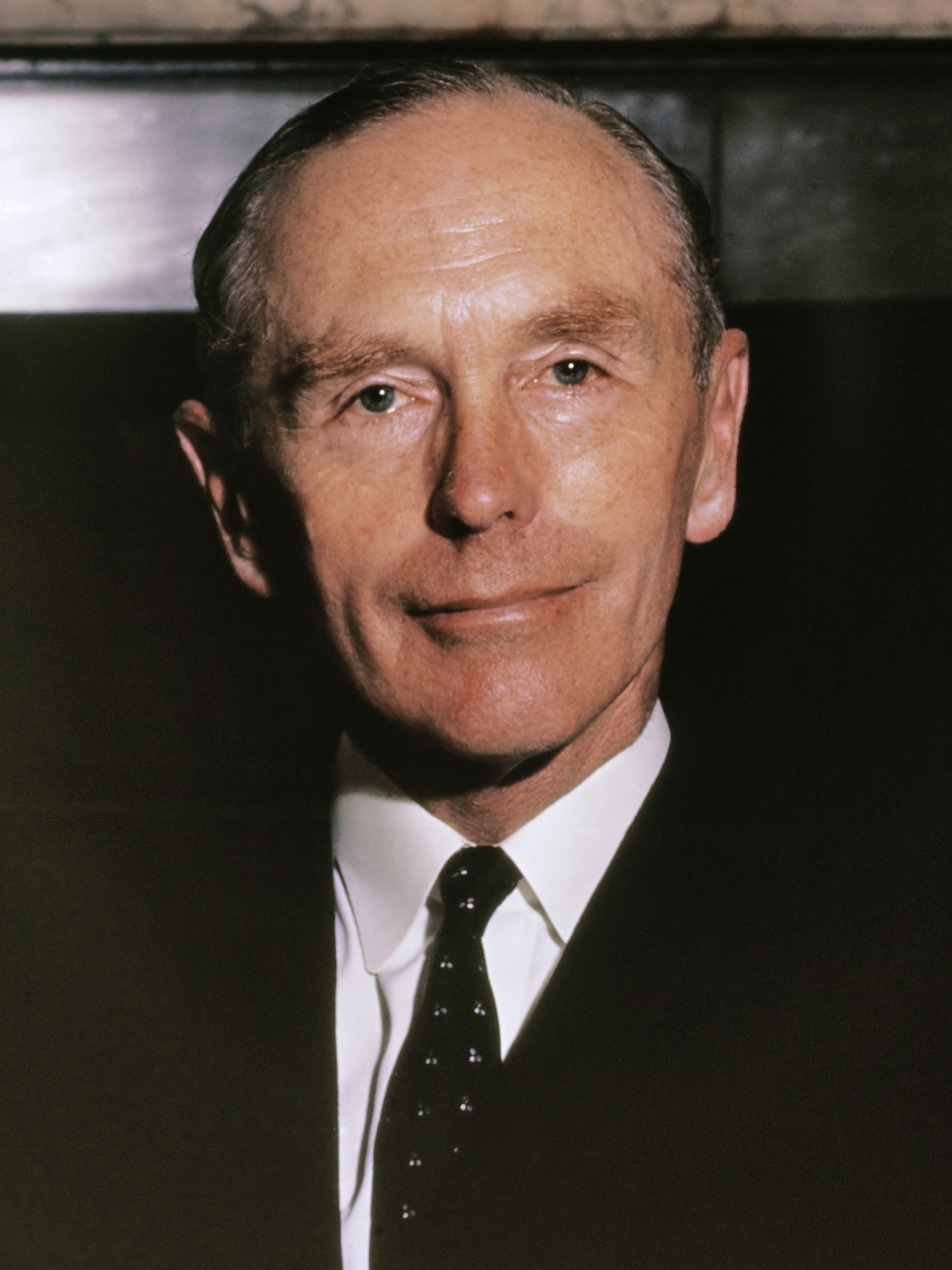
Douglas-Home

1963 Kinross and Western Perthshire by-election
Party	Candidate	Votes	%	±%
Unionist	Alec Douglas-Home	14,147	57.4	−10.8
Liberal	Ian Alistair Duncan Millar	4,819	19.5	New
Labour	Andrew Forrester	3,752	15.2	−1.6
SNP	Arthur Donaldson	1,801	7.3	−7.7
Ind. Unionist	Ian Smith	78	0.3	New
Independent	Willie Rushton	45	0.2	New
Light and Dark Blue Conservative Party	Richard Wort	23	0.1	New
Majority		9,328	37.9	−13.5
Turnout		24,665	76.1	+5.1
Unionist hold		Swing		

General election 1964: Kinross and Western Perthshire
Party	Candidate	Votes	%	±%
Unionist	Alec Douglas-Home	16,659	66.6	−1.6
Labour	Andrew Forrester	4,687	18.8	+2.0
SNP	Arthur Donaldson	3,522	14.1	−0.9
Communist	Hugh MacDiarmid	127	0.5	New
Majority		11,972	47.8	−3.6
Turnout		24,995	75.9	+4.9
Unionist hold		Swing		

General election 1966: Kinross and Western Perthshire
Party	Candidate	Votes	%	±%
Conservative	Alec Douglas-Home	14,466	60.8	−5.8
SNP	Arthur Donaldson	4,884	20.5	+6.4
Labour	Brian K. Parnell	4,461	18.7	−0.1
Majority		9,582	40.3	−7.5
Turnout		23,811	73.5	−2.4
Conservative hold		Swing	-2.95	

=== Elections in the 1970s ===
General election 1970: Kinross and Western Perthshire
Party	Candidate	Votes	%	±%
Conservative	Alec Douglas-Home	14,434	57.4	−3.4
SNP	Elizabeth Y. Whitley	4,670	18.6	−1.9
Labour	Donald Leach	3,827	15.2	−3.5
Liberal	John Calder	2,228	8.9	New
Majority		9,764	38.8	−1.5
Turnout		25,159	74.0	+0.5
Conservative hold		Swing	-0.8	

General election February 1974: Kinross and Western Perthshire
Party	Candidate	Votes	%	±%
Conservative	Alec Douglas-Home	14,356	52.9	−4.5
SNP	Duncan C. Murray	6,274	23.1	+4.5
Liberal	David A. Barrie	3,807	14.0	+5.1
Labour	Danus Skene	2,694	9.9	−5.3
Majority		8,082	29.8	−9.0
Turnout		27,131	77.5	+3.5
Conservative hold		Swing	-4.5	

General election October 1974: Kinross and Western Perthshire
Party	Candidate	Votes	%	±%
Conservative	Nicholas Fairbairn	11,034	41.7	−11.2
SNP	Derek Cameron	10,981	41.5	+18.4
Liberal	David A. Barrie	2,427	9.2	−4.8
Labour	Danus Skene	2,028	7.6	−2.3
Majority		53	0.2	−27.6
Turnout		26,470	75.1	−2.4
Conservative hold		Swing	-14.8	

General election 1979: Kinross and Western Perthshire
Party	Candidate	Votes	%	±%
Conservative	Nicholas Fairbairn	15,523	50.5	+8.8
SNP	Ian Smith	9,045	29.4	−12.1
Liberal	J. Chapman	3,572	11.6	+2.4
Labour	D.R. Macleod	2,593	8.4	+0.8
Majority		6,478	21.1	+19.9
Turnout		30,733	79.5	+4.4
Conservative hold		Swing	+10.4	

== Notes and references ==
Parliament of the United Kingdom
Vacant 20 October – 8 November 1963 Title last held by Bromley	Constituency represented by the prime minister 1963–1964	Succeeded by Huyton
Preceded by Huyton	Constituency represented by the leader of the opposition 1964–1965	Succeeded by Bexley
