= Katharine Stewart-Murray, Duchess of Atholl =

British noblewoman

Her Grace The Duchess of Atholl DBE
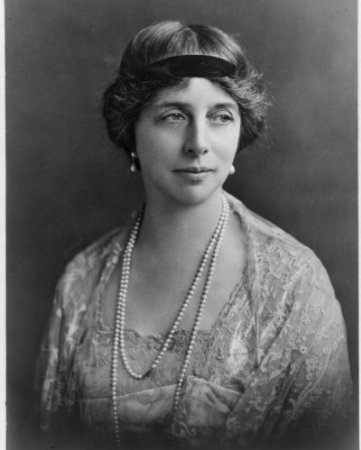

Member of Parliament for Kinross and West Perthshire
- In office 6 December 1923 – 28 November 1938
- Preceded by: James Gardiner
- Succeeded by: William McNair Snadden

Personal details
- Born: Katharine Marjory Ramsay; 6 November 1874 Edinburgh, Scotland
- Died: 21 October 1960 (aged 85) Edinburgh, Scotland
- Party: Scottish Unionist Party
- Spouse: John Stewart-Murray, 8th Duke of Atholl (m. 1899; died 1942)
- Parent: Sir James Henry Ramsay, 10th Baronet
- Education: Royal College of Music

Katharine Marjory Stewart-Murray, Duchess of Atholl, DBE (née Ramsay; 6 November 1874 – 21 October 1960), known as the Marchioness of Tullibardine from 1899 to 1917, was a Scottish noblewoman and Scottish Unionist Party politician. She was the first woman to be elected as a Member of Parliament (MP) in Scotland, despite having campaigned against women's suffrage before it was granted in 1918. She was the first woman to serve in a British Conservative government. She later found herself at odds with her party and resigned the Whip in 1935 over the India Bill. She became strongly anti-fascist in the 1930s and criticised authoritarian regimes in Soviet Russia, Italy and Spain as well as Nazi Germany. She was given the nickname 'Red Duchess' for these views.

== Early life and education ==
Katharine Marjory Ramsay was born in Edinburgh on 6 November 1874, the daughter of Sir James Henry Ramsay, 10th Baronet and Charlotte Fanning Ramsay (née Stewart). She was educated at Wimbledon High School and the Royal College of Music. During her school years she was known as Kitty Ramsay. On 20 July 1899, she married John Stewart-Murray, Marquess of Tullibardine, who succeeded his father as 8th Duke of Atholl in 1917, whereupon she became formally styled Duchess of Atholl.

== Political career ==
Stewart-Murray was active in Scottish social service and local government and in 1912 served on the hugely influential "Highlands and Islands Medical Service Committee" (authors of the Dewar Report) that has been widely credited with creating the forerunner of the National Health Service. She was the chairman of the Consultative Council on Highlands and Islands.

=== Anti-suffrage ===
As the Marchioness of Tullibardine she was an opponent of female suffrage, with Leah Leneman describing her as 'a key speaker at the most important Scottish anti-suffrage demonstration', which took place in 1912. In 1913 she became vice-president of the branch of the Anti-Suffrage League based in Dundee.

=== Political career ===
Despite this opposition to women gaining the right to vote in parliamentary elections, Stewart-Murray went on to be the Scottish Unionist Member of Parliament (MP) for Kinross and West Perthshire from 1923 to 1938, and served as Parliamentary Secretary to the Board of Education from 1924 to 1929, the first woman other than a mistress of the robes to serve in a British Conservative government. She was the first woman elected to represent a Scottish seat at Westminster.

It has been argued that, like other early female MPs in the UK, Stewart-Murray "inherited" her seat from her husband. However, her husband had stood down from the former West Perthshire seat in 1917, when he succeeded to the dukedom, and it had then been won by a Liberal candidate in both 1918 and 1922. Her victory in 1923 was not seen as "a foregone conclusion".

The fact that, prior to 1918, Atholl had been opposed to women's suffrage led to her being criticised in parliament by her Conservative colleague Nancy Astor. Stewart-Murray often placed her political allegiance ahead of gender unity, and campaigned for the male Unionist candidate in Edinburgh South at the 1922 general election against the Liberal Catherine Buchanan Alderton, though Labour and Liberal women had refused to campaign against Lady Astor in Plymouth.

Stewart-Murray resigned the Conservative Whip first in 1935 over the India Bill and the "national-socialist tendency" of the government's domestic policy. Resuming the Whip, she resigned it again in 1938 in opposition to Neville Chamberlain's policy of appeasement of Adolf Hitler and to the Anglo-Italian agreement. According to her biography, A Working Partnership, she was then deselected by her local party. She took Stewardship of the Chiltern Hundreds on 28 November 1938. She stood unsuccessfully in the subsequent by-election as an Independent candidate.

=== Anti-fascism ===
Stewart-Murray argued that she actively opposed totalitarian regimes and practices. In 1931, she published The Conscription of a People—a protest against the abuse of human rights in the Soviet Union. After reading the German edition of Mein Kampf she also condemned Nazi Germany. In 1936, she was involved in a long-running battle in the pages of various newspapers with Lady Houston after the latter had become notorious for her outspoken support of Benito Mussolini. Stewart-Murray had taken issue with Houston calling in the pages of the Saturday Review for Edward VIII to become a dictator in imitation of European interwar dictatorships.

In February 1937 three leading British women made a tour of Romania, Czechoslavakia and Yugoslavia. They were Dorothy Layton, Eleanor Rathbone and the Duchess of Atholl. They observed the conditions and they were received by Deputy Františka Zeminová in Prague. Zeminová used the occasion to laud the support of Britain. Atholl recalls that it was at the prompting of Ellen Wilkinson that in April 1937 she, Rathbone, and Wilkinson went to Spain to observe the effects of the Spanish Civil War. In Valencia, Barcelona and Madrid she saw the impact of Luftwaffe bombing on behalf of the Nationalists, visited prisoners of war held by the Republicans and considered the impact of the conflict on women and children, in particular.

Her book Searchlight on Spain resulted from the involvement, and sold more than 100,000 copies in its first week of publication. Her support for the Republican side in the conflict led to her being nicknamed by some the Red Duchess. She became active in the National Joint Committee for Spanish Relief, a cross-party group coordinating aid to Spain. She later served as the group's chairwoman. She was instrumental in persuading the British government to accept child refugees fleeing the combat, 4,000 of which arrived on the SS Habana which sailed from Bilbao to Southampton in May 1937.

Her role in the Spanish Civil War, however, was years later criticized by George Orwell, who saw the Duchess as the "pet of the Daily Worker", and someone who "lent the considerable weight of her authority to every lie the Communists happened to be uttering at the moment. Now she is fighting against the monster that she helped create. I am sure that neither she nor her Communist ex-friends see any moral in this."

Shortly before or even during 1938, she travelled to Romania where she visited Satu Mare Romanian Women Association in the city of Satu Mare, aiming to support the Romanian cause to preserve the state borders established in 1918, and to keep Hungary from regaining the territory that it lost in the Treaty of Trianon. She campaigned against the Soviet control of Poland, Czechoslovakia and Hungary as the chairman of the League for European Freedom in Britain from 1945.

== Other work ==
Stewart-Murray was a keen composer, setting music to accompany the poetry of Robert Louis Stevenson. She was closely involved in her husband's regiment The Scottish Horse and composed the melody "The Scottish Horse" to be played on bagpipes. In 1958, she published a description of her life with her husband entitled Working Partnership.

She was a vice-president of the Girls' Public Day School Trust from 1924 to 1960. In 1927 she opened the new wing at Clifton High School, Bristol with the head, Eleanor Addison Phillips and the architect Sir George Oatley.

== Honours ==
She was appointed Dame Commander of the Order of the British Empire (DBE) in the 1918 Birthday Honours for her wartime service.

As Dowager Duchess of Atholl she took over the appointment of Honorary Colonel of The Regiment of Scottish Horse from 1942, until she relinquished it in 1952.

== Death ==
Katharine, Duchess of Atholl, died in a nursing home in Edinburgh, aged 85, on 21 October 1960. She is buried in the grounds of Blair Castle.

== Publications ==
- Stewart-Murray, Katharine Marjory, ed. (1908), Military History of Perthshire (1660–1899) and (1899–1902), Perth: R A & J Hay (2 Volumes)
- Conscription of a People, 1931
- Women and Politics, Philip Allen, 1931
- Main Facts of the Indian Problem, 1933
- Searchlight on Spain, Middlesex: Penguin, 1938 1st, 2nd & 3rd editions
- Working partnership: being the lives of John George, 8th Duke of Atholl, and of his wife, Katharine Marjory Ramsay, London: Arthur Baker Ltd, c. 1958

== See also ==
- Duke of Atholl
- Julia Pirie

== Sources ==
=== Primary sources ===
Records relating to Atholl can be found at:

- Blair Atholl Castle - personal papers of Katherine, Duchess of Atholl
- British Library Manuscript Section – correspondence with Lord Cecil, 1936–1944, Ref Add MS 51142 (web site)
- Churchill Archives, Cambridge University – correspondence with Sir E L Spears, Ref SPRS (on-line catalogue).
- British Library, Asia, Pacific and Africa Collections – correspondence and papers relating to Indian self-government, 1928–1935. Ref:MSS Eur 903 (web site)
- National Library of Scotland, Manuscripts Collections, correspondence and papers regarding the Scottish National War Memorial, 1919–1958, Ref: Acc 4714. (web site).
- King's College London Liddell Hart Centre for Military Archives. Ref: LIDDELL: 1/27 (on-line catalogue).
- Institute of Education Archives, Girls' Day School Trust collection 'Katherine, Duchess of Atholl', 1960. Ref: GDS/2/3/1 (on-line catalogue).

Source: "Murray, Katharine Marjory Stewart (1874–1960) née Ramsay, Duchess of Atholl, Conservative MP GB/NNAF/P151487". National Register of Archives. The National Archives.

=== Published sources ===
- Maitland, Frank (1937), Searchlight on the Duchess of Atholl, Edinburgh: Revolutionary Socialist Party
- Cowling, Maurice (1975), The Impact of Hitler - British Politics and Policy 1933–1940, Cambridge: Cambridge University Press, p. 403, ISBN 0-521-20582-4
- Stobaugh, Beverly Parkers (c. 1978), Women and Parliament, 1918–1970, Hicksville, NY: Exposition Press, ISBN 0-682-49056-3
- Hetherington, Shelia (1989), Katharine Atholl 1874–1960, Aberdeen University Press
- Ball, Stuart, 'The politics of appeasement: the fall of the Duchess of Atholl and the Kinross and West Perth by-election, December 1938’, Scottish Historical Review, vol. 69, no. 1, (1990) pp. 49-83.
- Williams, A. Susan, Ladies of Influence: Women of the Elite in Interwar Britain (London: Allen Lane, 2000), ISBN 0713992611
- Knox, William (2006), "Chapter 8: Katherine, Duchess of Atholl: The Red Duchess?", Lives of Scottish Women. Women and Scottish Society, 1800–1980, Edinburgh: Edinburgh University Press, ISBN 0-7486-1788-4
- MacLeod, Douglas (2005), Morningside Mata Haris: how MI6 deceived Scotland's great and good, Edinburgh: Birlinn, ISBN 978-1-84341-021-8
- Gray, Amy (2025). Red Duchess: Kitty Atholl, a Rebel in Westminster (1st ed.). London: History Press Limited, The. ISBN 978-1-80399-645-5
- S. J. Hetherington (1989). Katharine Atholl, 1874-1960: Against the Tide. Publisher: Aberdeen University Press. ISBN 978-0-08-036592-3

Parliament of the United Kingdom
Preceded by James Gardiner	Member of Parliament for Kinross & West Perthshire; 1923 – 1938	Succeeded by William McNair Snadden
Military offices
Preceded by His Grace; 8th Duke of Atholl	Honorary Colonel of the Scottish Horse; May 1942–May 1952	Succeeded by Col. Robert Appleby Bartram
