= James Gardiner (British politician) =

British politician

James Gardiner (1860 – 31 December 1924) was a Scottish farmer and Liberal Party politician.

== Family and education ==
Gardiner was born near Crieff in Perthshire in 1860, the son of John Gardiner, a crofter, and his wife Harriet (née Allan). He was educated at Morrison's Academy in Crieff and also received private tuition. In 1887 he married Elizabeth Maude Christie the daughter of an engineer from Ruthvenvale, near Auchterarder. Elizabeth Gardiner died of heart failure in a London nursing home in 1921 and in 1922 Gardiner married Elizabeth Christie whose father had homes in Mokameh in Bengal and at Comrie.

== Career ==
Gardiner followed his father into agriculture. He built up a seed potato and grain merchant's business in Perth. He became a tenant farmer and developed one of the largest potato farms in Scotland, occupying an extensive portion of land on the Drummond Castle estate of the Earl of Ancaster. had a distinguished career in Scottish agriculture. He was sometime Director of the Scottish Chamber of Agriculture and President of Scottish National Farmers’ Union. During the Great War he served as a Member of the Ministry of Agriculture, Fisheries and Food, Potato Advisory Committee. He was also a Member of the Council of the National Institute of Agricultural Botany. He was an acknowledged expert in practical agriculture in all its advanced branches and was an authority on agricultural plant breeding, raising several of the most popular immune varieties of potatoes in cultivation. He later passed from specialising in potatoes to general farming and stock - breeding.

== Politics ==
Gardiner first stood for Parliament at the 1918 general election as Liberal candidate for Kinross and Western Perthshire. Kinross and Western Perthshire was a new seat created for the 1918 election. Gardiner's opponent was the Unionist Archibald Stirling who had represented one of the previous seats covering part of the same area, West Perthshire since winning a by-election there in February 1917. Despite Gardiner's support for Prime Minister David Lloyd George, it was Stirling who was awarded the Coalition coupon. However it was Gardiner who won the election, one of the few Liberals to be elected against the coupon, and he then loyally supported the Lloyd George coalition in Parliament. Gardiner defeated Stirling in a straight fight by a majority of 604 votes.

At the 1922 general election Gardiner stood as a supporter of Lloyd George under the description National Liberal and, despite the narrowness of his victory in 1918, he was returned unopposed. He stood down at the next election.

== Death ==
Gardiner died at his home, Dargill Farm, Crieff on 31 December 1924 aged 64 years.

Parliament of the United Kingdom
New constituency	Member of Parliament for Kinross and Western Perthshire; 1918 – 1923	Succeeded by The Duchess of Atholl
