= Julia Pirie =

British Cold War spy

Elizabeth Mary Julia Pirie
- Born: 8 July 1918
- Died: 2 September 2008 (aged 90)
- Other name: Julia Pirie
- Occupation: Spy
- Known for: Espionage

Elizabeth Mary Julia Pirie (8 July 1918 – 2 September 2008) is best known as a British spy who worked for MI5 from the 1950s through her retirement in the 1990s. She was known to her family as Elizabeth, but as Julia by her MI5 colleagues. She was initially recruited to spy on the Communist Party of Great Britain. The Communist Party's relevance had dwindled significantly by 1978 and she was withdrawn from her role there and assigned to other roles by MI5.

== Early years ==
Born in Harbury, Warwickshire on 8 July 1918, to Elizabeth Mary Pirie and Allen Grant Pirie, Julia Pirie was an only child. Her father was from Aberdeen, and an advocate by profession. He died in 1923, of wounds received while serving with the Royal Warwickshire Regiment in France during World War I, when Pirie was only five years old. Pirie's mother subsequently returned to her native Calcutta, now Kolkata, with her daughter. Pirie went to school at Loreto convent at Shillong, in rural Assam. She returned to Britain when the war broke out in 1939, specifically to join the War Effort and serve her country.

== War Effort ==
Pirie initially joined the Auxiliary Territorial Service, the women's section of the British army. In her first role, she drove ambulances and other vehicles stationed in Shrewsbury. After D Day, she volunteered to work in Europe and saw service in France and Germany. Pirie was with the first Allied soldiers going into the Nazi's Bergen-Belsen concentration camp, which had a profound effect on her. She was later posted with the British Army on the Rhine, after which she left the army.

== MI5 recruitment and inside the Communist Party ==
Julia Pirie next worked as personal secretary for the Duchess of Atholl. Chairman of the British League for European Freedom, the duchess was a fierce opponent of Soviet control in Europe. Pirie also joined the First Aid Nursing Yeomanry (FANY). During the war FANY had been a recruiting ground for the Special Operations Executive and MI5 also may have used them. In any case, Julia joined MI5 and infiltrated the Communist Party as a typist.

In Pirie's obituary in The Daily Telegraph, she is described as "a small, dumpy woman with the appearance of a confirmed and rather matronly spinster", whose "unassuming demeanour masked a sharp intellect and the powers of observation essential for the task of a secret agent." She worked her way into the inner circles of the party, eventually working directly under party secretary John Gollan. This put her in a position to pass information from Gollan's office to her MI5 handlers.

The Telegraph speculates that she may have been the inside agent who provided crucial information for two important MI5 operations described in Peter Wright's book Spycatcher.

Julia Pirie often travelled with John Gollan in trips to countries behind the Iron Curtain.

In 1978, Pirie retired from the Party. By this time it had been much weakened by Soviet invasions of Hungary in 1956 and Czechoslovakia in 1968. The Party paid her pension until her death.

== Later assignments and retirement ==
Although she had left the Communist Party, Pirie did not retire from MI5, and her next assignment was against the Provisional IRA. She travelled to various European countries playing the role of a tourist but in fact collecting information about them. On one occasion, still playing a tourist, she rented a flat in Barcelona, just below an IRA safe flat. When Spanish authorities became concerned about the wireless emissions of her equipment, they raided her flat. Although the authorities were satisfied, there was a risk of the IRA having noticed, and the operation was abandoned.

After retiring from active operations in the 1990s, she lectured to groups of MI5 trainees and to the police.
