= John Boyd Kinnear =

JBritish Lawyer and politician

John Boyd Kinnear (1828 – 10 November 1920) was a Scottish lawyer, writer and Liberal, later Liberal Unionist, politician.

== Biography ==
Kinnear was the son of Christian Boyd Greenshields and her husband, Charles Kinnear of Kinloch. He was educated at the University of Edinburgh and the University of St Andrews. He became a Scottish Advocate in 1850 and from 1852 to 1856 was political secretary to the Lord Advocate of Scotland James Moncreiff. In 1855 he was called to the bar at the Inner Temple and was a JP for Fife. He was an extensive writer on jurisprudence and other topics including religion and women's rights.

In the 1885 general election, he was elected Member of Parliament (MP) for East Fife. However, in 1886 he stood as a Liberal Unionist and was defeated by future prime minister H. H. Asquith.

He died at the age of 92.

== Family ==
Kinnear married Sarah Harriet Frith in 1852. She died in 1866 and he married Teresa Bassano of Venice in 1868.

His brother was the eminent architect Charles Kinnear of Peddie & Kinnear.

== Publications ==
- A comparison of the bankruptcy systems of England and Scotland W. Maxwell, 1858
- Suggestions relative to the improvement of Court of Session procedure Bell and Bradfute, 1863
- Digest of House of Lords cases decided on appeal from Scotland, 1709 to 1864 Bell & Bradfute, 1865
- The right of women to labour F. Bell, 1873
- Principles of property in land Smith, Elder, 1880
- Principles of Civil Government Smith, Elder & Co., 1887
- The education of women Women's Emancipation Union, 1892
- The foundations of religion Smith, Elder & Co., 1905
- "Principles of Property" Smith, Elder & Co., 1914

Parliament of the United Kingdom
| New constituency (see Fife constituency) | Member of Parliament for East Fife; 1885 – 1886 | Succeeded by H. H. Asquith |
