= James Gilmour (Miramichi lumber baron) =

James Gilmour (14 October 1782 - 29 January 1858) was a prominent Scottish-born entrepreneur, farmer, school trustee, justice of the peace, militia officer, and co-founder of both Douglastown, New Brunswick, and Gilmour, Rankin & Co.

Born in 1782, James Gilmour was the brother of Allan Gilmour, Sr, and the son of Allan Gilmour and Elizabeth Pollok. He was sent in 1812 (together with Alexander Rankin) to establish a base on the Miramichi River (New Brunswick, Canada) for the family's Glasgow-based firm, Pollok, Gilmour and Company. Together, James Gilmour and Alexander Rankin, founded the small community of Gretna Green (later Douglastown, New Brunswick), and established a new branch for the firm, Gilmour, Rankin & Co.

Gilmour and Rankin first developed a sawmill, offices and a house at Douglastown, New Brunswick, and later established a shipbuilding yard and a second sawmill. They were one of the largest and most influential employers in the region, highly successful as timber merchants and ship builders.

James Gilmour returned to Scotland in 1840, and died at Eaglesham, Renfrewshire in 1858.

== Bibliography ==
- John Rankin, A history of our firm: being some account of the firm of Pollok, Gilmour and Co. and its offshoots and connections, 1804-1920, publ. 1921.
