= Sir John Gilmour, 3rd Baronet =

British politician (1912–2007)

Member of Parliament for East Fife
- In office 9 November 1961 – 7 April 1979
- Preceded by: James Henderson-Stewart
- Succeeded by: Barry Henderson

Personal details
- Born: John Edward Gilmour; 24 October 1912 Glasgow, Scotland
- Died: 1 June 2007 (aged 94) Cupar, Scotland
- Party: Conservative
- Other political affiliations: Unionist (pre-1965)
- Children: Sir John Gilmour, 4th Baronet
- Parent: John Gilmour, 2nd Baronet
- Relatives: Sir John Gilmour, 1st Baronet, grandfather
- Education: Eton College
- Alma mater: Trinity Hall, Cambridge
- Predecessor: John Gilmour, 2nd Baronet
- Successor: Sir John Gilmour, 4th Baronet

Colonel Sir John Edward Gilmour, 3rd Baronet, DSO, TD, DL (24 October 1912 – 1 June 2007) was a British Conservative Party politician. He was Member of Parliament for East Fife for 18 years, from 1961 to 1979. He was also a soldier, farmer and landowner, and a company director and building society vice-president.

== Biography ==
Gilmour was born in Glasgow. His mother died when he was seven. His grandfather, Sir John Gilmour, 1st Baronet was chairman of the (Scottish) Unionist party, and was created a baronet in 1897. His father, Colonel Sir John Gilmour, 2nd Baronet, DSO, was an MP for 30 years, serving in several ministerial positions, including Secretary of State for Scotland and Home Secretary. His father died in office in 1940, while serving as Minister of Shipping, and Gilmour succeeded him as baronet.

Gilmour was educated at Eton College, where he was captain of boats. He read law at Trinity Hall, Cambridge, and rowed for Cambridge University in the 1933 Boat Race; he missed out the following year due to a bout of appendicitis shortly before the race. He also studied at Dundee School of Economics. After completing his studies, he helped to run the family estate at Montrave, near Leven, Fife from 1934.

Gilmour joined the 2nd Fife and Forfar Yeomanry in 1939, part of the Royal Armoured Corps. He served in Fife and then Northern Ireland, before landing in Normandy in June 1944 shortly after D-Day. As a major, he led a squadron of tanks that was in the thick of the fighting in Operation Goodwood, as one of the leading units of the 11th Armoured Division in its attack on Bourguebus Ridge. Three tanks were destroyed under him, and he ended up commanding the regiment from a bulldozer. He was awarded the DSO for his actions in Normandy and the subsequent advance to Antwerp. He was returned home after being wounded near Belsen, and went on to command the regiment when it was reconstituted as a Territorial Army unit in 1947. He retired from the Army in 1950. He remained involved with the Territorial Army, becoming Honorary Colonel of the Highland Yeomanry in 1971. He was later as one of the four Captains of the Royal Company of Archers.

Gilmour contested Clackmannan and Eastern Stirlingshire in the 1945 general election, losing to the incumbent MP, Arthur Woodburn. He served as a councillor on Fife County Council from 1955 to 1961. He won the by-election in 1961 for East Fife following the death of Sir James Henderson-Stewart, defeating John Smith while the future leader of the Labour Party was a law student at Glasgow University. He was dubbed "Sir John Sugar-Beet" during the campaign; he took the intended insult as a compliment, noting that the sugar beet grown on his estate and processed at a local mill supported many jobs in the constituency. He was chairman of the Scottish Unionist Party from 1965 to 1967, having been vice-chairman from 1963. He held the seat until the 1979 general election, when he stood down and was succeeded by Barry Henderson.

He was joint Master of the Fife Hunt from 1953 to 1972. He was a deputy lieutenant of Fife from 1953, and Lord Lieutenant of Fife from 1980 to 1987. He was also Lord High Commissioner to the General Assembly of the Church of Scotland in 1982 and 1983 (a post that his father had held in 1938 and 1939).

He married Ursula Wills in 1941. They had two sons together. His wife died in 2004.

He died in Cupar, in his former constituency, in June 2007.

== Legacy ==
His elder son John, born 1944, succeeded him in the baronetcy.

Parliament of the United Kingdom
Preceded by James Henderson-Stewart	Member of Parliament for East Fife; 1961–1979	Succeeded by Barry Henderson
Church of Scotland titles
Preceded by Andrew Bruce	Lord High Commissioner; 1982–1983	Succeeded by Charles Maclean
Honorary titles
Preceded by The Lord Kilmany	Lord Lieutenant of Fife; 1980–1987	Succeeded by The Earl of Elgin
Baronetage of the United Kingdom
Preceded by John Gilmour	Baronet (of Lundin); 1940–2007	Succeeded by John Gilmour
