= Willis Pickard =

British newspaper editor

Dr Willis Pickard was editor of the Times Educational Supplement Scotland for twenty two years until he retired in 2001. The University of Edinburgh recognised his contribution by awarding an honorary degree in 2002.

Willis Pickard was features editor of The Scotsman. Whilst TES Scotland Editor, he was also a broadcasting commentator on the educational scene and pursued a wide range of public commitments. His appointments include member of the Scottish Arts Council from 1982 to 1988 and of its Literature Committee, chairman of Book Trust Scotland, member of the Board of Scotland in Europe and Chair of Theatre Objektiv, a drama company. He was Rector of Aberdeen University from 1988 to 1990. He works for the BBC on the appointments committee to the Broadcasting Council for Scotland, and in 2005, was appointed Trustee of the National Library of Scotland.

With John Dobie, he has written The Political Context of Education after Devolution. A lifelong member of the Scottish Liberal Democrats, Pickard stood in two general elections as a candidate for North East Fife.

Academic offices
Preceded by Hamish Watt	Rector of the University of Aberdeen; 1988–1990	Succeeded by Colin Bell
