= 1938 Kinross and Western Perthshire by-election =

UK Parliamentary by-election

- 21 December 1938

Constituency of Kinross and Western Perthshire
- Turnout: 66.6% (▼6.7%)
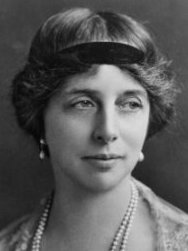
	First party	Second party
	UP
Candidate	William McNair Snadden	Duchess of Atholl
Party	Unionist	Independent
Popular vote	11,808	10,495
Percentage	52.94%	47.06%
Swing	▼8.3%	N/A
MP before election
Duchess of Atholl
Unionist
Subsequent MP
William McNair Snadden
Unionist

The 1938 Kinross and Western Perthshire by-election was held on 21 December 1938. The by-election was held due to the resignation of the incumbent Unionist member of parliament Katharine Stewart-Murray, Duchess of Atholl, who resigned the Conservative and Unionist whip at Westminster as a protest against the National government led by Neville Chamberlain and his European policy of appeasement of the fascist dictators Hitler and Mussolini, seeking re-election as an independent. However, the seat was regained for the Unionists by William McNair Snadden.

== Result ==
Kinross and Western Perthshire by-election, 1938
Party	Candidate	Votes	%	±%
Unionist	William McNair Snadden	11,808	52.94	−8.3
Independent	Duchess of Atholl	10,495	47.06	N/A
Majority		1,313	5.88	−14.5
Turnout		22,303	66.6	−6.7
Unionist hold		Swing		

== See also ==
- 1963 Kinross and Western Perthshire by-election
- Ball, Stuart, ‘The politics of appeasement: the fall of the Duchess of Atholl and the Kinross and West Perth by-election, December 1938’, Scottish Historical Review, vol. 69, no. 1 (1990), pp. 49-83.
- Hetherington, Sheila, Katharine Atholl 1874-1960: Against the Tide (Aberdeen University Press, 1989)
