= Gamble baronets =

Baronetcy in the Baronetage of the United Kingdom

Escutcheon of the Gamble baronets of Windlehurst

The Gamble baronetcy, of Windlehurst in the parish of St Helens in the County Palatine of Lancaster, is a title in the Baronetage of the United Kingdom. It was created on 31 August 1897 for David Gamble. He was a chemical manufacturer, Mayor of St Helens from 1868 to 1870, 1882 to 1883 and 1886 to 1887 and a pioneer of the Volunteer Movement.

The 2nd Baronet was Mayor of St Helens from 1888 to 1889. The 3rd Baronet was Mayor of St Helens from 1913 to 1915.

== Gamble baronets, of Windlehurst (1897) ==
- Sir David Gamble, 1st Baronet (1823–1907)
- Sir Josias Christopher Gamble, 2nd Baronet (1848–1908))
- Sir David Gamble, 3rd Baronet (1876–1943))
- Sir David Arthur Josias Gamble, 4th Baronet (1907–1982))
- Sir David Gamble, 5th Baronet (1933–1984)
- Sir David Hugh Norman Gamble, 6th Baronet (born 1966)

The heir presumptive is Hugh Robert George Gamble (born 1946), a kinsman of the present holder.

== Notes ==
Baronetage of the United Kingdom
Preceded by Maple baronets	Gamble baronets of Windlehurst; 31 August 1897	Succeeded by Gilmour baronets
