= Sir John Gilmour, 4th Baronet =

British military officer

Sir John Gilmour, 4th Baronet DL (15 July 1944 – 10 February 2013) was a British military officer who served in the Fife and Forfar Yeomanry/Scottish Horse. He was the son of Sir John Edward Gilmour of Lundin and Montrave, 3rd Bt. and Ursula Mabyn Wills.

== Education ==
Gilmour was educated at Eton College in Berkshire and the North of Scotland College of Agriculture. He was admitted to the Royal Company of Archers.

== Family and public life ==
Gilmour married Valerie Jardine Russell, daughter of George Walker Russell, on 6 May 1967. They lived at Wester Balcormo, Fife. His maternal grandfather was Frank Oliver Wills the High Sheriff of Bristol, whose father was Sir Frank William Wills, the Bristol architect & Lord Mayor of Bristol, who was a member of the Wills tobacco family – WD & HO Wills. Also his 3rd great-grandfather was Seth Smith (property developer) who developed large parts of the West End of London, including Belgravia & Mayfair, in the early 1800s.

== Yeomanry career ==
Commissioned on 26 May 1966 as a second lieutenant into the Fife and Forfar Yeomanry/Scottish Horse, Gilmour became the fourth generation of his family to serve in this regiment.

Rising to captain, having seen the regiment turned into a cadre with its armoured vehicles removed and its pay stopped. This continued until he finished his service as a captain when his regiment was put into suspended animation. In 1992 his regiment were reactivated, and in 1999 he gained the rank of honorary colonel.

== Civil appointments ==
Gilmour held the office of deputy lieutenant of Fife from 1988.

Baronetage of the United Kingdom
| Preceded by John Gilmour | Baronet (of Lundin); 2007–2013 | Succeeded by Nicholas Gilmour |
