= 1963 Kinross and Western Perthshire by-election =

1963 UK Parliamentary by-election

- 7 November 1963

The Kinross and Western Perthshire seat in the House of Commons Elected by simple majority using first past the post Triggered by death of incumbent
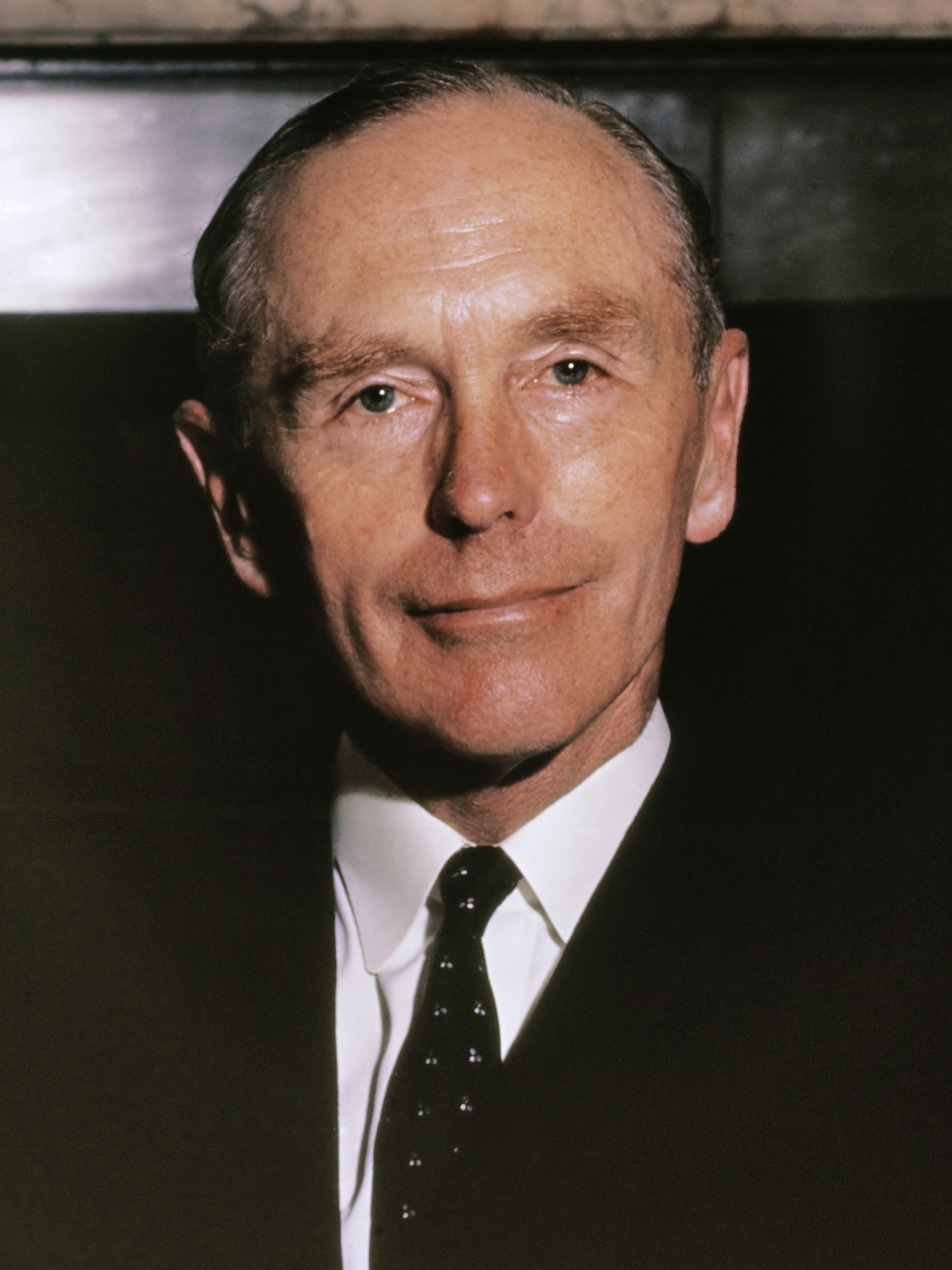

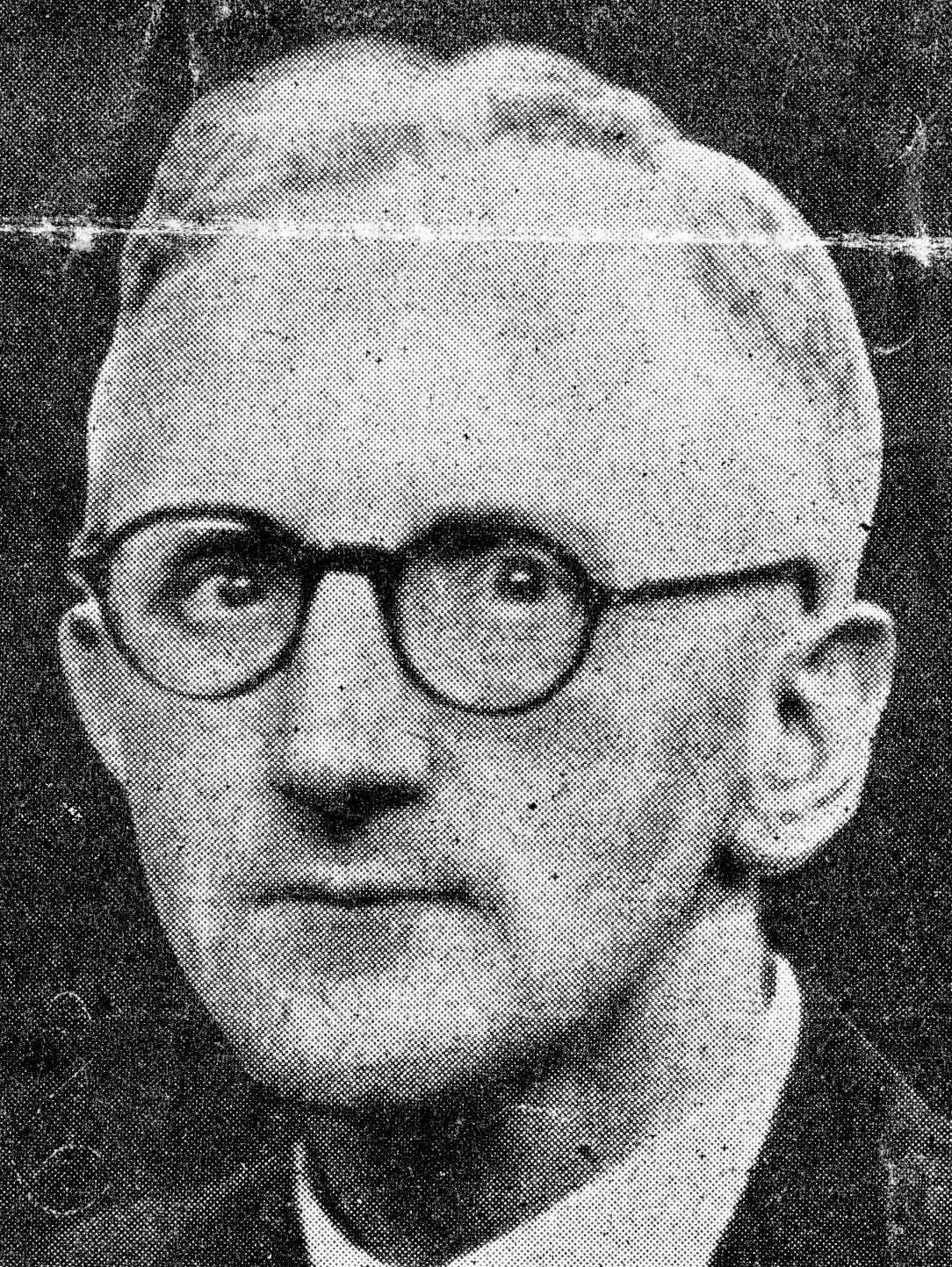
	First party	Second party
		Lib
Candidate	Alec Douglas-Home	Alistair Duncan Millar
Party	Unionist	Liberal
Popular vote	14,147	4,819
Percentage	57.4%	19.5%
Swing	▼10.8%	New
	Third party	Fourth party
	Lab
Candidate	Andrew Forrester	Arthur Donaldson
Party	Labour	SNP
Popular vote	3,752	1,801
Percentage	15.2%	7.3%
Swing	▼1.6%	▼7.7%
MP before election
Gilmour Leburn
Unionist
Subsequent MP
Alec Douglas-Home
Unionist

The 1963 Kinross and Western Perthshire by-election of 7 November 1963 was a by-election to the UK House of Commons. It was unique among by-elections since 1918 in that one of the candidates was the sitting prime minister, Alec Douglas-Home; he was nominated for the constituency after disclaiming a peerage, as he felt he needed to be a member of the Commons rather than the House of Lords during his premiership. Douglas-Home won the election.

== Candidates ==
The by-election was caused when Scottish Office Minister Gilmour Leburn died while on holiday on 15 August 1963. The constituency of Kinross and West Perthshire, a large rural area at the southern end of the Scottish Highlands, was the safest Conservative seat in Scotland (majority 12,248 in 1959) and a plum seat for any Conservative candidate.

On 11 September, the Executive of Kinross and West Perthshire Unionist Association selected Hon. George Younger, a 31-year-old heir of the Scottish aristocracy who was looking to make a start in national politics. On 11 October the required notice was given to the Speaker of the vacancy (the House being in recess) so that the writ for a new election would be issued. On 17 October the full membership of the Unionist Association adopted Younger as its candidate.

However, the emergence of Alec Douglas-Home as the new Leader of the Conservative Party and his appointment as prime minister on 19 October led to a sudden requirement to find him a seat in the House of Commons. Douglas-Home's Scottish ancestry made him look with particular interest at Kinross and West Perthshire; speculation earlier in the week had already linked him with it. On Sunday 20 October, Younger announced his offer to withdraw in favour of Home, an offer which was graciously accepted. Younger was later selected for Ayr, which he represented from 1964 to 1992. On 23 October, Home executed an instrument of disclaimer under the Peerage Act 1963, becoming Sir Alec Douglas-Home. The new session of Parliament was delayed to await the outcome of the by-election.

The Labour Party chose Andrew Forrester, a 25-year-old schoolteacher from Glasgow who was Chairman of Scotstoun Young Socialists. The Liberal Party nominated Alistair Duncan Millar, a son of James Duncan Millar who farmed in Perthshire. The Scottish National Party leader Arthur Donaldson, a 62-year-old journalist who had fought Dundee in the 1945 general election, was also nominated.

With a sitting prime minister fighting a by-election, interest was high and three additional candidates stood. Willie Rushton, the satirist and broadcaster, was put up as an independent candidate by Private Eye magazine. Ian Smith, a 43-year-old former Wing Commander in the Royal Air Force and now garage owner of Callander, stood as an Independent Unionist. A last-minute candidate was Richard Wort, a schoolmaster from Wimbledon who stood as an independent right-wing candidate; his nomination paper was handed in with 29 minutes to spare.

On the eve of poll, Willie Rushton announced that he was retiring from the contest, and endorsed Liberal Party candidate Alistair Duncan Millar, who he thought stood the best chance of defeating Douglas-Home.

== Result ==
The result was declared from the County Buildings in Perth, shortly after noon on Friday 8 November. Douglas-Home won with a majority of 9,328, and all but he and the Labour and Liberal candidates forfeited their deposits. He went on to represent the constituency until the October 1974 general election.

By-election 1963: Kinross and Western Perthshire
Party	Candidate	Votes	%	±%
Unionist	Alec Douglas-Home	14,147	57.4	−10.8
Liberal	Alistair Duncan Millar	4,819	19.5	New
Labour	Andrew Forrester	3,752	15.2	−1.6
SNP	Arthur Donaldson	1,801	7.3	−7.7
Ind. Unionist	Ian Smith	78	0.3	New
Independent	Willie Rushton	45	0.2	New
Ind. Conservative	Richard Wort	23	0.1	New
Majority		9,328	37.9	−13.5
Turnout		24,665	76.1	+5.1
Unionist hold		Swing		

== See also ==
- 1938 Kinross and Western Perthshire by-election
- 2026 Makerfield by-election
- List of United Kingdom by-elections (1950–1979)

== Bibliography ==
- Times Guide to the House of Commons, London: Times Books, 1964
