= Alexander Rankin =

Canadian politician

Alexander Rankin (December 31, 1788 – April 3, 1852) was a Scottish-born merchant and political figure in New Brunswick. He represented Northumberland County in the Legislative Assembly of New Brunswick from 1827 to 1852.

== Early life ==
He was born and educated in Mearns parish, the brother of Robert Rankin, and son of James Rankin and Helen Ferguson. His uncles, John Pollok and Arthur Pollok, were cofounders of Pollok, Gilmour and Company.

== Career ==
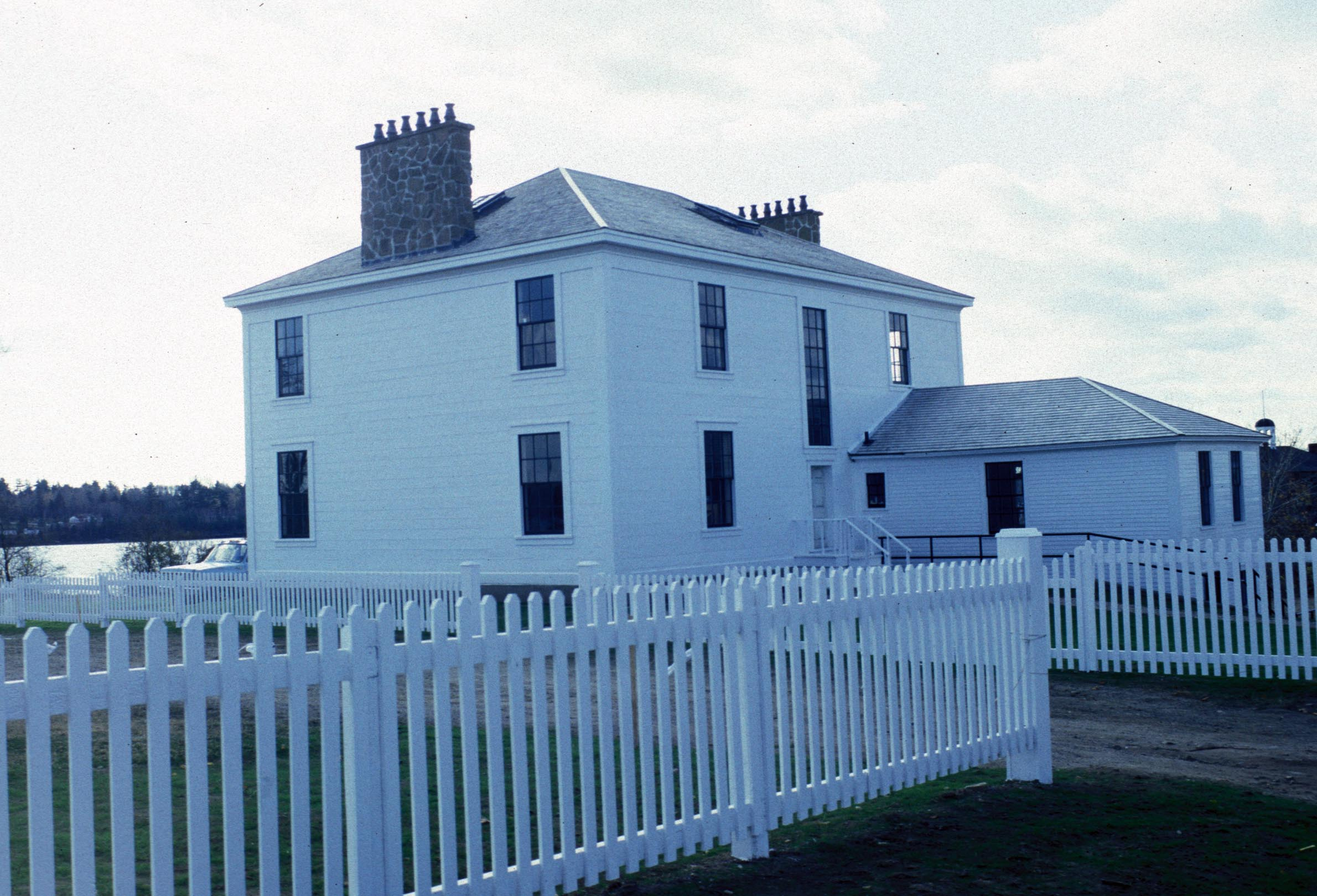
Rankin House - former home of Miramichi lumber baron Alexander Rankin at Douglastown, Miramichi, New Brunswick (IR Walker 1983)

At the age of 18, he was hired as a clerk by Pollok, Gilmour and Company, a Glasgow firm that dealt in timber, and was sent with James Gilmour to New Brunswick to establish a branch of the firm (Gilmour, Rankin and Company) on the Miramichi River. They established a small community called Gretna Green (later Douglastown) as well as stores, wharves and a sawmill. Besides exporting timber, they also sold goods supplied from Scotland. In 1825, the operation suffered extensive damage in the Miramichi Fire. However, they were able to rebuild quickly with the help of the parent company. Rankin also became involved in timber operations at Bathurst (Ferguson, Rankin and Company), Dalhousie and Campbellton (Arthur Ritchie and Company).

In politics as well as in his timber operations, Rankin frequently found himself competing with Joseph Cunard. In elections in 1837 and 1843, Rankin supported John Ambrose Street against candidates supported by Cunard. Gilmour retired from the business in 1842, selling his interest to Rankin. Rankin was named to the province's Executive Council in 1847. With Cunard, he was a commissioner for lights in the Gulf of Saint Lawrence and served on the board of health for the region. For many years, he also served as justice of the peace.

Rankin died unexpectedly in Liverpool during a visit to England at the age of 63.

== Bibliography ==
- John Rankin, A history of our firm: being some account of the firm of Pollok, Gilmour and Co. and its offshoots and connections, 1804-1920, publ. 1921]
