= David Gamble (photographer) =

British-American photographer and artist (born 1953)

David Martin Gamble
- Born: March 1953 (age 73); England
- Occupations: Photographer, artist
- Years active: 1970s–present
- Notable work: Perfidious Man "Andy Warhol's House"

David Martin Gamble is a British-American photographer and artist known for his portrait and journalistic photography.

Six of his portraits, including one of Stephen Hawking, are held by the National Portrait Gallery in London, England. A portrait of Neil deGrasse Tyson by Gamble is held in the collections of the Smithsonian's National Portrait Gallery in Washington, D.C.

== Early life and education ==
Gamble was born in March 1953. In his youth, he was a member of a number of bands in the Cambridge rock scene in the 1970s, including the Inserts, Truth and Rory. He graduated from Ealing School of Art in London, England. After which, he did his postgraduate studies at the Association of Photographers. In 1986, Gamble was an assistant to Neal Slavin during the publication of Slavin's book of photography Britons. For a short period later in 1992, he would serve as a director of the association.

== Career ==
Soon after the death of Andy Warhol, Gamble was permitted access to the artist's East 66th Street, Manhattan, apartment to photograph his art work, furniture and myriad of personal effects. The project was commissioned by Sotheby's as part of the publicity for their auction of Warhol's property. A decade later in January 1998, Gamble exhibited a collection of the photographs, taken over a period of eight days, at the Groucho Club in London. Images of Warhol were digitally superimposed on several of the photographs, creating the feeling that to Paul Vallely of The Independent seemed as though "the dead man [haunted] the photographs of his living spaces."

A notable example in this collection of photographs is a look inside Warhol's medicine cabinet in his private bathroom containing his varies prescription medication and personal hygiene products. This collection of prints has toured several locations, being exhibited at several galleries in the United States. The photograph of his medicine cabinet was also included in "Regarding Warhol: Sixty Artists, Fifty Years", an exhibit by Metropolitan Museum of Art that was also presented at The Andy Warhol Museum.

In 1987, Gamble was awarded the inaugural Kodak European Award which is given to professional photographers under 35-years-old.

In 1988, Gamble photographed Stephen Hawking in a portrait commissioned by Time magazine. The photograph was the winner of the second prize in the Science & Technology category of the World Press Photo of the Year award. A copy of the Hawking photograph is currently held in the collections of the National Portrait Gallery in London, England. Other portraits held by the gallery include those of Quentin Crisp, David Lean, Will Self, Alan Sugar and Elisabeth Welch. As a photojournalist, Gamble has worked for Life, Observer, The New Yorker, and Time magazines. His photographs of Dublin, Ireland were also included in and were on the cover of the Observer Magazine's "Irish Issue" of 30 October 1988.

In 2000, Gamble published a photo-book with Will Self entitled Perfidious Man. The book includes several photographs by Gamble accompanied by essays written by Self. The main subject of the photographs and essays is a look into the contemporary concept of masculinity.

Gamble moved to the United States in 2000, establishing his residence in The Hamptons. Paintings he created during this period were later exhibited at the New Century Artists Gallery in Manhattan. His artwork then went on to be represented in New York by the George Bergès Gallery where in 2022 he exhibited the photographs he was hired to take of the ephemera in the final residence of Andy Warhol after the pop artist died in the hospital.

Gamble and Eric Ernst formed the Artists Secret Society. The society attempts to circumvent the traditional galleries in the Hamptons area. ASS opened an exhibit in July 2008 to promote "successful and lesser known" artists in the area. Ernst and Gamble also host an interview segment on Plum TV's "Morning Noon and Night" show. In 2009, some of Gamble's work was added to the collections of the Guild Hall Museum in East Hampton, New York. At the museums "ac.qui.si.tions" exhibit in November 2009, Gamble was on-hand to present and discuss his work with visitors.

According to Neil deGrasse Tyson, Gamble and Helen Matsos were the other two co-creators of the scientific talk show StarTalk. A portrait of Tyson taken by Gamble in 2010 is held the collections of the National Portrait Gallery in Washington, D.C.

Gamble recently collaborated with the New Orleans choreographer Maya Taylor on a work named "The Silence Project".
