= 1825 Miramichi fire =

Forest fire in New Brunswick, Canada

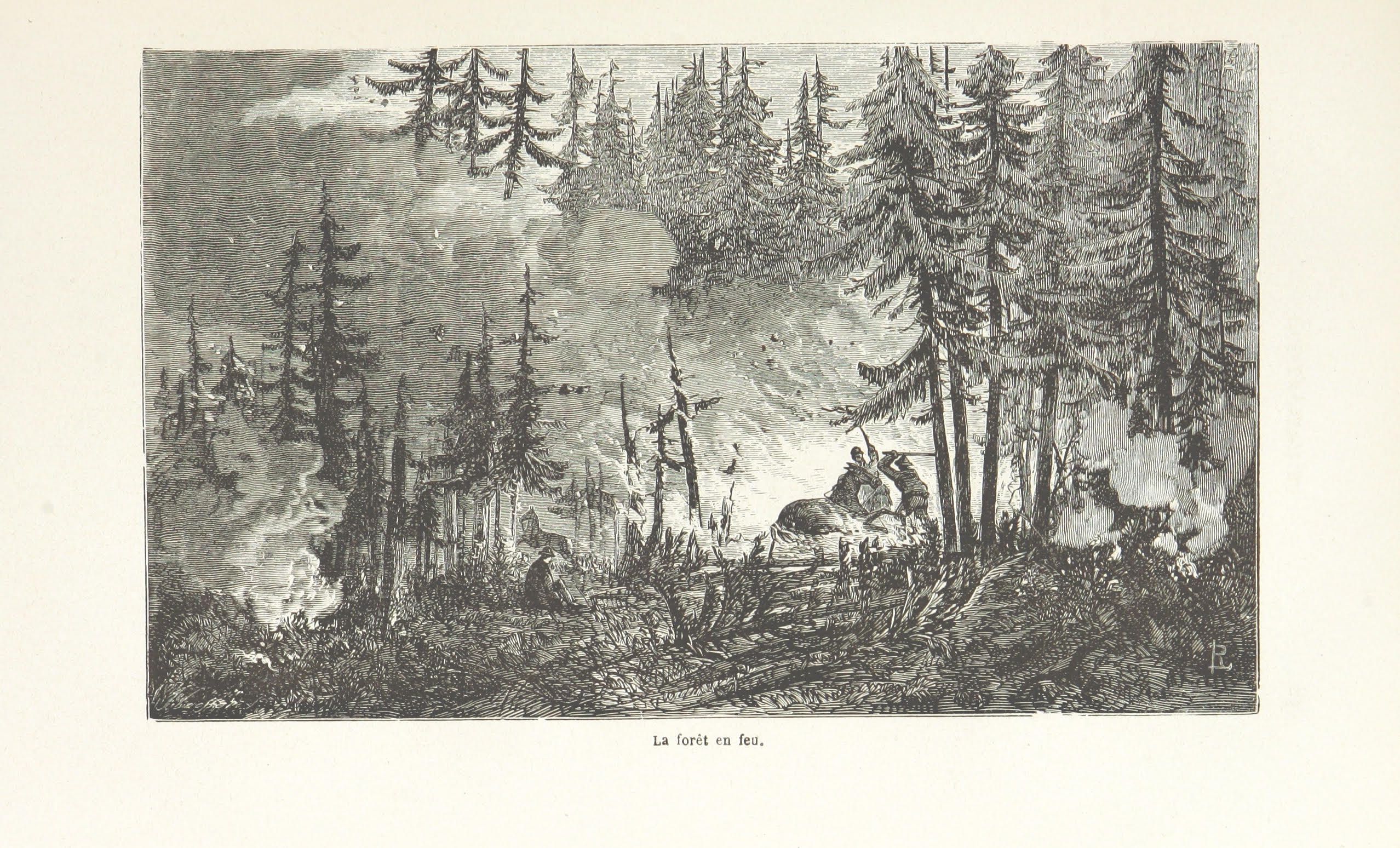
- Artistic depiction of the 1825 Miramichi wildfire
- Date: October 7, 1825
- Location: Northern New Brunswick, Canada
- Coordinates: 47°00′00″N 65°34′00″W

Statistics
- Burned area: 3,950,000 acres (16,000 km^{2}; 6,170 sq mi)

Impacts
- Deaths: 160

Ignition
- Cause: Unusually hot weather in the summer and fall of 1825, along with outdoor fires by loggers

Map
- Approximate location of the 1825 Miramichi Fire

The 1825 Miramichi Fire, or Great Miramichi Fire, or Great Fire of Miramichi, as it came to be known, was a massive forest fire complex that devastated forests and communities throughout much of northern New Brunswick, Canada, in October 1825. It ranks among the three largest forest fires ever recorded in North America.

== History ==
About 1/3 of the homes in Fredericton were destroyed, but the main devastation was 100 miles (160 km) to the northeast commencing from Bas Caraquet. The preceding summer was a particularity hot one, with bush fires common. On the evening of October 7, 1825, the firestorm roared through Newcastle, New Brunswick (now part of the City of Miramichi), and in less than 3 hours reduced the town of 1,000 people to ruins – of 260 original buildings, only 12 remained. Only 6 of 70 buildings survived in the adjacent village of Douglastown. The fire similarly destroyed other communities, including Moorefield, Napan, and Black River Bridge. Chatham, Nelson, and Doaktown escaped the fire. The cause of the blaze is not known, but it was likely human-caused.

About 160 people died in and around Newcastle, including prisoners in the Newcastle Jail. Elsewhere, the totals were likely higher, given the number of lumbermen in the forests at the time (about 3,000). To escape the blaze many residents took refuge with livestock and wildlife in the Miramichi River.

In total the fire(s) consumed almost 16,000 km^{2} (about 1/5 of New Brunswick's forests or 3.95 million acres). The blaze has been partly attributed to unusually hot weather in the summer and fall of 1825, coupled with outdoor fires by settlers and loggers.

The communities were soon rebuilt, but many of those affected moved to communities bordering the Bay of Chaleur, including Campbellton, Dalhousie, Belledune, and the southern Gaspé coast. It is also probable that some of the displaced persons established a community in the Ottawa Valley formerly known as Miramichi, now known as Pembroke, Ontario. Although the lumber industry recovered, the fire is considered responsible for the end of the mast-making industry on the Miramichi River.

== In the media ==
The event is commemorated in the 1959 Folkways Records recording of Miramichi Fire, a traditional folk song included on the album Folksongs of Maine by Sandy Ives. The fire is also the plot of Valerie Sherrard's first historical novel Three Million Acres of Flame (2007). The fire is also referred to in the 2016 novel Barkskins by Annie Proulx.

== See also ==
- List of fires in Canada
- List of disasters in Canada
