= Robert Rankin (timber merchant) =

Robert Rankin (31 May 1801 - 3 June 1870), the son of James Rankin and Helen Ferguson, and brother to Alexander Rankin, was a Scottish timber merchant and shipowner. His uncles, John Pollok and Arthur Pollok, were co-founders of Pollok, Gilmour and Company.

== Early life ==
Rankin was born at Mearns, Renfrewshire, Scotland. Having obtained a good general education in Scotland, he joined Pollok, Gilmour and Company in 1815, and in 1818 was transferred to Miramichi, New Brunswick.

== Career ==
In 1822 he set up a branch firm, Robert Rankin and Company, in Saint John, New Brunswick. This branch became the most prosperous and successful of the Pollok, Gilmour, and Company enterprises.

By 1830 Rankin was Saint John's leading shipowner and timber merchant. Rankin had added there to his lumbering concerns the building of ships and the importing of textiles, foodstuffs, and building supplies on a large scale – reputedly for more than half of the numerous merchants in the town.

In 1838 he returned to Scotland in order to lead the reorganisation of Pollok, Gilmour, and Company, whose founders had fallen out. He renamed it Rankin, Gilmour, and Company, and moved the headquarters to Liverpool. By 1838 his firm operated 130 vessels in the timber trade – making it the largest British shipowning firm – and employed no fewer than 15,000 men in its sawmills, on its wharves, and in the forests; it owned as well 2,000 horses and oxen for draught purposes. In the early 1830s the firm shipped out annually over 300 cargoes of timber. In order to employ its large fleet fully in the winter months, branch houses were opened in New Orleans, and Mobile, Alabama, where the company entered the rapidly expanding and very profitable cotton trade. Rankin's prestige in Liverpool can be judged by his election in January 1862 as chairman of the Mersey Docks and Harbour Board, described as “the highest honour Liverpool has to bestow.” He maintained control of this business empire until his death at the age of 69.

In his later years Rankin’s public benefactions were numerous. He funded mechanics’ institutes, temperance societies, and orphans’ homes, and he contributed several large sums for the laying of the first Transatlantic telegraph cable in the 1850s and 1860s.

== Personal life ==
On 17 March 1829 he married Ann, daughter of John Strang, a prominent Scottish merchant of St. Andrews, New Brunswick.

Early in 1869 his health began to fail. The death of his daughter, drowned in Menai Strait, Wales, in August 1869, was a crushing blow to Rankin, who had already lost four of his seven children through childhood illnesses. In 1865 he had established his son, James, as a country gentleman, buying for him two large estates in Herefordshire. James was later created 1st Rankin baronets, of Bryngwyn in 1898.

Rankin died in June 1870 at Bromborough Hall, Cheshire, England.

== Appraisal ==
According to his biographer David S. MacMillan, Rankin contributed greatly to the amazing growth of the shipbuilding and timber trades in 19th century Canada.

== Bibliography ==
- Rankin, John (1921). A history of our firm: being some account of the firm of Pollok, Gilmour and Co. and its offshoots and connections, 1804-1920. Liverpool, UK: Henry Young & Sons.
