= Sir John Gilmour, 2nd Baronet =

British politician (1876–1940)

Lieutenant Colonel The Right Honourable Sir John Gilmour Bt GCVO DSO* TD PC JP DL MP
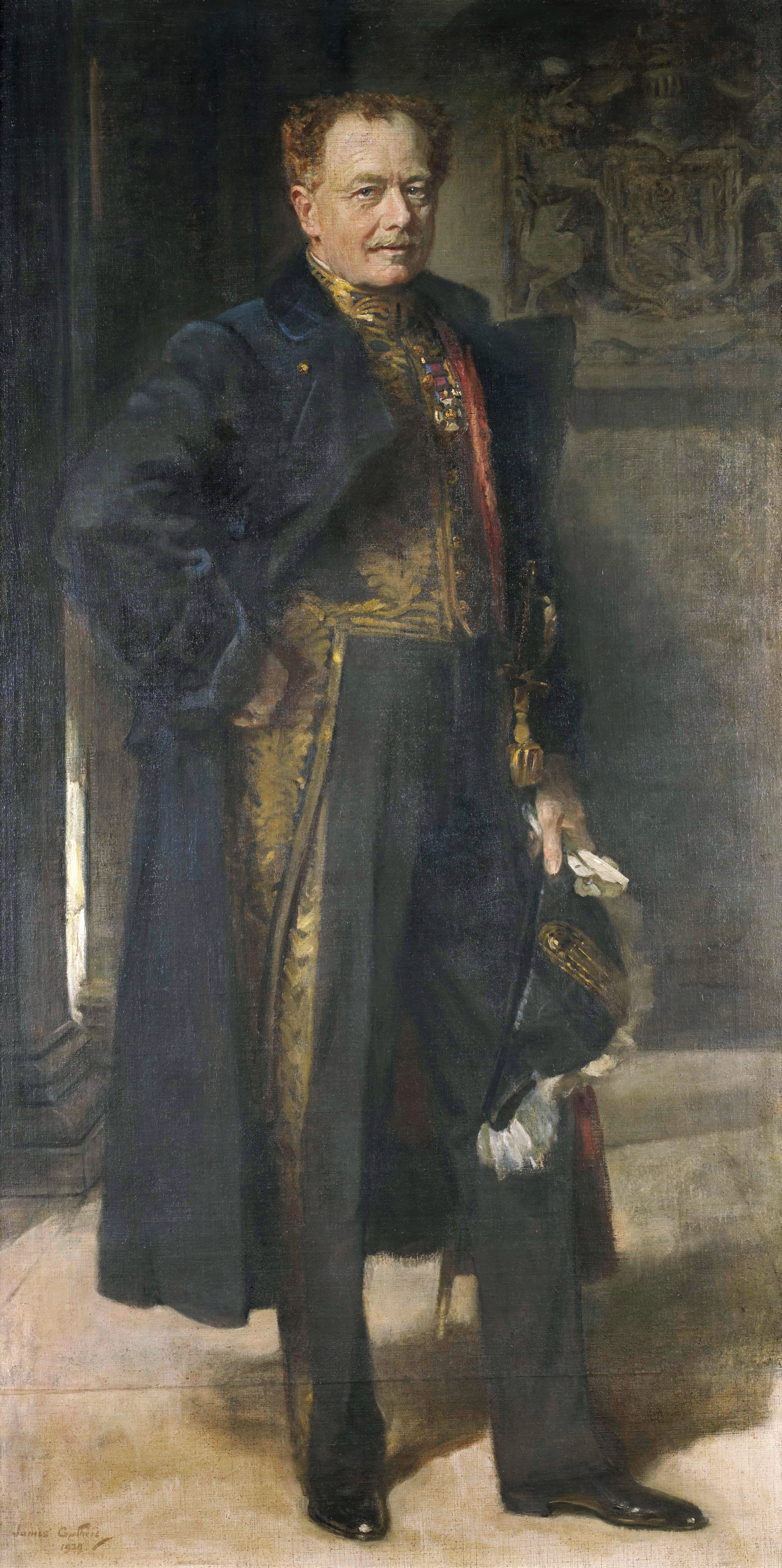

Home Secretary
- In office 1 October 1932 – 7 June 1935
- Prime Minister: Ramsay MacDonald
- Preceded by: Sir Herbert Samuel
- Succeeded by: Sir John Simon

Personal details
- Born: 27 May 1876 Montrave, Fife, Scotland
- Died: 30 March 1940 (aged 63) London, England
- Party: Unionist
- Spouse(s): Mary Louise Lambert; Violet Agnes Lambert; Lady Mary Cecilia Hamilton
- Education: University of Edinburgh; Trinity Hall, Cambridge

Lieutenant-Colonel Sir John Gilmour, 2nd Baronet GCVO DSO* TD PC JP DL MP (27 May 1876 – 30 March 1940) was a Scottish Unionist politician. He notably served as Home Secretary from 1932 to 1935.

== Early life ==
Gilmour was the son of Sir John Gilmour, 1st Baronet, chairman of the Scottish Conservative and Unionist party, who was created a baronet in 1897. His mother was Henrietta, daughter of David Gilmour of Quebec. He was educated at Trinity College, Glenalmond, the University of Edinburgh and Trinity Hall, Cambridge.

== Military service ==
Gilmour was a lieutenant in the Fifeshire Volunteer Light Horse, and was among the officers of the Fife and Forfar volunteer battalions to volunteer for service in the Second Boer War. He was commissioned a lieutenant in the Imperial Yeomanry on 7 February 1900, and served in South Africa with the 20th (Fife and Forfarshire Light Horse) Company of the 6th Battalion. He left Liverpool for South Africa with the company on the SS Cymric in March 1900. For his service, he was awarded the Queen's medal with 4 clasps and was twice mentioned in despatches (by Lord Roberts dated 4 September 1901 and in the final despatch by Lord Kitchener dated 23 June 1902). His letters from the Boer War were published in 1996 under the title "Clearly My Duty" by his son, Sir John Gilmour, 3rd Baronet. He again served in World War I with the Fife and Forfar Yeomanry, where he was again mentioned in despatches and awarded the DSO with bar. His service after the war saw him rise to the rank of Lieutenant-Colonel when he commanded the Fife and Forfar Yeomanry. On 8 May 1931 he was made the Honorary Colonel of the Fife and Forfar Yeomanry.

== Political career ==
He unsuccessfully contested East Fife in 1906 and was elected as Member of Parliament (MP) for East Renfrewshire from 1910 to 1918 and for Glasgow Pollok from 1918 until 1940. He was a Junior Lord of the Treasury in 1921–1922, Scottish Unionist Whip from 1919 to 1922 and in 1924.

He was appointed as Secretary for Scotland in 1924, and became the first Secretary of State for Scotland when the post was upgraded in 1926. A member of the Orange Order joining the Pollokshaws Lodge, LOL172, in June 1910. This Lodge is now named after him. Gilmour, as Secretary for Scotland, repudiated the Church of Scotland's report, "The Menace of the Irish Race to our Scottish Nationality".

Later in his career he served as Minister of Shipping during the early months of British involvement in the Second World War but died in office of a heart attack in London on 30 March 1940,

== Other appointments ==
Gilmour was Master of the Fife Fox Hounds, 1902–1906, and a Member of Fife County Council 1901–1910. He was Rector of the University of Edinburgh, 1926–1929, and was awarded honorary degrees by the University of Glasgow in 1925, the University of Edinburgh in 1927, and the University of St Andrews in 1929. He was a Brigadier with the Royal Company of Archers. He was made Vice-Lieutenant for the County of Fife on 27 March 1936. Appointed Knight Grand Cross of the Royal Victorian Order (GCVO) in 1935.

== Family ==
Gilmour first married Mary Louise Lambert, daughter of Edward Tiley Lambert, of Telham Court, Battle, Sussex, on 9 April 1902 at St. Mary's Church in Battle, Sussex. The marriage produced two children, Anne Margaret, born in October 1909, and John, born in October 1912. After Mary Louise's death in 1919, he married her younger sister (his former sister-in-law), Violet Agnes Lambert, in 1920. They had one daughter, Daphne, born in January 1922.

Both children from his first marriage rose to positions of prominence in the civil service. His eldest daughter, Dame Anne Margaret Bryans DBE DStJ, worked for the British Red Cross Society and served as vice-chairman of the executive committee from 1964 to 1976, in addition to holding positions in the governorship of many hospitals in the United Kingdom. He was succeeded in the baronetcy by his son, Sir John Gilmour, 3rd Baronet, who also had a successful political career.

His great-nephew, George Younger, 4th Viscount Younger of Leckie, was also a Conservative MP and served as Scottish Secretary from 1979 to 1986.

== Notes ==
Parliament of the United Kingdom
Preceded by Robert Laidlaw	Member of Parliament for East Renfrewshire; January 1910–1918	Succeeded by Robert Nichol
New constituency	Member of Parliament for Glasgow Pollok; 1918–1940	Succeeded by Thomas Dunlop Galbraith
Political offices
Preceded by William Adamson	Secretary for Scotland; 1924–1926	Succeeded by Himself as Secretary of State for Scotland
Preceded by Himself as Secretary for Scotland	Secretary of State for Scotland; 1926–1929	Succeeded by William Adamson
Preceded by Christopher Addison	Minister of Agriculture; 1931–1932	Succeeded by Walter Elliot
Preceded by Sir Herbert Samuel	Home Secretary; 1932–1935	Succeeded by Sir John Simon
New office	Minister of Shipping; 1939–1940	Succeeded by Robert Hudson
Academic offices
Preceded by Stanley Baldwin	Rector of the University of Edinburgh; 1926–1929	Succeeded by Winston Churchill
Baronetage of the United Kingdom
Preceded by John Gilmour	Baronet (of Lundin); 1920–1940	Succeeded by John Edward Gilmour
