= Pollok, Gilmour and Company =

Pollok, Gilmour, and Company was a Glasgow-based timber-importing firm established in 1804 by Allan Gilmour, Sr and the brothers John Pollok and Arthur Pollok. The company soon became the leading British firm in the North American timber trade.

== British North American operations ==
The Miramichi operations, established by Alexander Rankin, had originally been conceived by Allan Gilmour as a means of beating Napoleon's Continental System, which prohibited lumber exports to Britain from the Baltic countries. Robert Rankin, Alexander's brother, established another branch of the firm, Robert Rankin and Company, in Saint John, New Brunswick. The Saint John branch soon became the most successful operation in Pollok, Gilmour, and Company's empire.

Pollok, Gilmour, and Company was a vast North Atlantic concern which by 1838 operated 130 vessels in the timber trade – making it the largest British shipowning firm at the time – and employed no fewer than 15,000 men in its sawmills, on its wharves, and in the forests; it owned as well 2,000 horses and oxen for draught purposes. In the early 1830s the firm shipped out annually over 300 cargoes of timber.

== Rankin, Gilmour and Company ==
A dispute among the founding partners erupted in 1837, and in 1838 Robert Rankin returned to Glasgow to settle the dispute. Robert maintained the helm of the firm throughout his remaining years, renaming it as Rankin, Gilmour and Company, and moving the headquarters to Liverpool, England.

In order to employ its large fleet fully in the winter months, branch houses were opened in New Orleans, and Mobile, Alabama, where the company entered the rapidly expanding cotton trade. The diversification into cotton brought great profits, and by 1851 Rankin was a member of the Dock Committee of Liverpool.

== Bibliography ==
- Rankin, John (1921). A history of our firm: being some account of the firm of Pollok, Gilmour and Co. and its offshoots and connections, 1804-1920. Liverpool, UK: Henry Young & Sons.
