= Sir John Gilmour, 1st Baronet =

Colonel Sir John Gilmour, 1st Baronet, DL (1845–1920) was chairman of the Scottish Conservative and Unionist Party, and was created a baronet in 1897.

== Life ==
He was the son of Allan Gilmour, owner of a large shipping company based in Renfrew, and Agnes Strang.

He acquired the estate of Lundin in 1872 and Montrave in 1873. He later acquired estates at Greenside, Pratis and Kilmux (all in Fife).

He commissioned in to The Fife Light Horse in 1874 as a Lieutenant taking command of the Regiment as Lt-Colonel from 1895 to 1901.

He was also Master of The Fife Foxhounds.

He married Henrietta Gilmour (1850-1926), his first cousin, in 1873. She was a pioneer of photography.

In 1885 they jointly formed the Lundin and Montrave Curling Club, its curling pond being on their own estate at Montrave House, a few miles south of Cupar in Fife. This was one of the first British sporting establishments to have both male and female members.

He was created a baronet in June 1897, travelling to London with Henrietta for Queen Victoria to bestow this honour upon him, as part of her Diamond Jubilee celebrations

They had seven children, three sons John (born 1876), Harry (1878-1926), Douglas (born 1889) and two daughters Maud (born 1882) and Henrietta (born 1884). Two children, Allan and Ronald, died in infancy.

Baronetage of the United Kingdom
New creation	Baronet (of Lundin and Montrave); 1897–1920	Succeeded by John Gilmour
