= National Liberal Party (UK) election results =

UK political party election results

This article lists the National Liberal Party's election results in UK parliamentary elections.

== Summary of general election performance ==
Year	Number of Candidates	Total votes	Average votes per candidate	% UK vote	Change (percentage points)	Saved deposits	Number of MPs
1931	41	809,302	19,739	3.7	N/A	41	35
1935	44	784,608	17,832	3.7	N/A	44	33
1945	49	686,652	14,013	2.8	-0.9	49	11
1950	55	985,343	17,915	3.4	+0.6	55	16
1951	55	1,058,138	19,239	3.7	+0.3	55	19
1955	45	842,133	18,714	3.1	-0.6	45	21
1959	39	765,794	19,636	2.7	-0.4	39	20
1964	19	326,130	17,165	1.2	-1.5	19	6
1966	9	149,779	16,642	0.5	-0.7	9	3

Source: F. W. S. Craig, British Electoral Facts, 1885–1975, p.55

== Election results ==
=== 1931 general election ===
Constituency	Candidate	Votes	%	Position
Ashford	Roderick Kedward	14,681	41.3	2
Barnsley	Richard John Soper	21,392	50.9	1
Bishop Auckland	Aaron Curry	17,551	51.4	1
Bosworth	William Edge	29,926	68.0	1
Clay Cross	Jacob Weinberg	11,611	35.4	2
Consett	John Purcell Dickie	22,474	53.0	1
Denbigh	Henry Morris-Jones	unopposed	N/A	1
Dunfermline Burghs	John Wallace	16,863	57.9	1
East Dorset	Alec Ewart Glassey	18,801	40.4	2
East Fife	James Duncan Millar	unopposed	N/A	1
East Norfolk	William Lygon	25,945	79.8	1
Eddisbury	Richard John Russell	unopposed	N/A	1
Eye	Edgar Granville	unopposed	N/A	1
Flintshire	Frederick Llewellyn-Jones	40,405	71.4	1
Gateshead	Thomas Magnay	34,764	60.1	1
Great Yarmouth	Arthur Harbord	21,008	78.6	1
Greenock	Godfrey Collins	18,013	51.1	1
Harwich	Percy Pybus	26,818	86.4	1
Holland with Boston	James Blindell	30,375	77.5	1
Huddersfield	William Mabane	47,056	70.1	1
Huntingdonshire	Sidney Peters	23,102	83.3	1
Inverness	Murdoch Macdonald	18,702	65.3	1
Leith	Ernest Brown	24,847	65.0	1
Luton	Leslie Burgin	32,015	80.2	1
Montgomeryshire	Clement Davies	unopposed	N/A	1
Montrose Burghs	Robert Hutchison	17,212	77.0	1
Newcastle-upon-Tyne East	Robert Aske	24,552	63.4	1
Norwich	Geoffrey Shakespeare	40,925	30.4	1
Nuneaton	Herbert Willison	12,811	20.7	3
Plymouth Devonport	Leslie Hore-Belisha	23,459	72.2	1
Pontypool	Thomas Keens	14,709	43.7	2
Ross and Cromarty	Ian Macpherson	unopposed	N/A	1
St Ives	Walter Runciman	unopposed	N/A	1
Shoreditch	Charles Summersby	19,596	56.7	1
Southampton	Charles Barrie	54,269	33.6	2
South Molton	George Lambert	25,700	88.0	1
Southwark North [CHECK]	Edward Anthony Strauss	13,045	64.9	1
Spen Valley	John Simon	28,647	64.6	1
Swansea West	Lewis Jones	20,603	58.6	1
Wentworth	Charlotte Isabel Hilyer	14,462	31.2	2
Western Isles	Thomas Ramsay	5,793	54.8	1

Barrie won in Southampton by taking second place in a two-seat constituency.

=== By-elections, 1931-1935 ===
By-election	Candidate	Votes	%	Position
Montrose Burghs by-election, 1932	Charles Kerr	7,963	46.9	1
East Fife by-election, 1933	James Henderson-Stewart	15,770	52.2	1
Dumfriesshire by-election, 1935	Henry Fildes	16,271	60.3	1

=== 1935 general election ===
Constituency	Candidate	Votes	%	Position
Barnsley	Richard John Soper	17,683	41.1	2
Bermondsey West	Frank Glanville	7,674	37.8	2
Bosworth	William Edge	22,969	59.2	1
Burnley	Gordon Campbell	26,965	46.4	2
Burslem	William Allen	15,227	45.8	2
Combined Scottish Universities	George Alexander Morrison	7,529	27.7	2
Consett	John Purcell Dickie	17,897	41.3	2
Denbigh*	Henry Morris-Jones	17,372	50.1	1
Dumfriesshire	Henry Fildes	22,053	65.4	1
Dunfermline Burghs	John Wallace	14,848	47.7	2
Durham	William McKeag	14,910	40.9	2
East Fife	James Henderson-Stewart	27,915	82.3	1
East Norfolk	William Lygon	23,108	68.8	1
Eddisbury	Richard John Russell	unopposed	N/A	1
Eye	Edgar Granville	21,606	73.9	1
Gateshead	Thomas Magnay	28,772	52.7	1
Great Yarmouth	Arthur Harbord	16,998	59.3	1
Greenock	Godfrey Collins	20,299	52.7	1
Harwich	Stanley Holmes	21,716	70.3	1
Holland with Boston	James Blindell	25,162	65.5	1
Huddersfield	William Mabane	37,009	60.8	1
Huntingdonshire	Sidney Peters	17,287	68.7	1
Inverness	Murdoch Macdonald	14,985	56.4	1
Leith	Ernest Brown	18,888	57.7	1
Luton	Leslie Burgin	28,809	65.5	1
Montgomeryshire	Clement Davies	unopposed	N/A	1
Montrose Burghs	Charles Kerr	15,198	69.6	1
Newcastle-upon-Tyne East	Robert Aske	23,146	58.6	1
Norwich	Geoffrey Shakespeare	36,039	29.1	1
Oldham	John Samuel Dodd	34,755	24.1	2
Plymouth Devonport	Leslie Hore-Belisha	20,852	68.1	1
Pontefract	Victor Seeley	17,257	46.6	2
Ross and Cromarty	Ian Macpherson	10,810	76.7	1
Rotherham*	Thomas Worrall Casey	14,298	32.5	2
St Ives	Walter Runciman	unopposed	N/A	1
Shoreditch	Somerset Brooke	11,673	38.6	2
Southampton	Charles Barrie	43,697	29.3	2
South Molton	George Lambert	20,767	78.7	1
Southwark North	Edward Anthony Strauss	8,086	50.2	1
Spen Valley	John Simon	21,671	50.8	1
Sunderland	Stephen Noel Furness	49,001	30.2	1
Swansea West	Lewis Jones	18,784	52.9	1
Walsall	Joseph Leckie	28,563	57.5	1
Western Isles	Thomas Ramsay	4,076	30.9	2

Morrison in Combined Scottish Universities, Dodd in Oldham and Barrie in Southampton won seats by taking second place in a two seat constituency.

=== By-elections, 1935-1945 ===
By-election	Candidate	Votes	%	Position
Greenock by-election, 1936	Vivian Emery Cornelius	17,990	46.6	2
Holland with Boston by-election, 1937	Herbert Butcher	21,846	60.0	1
St Ives by-election, 1937	Alec Beechman	13,044	50.4	1
Pontypridd by-election, 1938	Juliet Rhys-Williams	14,810	40.1	2
Barnsley by-election, 1938	Seymour Howard	13,052	35.6	2
Walsall by-election, 1938	George Ernest Schuster	28,720	57.1	1
East Norfolk by-election, 1939	Frank Medlicott	18,257	62.9	1
Southwark North by-election, 1939	Alfred Henderson-Livesey	4,322	42.6	2
Montrose Burghs by-election, 1940	John Maclay	unopposed	N/A	1
Spen Valley by-election, 1940	William Woolley	unopposed	N/A	1
Eddisbury by-election, 1943	Thomas Peacock	7,537	41.0	2

=== 1945 general election ===
Constituency	Candidate	Votes	%	Position
Barnsley	Richard John Soper	11,382	27.1	2
Bermondsey West	Bernard Pemberton	2,238	19.8	2
Bishop Auckland	William John Wilson Tiley	11,240	35.9	2
Bosworth	James Millard Tucker	20,854	44.4	2
Bradford South	Herbert Walker Peel	15,392	33.1	2
Bristol North	John Henshaw Britton	16,648	42.2	2
Burnley	Herbert Monckton Milnes	9,877	29.8	2
Burslem	Frederic Bennett	15,227	45.8	2
Consett	James Aloysius McGilley	12,198	29.9	2
Denbigh	Henry Morris-Jones	17,023	41.7	1
Dewsbury	Ernest Kilner	8,674	29.9	2
Dumfriesshire	Niall Macpherson	16,465	47.4	1
Dunfermline Burghs	James Henderson	12,028	35.3	2
Durham	John Bunyan	12,331	33.8	2
East Fife	James Henderson-Stewart	24,765	69.4	1
East Norfolk	Frank Medlicott	23,307	55.8	1
Eddisbury	John Barlow	15,294	57.7	1
Gateshead	Thomas Magnay	17,719	32.5	2
Gower	John Aeron-Thomas	14,115	31.5	2
Great Yarmouth	Percy Jewson	7,974	44.2	2
Hackney South	Stanley Price	4,901	24.2	2
Harwich	Stanley Holmes	16,452	55.7	1
Holland with Boston	Herbert Butcher	26,939	55.9	1
Huddersfield	William Mabane	24,496	35.5	2
Huntingdonshire	David Renton	15,389	50.1	1
Inverness	Murdoch Macdonald	12,090	43.3	1
Jarrow	Stanley Holmes	11,649	34.0	3
Lambeth North	Eric William Bales	2,624	20.1	2
Leith	Ernest Brown	10,116	31.4	2
Luton	Bruno Brown	31,914	44.8	2
Manchester Clayton	Phillip Smith	9,883	30.6	2
Montrose Burghs	John Maclay	13,966	58.2	1
Neath	David Bowen	8,466	16.9	2
Newcastle-upon-Tyne East	Richard O'Sullivan	11,774	31.1	2
Norwich	Geoffrey Shakespeare	25,945	23.0	3
Oldham	John Samuel Dodd	24,199	18.2	4
Rotherham	E. H. Phillips	12,420	25.8	2
St Ives	Alec Beechman	14,256	47.3	1
Sheffield Hillsborough	Robert Hampden Hobart	14,404	36.6	2
Shoreditch	Frederick Boult	4,081	26.0	2
Southampton	William Stanley Russell Thomas	22,650	17.4	4
South Molton	George Lambert	19,065	67.6	1
South Shields	Donald Maurice Parry	15,296	40.6	2
Southwark North	Edward Terrell	2,673	31.0	2
Spen Valley	William Woolley	19,621	43.3	2
Sunderland	Stephen Noel Furness	29,366	21.3	3
Swansea East	Rowe Harding	6,102	24.2	2
Swansea West	Lewis Jones	13,089	42.0	2
Walsall	George Ernest Schuster	24,197	46.1	2
West Fife	Robert Scott Stevenson	8,597	20.6	3
Wrexham	David Leslie Milne	13,714	28.6	2

=== By-elections, 1945-1950 ===
By-election	Candidate	Votes	%	Position
Combined Scottish Universities by-election, 1946	Robert Scott Stevenson	1,938	5.9	5
Edinburgh East by-election, 1947	D. Mathews	11,490	34.4	2
Bradford South by-election, 1949	John Lightfoot Windle	19,313	42.4	2

=== 1950 general election ===
Constituency	Candidate	Votes	%	Position
Aberavon	Auberon Herbert	8,091	19.0	2
Barnsley	Charles Gordon-Spencer	8,480	13.8	3
Bradford Central	Thomas Boyce	13,375	31.6	2
Bradford East	Geoffrey Francis Greenbank	12,527	27.0	2
Bradford North	William Taylor	20,628	45.7	1
Bradford South	John Lightfoot Windle	15,998	35.6	2
Brighouse and Spenborough	William Woolley	23,456	47.8	2
Bristol North East	Violet Bathurst	16,082	38.9	2
Cannock	Marjorie Hicking	15,818	32.1	2
Central Norfolk	Frank Medlicott	20,407	51.3	1
Chesterfield	Andrew Cavendish	17,231	30.9	2
Dearne Valley	Aymée Lavender Dower	10,365	20.4	2
Denbigh	Emlyn Garner Evans	17,473	38.9	1
Dumfries	Niall Macpherson	26,268	59.3	1
Dundee East	James Henderson	22,863	46.2	2
Dundee West	Henry Scrymgeour-Wedderburn	23,685	44.6	2
Dunfermline Burghs	James Stuart Kerr	14,967	38.8	2
East Fife	James Henderson-Stewart	25,749	63.7	1
Edinburgh Leith	Eoin Cameron Mekie	15,841	43.0	2
Gateshead East	Douglas Clift	13,530	40.1	2
Gateshead West	John Magnay	11,660	35.8	2
Gloucester	Anthony Kershaw	15,708	37.1	2
Gower	Rowe Harding	10,208	23.9	2
Harwich	Stanley Holmes	22,814	50.6	1
Hemsworth	Jean Patricia Asquith	10,254	17.6	2
Holland with Boston	Herbert Butcher	30,336	53.9	1
Huntingdonshire	David Renton	18,551	51.4	1
Lincoln	Francis Hill	17,784	41.3	2
Luton	Charles Hill	22,946	46.6	1
Motherwell	A. D. Robertson	14,183	34.0	2
Normanton	Thomas Heseltine	10,929	25.5	2
North Angus and Mearns	Colin Thornton-Kemsley	15,485	51.5	1
North Norfolk	Douglas Reid	17,741	43.0	2
Pembrokeshire	Gwilym Lloyd-George	25,421	49.9	2
Plymouth Devonport	Randolph Churchill	27,329	44.9	2
Pontefract	Maurice Grant	11,431	24.4	2
Ross and Cromarty	John MacLeod	10,912	62.6	1
St Ives	Greville Howard	16,653	46.0	1
Sheffield Attercliffe	Lionel Farris	12,185	28.4	2
Sheffield Brightside	H. S. V. Smith	13,136	28.1	2
Sheffield Hallam	Roland Jennings	28,159	65.1	1
Sheffield Heeley	Peter Roberts	26,560	56.3	1
Sheffield Hillsborough	Knowles Edge	19,613	39.8	2
Sheffield Neepsend	A. M. Cook	11,311	27.2	2
Sheffield Park	Harold Pryce	13,678	30.3	2
South Angus	James Duncan	19,324	53.9	1
Southampton Itchen	Robert Hampton Hobart	24,536	44.1	2
Southampton Test	P. Brembridge	23,663	45.2	2
South Bedfordshire	William Fearnley-Whittingstall	18,546	41.8	2
Swansea West	Lewis Jones	22,608	46.3	2
Torrington	George Lambert	19,128	51.1	1
Walsall	John Barlow	28,700	44.0	2
West Fife	Patrick William Neill Fraser	10,131	23.6	2
West Renfrewshire	John Maclay	20,810	53.9	1
Wrexham	Willoughby Gervase Cooper	14,117	25.5	2

Richard Nugent is not listed; he was elected as a Conservative, but joined the National Liberal group in Parliament.

=== By-elections, 1950-1951 ===
Election	Candidate	Votes	%	Position
Sheffield Neepsend by-election, 1950	John Philip Hunt	8,365	26.8	2
Brighouse and Spenborough by-election, 1950	William Woolley	23,567	49.5	2

=== 1951 general election ===
Constituency	Candidate	Votes	%	Position
Barnsley	Geoffrey Whitaker	9,296	17.3	2
Bradford Central	Arthur Tiley	16,343	39.3	2
Bradford East	Frederick William Howard Cook	16,999	37.1	2
Bradford North	William Taylor	24,524	54.3	1
Bradford South	Geoffrey Francis Greenbank	17,863	39.4	2
Brighouse and Spenborough	William Woolley	23,828	47.7	2
Bristol North East	George Nixon-Eckersall	19,410	47.0	2
Cannock	Alan Farrington	16,041	33.1	2
Central Norfolk	Frank Medlicott	21,909	55.9	1
Chesterfield	John Nash	19,776	36.3	2
Denbigh	Emlyn Garner Evans	20,269	45.7	1
Dewsbury	James Ramsden	19,562	36.4	2
Dumfries	Niall Macpherson	26,386	61.3	1
Dundee East	Janet Sutherland Murray	22,863	46.2	2
Dunfermline Burghs	James Stuart Kerr	15,657	38.9	2
East Fife	James Henderson-Stewart	28,446	70.6	1
Edinburgh Leith	Eoin Cameron Mekie	19,236	49.9	2
Gateshead East	Douglas Clift	14,344	42.4	2
Gateshead West	John Magnay	11,811	36.2	2
Gloucester	Anthony Kershaw	18,836	43.6	2
Goole	Anthony Marreco	17,073	39.6	2
Gower	Rowe Harding	10,351	24.1	2
Grimsby	Charles William Hewson	22,611	43.4	2
Harwich	Stanley Holmes	26,169	58.9	1
Holland with Boston	Herbert Butcher	31,683	57.9	1
Huntingdonshire	David Renton	20,845	57.4	1
Kirkcaldy Burghs	Ralph Harris	17,484	39.4	2
Luton	Charles Hill	26,554	52.7	1
Motherwell	Norman Sloan	17,650	42.7	2
Normanton	Thomas Heseltine	11,199	26.5	2
North Norfolk	Douglas Reid	20,788	49.7	2
Newcastle-upon-Tyne North	Gwilym Lloyd-George	23,930	51.1	1
North Angus and Mearns	Colin Thornton-Kemsley	18,515	64.1	1
Plymouth Devonport	Randolph Churchill	29,768	48.1	2
Pontefract	Mervyn Pike	11,043	23.8	2
Ross and Cromarty	John MacLeod	10,969	64.3	1
St Ives	Greville Howard	18,828	53.3	1
Sheffield Attercliffe	Herbert Lambert	12,161	28.9	2
Sheffield Brightside	Alfred Wood	12,433	27.6	2
Sheffield Hallam	Roland Jennings	29,016	70.8	1
Sheffield Heeley	Peter Roberts	27,776	61.0	1
Sheffield Hillsborough	George Wadsworth	19,617	41.0	2
Sheffield Neepsend	Arthur Stobbs	10,655	27.0	2
Sheffield Park	Stanley Rippon	13,743	30.8	2
Southampton Itchen	Reginald Stranger	25,708	45.9	2
Southampton Test	John Paul	25,965	49.6	2
South Angus	James Duncan	24,478	70.9	1
South Bedfordshire	Norman Cole	22,917	50.9	1
Stoke-on-Trent North	James Coventry	14,668	28.6	2
Torrington	George Lambert	23,162	66.2	1
Western Isles	John Mitchell	6,709	40.7	2
West Fife	John Patterson Fyfe	11,038	24.6	2
West Renfrewshire	John Maclay	21,546	53.8	1
Wolverhampton North East	John Ellis	18,563	37.7	2
Wrexham	Willoughby Gervase Cooper	19,124	34.8	2

Richard Nugent is not listed; he was elected as a Conservative, but joined the National Liberal group in Parliament.

=== By-elections, 1951-1955 ===
By-election	Candidate	Votes	%	Position
Dundee East by-election, 1952	Paul Cowcher	14,035	35.6	2
Barnsley by-election 1953	Geoffrey Whitaker	10,905	27.1	2
Harwich by-election, 1954	Julian Ridsdale	19,532	59.1	1
Motherwell by-election, 1954	Norman Sloan	13,334	39.3	2
Wrexham by-election, 1955	Griffith Winston Guthrie Jones	12,476	30.8	2

=== 1955 general election ===
Constituency	Candidate	Votes	%	Position
Barnsley	Anthony Wilson	14,776	27.2	2
Bradford East	George Barber	14,713	38.4	2
Bradford North	William Taylor	21,084	50.1	1
Bradford South	Reginald Winston Jones	16,768	38.7	2
Bradford West	Arthur Tiley	22,306	53.8	1
Brighouse and Spenborough	Frederick William Howard Cook	22,048	48.2	2
Bristol North East	David Webster	21,864	44.8	2
Cannock	John Newey	18,379	40.8	2
Central Norfolk	Frank Medlicott	21,851	57.3	1
Chesterfield	Frank Hadfield	21,748	42.4	2
Denbigh	Emlyn Garner Evans	18,312	43.2	1
Dumfries	Niall Macpherson	24,550	61.3	1
Dunfermline Burghs	Charlotte McNee	14,170	39.0	2
Dundee East	Robert Taylor	21,606	45.7	2
Dundee West	Gordon Pirie	24,208	46.9	2
East Fife	James Henderson-Stewart	26,104	70.6	1
Edinburgh Leith	Janet Sutherland Shearer	10,693	32.3	2
Goole	Gavin Welby	15,456	37.8	2
Gower	Gwyther Jones	8,135	21.1	2
Harwich	Julian Ridsdale	23,889	56.4	1
Holland with Boston	Herbert Butcher	28,412	53.2	1
Huntingdonshire	David Renton	20,609	58.4	1
Kirkcaldy Burghs	Duncan Drummond Young	16,392	40.7	2
Luton	Charles Hill	24,722	51.3	1
Merionethshire	John Jenkins	3,001	12.7	4
Newcastle-upon-Tyne North	Gwilym Lloyd-George	25,236	63.8	1
North Angus and Mearns	Colin Thornton-Kemsley	18,516	69.0	1
North Norfolk	William Scarlett Jameson	19,657	48.5	2
Plymouth Devonport	Joan Vickers	24,821	47.1	1
Pontefract	Anthony Geoffrey Blake	10,183	23.8	2
Ross and Cromarty	John MacLeod	9,929	62.3	1
St Ives	Greville Howard	17,063	52.0	1
Sheffield Attercliffe	Herbert Lambert	13,503	29.0	2
Sheffield Brightside	Edward Flynn	12,239	29.6	2
Sheffield Hallam	Roland Jennings	30,069	66.2	1
Sheffield Heeley	Peter Roberts	30,798	60.9	1
Sheffield Hillsborough	Stanley Kenneth Arnold	16,428	41.2	2
Sheffield Park	Stanley Rippon	10,565	26.8	2
South Angus	James Duncan	23,967	72.7	1
South Bedfordshire	Norman Cole	23,365	52.8	1
Torrington	George Lambert	20,124	65.1	1
Walsall North	Francis Roberts	15,970	37.5	2
Western Isles	John Frame	6,315	42.7	2
West Renfrewshire	John Maclay	21,283	55.2	1
Wrexham	Griffith Winston Guthrie Jones	16,286	33.0	2

Richard Nugent is not listed; he was elected as a Conservative, but joined the National Liberal group in Parliament.

=== By-elections, 1955-1959 ===
By-election	Candidate	Votes	%	Position
Torrington by-election, 1958	Anthony Royle	13,189	37.4	2

=== 1959 general election ===
Constituency	Candidate	Votes	%	Position
Bradford East	Desmond Dalgleish	14,529	42.0	2
Bradford North	William Taylor	22,850	53.1	1
Bradford South	Reginald Winston Jones	18,158	39.3	2
Bradford West	Arthur Tiley	23,012	56.2	1
Brighouse and Spenborough	Michael Shaw	23,243	49.9	2
Bristol North East	Alan Hopkins	24,258	47.7	1
Cannock	Philip Lugg	22,485	43.1	2
Central Norfolk	Richard Collard	21,918	50.3	1
Chesterfield	James Anthony Lemkin	17,084	31.6	2
Denbigh	Geraint Morgan	17,893	41.7	1
Dumfries	Niall Macpherson	25,867	58.4	1
Dundee East	Robert McCrindle	22,082	45.7	2
Dundee West	Robert Taylor	25,143	48.3	2
Dunfermline Burghs	Archie Elliott	14,744	38.6	2
East Fife	James Henderson-Stewart	26,585	69.9	1
Edinburgh Leith	Gershom Stewart	12,018	38.0	2
Goole	Douglas Sisson	16,581	38.6	2
Gower	Michael Heseltine	9,837	24.0	2
Harwich	Julian Ridsdale	23,653	53.2	1
Holland with Boston	Herbert Butcher	29,013	53.5	1
Huntingdonshire	David Renton	20,254	53.9	1
Luton	Charles Hill	27,153	55.1	1
North Angus and Mearns	Colin Thornton-Kemsley	17,536	67.4	1
North Norfolk	Frank Henry Easton	19,126	49.2	2
Plymouth Devonport	Joan Vickers	28,481	56.4	1
Pontefract	Edward Bowman	10,884	23.6	2
Ross and Cromarty	John MacLeod	7,813	47.2	1
St Ives	Greville Howard	15,700	47.9	1
Sheffield Attercliffe	Herbert Lambert	15,304	31.2	2
Sheffield Brightside	Hugo Clifford Holmes	12,269	29.3	2
Sheffield Hallam	John Osborn	28,747	62.7	1
Sheffield Heeley	Peter Roberts	33,236	59.0	1
Sheffield Hillsborough	Stanley Kenneth Arnold	16,845	43.5	2
Sheffield Park	John Neill	10,598	28.9	2
South Angus	James Duncan	19,435	57.1	1
South Bedfordshire	Norman Cole	25,861	47.1	1
Western Isles	Donny MacLeod	7,496	46.4	2
West Renfrewshire	John Maclay	20,959	53.5	1
Wrexham	Griffith H. Pierce	17,144	31.9	2

Richard Nugent is not listed; he was elected as a Conservative, but joined the National Liberal group in Parliament.

=== By-elections, 1959-1964 ===
By-election	Candidate	Votes	%	Position
Brighouse and Spenborough by-election, 1960	Michael Shaw	22,472	50.8	1
Central Norfolk by-election, 1962	Ian Gilmour	13,268	37.7	1
Dundee West by-election, 1963	Robert Taylor	25,143	48.3	2

=== 1964 general election ===
Constituency	Candidate	Votes	%	Position
Bradford East	Trevor Lewis	11,075	38.2	2
Bradford North	William Taylor	16,507	40.2	2
Bradford South	Derek Bottomley	17,097	37.7	2
Bradford West	Arthur Tiley	21,121	54.0	1
Brighouse and Spenborough	Michael Shaw	19,812	42.2	2
Bristol North East	Alan Hopkins	22,423	46.7	1
Dundee East	John Leslie Marshall	21,499	45.2	2
Dundee West	Henry Campbell Scarlett	22,473	44.3	2
Dunfermline Burghs	Ian Kirkwood	14,033	38.5	2
Edinburgh Leith	Gershom Stewart	12,777	44.5	2
Goole	Donald Chapman	15,435	36.9	2
Gower	Huw Griffith	8,822	22.5	2
Harwich	Julian Ridsdale	25,102	50.4	1
Holland with Boston	Herbert Butcher	29,082	55.4	1
Huntingdonshire	David Renton	20,320	51.1	1
Kirkcaldy Burghs	Neil Gow	11,756	29.1	2
Ross and Cromarty	John Macleod	5,516	32.1	2
St Ives	Greville Howard	14,040	42.6	1
Wrexham	Griffith H. Pierce	17,240	32.9	2

John Osborn and Peter Roberts are not listed; they were elected as Conservatives, but joined the National Liberal group in Parliament.

=== 1966 general election ===
Constituency	Candidate	Votes	%	Position
Bradford East	Henry Sissling	8,091	30.5	2
Bradford West	Arthur Tiley	18,170	48.0	2
Brighouse and Spenborough	Cyril Donald Chapman	21,216	45.2	2
Bristol North East	Alan Hopkins	21,727	45.8	2
Goole	Richard Whitfield	13,969	34.0	2
Harwich	Julian Ridsdale	24,975	47.6	1
Huntingdonshire	David Renton	20,504	49.2	1
St Ives	John Nott	14,312	41.3	1
Wrexham	Griffith H. Pierce	12,596	24.6	2
