= List of National Liberal Party (UK, 1931) MPs =

This is a list of National Liberal Party MPs. It includes all members of Parliament elected to the British House of Commons representing the National Liberal Party, originally known as the Liberal National Party. In 1947, the party merged with the Conservative Party, so all its remaining MPs jointly represented both parties.

Name	Constituency	Start	End
William Allen	Burslem	1931	1935
Robert Aske	Newcastle upon Tyne East	1931 (Note: Previously a Liberal Party MP.)	1945
John Barlow	Eddisbury	1945	1950
Charles Barrie	Southampton	1931	1940
Alec Beechman	St Ives	1937	1950
Robert Bernays	Bristol North	1936	1945
James Blindell	Holland with Boston	1931	1937
Ernest Brown	Leith	1931	1945
Leslie Burgin	Luton	1931	1945
Herbert Butcher	Holland with Boston	1937	1966
Gordon Campbell	Burnley	1931	1935
Norman Cole	South Bedfordshire	1951	1955
Richard Collard	Norfolk Central	1959	1962
Godfrey Collins	Greenock	1931	1936
Aaron Charlton Curry	Bishop Auckland	1931	1935
Clement Davies	Montgomeryshire	1931	1939 (Note: Became an Independent Liberal MP, and later rejoined the Liberal Party.)
John Purcell Dickie	Consett	1931	1935
John Dodd	Oldham	1935	1945
James Duncan	South Angus	1950	1964
William Edge	Bosworth	1931	1945
Emlyn Garner Evans	Denbigh	1950	1959
Henry Fildes	Dumfriesshire	1935	1945
Stephen Furness	Sunderland	1935	1945
Ian Gilmour	Norfolk Central	1962	1964
Edgar Granville	Eye	1931	1942
Arthur Harbord	Great Yarmouth	1931	1941
James Henderson-Stewart	East Fife	1933	1961
Charles Hill	Luton	1950	1963
Herbert Holdsworth	Bradford South	1938	1945
Stanley Holmes	Harwich	1935	1954
Alan Hopkins	Bristol North East	1959	1966
Leslie Hore-Belisha	Plymouth Devonport	1931	1942
Greville Howard	St Ives	1950	1966
Joseph Hunter	Dumfriesshire	1934	1935
Robert Hutchison	Montrose	1931	1932
Percy Jewson	Great Yarmouth	1941	1945
Lewis Jones	Swansea West	1931	1945
Charles Kerr	Montrose	1932	1940
George Lambert (1st)	South Molton	1931	1945
George Lambert (2nd)	South Molton	1945	1950
George Lambert (2nd)	Torrington	1950	1958
Joseph Leckie	Walsall	1931	1938
Frederick Llewellyn-Jones	Flintshire	1931	1932
Gwilym Lloyd George	Newcastle upon Tyne North	1951	1957
William Lygon	East Norfolk	1931	1939
William Mabane	Huddersfield	1931	1945
Murdo Macdonald	Inverness	1931	1945 (Note: Resigned from the National Liberal group in the House of Commons in 1942 and stood as an Independent Liberal MP at the 1945 UK general election, but remained a member of his constituency association which was aligned with the National Liberals.)
John Maclay	Montrose	1940	1950
John Maclay	West Renfrewshire	1950	1964
John MacLeod	Ross and Cromarty	1945 (Note: Elected as an independent liberal candidate, joined the National Liberal group shortly after election.)	1964
Ian Macpherson	Ross and Cromarty	1931	1936
Niall Macpherson	Dumfries	1945	1963
Thomas Magnay	Gateshead	1931	1945
Frank Medlicott	Norfolk East	1939	1950
Frank Medlicott	Norfolk Central	1950	1959
James Duncan Millar	East Fife	1931	1933
(John) Henry Morris-Jones	Denbigh	1931	1942
(John) Henry Morris-Jones	Denbigh	1943	1950
George Alexander Morrison	Combined Scottish Universities	1935	1945
Francis Norie-Miller	Perth	1935	1935
John Nott	St Ives	1966	1968 (Note: Continued to represent the Conservative Party after the dissolution of the Liberal National Party.)
Sidney John Peters	Huntingdonshire	1931	1945
John Pybus	Harwich	1931	1935
Thomas Bridgehill Wilson Ramsay	Western Isles	1931	1935
David Renton	Huntingdonshire	1945	1968
Julian Ridsdale	Harwich	1954	1968
Walter Runciman	St Ives	1931	1937
Richard John Russell	Eddisbury	1931	1943
Sir George Ernest Schuster	Walsall	1938	1945
Sir Geoffrey Hithersay Shakespeare	Norwich	1931	1945
Michael Shaw	Brighouse and Spenborough	1960	1964
Sir John Simon	Spen Valley	1931	1940
Richard John Soper	Barnsley	1931	1935
Edward Strauss	Southwark North	1931	1939
Charles Summersby	Shoreditch	1931	1935
William Taylor	Bradford North	1950	1964
William Stanley Russell Thomas	Southampton	1940	1945
Arthur Tiley	Bradford West	1955	1966
Colin Thornton-Kemsley	North Angus and Mearns	1950	1964
Joan Vickers	Plymouth Devonport	1955	1964
John Wallace	Dunfermline Burghs	1931	1935
William Woolley	Spen Valley	1940	1945

== Graphical representation ==
Constituency	1931	1931	31	32	33	35	1935	36	37	38	39	40	40	41	42	43	45	1945	1950	1951	54	1955	57	58	1959	60	61	62	63	1964	1966
Huntingdonshire	Peters																	Renton													
St Ives	Runciman								Beechman										Howard												Nott
Harwich	Pybus						Holmes														Ridsdale										
Holland with Boston	Blindell								Butcher																						
Norfolk East / Norfolk C (1950)	Lygon										Medlicott														Collard			Gilmour			
Dumfriesshire / Dumfries (1950)	Hunter					Fildes												N. Macpherson													
East Fife	Millar				Henderson-Stewart																										
South Molton / Torrington (1950)	Lambert																	Lambert jnr													
Montrose Burghs	Hutchison			Kerr								Maclay																			
Leith	Brown																														
Luton	Burgin																		Hill												
Bosworth	Edge																														
Great Yarmouth	Harbord													Jewson																	
Norwich (one of two)	Shakespeare																														
Newcastle upon Tyne East	Aske																														
Spen Valley	Simon											Woolley																			
Eddisbury	Russell																	Barlow													
Eye	Granville																														
Inverness	Macdonald																														
Plymouth Devonport	Hore-Belisha																					Vickers									
Denbigh	Morris-Jones															Morris-Jones			Evans												
Montgomeryshire	Davies																														
Ross and Cromarty	I. Macpherson																			MacLeod											
Greenock	Collins																														
Western Isles	Ramsay																														
Flintshire	Llewellyn-Jones																														
Constituency	1931	1931	31	32	33	35	1935	36	37	38	39	40	40	41	42	43	45	1945	1950	1951	54	1955	57	58	1959	60	61	62	63	1964	1966
Gateshead		Magnay																													
Huddersfield		Mabane																													
Swansea West		Jones																													
Southampton (one of two)		Barrie											Thomas																		
Southwark North		Strauss																													
Dunfermline Burghs		Wallace																													
Bishop Auckland		Curry																													
Consett		Dickie																													
Burnley		Campbell																													
Shoreditch		Summersby																													
Barnsley		Soper																													
Walsall			Leckie							Schuster																					
Burslem			Allen																												
Perth						Norie-Miller																									
Combined Scottish Universities (1 of 3)						Morrison																									
Sunderland (one of two)							Furness																								
Oldham (one of two)							Dodd																								
Bristol North / Bristol NE (1950)								Bernays																	Hopkins						
Bradford South										Holdsworth																					
Bradford North																			Taylor												
Angus North and Mearns																			Thornton-Kemsley												
Angus South																			Duncan												
Renfrewshire West																			Maclay												
Bedfordshire South																				Cole											
Newcastle upon Tyne North																				Lloyd George											
Bradford West																						Tiley									
Brighouse and Spenborough																										Shaw					
Constituency	1931	1931	31	32	33	35	1935	36	37	38	39	40	40	41	42	43	45	1945	1950	1951	54	1955	57	58	1959	60	61	62	63	1964	1966
No. of National Liberal MPs	26	37	39	38	38	40	33	32	32	33	31	30	31	31	27	27	26	11	14	17	17	19	18	17	17	18	17	17	15	6	3
