= 1939 East Norfolk by-election =

UK parliamentary by-election

The 1939 East Norfolk by-election was a parliamentary by-election held on 26 January 1939 for the British House of Commons constituency of East Norfolk.

== Previous MP ==
The seat had become vacant on 14 November 1938, when the constituency's Liberal National Member of Parliament (MP), William Lygon, Viscount Elmley had succeeded to the peerage as the 8th Earl Beauchamp. He had been East Norfolk's MP since he was first elected as a Liberal at the 1929 general election, when he gained the seat from the Conservatives. He joined the breakaway Liberal Nationals in 1931, and at the following general election was not opposed by the Conservatives.

== Previous result ==
General election, 1935: Norfolk East
Party	Candidate	Votes	%	±%
Liberal National	Viscount Elmley	23,108	68.8	−11.0
Labour	Norman R. Tillett	10,461	31.2	+11.0
Majority		12,647	37.6	−22.0
Turnout		33,569	66.8	−4.9
Liberal National hold		Swing	-11.0	

== Candidates ==
Only two candidates contested the by-election: Frank Medlicott for the Liberal Nationals, and Norman Tillett for the Labour Party. Medlicott was a 36-year-old London solicitor who had not contested an election since standing for the Liberal Party at Acton in 1929. Tillett was a Norwich solicitor, whose great-grandfather and uncle were both Liberal MPs for Norwich. Tillett had fought the seat at the last general election.

A number of local Conservatives who were unhappy about supporting Medlicott tried to get an Independent Conservative candidate to stand. For a while, it seemed as if James F. Wright, the secretary of the Norfolk National Farmers' Union and former leader of the Agricultural Party, would run as an Independent Conservative, but by close of nominations, there were just the two candidates.

== Result ==
Medlicott held the seat for the Liberal Nationals, with a reduced but still substantial majority.

East Norfolk by-election, 26 January 1939
Party	Candidate	Votes	%	±%
Liberal National	Frank Medlicott	18,257	62.9	−5.9
Labour	Norman R. Tillett	10,785	37.1	+5.9
Majority		7,472	25.8	−11.8
Turnout		29,042	53.1	−13.7
Liberal National hold		Swing	−5.9	

== Aftermath ==
The 1945 general election was again a two-way contest between Medlicott and Tilett, and Medlicott held the seat.

General election, 1945: Norfolk East
Party	Candidate	Votes	%	±%
Liberal National	Frank Medlicott	23,307	55.8	−7.1
Labour	Norman R. Tillett	18,467	44.2	+7.1
Majority		4,840	11.8	−14.2
Turnout		41,774	68.9	+15.8
Liberal National hold		Swing	−7.1	

When the East Norfolk constituency was abolished for the 1950 general election, he was returned for the new Central Norfolk seat.

== See also ==
- East Norfolk constituency
- Norfolk
- Lists of United Kingdom by-elections
- United Kingdom by-election records
