= Beechman =

Beechman is a surname. Notable people with the surname include:

- Alec Beechman (1896–1965), British barrister and politician
- Laurie Beechman (1953–1998), American actress and singer
