= Allen Hopkins =

Allen Hopkins (or similar) may refer to:

- Allen Hopkins (pool player) (born 1951), professional pool (pocket billiards) player and commentator for ESPN
- Allen Hopkins (soccer commentator), football (soccer) commentator for the Los Angeles Galaxy team, and sideline reporter for ESPN's MLS Primetime Thursday
- Allan Hopkins, Australian rules footballer
- Alan Hopkins, British politician
