= Raymond Dobson =

British politician (1925–1980)

Raymond Francis Harvey Dobson (26 April 1925 – 22 September 1980) was a British trade union official, politician and airline company executive.

Dobson went to Purbrook Park School in Portsmouth. He joined the Labour Party in 1947 and had a career in the Union of Post Office Workers, on which he served on the Executive.

At the 1959 general election, Dobson fought Torrington, a seat which had been won by the Liberal Party in a 1958 byelection, but which the Conservatives won back in 1959. In 1960, Dobson was Labour candidate at the Tiverton by-election.

Dobson fought the marginal constituency of Bristol North East at the 1964 general election, failing by 1,211 votes to win it from the Conservatives. He fought the seat again in the 1966 general election and this time prevailed by nearly 4,000.

With a neighbouring seat, Tony Benn got on well with Dobson and appointed him as his Parliamentary Private Secretary in 1967. Harold Wilson promoted Dobson to be an Assistant Whip in October 1969. However, he lost his seat by 462 votes in the 1970 general election. He was appointed Director of Personnel for British Caledonian Airways. Later in the 1970s, Dobson served on the board of Gambia Airways (1974–77) and of Air Liberia (from 1976).

Parliament of the United Kingdom
Preceded by Alan Hopkins	Member of Parliament for Bristol North East; 1966–1970	Succeeded by Robert Adley
