= Henderson-Stewart baronets =

Baronetcy in the Baronetage of the United Kingdom

The Henderson-Stewart Baronetcy, of Callumshill in the County of Perth, is a title in the Baronetage of the United Kingdom. It was created on 28 March 1957 for James Henderson-Stewart, Member of Parliament for East Fife from 1933 to 1961 and Joint Under-Secretary of State for Scotland from 1952 to 1957. As of 2010, the title is held by his son, the second Baronet, who succeeded in 1961.

== Henderson-Stewart baronets, of Callumshill (1957) ==
- Sir James Henderson-Stewart, 1st Baronet (1897–1961)
- Sir David James Henderson-Stewart, 2nd Baronet (born 1941)

The heir apparent is the present holder's son David Henderson-Stewart (born 1973).
