= 1937 St Ives by-election =

UK parliamentary by-election

The 1937 St Ives by-election was a by-election held in England on 30 June 1937 for the UK House of Commons constituency of St Ives in Cornwall.

== Vacancy ==
The by-election was caused by the elevation to the peerage of the sitting Liberal National Member of Parliament (MP) Walter Runciman. Runciman had been MP for St Ives since 1929 initially as a Liberal. He was President of the Board of Trade from 1931 to 1937 but was replaced in the reshuffle which took place after Neville Chamberlain took over as prime minister from Stanley Baldwin and sent to the House of Lords in compensation.

== Candidates ==
The Liberal Nationals selected Alec Beechman, a 40-year-old barrister. Like Runciman, Beechman had been a lifelong Liberal, a former President of the Oxford University Liberal Club and one-time prospective Parliamentary candidate in Oldham. Again like Runciman, Beechman had continued to support the National Government after the mainstream Liberal Party withdrew over the issue Free trade and he joined the Simonite Liberal Nationals.

As the candidate of the National Government in a seat previously held by the Liberal Nationals, Beechman was not opposed by the government's Conservative or National Labour allies. Even by the 1930s, the St Ives seat had no real Labour Party tradition. St Ives has been characterised by Andrew Thorpe as a very weak Divisional Labour Party in the 1920s and 1930s. There were Labour candidates in 1924 and 1929 but they had come bottom of the poll and for this by-election Labour chose not to select a candidate.

Opposition to Beechman was therefore left in the hands of the mainstream Samuelite Liberals and they selected the veteran campaigner Isaac Foot. Plymouth born Foot was 57 years old and was the former Liberal MP for another Cornish seat, Bodmin. Foot represented a strand of Cornish Radicalism, bolstered by a strong Cornish Nonconformist especially Methodist tradition. Foot had helped Walter Runciman fight and win St Ives in 1929 but at the 1935 general election Runciman, along with other Liberal National ministers, campaigned against Foot in Bodmin and Foot lost the seat to the Conservatives. The by-election offered Foot an early opportunity to get back into the House of Commons but against the background of a divided Liberal family and the bitter personal history of Foot and Runciman, it promised to be a distasteful and keenly contested fight.

== Campaign ==
From the start, the independent Liberals planned an intensive campaign. The former Liberal leader, Herbert Samuel, (now in the House of Lords) was reported as marking his return to active politics by speaking at Penzance on 11 June and the current leader Sir Archibald Sinclair, Sir Francis Acland and Foot's son Dingle Foot MP all set early speaking dates for hustings meetings.

=== Issues ===
Like all by-elections, St Ives was essentially a contest between the record of the government of the day and an attack upon it by the opposition. During the campaign both camps took up position on either side of this traditional divide. Beechman got a letter of support from the new prime minister which urged supporters of the government to remember the record of social and industrial progress of the past few years. And former prime minister Ramsay MacDonald wrote about Britain's social progress under the National Government which people from abroad came to study and praised the government for its work on unemployment. Unsurprisingly Isaac Foot and his supporters found room to attack the government on foreign policy, appeasement, the economy and international trade.

==== Foreign policy ====
The Liberal Party may have been in retreat in Britain but Foot was particularly saddened by the defeats of liberalism overseas, in the Communist Soviet Union, in Nazi Germany and Benito Mussolini's Italy. In all these places, said Foot, liberals were imprisoned, exiled or intimidated into silence. Foot was outraged at the British government's failure to stand up to fascist assaults abroad, by the Japanese in Manchukuo, in Spain during the Civil War, by Mussolini in Abyssinia, and by the rise of Nazi Germany. Reinforcing Foot's concerns, Herbert Samuel, in his speech at Penzance, said the most urgent need of the day was to restore and enlarge the authority of the League of Nations, underlining his party's belief in the policy of collective security.

==== The fight for true Liberalism ====
The by-election also focused on the position of the Liberal Nationals and their right to regard themselves as true and independent Liberals. Samuel said that he would actually prefer a Conservative MP for St Ives rather than a Liberal National because Conservatives sometimes showed a spark of independence, whereas the Liberal Nationals never did. Because of his political background, Beechman always identified himself to the electorate as a Liberal but emphasised the need for cross-party cooperation in times of national emergency such as those justifying the existence of the National Government. The struggle between the two Liberal factions was naturally picked up in the national press. The St Ives contest was reported as the most likely of a spate of recent by-elections in every kind of constituency to distinguish itself from a pattern of steadfast support for the government. The report put some of this down to the character of Isaac Foot who it said was a strong candidate with a tactical ability that was truly Cromwellian.

== Result ==
The result was a narrow win, by just 210 votes, for Beechman, the National Government and the Liberal Nationals. Despite their great disappointment at such an agonising near-miss, the mainstream Liberal Party was immensely buoyed by the result. The party leader, Sir Archie Sinclair, believed St Ives and another good by-election performance by the Liberals at North Dorset on 13 July, represented a turning of the tide. Lord Crewe wrote to The Times expressing disappointment at the paper's failure to recognise the importance of the rise of the Liberal vote in a number of by-elections and the encouragement which such results were giving to the party faithful. These results did not however foretell an immediate Liberal revival as there were no Liberal by-election gains in the years leading up to the Second World War.

What the result did confirm however was that West country Labour voters would support an independent Liberal against a National candidate where their own party was not fighting, or had no realistic chance.

Cook and Ramsden, in their survey of British by-elections, conclude that the common theme of all by-elections in the 1930s was that many electors did not like the National Government's policies but they did not all object to the same things. But there was no clear pattern of voters consistently favouring the opposition Labour, let alone the independent Liberal, parties.

By 1937 the National Government had made progress on the economy and the unemployment. One source reported that the lowest unemployment figure on record since 1929 was reached on 21 June 1937, namely 1,356,598. This represented a decrease of 94,742 on the month and 346,076 in May 1936. Nearly all industries showed an improvement, among the most marked improvements being those affecting building and public works, the boot and shoe, iron, steel, textile and engineering industries, and agriculture. Against this background voters clearly felt happier with the devil they knew.

Beechman held the seat until 1950 when he stood down and was replaced by a National Liberal Conservative candidate. The National Liberal nomenclature was retained as late as the 1966 general election. The National Liberals merged with the Conservatives in 1968.

== Votes ==
St Ives by-election, 1937
Party	Candidate	Votes	%	±%
Liberal National	Alec Beechman	13,044	50.4	N/A
Liberal	Isaac Foot	12,834	49.6	New
Majority		210	0.8	N/A
Turnout		25,878	66.1	N/A
Liberal National hold		Swing		
