= Rose Hulse =

British businesswoman

Photo of Rose Hulse in her home in the West Country

Rose Hulse (née Adkins) is a Californian born British entrepreneur who was voted as one of the fifty most influential people working in the UK's OTT industry as the founder and CEO of TV streaming company, ScreenHits TV.

== Early life ==
Hulse grew up in Santa Monica, California. She is the daughter of Leon and Maxine Adkins and she has three siblings. She was a young classical musician and competitive figure skater. She attended University of Southern California and California State University, Northridge, where she received a B.S. in business administration.

== Career ==
Hulse began her career in politics, working for Los Angeles Mayor Richard Riordan in international trade. She then made a career shift to publishing and media, working for companies including Weider Publications, The Hollywood Reporter, NBC Universal, and Sundance Institute before launching her own company in 2012 and ventured into media tech and powered video distribution platforms for Turner Broadcasting (Warner Media) and provided services for IMG, Disney Latin America, Sony Pictures Television, and BBC Worldwide.

ScreenHits Limited, which spawned her current passion project ScreenHits TV, was described by Glamour Magazine as "a genius app that allows subscribers to integrate all their streaming platforms from Netflix to Britbox in one app." ScreenHits TV was named by Forbes as one of their "Black-Owned Businesses You Need to Know". ScreenHits TV is listed as one of the top 100 Media Tech Innovators in the UK by Business Cloud Magazine.

In 2023, Hulse's British company, ScreenHits, signed a deal with German car manufacturer, Porsche, to integrate ScreenHits TV, as the main Smart TV launcher into their vehicles, starting with the Cayenne in over 56 markets worldwide. The new service allows passengers to stream film and TV on built-in screens. The service provides customers with access to their subscriptions with the likes of Disney+ and Amazon Prime, as well as live TV via ScreenHits TV.

In 2017, Hulse became an ambassador for jewellery brand Tiffany & Co..

Hulse's career has been featured in Tatler, Hello Magazine, Grazia, The Hollywood Reporter, BBC Radio 4 Woman's Hour, and Glamour. She is a member of the International Academy of Arts and Sciences, and the British Screen Forum. She is also on the committee of the Television and Radio Industries Club (TRIC Awards). ScreenHits TV has raised funding from notable investors from the media and tech space and has recently been listed at the top of Variety's Silicon Valleywood Impact Report. Hulse was listed in 2021 as one of the top 50 professionals in Over-The-Top businesses for her work on Screenhits TV.

Hulse is also a board of trustees member for the Museum of the Home, appointed in 2023, and also sits on the Young Ambassadors Steering Committee for the National Gallery.

In 2025, Hulse won the Entrepreneur of the Year Award in the Senior Leaders category for the Black British Business Awards, which recognises the exceptional performance of black professionals and entrepreneurs across the UK, as well as leaders from prestigious global brands such as JPMorganChase, Goldman Sachs, Sephora, Dentsu Creative, and LinkedIn. In the same year, her business, ScreenHits TV, won Business of the Year award at the annual Black Powerlist, which brings together the most influential figures in British business, sports and entertainment, including Chris Eubank, Vanessa Williams, Afua Kyei and Idris Elba - who all came together on the red carpet for an evening of elegance, pride and celebration.

== Activism and politics ==
Hulse has spoken about racism, inequality and the challenges women of colour face in the tech world when raising finance in opinion pieces and interviews.

On 30 November 2023, Hulse was selected to stand as the Conservative Party prospective parliamentary candidate for Bristol North East, a new seat created by recent boundary changes that brings part of Chris Skidmore's seat of Kingswood into Bristol North East and parts of Filton and Bradley Stoke, which currently sit within Conservative MP's Jack Lopresti's seat.

She has spoken in support of affordable housing, in 2024 criticising the One Lockleaze development in Bristol, as unaffordable for local residents whose average household income is £27,600. In an interview with The Telegraph she argued that Bristol's house prices have risen by nearly ninety percent since 2014, the third highest such increase in the UK.

== Personal life ==
In 2017 she married George Richard Hulse, grandson of Sir Westrow Hamilton Hulse, 9th Baronet - whose family seat is Breamore House. The Hulse family has common origin with the Holles Earls of Clare. The wedding took place at St George's, Hanover Square, followed by a reception at Spencer House, Westminster, owned by the Spencer Family of the late Princess Diana.

In 2024, a portrait of Hulse was commissioned and painted by award-winning artist, Frances Bell. The portrait was exhibited at the 2025 Annual Exhibition of Royal Society of Portrait Painters at the Mall Galleries in London.

Hulse is involved with a number of charities and organisations in the United Kingdom and Kenya, where she supports youth programs that help to provide opportunities for disadvantage children. In 2024 she launched an initiative to bring 6 local communities together in Kenya for an annual Football tournament - which received positive feedback by the local government and community.

Hulse lives in London and the West Country with her husband and they have two daughters.
