= 1954 Harwich by-election =

1954 UK Parliamentary by-election

| ← 1951 | 11 February 1954 | 1955 → |

Harwich constituency
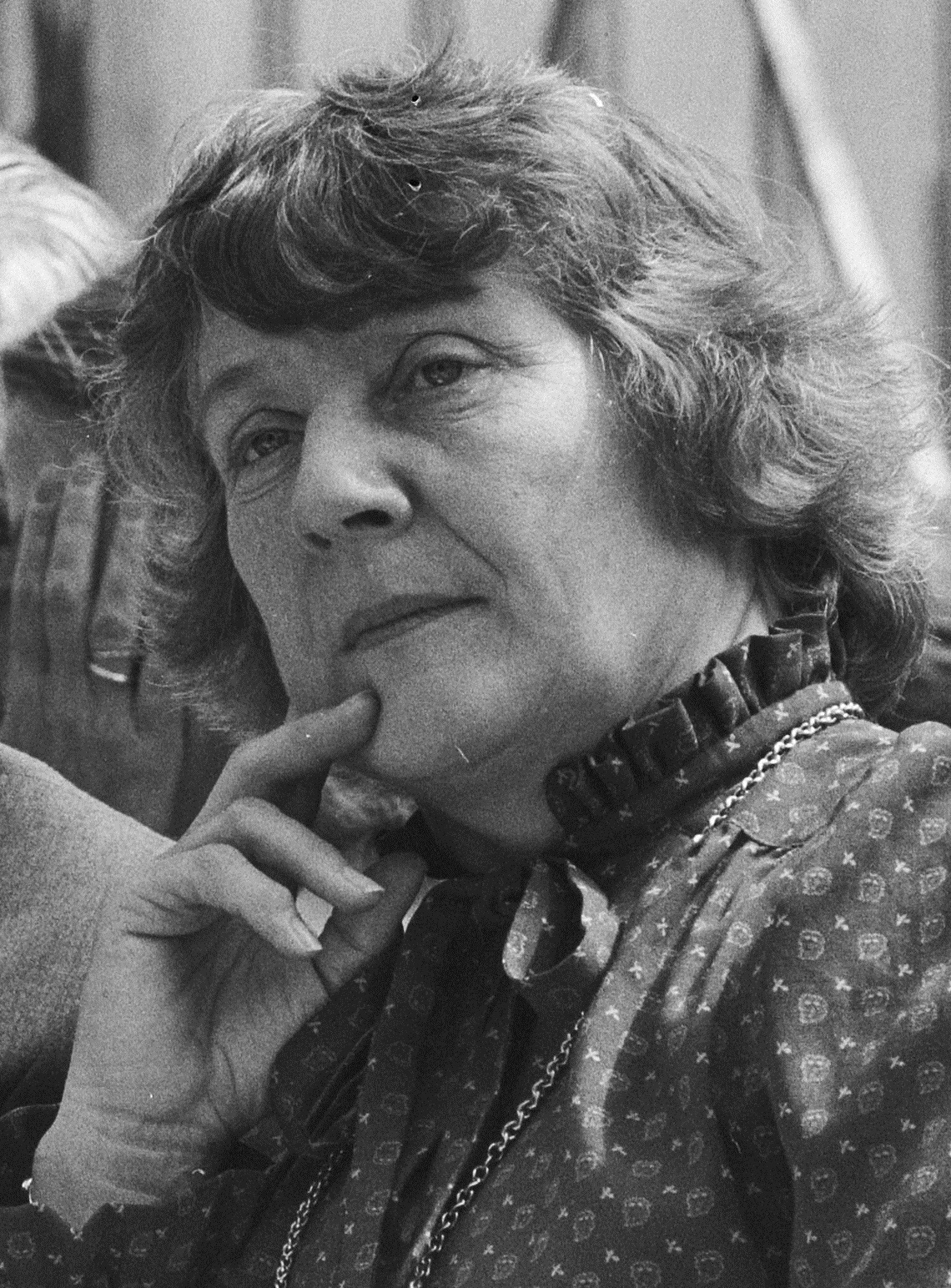
| | First party | Second party |
|---|---|---|
| Candidate | Julian Ridsdale | Shirley Catlin |
| Party | National Liberal | Labour |
| Popular vote | 19,532 | 13,535 |
| Percentage | 59.1% | 40.9% |
| Swing | ▲0.2% | ▼0.2% |
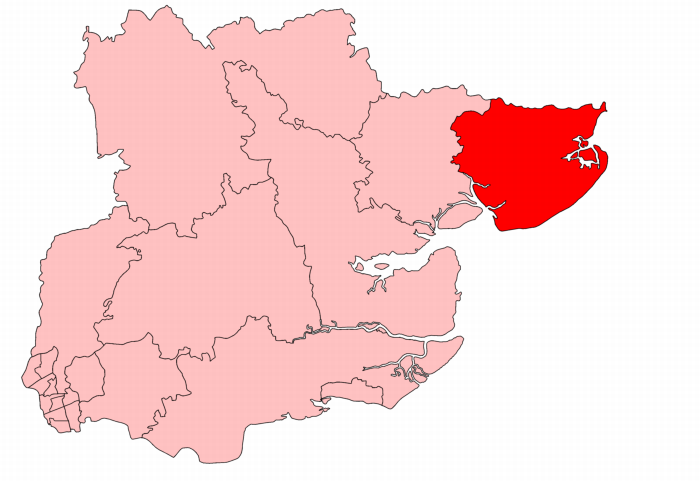
- Boundary of the Harwich constituency in Essex
MP before election
Stanley Holmes
National Liberal
Elected MP
Julian Ridsdale
National Liberal

The 1954 Harwich by-election was a parliamentary by-election held on 11 February 1954 for the British House of Commons constituency of Harwich.

== Background ==
=== Constituency ===
The seat consisted of the port town of Harwich, the seaside towns of Clacton-on-Sea, Brightlingsea, Frinton-on-Sea and Walton-on-the-Naze, and most of the primarily rural Tendring District.

=== Trigger ===
The seat had become vacant when the National Liberal Member of Parliament (MP) Stanley Holmes was elevated to the peerage as Baron Dovercourt, having held the seat since the 1935 general election.

== Candidates ==
=== National Liberal ===
The National Liberal party chose Julian Ridsdale, the nephew both of former Conservative Prime Minister Stanley Baldwin and Liberal MP Sir Aurelian Ridsdale as its candidate. He had contested Paddington North at the 1951 general election as the Conservative Party candidate.

=== Labour ===
In the autumn of 1952 the Harwich Labour party selected the 22 year old former chair of Oxford University Labour Club Shirley Catlin as its prospective candidate, after the only other candidate made it clear that he had no interest in running.

== Result ==
The Conservative and Liberal candidate, Julian Ridsdale held the seat for the government. He remained the constituency's MP until his retirement 38 years later at the 1992 general election. Shirley Catlin would later, under her married name Shirley Williams; be elected as MP for Hitchin and would serve in the Cabinets of Harold Wilson and James Callaghan.

1954 Harwich by-election
| Party | Candidate | Votes | % | ±% |
|---|---|---|---|---|
| National Liberal | Julian Ridsdale | 19,532 | 59.1 | +0.2 |
| Labour | Shirley Catlin | 13,535 | 40.9 | −0.2 |
| Majority | | 5,997 | 18.2 | +0.4 |
| Turnout | | 33,067 | | |
| National Liberal hold | | Swing | | |
