= 1962 Central Norfolk by-election =

UK Parliamentary by-election

The 1962 Central Norfolk by-election was held on 22 November 1962 after the death of the incumbent Conservative MP, Richard Collard. It was retained by the Conservative candidate Ian Gilmour.

Andrews was serving in the Armed Forces, and stood to avail of the automatic military discharge for Parliamentary candidates publicised by Malcolm Thompson at the Middlesbrough West by-election the previous July.

Central Norfolk by-election, 1962
Party	Candidate	Votes	%	±%
National Liberal	Ian Gilmour	13,268	37.7	−12.7
Labour	Geoffrey B L Bennett	13,048	37.0	+2.2
Liberal	Geoffrey Maxwell Goode	7,915	22.5	+7.7
Independent Liberal	Kenneth Coleman	909	2.5	New
Independent	J Andrews	79	0.2	New
Majority		220	0.7	−14.9
Turnout		35,217	60.2	−19.6
National Liberal hold		Swing	-7.5	
