= Iain Sproat =

British politician (1938–2011)

Minister for Sport
- In office 27 May 1993 – 1 May 1997
- Prime Minister: John Major
- Preceded by: Robert Key
- Succeeded by: Tony Banks

Member of Parliament for Harwich
- In office 9 April 1992 – 8 April 1997
- Preceded by: Julian Ridsdale
- Succeeded by: Ivan Henderson

Member of Parliament for Aberdeen South
- In office 18 June 1970 – 13 May 1983
- Preceded by: Donald Dewar
- Succeeded by: Gerry Malone

Personal details
- Born: 8 November 1938
- Died: 29 September 2011 (aged 72)
- Party: Conservative
- Spouse: Judith Mary Kernot (1979–2011)

Iain MacDonald Sproat (8 November 1938 – 29 September 2011) was a British Conservative Member of Parliament (MP). He was educated at Winchester College and Magdalen College, Oxford. He worked as a publisher and journalist.

== Parliamentary career ==
Sproat first contested Rutherglen in a by-election in May 1964, and again in the general election later that year, but was unsuccessful in both campaigns.

At the 1970 general election, he stood in the marginal Scottish constituency of Aberdeen South, and ousted the sitting Labour MP, Donald Dewar. He was re-elected there at three further elections, until the 1983 general election when he moved to contest Roxburgh and Berwickshire believing that this was a 'safer' seat. However, Aberdeen South was held by the Conservatives, while Roxburgh and Berwickshire fell to the Liberal candidate Archy Kirkwood.

Sproat returned to Parliament nine years later, moving to England and succeeding Sir Julian Ridsdale as MP for Harwich in the 1992 general election. He served as parliamentary secretary and then minister of state in the Department for National Heritage, where had responsibility for film, and then Minister for Sport in John Major's government from 1993 to 1997, but at the 1997 general election he was defeated by the Labour candidate Ivan Henderson. Sproat stood again in Harwich at the 2001 election, but Henderson was returned with an increased majority. Sproat did not contest the 2005 general election; instead Douglas Carswell regained the seat for the Conservatives.

== Outside Parliament ==
In 1979 he married Judith Mary Kernot, who survived him.

A lifelong cricket fan, in 1980 he was founder publisher of the Cricketers' Who's Who (Green Umbrella) which celebrated its 43rd anniversary in 2022.

A tireless campaigner to clear the name of his literary hero, P.G. Wodehouse, he secured Wodehouse's knighthood in 1975 and later wrote 'Wodehouse at War' (pub Milner & Co. Ltd. 1981) claiming the author's innocence regarding charges that he acted as a propagandist for Nazi Germany during World War II.

Parliament of the United Kingdom
Preceded by Donald Dewar	Member of Parliament for Aberdeen South; 1970–1983	Succeeded by Gerry Malone
Preceded by Sir Julian Ridsdale	Member of Parliament for Harwich; 1992–1997	Succeeded by Ivan Henderson
Political offices
Preceded by Robert Key	Minister for Sport; 1993–1997	Succeeded by Tony Banks
