= William Coldrick =

British politician

William Coldrick (20 January 1894 – 15 September 1975) was a Labour Co-operative politician in the United Kingdom.

He was elected as Member of Parliament for Bristol North at the 1945 general election. When that constituency was abolished in boundary changes for the 1950 general election, he was returned to Parliament for the new Bristol North East constituency. He was defeated at the 1959 general election by the Conservative and National Liberal candidate Alan Hopkins.

He was Chairman of the Co-operative Party from 1945 to 1955 and was Sheriff of Bristol in 1964. He was briefly in prison during the General Strike of 1926 with Arthur Jenkins, the father of Roy Jenkins. He died in 1975 aged 81.

Parliament of the United Kingdom
Preceded by Robert Hamilton Bernays	Member of Parliament for Bristol North; 1945–1950	Constituency abolished
New constituency	Member of Parliament for Bristol North East; 1950–1959	Succeeded by Alan Hopkins
Party political offices
Preceded by Alfred Barnes	Chair of the Co-operative Party; 1945–1955	Succeeded by Albert Ballard
