= Frank Medlicott =

Frank Medlicott

Brigadier Sir Frank Medlicott CBE (10 November 1903 – 9 January 1972) was a National Liberal Party and later Liberal Party politician in the United Kingdom.

He first stood for parliament as a Liberal, contesting Acton in 1929.

He was elected as a National Liberal member of parliament (MP) for East Norfolk at a by-election in 1939 after the National Liberal MP Viscount Elmley had succeeded to the peerage as the 8th Earl Beauchamp.

After the Woolton-Teviot agreement in 1947, The National Liberals and Conservative Party merged local party associations and fielded joint candidates. Many candidates, including Medlicott, described themselves as "Conservative and National Liberal", or other permutations of the two names.

When the East Norfolk constituency was abolished for the 1950 general election, Medlicott was elected as Conservative and National Liberal MP for Central Norfolk. In November 1956 Medlicott was a firm opponent of the Eden government's decision to invade the Suez Canal zone, but his stance was not supported by the Central Norfolk Conservative and National Liberal Association which passed a resolution dissociating themselves from the views of their MP.

On 1 May 1957 Medlicott announced that he would not contest the next election, writing to the association to tell them that he rejected their view that the Member of Parliament should do what party leaders tell him. In November 1957, Medlicott resigned the Conservative whip. He was invited to be the Liberal Party candidate for the constituency but declined, and in November 1958 he applied to receive the Conservative whip again (which was granted). Medlicott duly retired from the House of Commons at the 1959 election. He re-joined the Liberal Party, however, he did not stand again for election. From 1969 he served as the Liberal Party's National Treasurer.

== See also ==
- 1939 East Norfolk by-election

Parliament of the United Kingdom
Preceded by William Lygon, Viscount Elmley	Member of Parliament for East Norfolk; 1939 – 1950	Constituency abolished
New constituency	Member of Parliament for Central Norfolk; 1950 – 1959	Succeeded by Richard Collard
Party political offices
Preceded by John Pardoe	Treasurer of the Liberal Party; 1969–1972	Succeeded by Philip Watkins
