= Bristol North East =

UK Parliament constituency (1950–1983, 2024 onwards)

- Borough constituency for the House of Commons
- Interactive map of boundaries from 2024
- Boundary of Bristol North East in South West England
- Electorate: 69,793 (2023)

Current constituency
- Created: 2024
- Member of Parliament: Damien Egan (Labour)
- Seats: one
- Created from: Bristol East, Bristol North West, Kingswood and Filton and Bradley Stoke

1950–1983
- Created from: Bristol Central (part); Bristol East; Bristol North
- Replaced by: Bristol East; Bristol North West; Bristol West; Kingswood

Bristol North East is a borough constituency in the city of Bristol represented in the House of Commons of the UK Parliament since July 2024 by Damien Egan of the Labour Party. (Note: As with all constituencies, the constituency elects one Member of Parliament (MP) by the first past the post system of election at least every five years.) Egan had originally been elected at a byelection in February 2024 for the abolished constituency of Kingswood.

The constituency was originally created for the 1950 general election, and abolished for the 1983 general election.

The conduct of the 1951 election was the subject of an academic study, published as Straight Fight in 1954 by R. S. Milne and H.C Mackensie.

Further to the completion of the 2023 review of Westminster constituencies, the seat was re-established for the 2024 general election.

== Constituency profile ==
The Bristol North East constituency is located in South West England and covers parts of the city of Bristol and the neighbouring South Gloucestershire district. It is almost entirely suburban and includes the neighbourhoods of Kingswood, Staple Hill, Fishponds and Lockleaze. Bristol is a major port city and has a long history of trade, including the slave trade. The area around Kingswood is the site of Bristol Coalfield, making the area one of the few places in Southern England with a history of coal mining.

Compared to national averages, residents of the constituency are younger and have average levels of wealth, education and professional employment. The constituency's ethnic makeup is similar to the rest of the country; White people are 79% of the population. At the local council level, the areas close to the city centre are represented by Green Party councillors, whilst the east of the constituency elected entirely Labour Party candidates. Like the United Kingdom as a whole, an estimated 52% of voters in Bristol North East supported leaving the European Union at the 2016 referendum.

== Boundaries ==
=== 1950–1983 ===
1950–1955: The County Borough of Bristol wards of District, Eastville, Hillfields, and Stapleton.

1955–1974: The County Borough of Bristol wards of District, Eastville, Hillfields, and Stapleton, and the Urban District of Mangotsfield.

1974–1983: The County Borough of Bristol wards of Easton, Eastville, Hillfields, St Paul, St Philip and Jacob, and Stapleton.

=== 2024–present ===
The re-established constituency comprises the following areas:

- The Eastville, Frome Vale and Hillfields wards of the City of Bristol, transferred from Bristol East
- The Lockleaze ward of Bristol, transferred from Bristol North West
- The town of Kingswood, comprising the Kingswood, New Cheltenham and Woodstock wards of the District of South Gloucestershire, previously part of the constituency of Kingswood, which was abolished
- The Staple Hill and Mangotsfield ward of South Gloucestershire, transferred partly from Kingswood and partly from Filton and Bradley Stoke

== Members of Parliament ==
Election	Member	Party
1950	William Coldrick	Labour Co-operative
1959	Alan Hopkins	Conservative & National Liberal
1966	Raymond Dobson	Labour
1970	Robert Adley	Conservative
Feb 1974	Arthur Palmer	Labour Co-operative
1983	constituency abolished	
2024	Damien Egan	Labour

== Election results ==
=== Elections in the 2020s ===
General election 2024: Bristol North East
Party	Candidate	Votes	%	±%
Labour	Damien Egan	19,004	45.3	−5.0
Green	Lorraine Francis	7,837	18.7	+14.7
Conservative	Rose Hulse	6,216	14.8	−24.3
Reform	Anthony New	5,418	12.9	+11.4
Liberal Democrats	Louise Harris	1,964	4.7	−0.4
Independent	Asif Ali	1,029	2.5	N/A
TUSC	Dan Smart	399	1.0	N/A
SDP	Tommy Truman	122	0.3	N/A
Majority		11,167	26.6	+15.4
Turnout		41,989	59.9	−10.2
Registered electors		70,076		
Labour notional hold		Swing	−9.9	

Notional results are those of the 2019 election. There was a by-election in Kingswood, one of the preceding constituencies, in February 2024, resulting in a gain from the Conservatives by Egan. Labour also won Filton and Bradley Stoke, another of the successor constituencies of Kingswood, in the general election, in a notional gain from the Conservatives.

=== Notional 2019 result ===
2019 notional result
Party	Vote	%
Labour	24,598	50.3
Conservative	19,134	39.1
Liberal Democrats	2,494	5.1
Green	1,948	4.0
Brexit Party	731	1.5
Turnout	48,905	70.1
Electorate	69,793	

=== Elections in the 1970s ===
General election 1979: Bristol North East
Party	Candidate	Votes	%	±%
Labour Co-op	Arthur Palmer	19,337	51.6	−1.5
Conservative	M.E. Mulvany	13,685	36.5	+6.6
Liberal	N. Drinan	3,693	9.9	−7.1
Ecology	Gundula Dorey	469	1.3	N/A
National Front	K.D.C. Brown	320	0.9	N/A
Majority		5,652	15.1	−8.1
Turnout		37,604	73.5	+2.3
Labour Co-op hold		Swing		

- Constituency abolished 1983, and split between Bristol East, Bristol North West and Kingswood constituencies.

General election October 1974: Bristol North East
Party	Candidate	Votes	%	±%
Labour Co-op	Arthur Palmer	19,647	53.1	+5.7
Conservative	P.M.S. Hills	11,056	29.9	−2.0
Liberal	W. Watts-Miller	6,303	17.0	−3.7
Majority		8,591	23.2	+7.7
Turnout		37,006	71.2	−4.9
Labour Co-op hold		Swing	+3.9	

General election February 1974: Bristol North East
Party	Candidate	Votes	%	±%
Labour Co-op	Arthur Palmer	18,625	47.4	−2.1
Conservative	R.H.F. Cox	12,538	31.9	−18.6
Liberal	W. Watts-Miller	8,127	20.7	N/A
Majority		6,087	15.5	N/A
Turnout		39,290	76.1	+4.0
Labour Co-op gain from Conservative		Swing		

General election 1970: Bristol North East
Party	Candidate	Votes	%	±%
Conservative	Robert Adley	23,254	50.5	+4.7
Labour	Raymond Dobson	22,792	49.5	−4.7
Majority		462	1.0	N/A
Turnout		46,046	72.1	−5.0
Conservative gain from Labour		Swing		

=== Elections in the 1960s ===
General election 1966: Bristol North East
Party	Candidate	Votes	%	±%
Labour	Raymond Dobson	25,699	54.2	+10.0
National Liberal	Alan Hopkins	21,727	45.8	−0.9
Majority		3,972	8.4	N/A
Turnout		47,426	77.1	0.0
Labour gain from National Liberal		Swing		

General election 1964: Bristol North East
Party	Candidate	Votes	%	±%
National Liberal	Alan Hopkins	22,423	46.7	−1.0
Labour	Raymond Dobson	21,212	44.2	+1.8
Independent Liberal	Alice M Pearce	4,346	9.1	N/A
Majority		1,211	2.5	−2.8
Turnout		47,981	77.1	−2.0
National Liberal hold		Swing		

=== Elections in the 1950s ===
General election 1959: Bristol North East
Party	Candidate	Votes	%	±%
National Liberal	Alan Hopkins	24,258	47.7	+2.9
Labour Co-op	William Coldrick	21,574	42.4	−4.2
Liberal	Alice M Pearce	5,030	9.9	+1.2
Majority		2,684	5.3	N/A
Turnout		50,862	79.1	+1.1
National Liberal gain from Labour Co-op		Swing		

General election 1955: Bristol North East
Party	Candidate	Votes	%	±%
Labour Co-op	William Coldrick	22,740	46.6	−6.6
National Liberal	David WE Webster	21,864	44.8	−2.2
Liberal	George W. Stevenson	4,236	8.7	N/A
Majority		876	1.8	−4.2
Turnout		48,840	78.0	−4.8
Labour Co-op hold		Swing		

General election 1951: Bristol North East
Party	Candidate	Votes	%	±%
Labour Co-op	William Coldrick	21,910	53.0	+3.6
National Liberal	George Nixon-Eckersall	19,410	47.0	+8.1
Majority		2,500	6.0	−4.5
Turnout		41,320	82.8	−1.6
Labour Co-op hold		Swing		

General election 1950: Bristol North East
Party	Candidate	Votes	%	±%
Labour Co-op	William Coldrick	20,456	49.4	
National Liberal	Violet Bathurst	16,082	38.9	
Liberal	Isla Gwyn Woodcock	4,848	11.7	
Majority		4,374	10.5	
Turnout		41,386	84.4	
Labour Co-op win (new seat)				
