= Thomas Magnay =

British politician (1876–1949)

Thomas Magnay (14 September 1876 – 3 November 1949) was a Liberal Party politician in the United Kingdom, who joined the breakaway Liberal National faction and served as a member of parliament (MP) from 1931 to 1945.

He unsuccessfully contested the 1929 general election as a Liberal Party candidate in the Blaydon constituency in County Durham.

When the Liberal Party divided in 1931 over whether to support Ramsay MacDonald's National Government if it adopted protection, Magnay joined the pro-tariff Liberal National faction. At the 1931 general election he was elected as MP for Gateshead, a previously safe seat for the Labour Party, but where two Labour MPs had died that year. He defeated the influential union leader Ernest Bevin, who was the Labour candidate. He held the Gateshead seat until his defeat at the 1945 general election by the left-wing Labour candidate Konni Zilliacus.

Parliament of the United Kingdom
| Preceded by Herbert Evans | Member of Parliament for Gateshead; 1931–1945 | Succeeded by Konni Zilliacus |
