= William Lygon, 8th Earl Beauchamp =

British noble & politician (1903–1979)

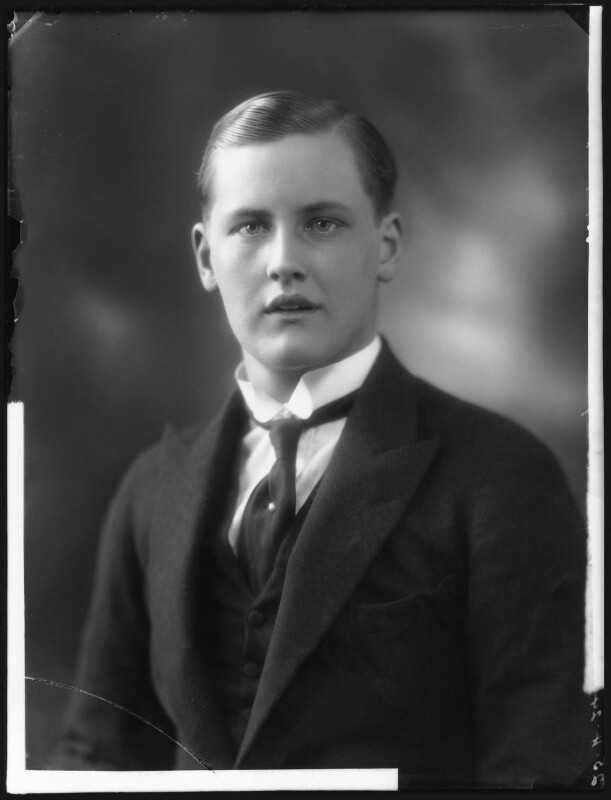
Viscount Elmley in 1924

William Lygon, 8th Earl Beauchamp, OStJ, JP, DL (3 July 1903 – 3 January 1979), styled as Viscount Elmley until 1938, was a politician in the United Kingdom. The eldest son of the controversial William Lygon, 7th Earl Beauchamp, sometime leader of the Liberals in the House of Lords, he was a Member of Parliament (MP) for East Norfolk before in 1938 inheriting his father's seat in the House of Lords. He remained a member there until his death.

== Political career ==
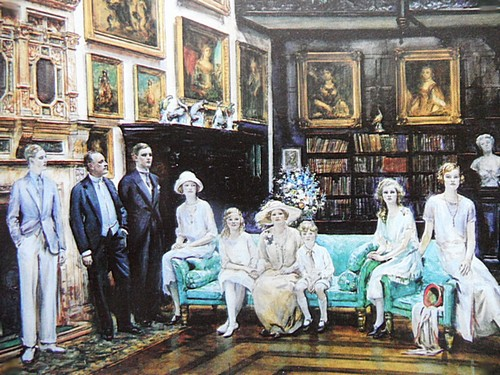
Earl Beauchamp and his family at Madresfield c. 1925, by William Ranken

Standing as a Liberal, Lygon was elected as Member of Parliament for East Norfolk at the 1929 general election. At the 1931 general election, when the Liberal Party split over participation in Ramsay MacDonald's National Government, he stood and was elected in the interest of the breakaway Liberal National grouping (known as National Liberal after 1948). This faction aligned itself with the National Government – even after the official Liberals (termed "Samuelites" after their leader Herbert Samuel) crossed the floor into opposition in 1932 – and eventually (in 1968) merged with the Conservative Party.

Lygon, known in the House of Commons by his courtesy title of Viscount Elmley, retained his seat as a Liberal National in the 1935 general election. He succeeded to the peerage as the Earl Beauchamp on his father's death in 1938. At his own death without male issue in 1979, his peerages became extinct.

== Personal life ==
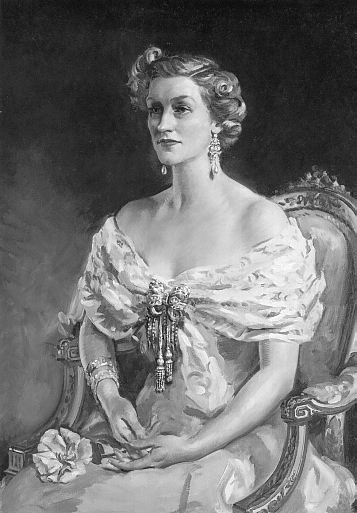
Countess Beauchamp, c. 1938, by William Bruce Ellis Ranken

On 16 June 1936, Lygon married Else "Mona" Schiwe (1895–1989), a daughter of Viggo Schiwe, a Danish character actor, and former wife of Peter Christian Blicher Dornonville de la Cour (d. 1924). Beauchamp had no issue of his own by this marriage, but he gained a stepdaughter, Agnete Regitze Dornonville de la Cour (1916–2010).

At one time, Lygon lived in the disused Winterton Lighthouse in Winterton-on-Sea, Norfolk, a village in his parliamentary constituency. After succeeding his father as the Earl Beauchamp in 1938, he and his wife made their home at Madresfield Court, Worcestershire, the ancestral seat of the Earls Beauchamp.

== Honours ==
29 June 1948: Officer of the Most Venerable Order of the Hospital of Saint John of Jerusalem

== In popular culture ==
Lygon is sometimes said to have been the model for the character of Lord Brideshead ("Bridey"), eldest son of the Marquess of Marchmain, in Evelyn Waugh's novel Brideshead Revisited, perhaps because both were heirs to ancient families and married older wives, and both had eccentric fathers. As a result, he was the last Earl Beauchamp. Lygon's father has been cited as the model for Lord Marchmain, the father of "Bridey".

Parliament of the United Kingdom
Preceded by Sir Reginald Neville	Member of Parliament for East Norfolk; 1929–1938	Succeeded by Frank Medlicott
Peerage of the United Kingdom
Preceded by William Lygon	Earl Beauchamp; 1938–1979	Extinct
