= Julian Ridsdale =

British politician (1915–2004)

Sir Julian Ridsdale CBE

Member of Parliament for Harwich
- In office 11 February 1954 – 16 March 1992
- Preceded by: Stanley Holmes
- Succeeded by: Iain Sproat

Personal details
- Born: Julian Errington Ridsdale; 8 June 1915
- Died: 21 July 2004 (aged 89)
- Party: Conservative
- Other political affiliations: National Liberal
- Spouse: Paddy Bennett (m. 1942)
- Relatives: Aurelian Ridsdale (uncle); Stanley Baldwin (uncle)
- Education: Tonbridge School; Royal Military College, Sandhurst

Military service
- Allegiance: United Kingdom
- Branch/service: British Army
- Rank: Major
- Unit: Royal Norfolk Regiment

Sir Julian Errington Ridsdale CBE (8 June 1915 – 21 July 2004) was a British National Liberal and later Conservative politician and long-serving Member of Parliament (MP) for Harwich. He took a particular interest in Japan.

The son of a stockbroker and nephew both of former Conservative Prime Minister Stanley Baldwin and Liberal MP Sir Aurelian Ridsdale, he was educated at Tonbridge School and at the Royal Military College, Sandhurst. After being commissioned as an officer into the Royal Norfolk Regiment, he studied Japanese at the School of Oriental and African Studies and during the war was a military intelligence officer specialising in Japan, rising to the rank of Major.

After the war, he ran a fruit farm in Sussex. His wife Victoire Evelyn Patricia "Paddy" Bennett, whom he married in 1942, was then secretary to the writer Ian Fleming. She is reported to have been a model for the character "Miss Moneypenny", secretary to James Bond. She was her husband's secretary and chairman of the Conservative MPs' Wives, and was awarded the DBE in 1991.

== Electoral history ==
At the 1951 snap general election, Ridsdale stood as the Conservative Party candidate in the London seat of Paddington North, but lost to the sitting Labour MP William Field.

In 1954, the National Liberal MP for Harwich, Sir Stanley Holmes was elevated to the peerage as Baron Dovercourt, and Ridsdale was selected as 'Conservative and Liberal' candidate to contest the consequent by-election. He was elected on 11 February 1954, defeating Labour's Miss Shirley Catlin (later Shirley Williams, fighting her first election), and he served for nearly forty years, being re-elected at nine general elections: 1955, 1959, 1964, 1966, 1970, February 1974, October 1974, 1979, 1983 and 1987. Ridsdale stood down at the 1992 general election, and was succeeded by the Conservative Iain Sproat.

== Parliamentary career ==
After supporting Prime Minister Anthony Eden during the 1956 invasion of Suez, Ridsdale served from 1957 to 1958 as the Parliamentary Private Secretary (PPS) to John Profumo, the Parliamentary Under-Secretary of State for the Colonies. From 1958 to 1960 he was PPS to the Minister of State for Foreign Affairs. His ministerial career was brief, as Parliamentary Under-Secretary of State for Air from 1962 to 1964.

Returning to the backbenches, he continued to mark himself as traditional rightwing Conservative, opposing tax increases and supporting capital punishment. In 1968, he supported Enoch Powell after Powell's controversial anti-immigration "Rivers of Blood speech", calling him "the Winston Churchill of today".

Retaining his wartime interest in Japan, Ridsdale concentrated on improving Anglo-Japanese relations and developing trade links. He was Chairman of the British Japanese Parliamentary Group from 1964 to 1992 and the leader of successive Parliamentary delegations to Japan. He was also Member of the North Atlantic Assembly from 1979 to 1992.

He received the CBE in 1977 and was knighted in 1981.

Parliament of the United Kingdom
Preceded by Sir Stanley Holmes	Member of Parliament for Harwich; 1954–1992	Succeeded by Iain Sproat
