= Alan Hopkins =

British politician (1926–2012)

Alan Cripps Nind Hopkins (27 October 1926 – 12 November 2012) was a British Conservative and National Liberal politician. He was educated at Winchester College, King's College, Cambridge and Yale University Law School. He then became a barrister at the Inner Temple.

At the 1959 general election, he was elected as the Member of Parliament (MP) for Bristol North East, defeating the Labour Co-operative MP William Coldrick. Hopkins was re-elected in 1964, but at the 1966 general election he was beaten by the Labour Party candidate Raymond Dobson. He then followed a managerial career in the engineering industry. He was twice married and had three sons.

Parliament of the United Kingdom
| Preceded by William Coldrick | Member of Parliament for Bristol North East; 1959–1966 | Succeeded by Raymond Dobson |
