= Richard Collard =

British politician (1911–1962)

Group captain Richard Charles Marler Collard DSO DFC MP
- Collard in 1960
- Born: 25 August 1911
- Died: 9 August 1962 (aged 50); Reepham, Norfolk, England
- Burial place: Reepham, Norfolk, England
- Spouse: Suzette Collard
- Children: 1
- Military career
- Allegiance: United Kingdom
- Branch: Royal Air Force
- Service years: 1939-1953
- Rank: Group captain
- Awards: Distinguished Service Order; Distinguished Flying Cross
- Other work: Member of Parliament

Group Captain Richard Charles Marler Collard DSO DFC (25 August 1911 – 9 August 1962) was a British Royal Air Force officer and politician. His sudden death at the age of 50 occurred less than three years after he was first elected to the House of Commons.

== Joining the RAF ==
Collard was the son of a stockbroker, and was educated at Haileybury and Imperial Service College. On leaving school he was commissioned into the Royal Air Force. Serving with No. 4 Squadron and No. 615 Squadron, he then became a flying instructor. He also played Rugby in the RAF first team.

== Wartime service ==
At the outbreak of war in 1939, Collard joined the Advanced Air Striking Force which was based in France. After the withdrawal from France, he transferred to Bomber Command for a while, and then to the Middle East in command of No. 37 Squadron and then No. 12 Squadron stationed at Binbrook, Lincolnshire. In 1941, he was awarded the Distinguished Flying Cross and in 1942, he received the Distinguished Service Order. He also received the King Haakon V11 Freedom Cross for the help he gave Norwegian prisoners of war.

== Post-war ==
During a bomber raid on Duisburg in 1942, Collard was shot down and taken prisoner by the Germans. He was imprisoned in Stalag Luft 3 and then Stalag 3a where he was Senior British Officer. He remaining there until the end of the war when the camp was liberated by the Russians. He then rejoined the RAF. In 1946, he commanded the Avro Lancaster goodwill tour of the United States, and became commander of RAF Stradishall in Suffolk until 1948. He spent the next year in charge of development at the Central Bomber Establishment. He was then posted to the middle east to serve as Group Captain Operations in 1950, and from 1951 he was Group Captain Operations for RAF Coastal Command until he retired from the RAF in 1953.

== Politics ==
On leaving the RAF, Collard joined the Handley Page Aircraft Company, and became a Director in May 1958. He also became involved in politics, and in November 1957 he was chosen to follow Brigadier Sir Frank Medlicott as Conservative Party candidate for Central Norfolk for the next general election; Medlicott was in dispute with his Association over the Suez crisis, and had resigned the Conservative whip. At the 1959 general election, Collard found himself in an energetic contest with the Liberal candidate, Maxwell Goode; however, Collard won with an increased majority of nearly 7,000 and Goode came third.

== Parliamentary contributions ==
His Parliamentary speeches concentrated on RAF and aviation issues. He also took up farming issues, based on his mostly agricultural constituency. In March 1960 he appealed to Members of Parliament who visited British forces' bases in foreign countries to think about what they reported about the morale of the servicemen. He defended the government's decision to abandon the Blue Streak missile and buy the American Skybolt.

Collard was ill in June 1961 and was advised to rest for two months. He did return to Parliament and in July 1962 objected to noise abatement rules and their effects on airlines, arguing that aircraft took off at the maximum load and the pilots should not be distracted by other considerations. However, in the middle of August he was found dead at his home in Whitwell.

His brother Peter, whom he trained to fly and was also awarded the DFC, was shot down and killed in his Hurricane serving with 615 Squadron in the Battle of Britain. Peter Collard has a road named after him in Kenley Surrey, adjacent to the former site of RAF Kenley.

Parliament of the United Kingdom
Preceded by Sir Frank Medlicott	Member of Parliament for Central Norfolk; 1959–1962	Succeeded by Ian Gilmour
