= Alec Beechman =

British politician (1896–1965)

Nevil Alexander Beechman MC KC (5 August 1896 – 6 November 1965) was a British barrister and Liberal politician who was Liberal National MP for St Ives from a 1937 by-election until 1950.

== Family and education ==
Alec Beechman was the only surviving son of Mr N. C. and Mrs Emily Beechman. He was educated at Westminster School where he was King's Scholar and princeps oppidanorum (head boy). He then studied at Balliol College, Oxford, where he was Domus Exhibitioner in Classics.

In 1953 he married Mrs Mary Gwendolyn Caradoc Williams, the widow of Captain Garth Caradoc Williams, RE.

== Career ==
During the First World War Beechman was commissioned in the British Army as a second lieutenant in May 1915 at the age of eighteen. He served in France and Belgium with the East Surrey Regiment, winning the Military Cross in 1917 in the same week as he celebrated his 21st birthday. He became a captain in 1917 and received nine wounds in fifteen minutes at Passchendaele. He subsequently became an instructor of officer cadets.

For his professional career Beechman went in for the law and in 1923 he was called to the Bar at the Inner Temple. He was created King's Counsel in 1947. In building up his practice he was said to have concentrated on economic and social questions.

== Politics ==
Beecham was a Liberal. After the war he returned to the University of Oxford. He was president of the Oxford Union in Hilary term of 1921 and was the first post-war chairman of the Oxford University Liberal Club in 1919–1920. In 1922 Beechman also served as chairman of the Union of University Liberal Societies.

In 1919 Beechman was a co-founder of the political publication Oxford Outlook, a left-leaning magazine whose main protagonist was the later author and journalist Beverley Nichols.

The Oxford University Liberal Club suffered a decline during the First World War. Many undergraduates went off to fight and many Liberals found the approach of their party in government decidedly illiberal, especially after the coming to power in December 1916 of the Lloyd George Coalition government and the much closer relationship this meant with the Conservatives. One of those engaged in its revival after the war was Gilbert Murray, Professor of Greek and who Beechman, as a Liberal and classics scholar, must have encountered and respected. The Club which Gilbert helped revive and of which Beechman became the first president was made in Gilbert's ideological image and endorsed the Asquithian Liberals, that is those in the party who distanced themselves from the supporters of Lloyd George and collaboration with the Tories. The new Club was indeed inaugurated by Asquith himself. This is interesting in the light of Beechman's later political journey into the National Liberals and that party's relationship with the Conservatives.

In 1931 Beechman was nominated as Liberal candidate for Oldham but in the event the party chose not to contest the seat in the context of the 1931 general election after the formation of the National Government which it at first supported.

However at some point between 1931 and 1935, Beechman broke with the mainstream Liberal Party and began to support that section of the party led by Sir John Simon which continued to be part of the National Government when the orthodox Liberals under Herbert Samuel broke with the government over the traditional policy of Free trade after the Ottawa agreements of 1932. He did not contest a seat at the 1935 general election but in 1937 he was chosen as Liberal National candidate to fight the by-election at St Ives in Cornwall when the seat fell vacant with the elevation to the peerage of the sitting MP Walter Runciman. In a hard-fought contest against former Liberal MP Isaac Foot, Beechman held the seat by just 210 votes (or 0.8% of the poll.)

During the Japanese invasion of China in 1937, Beechman opposed British intervention, saying that he would rather resign or "go back to the trenches myself" than support a war.

Despite the growing link between the Liberal Nationals and the Conservatives, Beechman remained at heart a Liberal and saw collaboration with the Conservatives as essentially an anti-socialist front. He stood at the 1945 general election as a National Liberal albeit without Conservative opposition and remained MP for St Ives until he stood down at the 1950 general election. According to one historian of Liberal politics in the South West of England, the Liberal Nationals were looking to distance themselves from their Conservative allies after the 1945 general election and he names Beechman and George Lambert the MP for South Molton in Devon as two Liberal Nationals who were likely to favour a new Centre grouping of reunited Liberals, Conservative reformers and the right wing of the Labour Party.

In December 1949, Beechman announced he would retire at the 1950 general election due to ill-health from pneumonia. After he stood down St Ives continued to return National Liberals against Labour and Liberal Party opposition until the Conservatives formally absorbed the National Liberals in 1968.

== Honours and appointments ==
Beechman served as a member of the Select Committee on National Expenditure (Naval Services sub-committee). He was a Parliamentary Private Secretary (PPS) to the Minister of Overseas Trade, PPS to the Under-Secretary of State at the Dominions Office in 1940 and to the Minister of Health in 1942–45. From 1943 to 1945 he was a Lord Commissioner of the Treasury, i.e. an assistant government whip and he served as Chief Whip to the Liberal National Party from 1942 to 1945.

Beechman continued to live in St Ives after retirement from the House of Commons in a flat overlooking the harbour. From 1957 to 1965 he served on the town council.

Parliament of the United Kingdom
Preceded by Walter Runciman	Member of Parliament for St Ives; 1937–1950	Succeeded by Greville Howard
