= James Henderson-Stewart =

British politician

Sir James Henderson-Stewart Bt MP

Chairman of the National Liberal Party
- In office 1959–1961
- Preceded by: James Duncan
- Succeeded by: Colin Thornton-Kemsley
- In office 1945–1946
- Preceded by: Ernest Brown
- Succeeded by: Stanley Holmes

Under-Secretary of State for Scotland
- In office 4 February 1952 – 9 January 1957
- Succeeded by: John Hope

Member of Parliament for East Fife
- In office 2 February 1933 – 3 September 1961
- Preceded by: Sir James Duncan Millar
- Succeeded by: John Gilmour

Personal details
- Born: 6 December 1897 Crieff, Perthshire, United Kingdom
- Died: 3 September 1961 (aged 63)
- Party: Liberal; Liberal National
- Education: University of Edinburgh

Sir James Henderson-Stewart, 1st Baronet (6 December 1897 – 3 September 1961), born James Henderson Stewart, was a British banker, Army officer and politician. He was a National Liberal Member of Parliament for East Fife from 1933 until his death, and was the sessional chairman of the Parliamentary Party in 1945. He played an important role in negotiating the unity of the National Liberals with the Conservatives, but was unable to persuade the Liberal Party to join as well.

== Early life ==
Henderson-Stewart was born at Crieff, Perthshire, the son of Matthew Stewart. He attended Morrison's Academy in the town, interrupting his education to join the Royal Artillery and serve in the First World War. Promoted to Acting Captain in February 1918, he was wounded in action. He left the Army in 1919, placed as a Captain on the Reserve of Officers, and went to the University of Edinburgh where he obtained a Bachelor of Commerce degree in 1922 and a Master of Arts degree in economics in 1923. He was in the Territorial Army from 1921 to 1925.

== Liberal Party candidacies ==
At the 1923 general election Stewart was Liberal Party candidate for Leicester East, but finished in third place with only 27% of the vote. In the 1924 general election he fought Derby as the sole Liberal candidate, opposing J. H. Thomas who was a senior Labour Minister. His task was reckoned "a difficult one" and he again finished bottom of the poll.

During the 1920s Henderson-Stewart worked at the British Overseas Bank in London. His political activity occurred through the Land and Nation League, a Liberal body which had been set up to promote the land policy which was being promoted by David Lloyd George. By 1929, he was Secretary of the League, and he was selected as the Liberal candidate for Dundee.

Like Derby this was a two-member constituency but unlike Derby the Conservatives nominated only one candidate, and it was recognised that Liberal and Conservative voters (each of whom had two votes) would use their second vote for the other party's candidate. Henderson-Stewart finished as runner-up, some 13,712 votes from winning a seat but having put in a creditable performance.

== East Fife election ==
In January 1933, Henderson-Stewart was adopted as Liberal National candidate for East Fife, where the death of the sitting Member of Parliament Sir James Duncan Millar had precipitated a by-election. He obtained the support of the Unionists, although he faced opposition not only from the Labour Party and the Scottish National Party but also the Agricultural Party (whose candidate proclaimed himself a Conservative) and an unofficial Liberal who supported free trade. Lord Snowden, the former Labour Chancellor, sent a message of support to the unofficial Liberal, which Henderson-Stewart described as "little more than an ill-natured outburst",

== Member of Parliament ==
Henderson-Stewart won with a comfortable majority of 9,135, and in his victory speech attacked the "wrecking tactics" of the Agricultural and unofficial Liberal candidates. He gained a reputation for diligent constituency work, among the farmers and fishermen of Fife, and soon after his election opposed a reduction in the grant to the Forestry Commission which he considered a false economy. He often spoke on economic questions. On foreign affairs, he spoke in 1934 in favour of the United Kingdom staying out of any conflict between France and Germany; that July he stated that the innermost chamber of world peace lay in Anglo-American friendship.

== Foreign affairs ==
In the summer of 1935, Henderson-Stewart went on a tour of European horse markets, and on his return wrote a pamphlet entitled "Stop the Export of Butchery Horses" which called for a legal ban on the export trade. In July 1938, Henderson-Stewart was vice-chairman of the Empire Development Conference which was held at the Empire Exhibition in Glasgow.

In December 1938, Henderson-Stewart called for a determined and comprehensive approach to rearmament, and regretted that the Government had proclaimed its approach as limited. In March 1939 he was a co-signatory of a Parliamentary motion put forward by Anthony Eden and Winston Churchill which called for a National government "on the widest possible basis" to enable Britain to put forward its maximum military effort; the motion was not welcomed by the Chamberlain government.

== Second World War ==
Before the outbreak of war, Henderson-Stewart sought to ensure that the system of National Service in the armed services worked smoothly; in November 1939, he criticised the operation of the scheme in calling up agricultural workers when the government was calling for farmers to plough more land. In the Norway Debate of May 1940, Henderson Stewart voted against Chamberlain. After Churchill took over as prime minister, Henderson-Stewart enlisted again in the Royal Artillery in which he served from September 1940 to June 1941.

Henderson-Stewart was made the Scottish Whip for the Liberal Nationals in December 1942. In the spring of 1944 he went with a Parliamentary delegation to the West Indies to look at conditions there; on his return he said he had found "a blazing loyalty" to the Empire. In October 1944 he voted against the Government on the issue of compensation for landowners for adverse planning decisions.

== Liberal unity ==
With the Liberal candidates again divided between the Liberal Nationals and Opposition Liberals in the 1945 general election, Henderson-Stewart sought a reunification, without success. When Parliament reassembled after the election, Henderson-Stewart was chosen as the Chairman of the Liberal National Parliamentary Party for the session. This made him unofficial party leader; however he served only for one year. In September 1947 he wrote to The Times suggesting that the Liberal Party should consider merging with the Conservatives, arguing that Liberalism "stands four square in opposition to Socialism" and should work together with Churchill. Shortly after, Henderson-Stewart's group formally joined with the Conservatives.

At the 1950 general election, the Liberal Party nominated David Alexander Freeman a 22-year-old student at St Andrews University as a candidate against Henderson-Stewart, the first time they put a candidate up against him, and the controversy between them was described as "bitter". Henderson-Stewart increased his majority while the Liberal lost his deposit. In the new Parliament he kept up his campaign for the local fishing industry, calling for immediate action to prevent a crisis. He wanted controls on fish imports.

== Ministerial office ==
The Conservatives' return to power in 1951 led to Henderson-Stewart's appointment as Joint Parliamentary Under-Secretary of State at the Scottish Office in February 1952. Among his responsibilities were the fishing industry. In August of that year he was invited to speak to the European Youth Conference in Midlothian, at which he declared that "the mother country of a great Commonwealth and Empire" could not surrender vital elements of sovereignty. In December 1952, Henderson-Stewart was accused of lying by the Labour MP John Rankin, angry that the Government Chief Whip had closed the debate after Henderson-Stewart had spoken.

As the Minister responsible for the Scottish Education Department, Henderson-Stewart tried to encourage Scottish parents to keep their children in school long enough to sit the Leaving Certificate. He also dealt with the early stages of the dispute between the United Kingdom and Iceland over fishing rights, when an agreement was made by which the Icelandic government agreed not to try to extend its four-mile limit. He was also involved in a proposal for a River Forth tunnel, which he described as a brilliant idea but unsuited to the physical conditions.

== Baronetcy ==
Henderson-Stewart left the Government when Harold Macmillan became prime minister, although he was made a Baronet simultaneously. He was created Baronet of Callumshill in the County of Perth on 28 March 1957; the Court of the Lord Lyon granted a warrant allowing him to change his surname to Henderson-Stewart (and by Deed Poll).

== University appeal ==
In September 1957 Henderson-Stewart denounced Frank Cousins of the Transport and General Workers' Union as "just another demagogue playing for power" when Cousins declared his opposition to wage restraint. He became chairman of the Appeal Committee for St Leonards and St Katherine's Schools in St Andrews. He was also elected Chairman of the Scottish Unionist Members Committee in November 1960. Henderson-Stewart died suddenly in Dundee in September 1961.

== Sources ==
- "Sir J. Henderson-Stewart" (Obituary), The Times, 4 September 1961.
- "Who Was Who", A & C Black
- M. Stenton and S. Lees, "Who's Who of British MPs" Vol. IV (Harvester Press, 1981)

Party political offices
Preceded by Ernest Brown	Chairman of the Liberal National Party; 1945–1946	Succeeded by Stanley Holmes
Preceded by James Duncan	Chairman of the National Liberal Party; 1959–1961	Succeeded by Colin Thornton-Kemsley
Parliament of the United Kingdom
Preceded by Sir James Duncan Millar	Member of Parliament for East Fife; 1933 – 1961	Succeeded by Sir John Gilmour
Political offices
Preceded by New post	Under-Secretary of State for Scotland; 1952 – 1957; With: Thomas Galbraith 1952–1955; William McNair Snadden 1952–1955; Jack Browne 1955–1957; Niall Macpherson 1955–1957	Succeeded by Lord John Hope
Baronetage of the United Kingdom
New creation	Baronet (of Callumshill); 1957–1961	Succeeded by David Henderson-Stewart
