= Stanley Holmes, 1st Baron Dovercourt =

British politician

The Right Honourable The Lord Dovercourt

Chairman of the National Liberal Party
- In office 1946–1947
- Preceded by: James Henderson-Stewart
- Succeeded by: John Maclay

Member of Parliament for Harwich
- In office 14 November 1935 – 18 January 1954
- Preceded by: John Pybus
- Succeeded by: Julian Ridsdale

Member of Parliament for North East Derbyshire
- In office 14 December 1918 – 26 October 1922
- Preceded by: George Robert Harland Bowden
- Succeeded by: Frank Lee

Personal details
- Born: Joseph Stanley Holmes; 31 October 1878 Marylebone, Middlesex
- Died: 22 April 1961 (aged 82) Marylebone, London
- Party: National Liberal
- Other political affiliations: Liberal
- Spouse: Eva Gertrude
- Education: City of London School

Joseph Stanley Holmes, 1st Baron Dovercourt (31 October 1878 – 22 April 1961) was a British chartered accountant, businessman and Liberal Party politician, who later served as a Liberal National Member of Parliament.

== Background and education ==
Holmes was born in Marylebone, Middlesex, the son of Horace G. Holmes, JP. He was educated at the City of London School.

== Career ==
Holmes was a chartered accountant and company director. He served as vice-president of the Building Societies Association and was a member of the London County Council 1910 to 1919. He was elected Liberal Member of Parliament for North East Derbyshire at the 1918 general election, but narrowly lost the seat at the 1922 general election. The initially declared majority was only 5 votes, and an electoral petition was lodged. The petition was dismissed when a recount found a higher majority of 15.

Holmes then stood unsuccessfully in Dunbartonshire at the 1923 general election, and in Cheltenham at the 1924 election. He finally returned to the House of Commons after a thirteen-year absence at the 1935 general election, when he was elected for Harwich as a Liberal National. He held the seat until 1954, sitting later as a 'National Liberal and Conservative'. He introduced as Private Member's Bills the Inheritance (Family Provision) Act 1938 and the Coast Protection Act 1939. On 18 January 1954 he was elevated to the peerage as Baron Dovercourt, of Harwich in the County of Essex.

== Personal life ==
Lord Dovercourt married Eva Gertrude, daughter of William Thomas Rowley, in 1905. He died in Marylebone, London, in April 1961, aged 82. The barony became extinct on his death.

Party political offices
Preceded by James Henderson-Stewart	Chairman of the National Liberal Party; 1946–1947	Succeeded by John Maclay
Parliament of the United Kingdom
Preceded by George Robert Harland Bowden	Member of Parliament for North East Derbyshire; 1918 – 1922	Succeeded by Frank Lee
Preceded by John Pybus	Member of Parliament for Harwich; 1935–1954	Succeeded by Sir Julian Ridsdale
Peerage of the United Kingdom
New creation	Baron Dovercourt; 1954–1961	Extinct
