= Central Norfolk =

Parliamentary constituency in the United Kingdom, 1950–1974

- Former county constituency for the House of Commons

1950–February 1974
- Seats: one
- Created from: North Norfolk, East Norfolk and South Norfolk
- Replaced by: North Norfolk, South Norfolk

Central Norfolk was a county constituency in the county of Norfolk. It returned one Member of Parliament (MP) to the House of Commons of the Parliament of the United Kingdom.

== History ==
The constituency was created by the Representation of the People Act 1948 for the 1950 general election, and abolished for the February 1974 general election.

== Boundaries and boundary changes ==
=== 1950–1951 ===
- The Rural Districts of Forehoe and Henstead, and St Faith's and Aylsham; and
- The Rural District of Blofield and Flegg parishes of Great and Little Plumstead, Postwick, and Thorpe next Norwich.

The Rural District of Forehoe and Henstead was previously part of South Norfolk, the former Rural District of Aylesham (now merged with the former Rural District of St Faith's) was part of North Norfolk, and remaining areas, to the north and east of Norwich, were part of the abolished constituency of East Norfolk.

=== 1951–1974 ===
- As prior but with slightly redrawn boundaries.

Minor transfer to Norwich North under the provisions of Statutory Instrument 1951/325.

On abolition, the Rural District of St Faiths and Aylsham was transferred to North Norfolk, the Rural District of Forhoe and Henstead to South Norfolk and the part of the Rural District of Blofield and Flegg to Yarmouth. Small parts transferred to Norwich North and Norwich South due to expansion of the County Borough.

== Members of Parliament ==
Election	Member	Party	Notes
1950	Frank Medlicott	National Liberal and Conservative	
1959	Richard Collard	Conservative and National Liberal	Died in office August 1962
1962 by-election	Ian Gilmour	Conservative	
Feb 1974	constituency abolished		

== Elections ==
=== Elections in the 1950s ===
General election 1950: Norfolk Central
Party	Candidate	Votes	%	±%
National Liberal	Frank Medlicott	20,407	51.3	
Labour	G. W. Holderness	16,516	41.5	
Liberal	Philip Jebb	2,859	7.2	
Majority		3,891	9.8	
Turnout		39,782	84.3	
National Liberal win (new seat)				

General election 1951: Norfolk Central
Party	Candidate	Votes	%	±%
National Liberal	Frank Medlicott	21,909	55.92	
Labour	John R Lambley	17,270	44.08	
Majority		4,639	11.84	
Turnout		39,179	81.75	
National Liberal hold		Swing		

General election 1955: Norfolk Central
Party	Candidate	Votes	%	±%
National Liberal	Frank Medlicott	21,851	57.29	
Labour	Elizabeth Littlejohn	16,288	42.71	
Majority		5,563	14.58	
Turnout		38,139	77.41	
National Liberal hold		Swing		

General election 1959: Norfolk Central
Party	Candidate	Votes	%	±%
National Liberal	Richard Collard	21,918	50.4	−6.9
Labour	Frank H Stone	15,131	34.8	−7.9
Liberal	Geoffrey Maxwell Goode	6,465	14.8	New
Majority		6,787	15.6	+1.0
Turnout		43,514	79.8	+2.4
National Liberal hold		Swing		

=== Elections in the 1960s ===
1962 Central Norfolk by-election
Party	Candidate	Votes	%	±%
National Liberal	Ian Gilmour	13,268	37.7	−12.7
Labour	Geoffrey B L Bennett	13,048	37.0	+2.2
Liberal	Geoffrey Maxwell Goode	7,915	22.5	+7.7
Independent Liberal	Kenneth Coleman	909	2.6	New
Independent	J. Andrews	79	0.2	New
Majority		220	0.7	−14.9
Turnout		35,217	60.2	−19.6
National Liberal hold		Swing	−7.5	

- anti-Common Market

General election 1964: Norfolk Central
Party	Candidate	Votes	%	±%
Conservative	Ian Gilmour	24,486	49.0	−1.4
Labour	Geoffrey B L Bennett	18,481	37.0	+2.2
Liberal	Geoffrey Maxwell Goode	6,961	14.0	−0.8
Majority		6,005	12.0	−3.6
Turnout		49,928		
Conservative hold		Swing		

General election 1966: Norfolk Central
Party	Candidate	Votes	%	±%
Conservative	Ian Gilmour	27,935	54.3	+5.3
Labour	Bryan Davies	23,529	45.7	+8.7
Majority		4,406	8.6	−3.4
Turnout		51,464	79.8	
Conservative hold		Swing		

=== Elections in the 1970s ===
General election 1970: Norfolk Central
Party	Candidate	Votes	%	±%
Conservative	Ian Gilmour	32,921	56.6	+2.3
Labour	Charles R Coyne	19,030	32.7	−13.0
Liberal	Royle Drew	6,172	10.6	New
Majority		13,891	23.9	+15.3
Turnout		58,123		
Conservative hold		Swing		
