= National Liberal Party (UK, 1931) =

Political party in the United Kingdom from 1931 to 1968

- Leader: David Renton (last)
- Founded: 1931
- Dissolved: 1968
- Split from: Liberal Party
- Merged into: Conservative Party
- Ideology: National liberalism; Protectionism
- Political position: Centre-right

The National Liberal Party, known until 1948 as the Liberal National Party, was a liberal political party in the United Kingdom from 1931 to 1968. It broke away from the Liberal Party on the issue of abandoning free trade and supporting protectionism, and later co-operated and merged with the Conservative Party.

== History ==
The Liberal Nationals evolved as a distinctive group within the Liberal Party when the main body of Liberals maintained in office the second Labour government of Ramsay MacDonald, who lacked a majority in Parliament. A growing number of Liberal MPs led by Sir John Simon declared their total opposition to this policy and began to co-operate more closely with the Conservative Party, even advocating a policy of replacing free trade with tariffs, anathema to many traditional Liberals. By June 1931, three Liberal MPs — Simon, Ernest Brown and Robert Hutchison (a former Lloyd George ministry-supporting coalitionist of the earlier National Liberal Party) — resigned their party's whip and sat as independents.

When the Labour Government was replaced by a makeshift, emergency (though to prove long-lasting) National Government in August 1931, dissident Liberals were temporarily reconciled with the rest of their party within it; but in the next two months the party's acting leader, Herbert Samuel, came close to resigning from the government over the National Government's proposal to call a snap general election, fearing that it would lead to a majority for the Conservatives and the abolition of free trade. However, he was undermined by the willingness of those Liberals such as Simon – who in extremis would support protectionism – to continue to support the National Government and even to take the vacant offices to ensure it retained a broad party base. Samuel was welcomed back into the new National Government subject to an agreed concession to fight the general election on a separate Liberal Party manifesto, but staunch supporters of the National Government were prepared to repudiate free trade.

=== Split of the Liberal Party in 1931 ===
Witnessing the rise of cheap foreign goods, the party split over how they would negotiate over ardent Conservative protectionism: supporters formed the Liberal National Party in the run-up to the 1931 general election in October. A third group under the official leader, David Lloyd George, also emerged, the Independent Liberals, who opposed the National Government completely, but this had few adherents amongst prominent Liberals beyond Lloyd George's relatives. After the 1935 general election these Liberals reunited with the mainstream Liberals, colloquially dubbed "Samuelites".

Following the 1931 general election, Liberals following John Simon formally repudiated the official Liberal Party in Parliament and operated to all extents and purposes as a separate party group, known as "Simonites", though they were not immediately fully recognised as such. In 1932 the "Samuelite" Liberals resigned from the government over the result of the Ottawa Conference – the introduction of a series of tariff agreements – though they continued to support the National Government from the back benches. By 1933 they had abandoned it completely and crossed the floor of the House of Commons, leaving the Liberal Nationals supporting the government. The two groups were now completely separate, though some Liberal MPs like Robert Bernays remained on the Government benches before officially joining the Liberal Nationals, and other MPs maintained links across the floor.

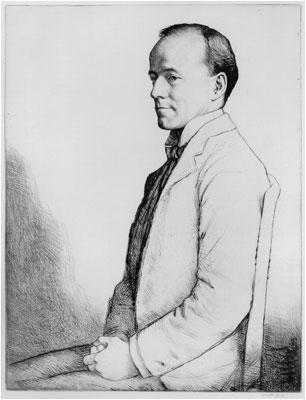
Walter Runciman, a key Liberal National but President of the Liberal Party's Federation until 1936

Within the wider party, the split was not so clear. Liberal Associations which supported Liberal National candidates remained affiliated to the National Liberal Federation, the mainstream body for the official party, until that body was dissolved in 1936; in particular one Liberal National cabinet minister, Walter Runciman elected in 1899, of a wealthy shipping family, remained its President even after the Commons split. Its replacement, the Liberal National Council, the main organ of the local (extra-parliamentary) party, was founded in 1936. However, there were increasing divisions when some Liberal associations endorsed Liberal Nationals, especially at by-elections: frequently Independent Liberals came forward to oppose such a candidate endorsed by the local association that called itself 'Liberal' but was actually Liberal National.

Throughout the 1930s and 1940s, there were a number of proposals to reunite the two Liberal parties, but these routinely foundered on the question of continued support for the National Government. During World War II the Liberal Nationals suffered a stream of defectors who joined either the independent Liberals or the Conservatives, or else became non-party supporters of the government. In 1940 the National Government was replaced by an all-party coalition led by Winston Churchill; the Liberal Nationals were marginalised, with Simon "kicked upstairs" to become Lord Chancellor. The party's new leader, Ernest Brown, was only occasionally accorded the status of a party leader within the coalition and otherwise faced questions over the future of the party. Proposals emerged again for the party to reunite with the independent Liberals, but these foundered on Brown's insistence on supporting a revival of the National Government once the Coalition broke up, which the independent Liberals rejected.

After both parties' drubbing and the Labour Party's victory in the 1945 general election, the two factions made renewed attempts at reuniting. At Westminster the core, independent Liberals were in a shattered state, their tiny numbers representing all shades of opinion; and it was doubtful that the new leader, Clement Davies (himself a former Liberal National who had defected back to the independent Liberals) could carry all of his colleagues into a united party. Only in London (where neither Liberal party had any MPs) were the two reunited at the regional organisational level, although in some individual boroughs and constituencies such as Huddersfield rival Liberal associations began co-operating and eventually merging as avowed Liberal associations. At the same time, there were calls from devout Liberal Nationals, who had cooperated closely with the Conservatives and received numerous ministerial posts in the four National Governments, for that entire wing to fully unify with the Conservatives. These Liberal Nationals rarely expressed any overt divergence of opinion with Conservatives. Few political commentators discerned a difference between the two.

=== Merger with the Conservative Party ===
In May 1947, the Woolton-Teviot agreement between Lord Woolton (for the Conservatives) and Lord Teviot (for the Liberal Nationals) resulted in the two parties merging at the constituency level. The Liberal Nationals also changed their name to National Liberals at that stage. Their original reluctance to take that label was said to be a reaction to Lloyd George's use of the name for the earlier National Liberal Party in the 1920s.

The National Liberals therefore fought the next six British general elections as allies of the Conservative Party. To confuse matters, their candidates stood for election with a variety of names, including National Liberal, Liberal National, National Liberal and Conservative, Liberal and Conservative, and so on. Even established Conservatives with little or no former connection to the original party (including Randolph Churchill) after 1950 used the National Liberal name when standing as candidates in some wards and constituencies.

=== Immediate consequences for the Liberal Party ===
Even more than before 1947, the appearance of National Liberal candidates aggrieved the Liberal Party. They saw this as a blatant misappropriation by the Conservative Party of their historic party and to confuse the public. This increased the Liberal Party's perilous political position. In 1951 it was only thanks to fraught local arrangements that five of the six remaining Liberal MPs were elected in the absence of a Conservative candidate. Two of these elections were achieved by formal local pacts, whereby only one Liberal or Conservative candidate would stand in each constituency (in Bolton and Huddersfield). Increasingly, with electoral deposits expensive and electoral support low, the Liberal Party fielded few candidates, especially in 1951 and 1955 when the party barely mustered over 100 to stand for Parliament.

=== Consequences for the National Liberal Party ===
While the Liberal Party struggled to survive, the National Liberals won 16 seats in the 1950 general election. In subsequent elections, their numbers increased to 19 (1951), and 21 (1955) and 20 in (1959). They retained their status as the larger of the two Liberal groupings in Parliament.

During this period, two National Liberals held cabinet rank, plus one who sat as a "Liberal":

- John Scott Maclay, 1st Viscount Muirshiel, was Secretary of State for Scotland from 1957 to 1962 until he was sacked along with six other Cabinet ministers by the Prime Minister, Harold Macmillan.
- Charles Hill, best known for his work in the 1940s as the Radio Doctor giving nutritional advice on the BBC Home Service, stood as an Independent in the 1945 general election, but then won the Luton parliamentary seat as a Conservative and National Liberal in 1950. He was appointed Parliamentary Secretary to the Ministry of Food in 1951; from 1957 to 1961 he was Chancellor of the Duchy of Lancaster; and from 1961 he was Minister of Housing and Local Government and Welsh Affairs. He also lost his place in the Cabinet in Harold Macmillan's reshuffle in 1962.
- Gwilym Lloyd George, MP for Pembrokeshire 1922–1950 and for Newcastle upon Tyne North 1951–1957, had moved away from the Liberal Party by 1946 (though in 1945 he was separately offered the position of party leader by the Liberals and by the Liberal Nationals). He sat as a Liberal but joined Winston Churchill on the opposition front bench. Unusually, he never formally joined the National Liberals, and while not sitting on the government benches in 1931, had been independent of the Liberal Party whip since that year and ultimately accepted a junior post in the Neville Chamberlain National Government administration in 1939. He served as Home Secretary from 1954 to 1957.

== Merger ==
By the early 1960s the justification for the continued separate political existence of the National Liberals had become weak. A joint Conservative and National Liberal candidate (Michael Shaw) gained a seat from the opposition Labour Party in a by-election in Brighouse and Spenborough in 1960. In 1962, Ian Gilmour, who later was a Conservative cabinet minister, defended the National Liberal seat of Central Norfolk as that party's candidate in a by-election. Another noteworthy National Liberal candidate in this time period was the future Deputy Prime Minister, Michael Heseltine, who had stood as a National Liberal for the Gower constituency in 1959, then stood as a Conservative for more winnable seats in the 1960s.

After 1962, the party lacked a senior government presence, and with the retirement or death of former leaders, only six with the National Liberal label were elected in the general election of 1964. A further four who had sat with this label preferred to be elected under a 'straight' Conservative instead. The post of chairman of the parliamentary party was filled by the former junior minister David Renton, the MP for Huntingdon since 1945, with veteran National Liberal Herbert Butcher (who sat for the seat of Holland with Boston) remaining their chief whip. Butcher retired at the 1966 general election, in which the National Liberals were reduced to just three MPs (including the future Conservative Party cabinet minister John Nott). Two others (Joan Vickers and John Osborn) were elected as Conservatives. With so few MPs, they agreed to give up to the Liberal Party a room at the Westminster Parliament that they had used for their meetings.

In its last years, the party was used by architect John Poulson as a way into politics while not being fully committed to the Conservatives. Poulson, who was Chairman of the National Liberal Council's Executive Committee from 1964, had little political skill, and his speeches were written by a Scottish Office civil servant, George Pottinger, who was on his payroll. However, the party had lost most of its senior members, and in 1968 the remaining National Liberals, still led by David Renton, assimilated completely into the Conservative Party.

== Leaders ==
- 1931–1940: Sir John Simon
- 1940–1945: Ernest Brown
- 1945–1946: James Henderson-Stewart
- 1946–1947: Stanley Holmes
- 1947–1956: John Maclay
- 1956–1959: James Duncan
- 1959–1961: James Henderson-Stewart
- 1961–1964: Colin Thornton-Kemsley
- 1964–1968: David Renton

== Electoral performance ==
Election	Votes	%	Party leader	Seats	Government
1931	809,302	3.7	John Simon	35 / 615	National Labour–Conservative–Liberal Party
1935	784,608	3.7	John Simon	33 / 615	Conservative–National Labour–Liberal National
1945	686,652	2.9	Ernest Brown	11 / 640	Labour
1950	985,343	3.4	John Maclay	16 / 625	Labour
1951	1,058,138	3.7	John Maclay	19 / 625	Conservative–National Liberal
1955	842,113	3.1	John Maclay	21 / 630	Conservative–National Liberal
1959	765,794	2.7	Sir James Duncan	20 / 630	Conservative–National Liberal
1964	326,130	1.2	Colin Thornton-Kemsley	6 / 630	Labour
1966	149,779	0.5	David Renton	3 / 630	Labour

== Legacy ==
In October 2013, Conservative MP Nick Boles suggested in a speech that the National Liberal Party be revived as an affiliate of the Conservative Party.

== See also ==
- List of National Liberal Party (UK, 1931) MPs
- National Liberal Party (UK) election results
- Liberalism in the United Kingdom
- Scottish Unionist Party

== Bibliography ==
- The History of the Liberal Party 1895–1970, by Roy Douglas (Sidgwick & Jackson 1971)
- A Short History of the Liberal Party 1900–92, by Chris Cook (Macmillan Press 1993)
- Liberals in Schism: A History of the National Liberal Party, by David Dutton (London; I. B. Tauris & Co., 2008)
