= Strathclyde (disambiguation) =

Strathclyde may refer to:

- Strathclyde, the former local government region of Scotland, 1973 to 1996, which served as a police force area and fire service area until 2013, and is still a transport authority area, covered by:
  - Strathclyde Police
  - Strathclyde Fire and Rescue Service
  - Strathclyde Partnership for Transport (formerly Greater Glasgow Passenger Transport Executive, Strathclyde Passenger Transport Executive and Strathclyde Passenger Transport Authority)
- The Kingdom of Strathclyde, the ancient Brythonic kingdom which included most of the area of the former local government region

Other things in Scotland with Strathclyde in their names include:

- University of Strathclyde, in Glasgow
  - Strathclyde Business School
- Strathclyde Park, in North Lanarkshire
- Strathclyde F.C., defunct football team based in Glasgow

People bearing the name Strathclyde include:

- List of Kings of Strathclyde
- Those bearing the title Baron Strathclyde:
  - Alexander Ure, 1st Baron Strathclyde
  - Thomas Galbraith, 1st Baron Strathclyde
  - Thomas Galbraith, 2nd Baron Strathclyde

Other uses:

- Strathclyde Concertos, ten concertos by Peter Maxwell Davies
