= Parliamentary Under-Secretary of State for Scotland =

UK government position

United Kingdom Parliamentary Under-Secretary of State for Scotland
- Royal Arms of His Majesty's Government in Scotland

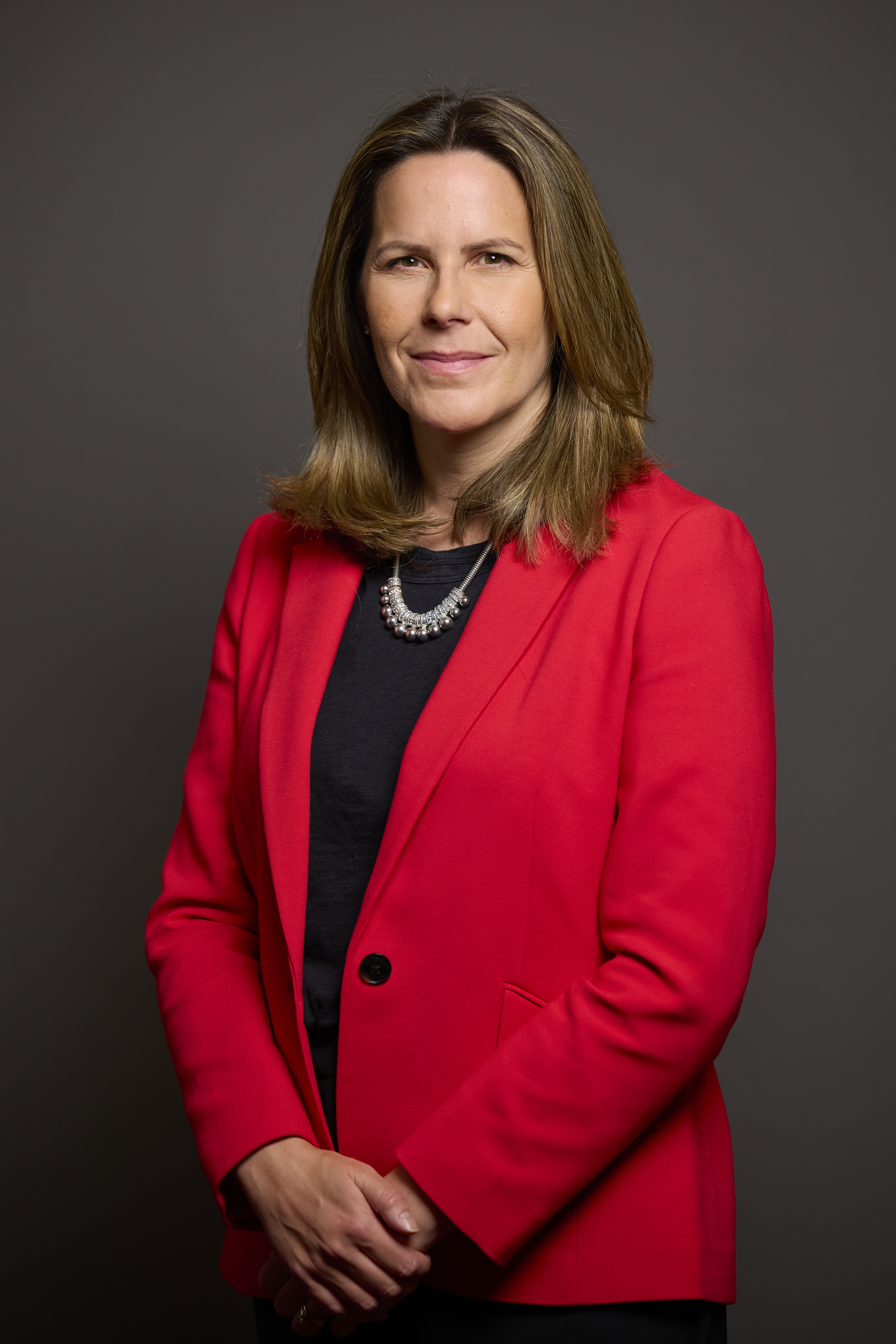
- Incumbent; Melanie Ward since 22 July 2026
- Scotland Office
- Appointer: The Monarch (on the advice of the Prime Minister)
- Inaugural holder: John Pratt
- Formation: 8 August 1919
- Website: Scotland Office

The Parliamentary Under-Secretary of State for Scotland is a junior ministerial post (of Parliamentary Under-Secretary of State rank) in the Government of the United Kingdom, supporting the Secretary of State for Scotland. The post is also known as Deputy Secretary of State for Scotland.

== History ==
The post was first established as the Parliamentary Under-Secretary for Health for Scotland in 1919, before becoming the Parliamentary Under-Secretary of State for Scotland in 1926. Additional Parliamentary Under-Secretary posts were added in 1940 and 1951, and a Minister of State post was established in 1951. In 1969–70, one of the Under-Secretary posts was replaced by an additional Minister of State. From 1974 to 1979, there were two Ministers of State and three Under-Secretaries, reverting to one Minister of State in 1979. In 1997, the second Minister of State post was reinstated, and a fourth Under-Secretary post was briefly added from August 1998.

Following devolution in 1999, the number of ministers was reduced. There is currently one Under-Secretary to support the Secretary of State, and there is no Minister of State.

== List of office holders ==
=== Under-Secretary for Health for Scotland (1919–1926) ===
Name	Portrait	Party	Term start	Prime Minister
John Pratt MP for Glasgow Cathcart		Liberal Party	8 August 1919	David Lloyd George
James Kidd MP for Linlithgowshire		Unionist Party	31 October 1922	Bonar Law
Walter Elliot MP for Lanark		Unionist Party	15 January 1923	Stanley Baldwin
James Stewart MP for Glasgow St Rollox		Labour Party	23 January 1924	Ramsay MacDonald
Walter Elliot MP for Glasgow Kelvingrove		Unionist Party	11 November 1924	Stanley Baldwin

=== Under-Secretary of State for Scotland (1926–) ===
Parliamentary Under-Secretary of State for Scotland
Name	Portrait	Party	Term start	Term end	Prime Minister
Walter Elliott MP for Glasgow Kelvingrove		Unionist Party	26 July 1926	7 June 1929	
Thomas Johnston MP for Dundee		Labour Party	7 June 1929	25 March 1931	
Joseph Westwood MP for Stirling and Falkirk		Labour Party	25 March 1931	August 1931	
Noel Skelton MP for Combined Scottish Universities		Unionist Party	3 September 1931	22 November 1935 (Died in office)	
John Colville MP for Midlothian and Peebles Northern		Unionist Party	28 November 1935	29 October 1936	
Henry Scrymgeour-Wedderburn MP for West Renfrewshire		Unionist Party	29 October 1936	6 September 1939	
Captain Sir John McEwen MP for Berwick and Haddington		Unionist Party	6 September 1939	17 May 1940	
Joseph Westwood MP for Stirling and Falkirk		Labour Party	17 May 1940	23 May 1945	
Captain Henry Scrymgeour-Wedderburn MP for West Renfrewshire		Unionist Party	8 February 1941	4 March 1942	
Allan Chapman MP for Rutherglen		Unionist Party	4 March 1942	26 July 1945	
Thomas Galbraith MP for Glasgow Pollok		Unionist Party	26 May 1945	26 July 1945	
George Buchanan MP for Glasgow Gorbals		Labour Party	4 August 1945	7 October 1947	
Tom Fraser MP for Hamilton		Labour Party	4 August 1945	26 October 1951	
John Robertson MP for Berwick		Labour Party	7 October 1947	26 October 1951	
Margaret Herbison MP for North Lanarkshire		Labour Party	2 March 1950	26 October 1951	
Thomas Galbraith MP for Glasgow Pollok		Unionist Party	2 November 1951	5 April 1955	
Sir William McNair Snadden MP for Kinross and Western Perthshire		Unionist Party	2 November 1951	3 June 1955	
Sir James Henderson Stewart MP for East Fife		Liberal National	4 February 1952	9 January 1957	Harold Macmillan
Jack Nixon Browne MP for Glasgow Craigton		Scottish Conservative Party	7 April 1955	9 January 1957	Harold Macmillan
Niall Macpherson MP for Dumfriesshire		Liberal National	13 June 1955	9 January 1957	Harold Macmillan
Jack Nixon Browne MP for Glasgow Craigton		Conservative Party	18 January 1957	22 October 1959	Harold Macmillan
Major Lord John Hope MP for Edinburgh Pentlands		Unionist Party	18 January 1957	22 October 1959	Harold Macmillan
Niall Macpherson MP for Dumfriesshire		Liberal National	19 January 1957	28 October 1960	Harold Macmillan
Thomas Galbraith, 1st Baron Strathclyde		Unionist Party	22 October 1959	8 November 1962	Harold Macmillan
Gilmour Leburn MP for Kinross and West Perthshire		Conservative Party	22 October 1959	15 August 1963	Harold Macmillan
Lieutenant-Colonel Richard Brooman-White MP for Rutherglen		Conservative Party	28 October 1960	12 December 1963	Harold Macmillan
Priscilla Buchan, Baroness Tweedsmuir MP for Aberdeen South		Unionist Party	3 December 1962	16 October 1964	Harold Macmillan
Anthony Stodart MP for Edinburgh West		Conservative Party	19 August 1963	16 October 1964	Sir Alec Douglas-Home
Gordon Campbell MP for Moray and Nairn		Conservative Party	12 December 1963	16 October 1964	Sir Alec Douglas-Home
Dickson Mabon MP for Greenock		Labour and Co-operative Party	20 October 1964	7 January 1967	Harold Wilson
William Hughes, Baron Hughes		Labour Party	21 October 1964	13 October 1969	Harold Wilson
Bruce Millan MP for Glasgow Craigton		Labour Party	6 April 1966	19 June 1970	Harold Wilson
Norman Buchan MP for West Renfrewshire		Labour Party	7 January 1967	19 June 1970	Harold Wilson
Alick Buchanan-Smith MP for North Angus and Mearns		Conservative Party	24 June 1970	4 March 1974	Edward Heath
George Younger MP for Ayr		Conservative Party	24 June 1970	8 January 1974	Edward Heath
Sir Teddy Taylor MP for Glasgow Cathcart		Conservative Party	24 June 1970	28 July 1971	Edward Heath
Hector Monro MP for Dumfries		Conservative Party	28 July 1971	4 March 1974	Edward Heath
Sir Teddy Taylor MP for Glasgow Cathcart		Conservative Party	8 January 1974	4 March 1974	Edward Heath
Robert Hughes MP for Aberdeen North		Labour Party	11 March 1974	22 July 1975	Harold Wilson
Hugh Brown MP for Glasgow Provan		Labour Party	28 June 1974	4 May 1979	Harold Wilson
Harry Ewing MP for Stirling, Falkirk and Grangemouth		Labour Party	18 October 1974	4 May 1979	Harold Wilson
Frank McElhone MP for Glasgow Queen's Park		Labour Party	12 September 1975	4 May 1979	Harold Wilson
Frank McElhone MP for Glasgow Queen's Park		Labour Party	12 September 1975	4 May 1979	James Callaghan
Alex Fletcher MP for Edinburgh North		Conservative Party	7 May 1979	14 June 1983	Margaret Thatcher
Russell Fairgrieve MP for Aberdeenshire West		Conservative Party	7 May 1979	15 September 1981	Margaret Thatcher
Sir Malcolm Rifkind MP for Edinburgh Pentlands		Conservative Party	7 May 1979	6 April 1982	Margaret Thatcher
Allan Stewart MP for East Renfrewshire (until 1983); MP for Eastwood (1983–1997)		Conservative Party	15 September 1981	10 September 1986	Margaret Thatcher
John MacKay MP for Argyll (until 1983); MP for Argyll and Bute (1983–1987)		Conservative Party	6 April 1982	14 June 1987	Margaret Thatcher
Michael Ancram MP for Edinburgh South		Conservative Party	13 June 1983	14 June 1987	Margaret Thatcher
Ian Lang MP for Galloway and Upper Nithsdale		Conservative Party	10 September 1986	13 June 1987	Margaret Thatcher
James Douglas-Hamilton MP for Edinburgh West		Conservative Party	13 June 1987	6 July 1995	Margaret Thatcher
Michael Forsyth MP for Stirling		Conservative Party	13 June 1987	7 September 1990	Margaret Thatcher
Thomas Galbraith, 2nd Baron Strathclyde		Conservative Party	7 September 1990	14 April 1992	Margaret Thatcher
Allan Stewart MP for Eastwood		Conservative Party	28 November 1990	8 February 1995	John Major
Hector Monro MP for Dumfries		Conservative Party	14 April 1992	6 July 1995	John Major
George Kynoch MP for Kincardine and Deeside		Conservative Party	8 February 1995	2 May 1997	John Major
James Lindesay-Bethune, 16th Earl of Lindsay		Conservative Party	6 July 1995	2 May 1997	John Major
Raymond Robertson MP for Aberdeen South		Conservative Party	6 July 1995	2 May 1997	John Major
Sam Galbraith MP for Strathkelvin and Bearsden		Labour Party	6 May 1997	29 July 1999	Tony Blair
John Sewel, Baron Sewel		Labour Party	6 May 1997	29 July 1999	Tony Blair
Malcolm Chisholm MP for Edinburgh North and Leith		Labour Party	6 May 1997	10 December 1997	Tony Blair
Calum MacDonald MP for Western Isles		Labour Party	11 December 1997	29 July 1999	Tony Blair
Gus Macdonald, Baron Macdonald of Tradeston		Labour Party	3 August 1998	29 July 1999	Tony Blair
Vacant			29 July 1999	29 May 2002	Tony Blair
Anne McGuire MP for Stirling		Labour Party	29 May 2002	11 May 2005	Tony Blair
David Cairns MP for Inverclyde		Labour Party	11 May 2005	28 June 2007	Tony Blair
Ann McKechin MP for Glasgow North		Labour Party	16 September 2008	11 May 2010	Gordon Brown
David Mundell MP for Dumfriesshire, Clydesdale and Tweeddale		Conservative Party	14 May 2010	11 May 2015	David Cameron
Andrew Dunlop, Baron Dunlop		Conservative Party	14 May 2015	10 June 2017	David Cameron
Ian Duncan, Baron Duncan of Springbank		Conservative Party	15 June 2017	27 July 2019	Theresa May
Robin Walker MP for Worcester		Conservative Party	27 July 2019	16 December 2019	Boris Johnson
Colin Clark MP for Gordon		Conservative Party	27 July 2019	16 December 2019	Boris Johnson
Douglas Ross MP for Moray		Conservative Party	16 December 2019	26 May 2020	Boris Johnson
David Duguid MP for Banff and Buchan		Conservative Party	2 June 2020	16 September 2021	Boris Johnson
Iain Stewart MP for Milton Keynes South		Conservative Party	2 June 2020	8 September 2022	Boris Johnson
Malcolm Offord, Baron Offord of Garvel		Conservative Party	4 October 2021	9 February 2024	Boris Johnson; Liz Truss; Rishi Sunak
David Duguid MP for Banff and Buchan		Conservative Party	20 September 2022	27 October 2022	Liz Truss
John Lamont MP for Berwickshire, Roxburgh and Selkirk		Conservative Party	27 October 2022	5 July 2024	Rishi Sunak
Donald Cameron, Baron Cameron of Lochiel		Conservative Party	9 February 2024	5 July 2024	Rishi Sunak
Kirsty McNeill; MP for Midlothian		Labour Party	9 July 2024	20 July 2026	Sir Keir Starmer
Melanie Ward; MP for Cowdenbeath and Kirkcaldy		Labour Party	22 July 2026	Incumbent	Andy Burnham

=== Minister of State for Scotland (1951–2008) ===
- 2 November 1951: Alec Douglas-Home
- 7 April 1955: Thomas Galbraith
- 23 October 1958: Nigel Forbes, 22nd Lord Forbes
- 22 October 1959: Jack Nixon Browne
- 20 October 1964: George Willis
- 7 January 1967: Dickson Mabon (to 19 June 1970)
- 13 October 1969: William Hughes, Baron Hughes (to 19 June 1970)
- 23 June 1970: Priscilla Buchan, Baroness Tweedsmuir
- 7 April 1972: Henry Hepburne-Scott, 10th Lord Polwarth
- 8 March 1974: Bruce Millan (to 8 April 1976)
- 8 March 1974: William Hughes, Baron Hughes (to 8 August 1975)
- 8 August 1975: John Smith, Baron Kirkhill (to 15 December 1978)
- 14 April 1976: Gregor Mackenzie (to 4 May 1979)
- 7 May 1979: William Murray, 8th Earl of Mansfield and Mansfield
- 13 June 1983: Hamish Gray
- 10 September 1986: Simon Arthur, 4th Baron Glenarthur
- 13 June 1987: Ian Lang (to 28 November 1990)
- 13 June 1987: Charles Sanderson, Baron Sanderson of Bowden (to 7 September 1990)
- 7 September 1990: Michael Forsyth
- 14 April 1992: Peter Fraser, Baron Fraser of Carmyllie
- 6 July 1995: Lord James Douglas-Hamilton
- 6 May 1997: Henry McLeish (to 29 June 1999)
- 6 May 1997: Brian Wilson (to 28 July 1998)
- 28 July 1998: Helen Liddell (to 17 May 1999)
- 29 July 1999: Brian Wilson
- 26 January 2001: George Foulkes (to 29 May 2002)
- July 2007: David Cairns (16 September 2008)

== See also ==
- Deputy First Minister of Scotland
