= Socialist perspectives on abortion =

Socialist perspectives on abortion vary. In first world regions such as North America, Europe and Australia, some socialist representatives and activists believe in the legalisation and right to elective abortion care as a public service, whereas others believe that abortion should be limited or not permitted for a number of reasons. In the Third World, there are discussions regarding traditionalists, natalists, Malthusians, and economic voices within society regarding whether (and if so, how) abortion should be permitted.

Socialism influenced a significant number of countries in the 20th century and had long-standing influence on the law of the countries in which it took hold.

Socialist parties can have diverging perspectives regarding the importance of the issue and where the issue derives from. In particular, feminist socialists believe that the oppression of women in society has resulted in restrictions surrounding abortion. A Marxist group, though, may deem abortion as a secondary issue, instead focusing more on what it deems primary issues. At times, left-wing governments have restricted abortion due to concerns about the total fertility rate of the population being affected by high abortion rates.

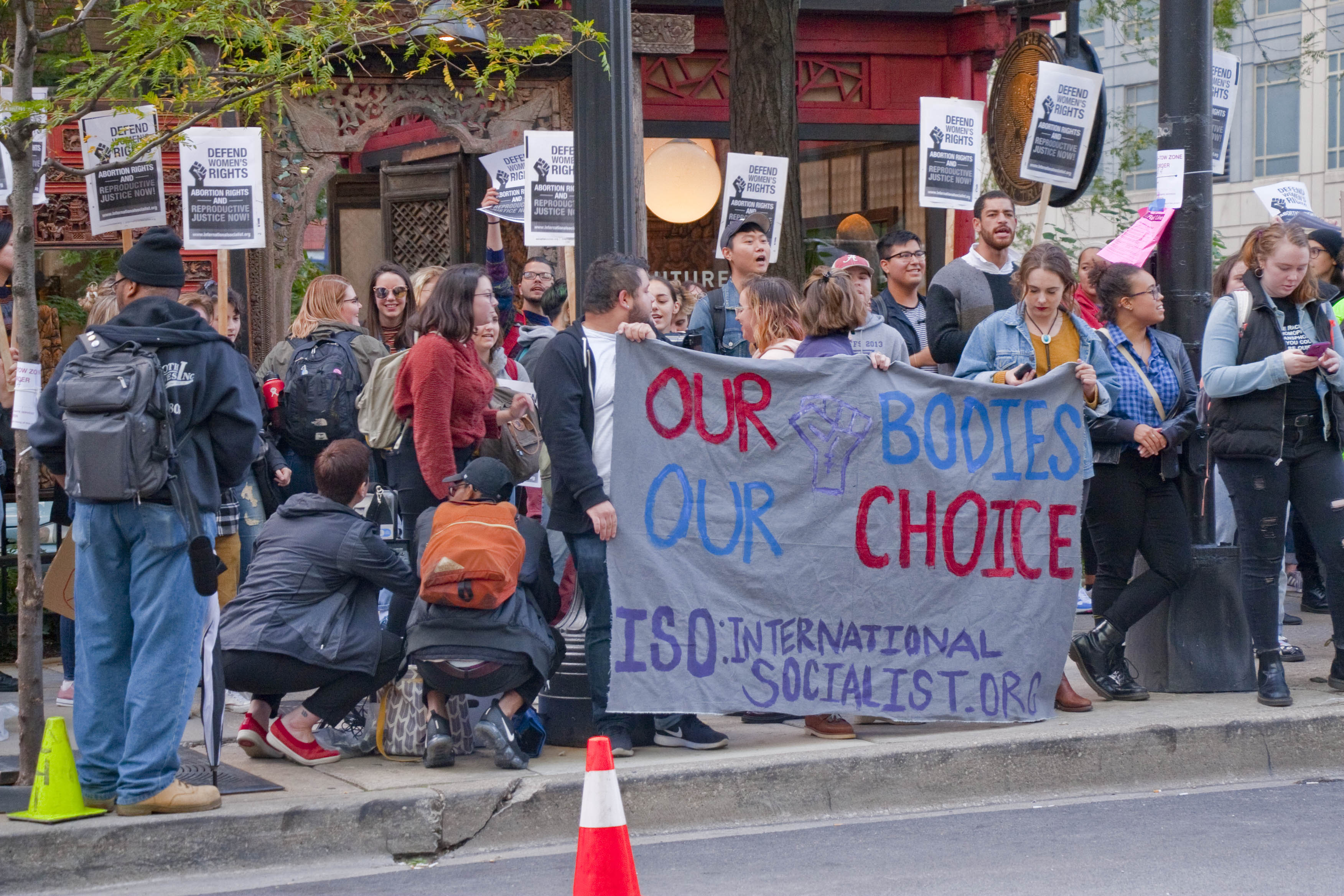
Socialists at a pro-abortion rights protest in Chicago, Illinois

== Socialist abortion rights in Europe ==
Regardless of the diverging views and policies on abortion throughout history in Europe, socialist countries and non-socialist countries approached abortion access in a different manner. During the 1970s, there was a stronger socialist presence in Eastern Europe, under communism, and therefore a fertility policy that strongly favoured abortion rights and access. Historically, in Western Europe, many political ideologies have co-existed, and this has created more differences in opinion (and potential conflict) over suggested fertility policies due to the lack of universal approval. The Eastern Bloc under the Soviet Union restricted debate on the issues involved whereas elsewhere the debate involved many individuals from the health sector, such as physicians and psychologists, as well as church representatives, lawyers and economists.

=== Perspectives on the legalisation of abortion in the USSR ===
Some people believe the socialist body used abortion regulations to create a more idealistic population, with the intention of strengthening and empowering the state. Elective abortion care was legalised in the Union of Soviet Socialist Republics (USSR) in 1955, with other Eastern European countries also legalising abortion in the years following, such as Bulgaria, Poland and Hungary. Abortion was legalised in 1920 until this action was reversed in 1936 and was once again prohibited until 1955. Prior to 1955, whilst it was illegal, abortions had still occurred and therefore posed a large threat to a woman's health after being treated by unskilled individuals in unfavourable conditions. The major push for legal abortion in the USSR was majorly driven by medical experts who explained the issue to the public. When observing the documentation during this period of abortion legislation comparative to the documents provided by gynaecologists and psychologists, the same language is present within both, with heavy emphasis on focusing on the collective. It is uncertain whether professionals felt pressured to make recommendations that complied with the USSR ideology, or if legal elective abortion services stemmed from the scientific recommendation. After legalisation, women had to request an abortion and pay a fee to an abortion committee. There was an increasing rate of abortions and a decreasing birth rate, so the government released propaganda and punished any doctor or physician who performed illegal abortions in order to ensure proper procedures were followed. In 1979, women who elected to have an abortion procedure were not given pay during their time off work, and the procedure wasn't paid for by the government. However, if the abortion was for health reasons, the fee was covered by the government and they still received paid leave. Additionally, all abortions required women to have one counselling session by a midwife. At this time, 273 abortions occurred per 100 births.

==== Abortion between 1920 and 1936 ====
Regulations allowed women to leave work for three weeks following an abortion and receive pay during this absence from work. A woman was allowed an abortion if it was within the first two and a half months of pregnancy. Additionally, it could not be her first born child. A doctor could not refuse an abortion in any other circumstance; however, they could dissuade the patient from undergoing the operation. Although the socialist perspective on abortion allowed access to abortion during this period, there were still doctors opposed to terminating pregnancies. In some instances women were reportedly told that vacant hospital beds were full and could come back in two to three months, forcing them to seek illegal abortion. Doctors were more likely to give abortions to women who met criteria. A woman who was poor and had upwards of three children was generally granted an abortion request, and dispatched to the state hospital for the operation. However, a healthy woman with a higher socioeconomic status and one or two children was often persuaded to keep the unborn child. In some cases doctors would request that a woman observed an abortion operated on another female before undergoing one, in order to ensure this was the right decision for her.

==== Potential ulterior motive for abortion access in 1957 ====
A potential ulterior motive for abortion under the socialist state in 1957 was due to their pro-population stance following the war. They had the perspective that a woman's body was a resource that needed to be maintained at a high quality for reproduction. In order to ensure quality population growth and reproduction, they wanted to reduce the number of illegal abortions. Illegal abortions had the high possibility of harming a woman's reproductive organs and therefore posed a threat for future pregnancy and repopulation. They also advised minority women to have abortions, as they wanted women to have a minimum of two children in a heterosexual white family.

==== Regulation changes in 1986 ====
In this bill, the commissions were eliminated from the abortion process and women had free access to abortions. This was after the discovery that abortions earlier in the pregnancy posed a lesser threat to a woman's health comparative to later months.

==== Statistics on abortion in USSR ====
Per 100 childbirths, 400 abortion procedures occurred. This would assume that the average woman under Soviet control in 1967 would have, on average, nine abortions in her lifetime. The USSR was estimated to have spent $525M on abortion procedures this year. This was 17% of the world spend on fertility control during this period.

==== Abortion in post-Soviet states ====
In Armenia, abortion remains legalised upon request up to 12 weeks, after a three-day reflection period. Additionally, it is illegal to perform sex-selective abortions.

=== Czechoslovakia's abortion policy ===
Abortion in state-socialist Czechoslovakia was legalised early comparative to Western Europe. Abortion was legalised in 1957 under the Czechoslovak Act on Artificial Termination of Pregnancy. This policy allowed particular commissions, established by the government, the jurisdiction to give a woman access to elective abortion care. These commissions regulated the number of abortions, and were able to analyse the women requesting an abortions. Some people believe commissions used this restricted access to information with the purpose of acquiring more power, and approved access to abortion to strengthen the state, rather than ensuring women's health. The commission had the power to grant or deny a woman permission to receive an abortion.

==== Post state socialism collapse ====
The state socialist government collapsed in 1989. The increased access to the pill resulted in a reduction in the number of abortions, following a peak in the number of elective abortion from 1987 to 1992. This period in time had increased access to information on sex and contraception methods. Perspectives towards family orientation diverged from the norm during the state socialist reign.

=== Abortion in Hungary ===
Following World War II, abortion was determined by medical judgement and professionalism. This changed in 1949 when communism was in the process of consolidating their power, which criminalised abortion. It was illegal even in circumstances where women provided medical reasons. Some people believe this decision was driven by the post war shortage of labour for the workforce. Instead of increasing the birthrate in the long term, the illegal birth rate increased. When abortion became legal in 1956 in Hungary the population struggled to replace itself, which meant that a lot of incentives were created to encourage procreation. After legalisation, there were still measure in place that could potentially limit a woman's ability to access abortion, such as the requirement to see a counsellor, the price of abortion doubled and doctors were allowed to decide whether they actually performed the procedure.

=== Perspectives in the United Kingdom ===
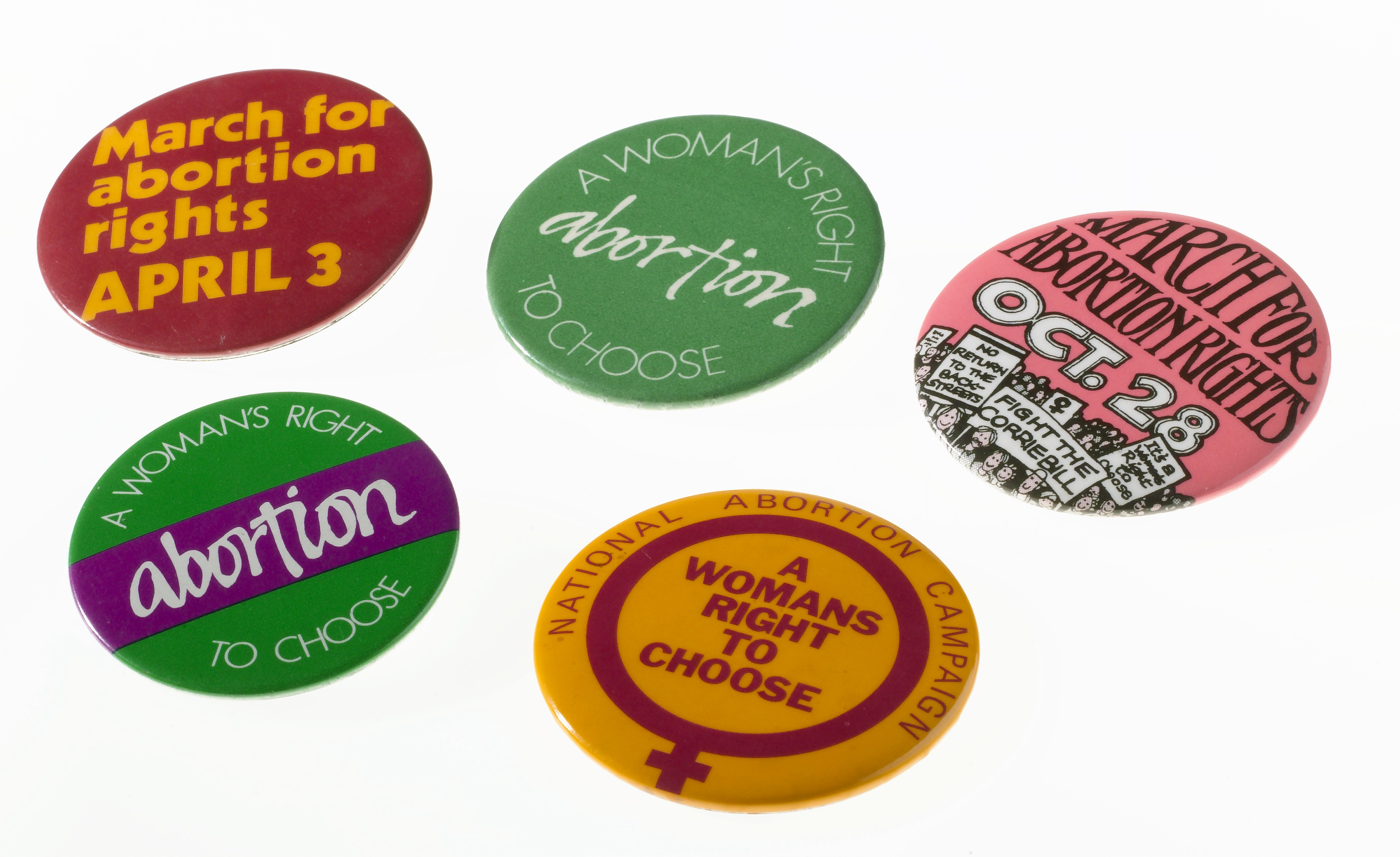
Five National Abortion Campaign badges, United Kingdom, 1970

The National Abortion Campaign was developed in the UK following the failure of a private member's bill by Labour MP James White in 1975 to amend the 1967 Abortion Act. During this time the 1967 Abortion Act was under scrutiny as it required two doctors to examine a woman's medical, psychological and social situation. The bill required a woman to admit that she was unfit to become a mother in order to receive approval for an abortion.

The National Abortion Campaign, led by feminists, increased the ability for women to come together, lobbying for legal abortion to be maintained in British law and a woman's right to choose an abortion. Many socialist individuals partook in this woman's movement, and campaigned due to its alliance with their socialist beliefs regarding the emancipation of women. During this time, the women's liberation movement was growing and campaigning not only for legal abortion, but the economic, psychological and social freedom of women.

A diversity of views on abortion continue to be held within Labour. For example, when amendments to propose changes in the term limit (of 24 weeks of gestation) were put forward in Parliament in 2008, 17 Labour MPs voted for a 12-week limit, 19 MPs for a 16-week limit, 43 MPs for a 20-week limit, and 60 MPs for a 22-week limit.

The Irish nationalist Social Democratic and Labour Party (SDLP) previously had a binding pro-life policy which was changed in 2018 to allow members to vote individually on grounds of conscience. The party's policy is that the right to life (including before birth) is the most basic human right and that matters of unwanted pregnancy should be approached with compassion and more support for mothers and the family unit.

=== Women's liberation movement ===
A socialist feminist in the 1970s typically had the choice to follow a Marxism perspective of society, or separate themselves and join the women's movement. The issue for a woman aligning herself with a Marxist group during this period, was the presence of male-domination within the group. They deemed woman's issues inferior to other political concerns, and tended to divide labour by gender. Often, abortion was justified by population control; however, socialist feminists believe the access to abortion is a necessity. Feminist socialists focused on overall equality of the sexes, focusing on abortion becoming free to all women free of charge or reason. There were different groups of feminists including separatist feminist, liberal feminist, and socialist feminist.

During the Women's Liberation Movement, the woman believed all voices shall be heard, and were anti-hierarchical, therefore not having a need for one specific leader. There was a large focus on ensuring women gained confidence about their sexuality and psychology, with abortion standing in the way of ownership of their body. Two reasons they believed that women in 1970 were oppressed was due to the economic dependence on men, as well as the sexual objectification of women.

=== Labour Zionism ===
In Israel, The left-wing party Meretz argues in favor of legalized abortion for reasons of personal liberty. In 2006, MK Zehava Gal-On of Meretz proposed a bill that would eliminate the termination committees, effectively decriminalizing unrestricted abortion. Gal-On argued that women with financial means can have abortions in private clinics, bypassing the committee and therefore gaining rights based on their wealth. The bill was rejected by a wide margin.

== Within Third-World socialist movements ==
=== Bolivia ===
During the government of Evo Morales, despite opposition by the church, the abortion by social and economic reasons was allowed.

=== Brazil ===
The abortion in Brazilian politics had never been subject of debate before the 2000s. The opinions about the issue by top names of socialism, like Miguel Arraes or Leonel Brizola are subject of doubt. While chief of executive of Rio de Janeiro state, Brizola approved a law supporting aid for women who wish to perform limited abortions, but accepted a asking by a bishop, and ask for the Assembly to revoke the law a few weeks later. Luiz Inácio Lula da Silva, before the 2010s decade, was against abortion. Heloísa Helena and Eduardo Campos, were also against abortion. Nowadays, abortion on request is supported by the vast majority of socialists, like Guilherme Boulos, Ciro Gomes, Manuela d'Ávila, Dilma Rousseff, Fernando Haddad and Lula.

=== Indonesia ===
Socialist leader Sukarno, never supported the abortion on request, preferring to think about a strong population for his country. Only after his deposition, his successor, Suharto, established a birth control and family planning.

=== Sandinism ===
In Nicaragua, the Sandinist government often declares the children as subject of mothers' responsibility, and supports aiding from state to help these mothers. The Sandinist government, with support of Catholic Church, passed laws banning all forms of abortion, but uses the state to helping and praising women that bears the duty to becoming mothers. These laws and state positions sound controversial among media, because even underage mothers are seem as an example of parental praise.

=== Tanzania ===
Despite the opposition to abortion by socialist leader, Julius Nyerere, the country always had a notable doctrine of family planning. The government supported the Family Planning Association of Tanzania, although it considers abortion not to be an alternative to contraception, but a termination of pregnancy.

=== Tunisia ===
During the socialist Habib Bourguiba's government, the country become the first Arab Muslim majority country to legalize abortion on request.

=== Uruguay ===
During the government of socialist president José Mujica, the country become the second Latino-American country to allows abortion on request.

== Within religious movements ==
Christian socialists and followers of liberation theology often describes themselves as pro-life Catholics. Paulo Freire and Óscar Romero were examples of socialist pro-life Catholics.

== Abortion in China ==
Abortion in China is legal and generally accessible nationwide.
