= Nigel Forbes, 22nd Lord Forbes =

British Army officer and politician (1918–2013)

Nigel Ivan Forbes, 22nd Lord Forbes KBE JP DL (19 February 1918 – 5 March 2013), known as the Master of Forbes until 1953, was a Scottish soldier, businessman and Conservative politician.

Forbes was the only son of Atholl Laurence Cunyngham Forbes, 21st Lord Forbes, and his wife Lady Mabel, daughter of Thomas Francis Anson, 3rd Earl of Lichfield, and was educated at Harrow and the Royal Military College, Sandhurst. He served in the Second World War as a Major in the Grenadier Guards and was wounded. Between 1947 and 1948 he was Military Assistant to the High Commissioner for Palestine. Forbes succeeded his father in the lordship in 1953. In 1955 he was elected a Scottish representative peer and took his seat on the Conservative benches in the House of Lords. He was the last surviving person to have sat as a Scottish Representative Peer.

He served under Harold Macmillan as Minister of State for Scotland from 1958 to 1959. Apart from his participation in national politics he was also a member of the Alford District Council from 1955 to 1958 and served as chairman of the River Don district board from 1962 to 1972. In 1955 he was a justice of the peace for Aberdeenshire and in 1958 a deputy lieutenant. Forbes has later been involved in business, notably as a Director of Grampian Television from 1960 to 1988, as Deputy Chairman of Tennent Caledonian Breweries from 1964 to 1974 and as Chairman of Rolawn Ltd from 1975 to 1998. He was appointed a KBE in 1960.

== Personal life ==
Lord Forbes married the Hon. Rosemary Katharine, daughter of Gustavus William Hamilton-Russell, 9th Viscount Boyne, in 1942. They had two sons and one daughter: the eldest son, Malcolm Nigel Forbes, 23rd Lord Forbes, resides at Castle Forbes. Lady Forbes died in 2019, at the age of 98.

== Sources ==
- Kidd, Charles & Williamson, David (eds.) (1990) Debrett's Peerage and Baronetage (1990 edition). New York: St Martin's Press, ISBN 0333378245
- Who's Who 2007: An Annual Biographical Dictionary. London: A. & C. Black

Political offices
Preceded by Thomas Galbraith	Minister of State for Scotland; 1958–1959	Succeeded by Jack Browne
Peerage of Scotland
Preceded by Atholl Laurence Cunyngham Forbes	Lord Forbes; 1953–2013	Succeeded by Malcolm Nigel Forbes
