= James White (Scottish politician) =

British politician

James White (10 April 1922, Glasgow – 19 February 2009) was a British Labour Party politician. White was Member of Parliament (MP) for Glasgow Pollok from the 1970 general election to the 1987 general election, when he retired. He served in the Eighth Army under Field Marshal Montgomery during World War II. White was solidly anti-abortion and devoted many efforts to limiting it; for example, sponsoring legislation to tighten the restrictions on the Abortion Act 1967.

In 1970 White was elected to the House of Commons for Glasgow Pollok, defeating the Conservative incumbent MP Esmond Wright who had won the seat at a 1967 by-election. In 1975 White introduced a bill in Parliament, the Abortion Amendment Bill, to make abortion more difficult to access. A demonstration was arranged to protest at his proposed restriction to the then legal access to abortion. This demonstration led to the formation of National Abortion Campaign to advocate in favour of abortion rights.

He died on 19 February 2009.

Parliament of the United Kingdom
Preceded by Esmond Wright	Member of Parliament for Glasgow Pollok; 1970–1987	Succeeded by Jimmy Dunnachie
