= John Smith, Baron Kirkhill =

Scottish politician (1930–2023)

The Right Honourable The Lord Kirkhill
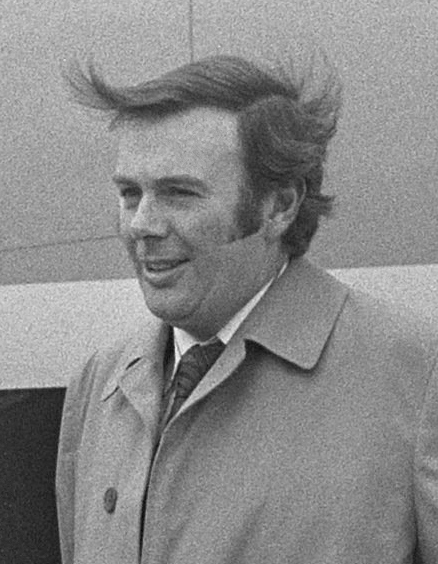
- John Smith in 1974

Member of the House of Lords
- Lord Temporal
- Life peerage 17 July 1975 – 30 April 2018

Minister of State for Scotland
- In office 8 August 1975 – 15 December 1978
- Monarch: Elizabeth II
- Prime Minister: Harold Wilson; James Callaghan
- Preceded by: The Lord Hughes
- Succeeded by: Gregor Mackenzie

Lord Provost of Aberdeen
- In office 1971–1975
- Preceded by: James Lamond
- Succeeded by: Robert Lennox

Personal details
- Born: John Farquharson Smith; 7 May 1930
- Died: 21 March 2023 (aged 92)
- Party: Labour
- Spouse: Frances Reid
- Children: 1

John Farquharson Smith, Baron Kirkhill (7 May 1930 – 21 March 2023) was a British Labour politician, life peer and member of the House of Lords. He was Lord Provost of Aberdeen from 1971 to 1975 and served as Minister of State for Scotland from 8 August 1975 to 15 December 1978 in the governments of Wilson and Callaghan. Smith was created a life peer as Baron Kirkhill, of Kirkhill in the District of the City of Aberdeen on 17 July 1975.

== Education and early career ==
John Smith was educated at Robert Gordon's College in Aberdeen, where he chaired a 'playground parliament' rather than play sport. Before entering politics Smith was manager of the Aberdeen branch of the Dunfermline Building Society. As a councillor he fought to save the listed 1842 New Market in Aberdeen, designed by Archibald Simpson.

Kirkhill was Chairman of the North of Scotland Hydro-Electric Board from 1979 to 1982.

From 1987 to 2000 he was a delegate to the parliamentary assembly of the Council of Europe.

He retired from the House of Lords on 30 April 2018.

He was a life-long fan of Aberdeen FC, having attended his first match aged 4 on his father's shoulders. In 1980 he spoke at a testimonial for Joe Harper, Aberdeen FC's forward.

Kirkhill died on 21 March 2023, at the age of 92. He was survived by Lady Kirkhill (Frances Reid) and a step-daughter.

== Sources ==
- Who's Who in Scotland, 2008
- http://biographies.parliament.uk/parliament/default.asp?id=26852%5B%5D

Civic offices
Preceded by James Lamond	Lord Provost of Aberdeen; 1971–1975	Succeeded by Robert Lennox
