= Alex Garrow =

British politician (1923–1966)

Alexander Garrow (12 March 1923 – 16 December 1966) was a Labour politician in the United Kingdom. He was elected Member of Parliament (MP) for Glasgow Pollok at the 1964 general election, was re-elected in 1966 but died later the same year, at the age of 43.

Known in The House for being an MP who was not committed to personal advancement, he gave up his pay rise to the pensioners in 1964 along with another Glasgow Labour MP. He also was a key member of Glasgow City Council Transport sub-committee who helped introduce Atlantean One Man Operated buses into the city.

His swansong was, unfortunately, attempting to find a new permanent home for The Burrell Collection which, until the opening of a dedicated museum in Pollok Estate, was housed in Pollok House, Kelvin Grove Art Gallery and Museum and some dusty storerooms in the latter.

He paired with Teddy, later Sir Edward, Taylor.

Parliament of the United Kingdom
| Preceded by Sir John George | Member of Parliament for Glasgow Pollok; 1964–1966 | Succeeded by Prof. Esmond Wright |
