= William Hughes, Baron Hughes =

English politician

The Right Honourable The Lord Hughes CBE PC

Minister of State for Scotland
- In office 8 March 1974 – 8 August 1975
- Monarch: Elizabeth II
- Prime Minister: Harold Wilson
- Preceded by: The Lord Polwarth
- Succeeded by: The Lord Kirkhill
- In office 13 October 1969 – 19 June 1970
- Monarch: Elizabeth II
- Prime Minister: Harold Wilson
- Preceded by: New appointment
- Succeeded by: The Baroness Tweedsmuir of Belhelvie

Parliamentary Under-Secretary of State for Scotland
- In office 21 October 1964 – 13 October 1969
- Monarch: Elizabeth II
- Prime Minister: Harold Wilson
- Preceded by: Priscilla Buchan
- Succeeded by: Bruce Millan

Member of the House of Lords Lord Temporal
- In office 7 February 1961 – 31 December 1999; Life Peerage

Personal details
- Born: William Hughes; 22 January 1911 Dundee, Scotland
- Died: 31 December 1999 (aged 88) Comrie, Perth and Kinross, Scotland
- Party: Labour
- Spouse: Christian Gordon (m. 1951; died 1994)
- Children: 2
- Occupation: Politician

William Hughes, Baron Hughes CBE PC (22 January 1911 – 31 December 1999), was a Scottish Labour party politician who served in the governments of Harold Wilson.

== Background ==
Hughes was born in Dundee, and was elected to Dundee Town Council at the age of 22. In 1954 he became Lord Provost of Dundee, a post he held until 1960, while he remained a councillor until 1961. He was also a Justice of the Peace for the city from 1943 until 1974. In the Second World War Hughes was Dundee's civil defense controller until 1943, when he joined the armed forces. He was commissioned in 1944, becoming a Captain by the end of the conflict. He served in the Royal Army Ordnance Corps in India. Burma and Borneo. He stood in the 1945 and 1950 general elections as the Labour Party's candidate for Perth (known as Perth and East Perthshire from 1950), but was not elected, before becoming a life peer on 7 February 1961 as Baron Hughes, of Hawkhill in the City of Dundee, Scotland.

== House of Lords ==
Hughes resigned as councillor in March 1961, as he felt that 'he could not guarantee to be a fully effective member' of the body following his appointment to the House of Lords.

In Harold Wilson's first government, he served under Scottish Secretary Willie Ross as Under-Secretary of State for Scotland from 1964 to 1969, and then as Minister of State for Scotland from 1969 to 1970 and again from 1974 to 1975. He was made a Privy Councillor in 1970. His obituary in The Herald noted he 'played a key role in persuading the government to proceed with the Tay Road Bridge, at the time the longest road bridge in Europe'. While serving in government, he also laid the foundation stone for Ninewells Hospital on 9 September 1965.

Hughes chaired both the Glenrothes and East Kilbride development corporations, and was also chairman of a royal commission on reforming Scottish legal services. After leaving ministerial office he remained an active peer and was noted for his attacks on the Thatcher and Major governments, on issues such as the introduction of the Poll Tax in Scotland, and Conservative claims about the possible economic impact of Scottish home rule.

== Personal life and death ==
Hughes married Christian Gordon in 1951; they had two daughters. His wife died in 1994, and Hughes died at his home in Comrie, Perth and Kinross, on 31 December 1999, at the age of 88.

== Honours ==
His honours included the OBE in 1942, raised to a CBE in 1956, receiving the Légion d'honneur (Chevalier) in 1958 and becoming a Privy Counsellor in 1970. He was also appointed as Deputy Lieutenant of the City of Dundee in 1992.
