= Esmond Wright =

English historian (1915–2003)

Esmond Wright (5 November 1915, Newcastle upon Tyne – 9 August 2003, Masham, North Yorkshire) was an English historian of the United States, Director of the Institute of United States Studies at the University of London from 1971 to 1983, a television personality, author, and a Conservative politician.

Wright was educated at Heaton Grammar School in Newcastle upon Tyne, before winning an open scholarship to Durham University and, in 1938, a Commonwealth Fund Fellowship to the University of Virginia. Wright joined the University of Glasgow in 1946 as a lecturer in History. In 1957 he was appointed Professor of Modern History, a post he held until his election to parliament ten years later. His students at Glasgow included future Labour Party Leader John Smith and Donald Dewar, later the first First Minister of Scotland. During this time he became known in both Scotland and England with his obituary in The Independent describing him as one of Britain's 'early "media dons"'.

In a 1967 by-election, he was returned as a Conservative Member of Parliament for the previously Labour-held seat of Glasgow Pollok. Wright defeated Dick Douglas, who would later have two spells as a Labour MP and defect to the Scottish National Party. Wright reportedly had 'no strong political ambitions' and had apparently not expected to win the contest. He was defeated by Labour's James White in the 1970 General Election. Tam Dalyell believed had Wright retained his seat, he might well have been a Treasury minister in the Heath Ministry.

After his defeat Wright returned to academia becoming Director of the Institute of US Studies and Professor of American History at the University of London in 1971, a post he held until 1983. He was also Principal of Swinton Conservative College in Masham from 1972 until 1976.

He was awarded the Benjamin Franklin Medal in 1988, reportedly, the award that gave him 'greatest pleasure'. In 1981 he delivered the British Academy's Sarah Tryphena Phillips Lecture in American Literature and History. He was elected to the American Philosophical Society in 1991.

== Works ==
Wright's publications include:

- Washington and the American Revolution, 1957.
- Fabric of Freedom, 1763-1800, Hill and Wang, New York, 1961.
- The McGraw-Hill illustrated world history, 1964.
- Benjamin Franklin and American Independence, 1966.
- The Modern World, 1969.
- Benjamin Franklin; a profile, 1970.
- The Ancient World, 1974.
- A Tug of Loyalties: Anglo-American Relations, 1765–85, 1975.
- Red, White and True Blue: The Loyalists in the Revolution by Conference on the American Loyalists, 1976.
- The Expanding World, 1979.
- The Medieval and Renaissance World, 1979.
- The Fire of Liberty, editor, The Folio Society, London 1983.
- History of the World. The Last Five Hundred Years, editor, Bonaza Books, New York 1981. 1984.
- Franklin of Philadelphia, Harvard University Press, 1986.
- The American Guide to Britain, 1987.
- Benjamin Franklin: His Life as He Wrote It, compiler and editor, The Folio Society, London 1989.
- The Search for Liberty: From Origins to Independence, 1994.
- An Empire for Liberty: From Washington to Lincoln, 1995.
- The American Dream: From Reconstruction to Reagan, 1996.

Parliament of the United Kingdom
Preceded by Alex Garrow	Member of Parliament for Glasgow Pollok; 1967–1970	Succeeded by James White
