= John George (Conservative politician) =

British coalminer and politician

Sir John George KBE CStJ
- George, taken November 1959.

Member of Parliament for Glasgow Pollok
- In office 1955–1964
- Preceded by: Thomas Galbraith
- Succeeded by: Alex Garrow

Chairman of the Scottish Unionist Party
- In office 1963–1965
- Succeeded by: Sir John Gilmour, 3rd Baronet

Personal details
- Born: 16 October 1901 Fife, Scotland, United Kingdom
- Died: 14 October 1972 (aged 70)
- Party: Scottish Unionist Party

Sir John Clarke George, KBE, CStJ (16 October 1901 – 14 October 1972) was a British coalminer and politician. He was one of a very small number of Conservative Members of Parliament to have worked as a miner.

== Early life ==
George's father, also called John Clarke George, was a miner from Fife. After attending Ballingry Public School until the age of 14, George began work in the coal mines. However, he later trained for management, and rose through the ranks so that by 1938 he was appointed manager of New Cumnock Collieries.

== Business life ==
In 1946, he left the mining industry (the act nationalising the industry was passed that year), and became manager of Alloa Glass Works. At this point, he became active in politics as a Unionist and, in 1949, he was elected to Clackmannanshire County Council. He was an unsuccessful parliamentary candidate in South Ayrshire in the 1950 general election, but was elected to Alloa Town Council in 1951. He was awarded the CBE in 1952.

== Constitutional problem ==
At the 1955 general election, George was elected to Parliament as a Unionist for Glasgow Pollok (the Scottish Unionists took the Conservative whip). Almost immediately, he was the trigger for a minor constitutional crisis when it was observed that he was a director of Scottish Slate Industries, a nationalised industry, having been appointed by the Ministry of Works in February 1947. Although George had not received any remuneration, it was possible that it might be an "office of profit under the Crown" which would disqualify him from being an MP.

The matter was referred to a Select Committee, while the government rushed through a bill to change the law. The committee found that, under the law as it stood, George was disqualified. A bill to indemnify George from the consequences of having acted as an MP while disqualified, and to validate his election, was also passed.

== Parliamentary career ==
George often spoke about the mining industry in parliament. In 1957, he opposed the decontrol of rents which had been brought in by the Conservative government. However, this did not harm his career and in October 1959 he was appointed parliamentary secretary to the Ministry of Power with responsibility for the coal industry, a job he held until June 1962. In 1963, he was made a Knight Commander of the Order of the British Empire and appointed chairman of the Unionist Party in Scotland.

He stood down from Parliament at the 1964 general election and retired from his party posts in 1965, returning to business as chairman of Scottish Rexco Ltd and Preswick Precision Products Ltd.

Parliament of the United Kingdom
Preceded by Thomas Galbraith	Member of Parliament for Glasgow Pollok; 1955–1964	Succeeded by Alex Garrow
