= 1940 Glasgow Pollok by-election =

UK parliamentary by-election

The 1940 Glasgow Pollok by-election was held on 30 April 1940 in the Glasgow Pollok constituency of the Parliament of the United Kingdom. The by-election was caused by the death of the previous MP, Sir John Gilmour.

As with other by-elections in the war period, the incumbent party was given a clear run by the other major parties.

It was won by Thomas Galbraith of the Unionist Party (Scotland). His only opponent came from a local Labour party - which had been disaffiliated by the party's National Executive Committee for breaking the electoral truce - and stood as an Independent Labour candidate.

By-election 1940: Glasgow Pollok
Party	Candidate	Votes	%	±%
Unionist	Thomas Galbraith	17,850	88.1	+16.0
Independent Labour	John Nicholson	2,401	11.9	New
Majority		15,449	76.2	+32.0
Turnout		20,251		
Unionist hold		Swing		
