= Jimmy Dunnachie =

British politician (1930–1997)

James Francis Dunnachie JP (17 November 1930 – 7 September 1997), known as Jimmy Dunnachie, was a British politician from Scotland. He served as a Labour Party Member of Parliament from 1987 until 1997.

== Early life ==
Dunnachie was born in Glasgow and educated at St Margaret's School in Kinning Park. His father was a ship's rigger and upon leaving school, he was apprenticed to Fairfield's yard on the River Clyde before becoming a fitter at the Rolls-Royce plant at Hillington in 1953. He was already active in the Amalgamated Engineering Union as a shop steward, and joined the Labour Party in 1967.

== Political career ==
Dunnachie began his political career on Glasgow Corporation in 1972 in Pollokshaws ward. He worked on slum clearance as Chairman of the Clearance and Rehabilitation Committee; he lost his seat in 1977 when the Labour vote in Glasgow slumped. From 1978 he transferred to Strathclyde Regional Council and became Chair of the Social Work committee.

In the runup to the 1987 general election, Dunnachie was selected to follow James White as Labour candidate for Glasgow Pollok by 50 votes to 41 for Dave Churchley. Churchley was a member of the Militant tendency and there was some surprise at his failure to win the selection owing to the extent to which the local party was dominated by Militant supporters. An earlier round of voting had seen the Militant delegates vote for Dunnachie over Bob Gillespie, a non-Militant left-winger, which was speculated as deriving from their belief that Dunnachie would be easier for Churchley to beat; however it caused resentment among Gillespie's supporters.

== Parliament ==
Dunnachie easily held the seat in 1987. He was re-elected in 1992, withstanding a challenge from Tommy Sheridan of Scottish Militant Labour who came second. In Parliament Dunnachie was a relatively quiet presence, usually allying with the left. He was appointed as an opposition Whip in 1988 and served until 1992, but opposed Neil Kinnock's move to drop Labour's commitment to unilateral nuclear disarmament. Initially he declared his intention not to pay his Community Charge (or Poll Tax) although he was never prosecuted for the offence, and observers have concluded that he must have decided not to fight.

Dunnachie was a strong opponent of animal testing of cosmetics and of fluoridation of drinking water. His Catholicism showed in votes in favour of Bills which restricted abortion and against any lowering in the age of consent for homosexual sex, and he also opposed a deregulation of Sunday trading in 1993. He supported Tony Blair in the Labour leadership election in 1994 (and John Prescott as Deputy Leader). That year it was noted that he was one of the few MPs who had made no Parliamentary speeches in the previous year.

== Govan selection ==
Dunnachie's attendance suffered as the Parliament went on due to persistent ill-health. However he did not announce his retirement and when his constituency was redrawn in boundary changes, declared his intention to seek selection in Glasgow Govan. This move made the selection in Govan much more open and eventually doomed the chances of Mike Watson who was the sitting MP for Glasgow Central, the nomination going instead to Mohammad Sarwar.

In the event, Dunnachie died of cancer only a few months after the election, at the age of 66.

Parliament of the United Kingdom
Preceded by James White	Member of Parliament for Glasgow Pollok; 1987–1997	Succeeded by Ian Davidson
