= Ian Davidson (Scottish politician) =

British politician (born 1950)

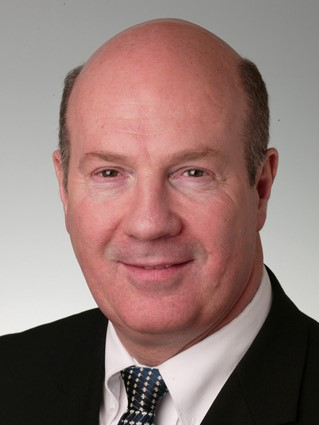
- Studio portrait, 2011

Chair of the Scottish Affairs Select Committee
- In office 17 May 2010 – 30 March 2015
- Preceded by: Mohammad Sarwar
- Succeeded by: Pete Wishart

Member of Parliament for Glasgow South West Glasgow Pollok (1997–2005)
- In office 1 May 1997 – 30 March 2015
- Preceded by: Jimmy Dunnachie
- Succeeded by: Chris Stephens

Member of Parliament for Glasgow Govan
- In office 9 April 1992 – 8 April 1997
- Preceded by: Jim Sillars
- Succeeded by: Mohammad Sarwar

Personal details
- Born: Ian Graham Davidson; 8 September 1950 (age 75) Jedburgh, Roxburghshire, Scotland
- Party: Labour Co-operative
- Spouse: Morag Mackinnon (m. 1978)
- Children: 2

Ian Graham Davidson (born 8 September 1950) is a Scottish politician who served as chair of the Scottish Affairs Select Committee from 2010 to 2015. A member of the Scottish Labour Party and Co-operative Party, he was Member of Parliament (MP) for Glasgow South West, formerly Glasgow Pollok, from 1992 to 2015.

Davidson previously worked as a Community Service Manager and for Janey Buchan when she was a Member of the European Parliament. In 2017 and 2019, he was Scottish Labour's parliamentary candidate in Berwickshire, Roxburgh and Selkirk. In May 2026, whilst not a party member, he became an advisor to Reform UK Scotland.

== Career ==
Davidson was born in Jedburgh, and was educated at Jedburgh Grammar School, Galashiels Academy and the University of Edinburgh, where he was involved in student politics. After graduating he studied for a teaching qualification at Jordanhill College, which led him to move to Glasgow. From 1973 to 1974, Davidson was Chair of the National Organisation of Labour Students. He served as a councillor on Strathclyde Regional Council for the Drumoyne area from 1978 to 1992, (Note: Davidson represented Drumoyne/Fairfield from 1978 to 1982, and Drumoyne/Govan thereafter.) and was convenor of its education committee. He combined his duties on the council with part-time roles working as a personal assistant and researcher for Janey Buchan (1978–85) and as a manager for Community Service Volunteers (1985–92).

He became an MP in 1992, originally for the seat of Glasgow Govan and, following boundary changes, for Glasgow Pollok from 1997 to 2005. After further major boundary changes across Scotland, Davidson stood in the 2005 general election for the new constituency of Glasgow South West, where he won the second biggest swing to Labour in Scotland. He was a member of the Public Accounts Select committee and has lobbied to support the Scottish shipbuilding industry. He was also secretary of the Trade Union Group of Labour MPs.

In 2002 he criticised Prince Michael of Kent for 'squatting' in Kensington Palace. More recently he has criticised the Prince of Wales over his personal finances. He was the chair of Labour Against the Euro before it ceased campaigning following the 2003 decision by Gordon Brown that the five economic tests for Britain to join the euro had not been met.

During the debate in the House of Commons over the decision whether to have a referendum over the EU Treaty of Lisbon (5 March 2008), Davidson drew jeers from his Labour colleagues for branding New Labour supporters "Maoists and Trotskyists". Davidson was putting forward the case for disobeying the party line and voting for a referendum.

During the 2009–10 expenses scandal, it emerged that Davidson claimed £87,699 in the four years to 2007, significantly below the maximum permitted.

He served as chair of the Scotland Office Select committee from 2010 to 2015. In June 2011, he accused the Scottish National Party of "narrow neo-fascism". The choice of language resulted in the Labour Party distancing itself from Davidson's comments, saying the use of the word "neo-fascist" was unacceptable, even in the heat of debate, and Angus Robertson to call on him to resign as chair of the Scottish Affairs Select Committee.

On 25 October 2011 it was alleged that Davidson had threatened to inflict "a doing" upon fellow committee member Eilidh Whiteford. Davidson subsequently made an apology to the committee for his use of the word "doing", repeating an apology given to Dr Whiteford while the relevant committee meeting was breaking up. He insisted that the phrase "having had a doing" had referred to the rebukes Dr Whiteford had received from himself and several other MPs and was in the context of stopping debate before additional committee members had the opportunity further to scold Dr Whiteford. Liberal Democrat, Labour and Conservative committee members all stated that no threats were made. The 14 other people present, MPs and staff, were all interviewed by relevant whips and parliamentary authorities. None corroborated Dr Whiteford's allegations. After this investigation the Labour Party stated that it amounted to a "smear campaign" against Davidson due to the forthcoming investigations chaired by Davidson into the SNP's referendum proposal.

A member of the SNP politician Joan McAlpine's staff, Gail Lythgoe, then married to future First Minister Humza Yousaf, was found to have emailed a women's equality group, supporting Whiteford and alleging that Davidson has a history of bullying women and called on them to demonstrate against him whilst asking them not to reveal SNP involvement in its instigation. The email was later leaked and Lythgoe publicly apologised for making unsubstantiated allegations, with the Labour Party alleging that this was a result of an SNP "dirty tricks campaign" against Davidson and calling for an investigation.

In May 2015 he lost his seat to Chris Stephens of the SNP. In April 2017, Davidson announced his intention to stand in the 2017 general election in the Berwickshire, Roxburgh and Selkirk seat. He was chosen because of his close personal connections with the area, having been born and raised nearby. He was unsuccessful but increased the Labour vote enough to secure the party's deposit, which had been lost by the party's candidate in the previous election. Davidson saw his party's vote rise by 67% to 4,519 or 8.6% of the vote. In October 2019, following the announcement of a December general election, he was reselected as Labour's candidate, but failed to win the seat, losing his deposit.

Following the 2026 Scottish Parliament election, Davidson became an advisor to Reform UK Scotland leader Malcolm Offord.

== Political positions ==
Davidson is a supporter of Republic, a campaign to replace the British Monarchy with an elected head of state. A long-standing Eurosceptic, Davidson supported Britain's withdrawal from the European Union, and served on the board of Vote Leave, the official campaign group in support of Brexit.

== Personal life ==
Davidson has been married to Morag Mackinnon since 1978 and they have a son and a daughter (who died in 2018). Since leaving parliament in 2015, Davidson has started swimming competitively, winning a series of medals in the Masters Swimming competitions.

== Notes ==
Parliament of the United Kingdom
Preceded by Jim Sillars	Member of Parliament for Glasgow Govan; 1992–1997	Succeeded by Mohammad Sarwar
Preceded by Jimmy Dunnachie	Member of Parliament for Glasgow Pollok; 1997–2005	Constituency abolished
New constituency	Member of Parliament for Glasgow South West; 2005–2015	Succeeded by Chris Stephens
