= Glasgow Pollok (UK Parliament constituency) =

British Parliamentary constituency

- Former burgh constituency for the House of Commons
- Subdivisions of Scotland: County of city of Glasgow; City of Glasgow district Glasgow City council area

1918–2005
- Seats: One
- Created from: East Renfrewshire, Glasgow Govan and Glasgow Tradeston
- Replaced by: Glasgow South West

Glasgow Pollok was a burgh constituency represented in the House of Commons of the Parliament of the United Kingdom from 1918 until 2005, when it was replaced by Glasgow South West. It elected one Member of Parliament (MP) using the first-past-the-post voting system.

== Boundaries ==
1918–1950: "That portion of the city which is bounded by a line commencing at a point on the municipal boundary at the centre line of the Glasgow and Paisley Joint Railway, thence eastward along the centre line of the said Glasgow and Paisley Joint Railway and the Caledonian Railway to the centre line of Shields Road, thence southward along the centre line of Shields Road to the centre line of the Glasgow and South Western Railway (Paisley Canal Line), thence, eastward along the centre line of the said Glasgow and South Western Railway to the centre line of Eglinton Street, thence southward along the centre line of Eglinton Street and Victoria Road to the centre line of Queen's Drive, thence southward along the centre line of the main avenue in the Queen's Park to the centre line of Langside Road, thence south-westward along the centre line of Langside Road to the centre line of Millbrae Road, thence south-westward along the centre line of Millbrae Road and Langside Road to the centre line of the River Cart at Millbrae Bridge, thence westward and north-westward along the centre line of the River Cart to the centre line of Kilmarnock Road, thence southward along the centre line of Kilmarnock Road to the municipal boundary, thence northwestward, south-westward, northward, westward and northward along the municipal boundary to the point of commencement."

1950–1955: The Camphill, Pollokshaws and Pollokshields wards of the county of the city of Glasgow.

1955–1983: The Camphill and Pollokshaws wards of the county of the city of Glasgow, and the part of the Pollokshields ward which is not included in the Craigton constituency.

1983–1997: Electoral divisions 31, 32 and 33 in the City of Glasgow.

1997–2005: Electoral divisions 28 (Hillington/Cardonald), 29 (Crookston/Mosspark) and 30 (South Pollok/Arden) in the City of Glasgow.

== Members of Parliament ==
| Election | Member | Party |
|---|---|---|
| 1918 | Sir John Gilmour | Unionist |
| 1940 by-election | Thomas Galbraith | Unionist |
| 1955 | Sir John George | Unionist |
| 1964 | Alex Garrow | Labour |
| 1967 by-election | Esmond Wright | Conservative |
| 1970 | James White | Labour |
| 1987 | Jimmy Dunnachie | Labour |
| 1997 | Ian Davidson | Labour Co-operative |
| 2005 | constituency abolished | |

== Election results ==
=== Elections of the 2000s ===
General election 2001: Glasgow Pollok
| Party | Candidate | Votes | % | ±% |
|---|---|---|---|---|
| Labour Co-op | Ian Davidson | 15,497 | 61.3 | +1.4 |
| SNP | David Ritchie | 4,229 | 16.7 | −1.2 |
| Scottish Socialist | Keith Baldassara | 2,522 | 10.0 | −1.1 |
| Liberal Democrats | Isabel Nelson | 1,612 | 6.4 | +2.9 |
| Conservative | Rory O’Brien | 1,417 | 5.6 | −0.4 |
| Majority | | 11,268 | 44.6 | +2.6 |
| Turnout | | 25,277 | 51.4 | −15.1 |
| Labour Co-op hold | | Swing | | |

=== Elections of the 1990s ===
General election 1997: Glasgow Pollok
| Party | Candidate | Votes | % | ±% |
|---|---|---|---|---|
| Labour Co-op | Ian Davidson | 19,653 | 59.9 | +16.5 |
| SNP | David Logan | 5,862 | 17.9 | +2.3 |
| Scottish Socialist | Tommy Sheridan | 3,639 | 11.1 | −8.2 |
| Conservative | Edwin S. Hamilton | 1,979 | 6.0 | −9.8 |
| Liberal Democrats | David M. Jago | 1,137 | 3.5 | −2.4 |
| ProLife Alliance | Monica Gott | 380 | 1.2 | New |
| Referendum | Derek G. Haldane | 152 | 0.5 | New |
| Majority | | 13,791 | 42.0 | +17.9 |
| Turnout | | 32,802 | 66.5 | −4.2 |
| Labour Co-op hold | | Swing | | |

General election 1992: Glasgow Pollok
| Party | Candidate | Votes | % | ±% |
|---|---|---|---|---|
| Labour | Jimmy Dunnachie | 14,170 | 43.4 | −19.7 |
| Scottish Militant Labour | Tommy Sheridan | 6,287 | 19.3 | New |
| Conservative | Russell Gray | 5,147 | 15.8 | +1.5 |
| SNP | George A. Leslie | 5,107 | 15.6 | +6.0 |
| Liberal Democrats | David M. Jago | 1,932 | 5.9 | −6.1 |
| Majority | | 7,883 | 24.1 | −24.7 |
| Turnout | | 32,643 | 70.7 | −1.0 |
| Labour hold | | Swing | | |

=== Elections of the 1980s ===
General election 1987: Glasgow Pollok
| Party | Candidate | Votes | % | ±% |
|---|---|---|---|---|
| Labour | Jimmy Dunnachie | 23,239 | 63.1 | +10.9 |
| Conservative | Gillian French | 5,256 | 14.3 | −6.2 |
| Liberal | James Shearer | 4,445 | 12.0 | −5.4 |
| SNP | Andrew Doig | 3,528 | 9.6 | −0.3 |
| Green | Derek Fogg | 362 | 1.0 | New |
| Majority | | 17,983 | 48.8 | +17.1 |
| Turnout | | 36,830 | 71.7 | +3.5 |
| Labour hold | | Swing | +8.6 | |

General election 1983: Glasgow Pollok
| Party | Candidate | Votes | % | ±% |
|---|---|---|---|---|
| Labour | James White | 18,973 | 52.2 | −1.4 |
| Conservative | Jackson Carlaw | 7,441 | 20.5 | −8.2 |
| Liberal | George McKell | 6,308 | 17.4 | +8.4 |
| SNP | Frank Hannigan | 3,585 | 9.9 | −4.5 |
| Majority | | 11,532 | 31.7 | +12.2 |
| Turnout | | 36,307 | 68.2 | −5.7 |
| Labour hold | | Swing | | |

=== Elections of the 1970s ===
General election 1979: Glasgow Pollok
| Party | Candidate | Votes | % | ±% |
|---|---|---|---|---|
| Labour | James White | 21,420 | 49.25 | +5.78 |
| Conservative | David Anderson Roser | 12,928 | 29.72 | +2.75 |
| SNP | Angus McIntosh | 4,187 | 9.63 | −14.65 |
| Liberal | George McKell | 3,946 | 9.07 | +3.79 |
| Independent Labour | NG Armstrong | 869 | 2.00 | New |
| National Front | I Skinner | 104 | 0.24 | New |
| Independent Democrat | RB Hilton | 41 | 0.09 | New |
| Majority | | 8,492 | 19.53 | +3.04 |
| Turnout | | 43,494 | 73.68 | +1.33 |
| Labour hold | | Swing | +1.52 | |

General election October 1974: Glasgow Pollok
| Party | Candidate | Votes | % | ±% |
|---|---|---|---|---|
| Labour | James White | 18,695 | 43.46 | −2.65 |
| Conservative | Gerald Malone | 11,604 | 26.98 | −11.69 |
| SNP | David MacQuarrie | 10,441 | 24.27 | +9.88 |
| Liberal | William Clark Todd | 2,274 | 5.29 | New |
| Majority | | 7,091 | 16.48 | |
| Turnout | | 43,014 | 72.35 | |
| Labour hold | | Swing | +4.52 | |

General election February 1974: Glasgow Pollok
| Party | Candidate | Votes | % | ±% |
|---|---|---|---|---|
| Labour | James White | 21,090 | 46.11 | |
| Conservative | Ian Lang | 17,684 | 38.67 | |
| SNP | Matthew D'Arcy Conyers | 6,584 | 14.40 | |
| Communist | Thomas Biggam | 377 | 0.82 | New |
| Majority | | 3,406 | 7.44 | |
| Turnout | | 45,735 | 77.46 | |
| Labour hold | | Swing | | |

General election 1970: Glasgow Pollok
| Party | Candidate | Votes | % | ±% |
|---|---|---|---|---|
| Labour | James White | 19,311 | 46.25 | |
| Conservative | Esmond Wright | 18,708 | 44.81 | |
| SNP | George Leslie | 3,733 | 8.94 | N/A |
| Majority | | 603 | 1.44 | |
| Turnout | | 41,752 | 72.46 | |
| Labour hold | | Swing | | |

=== Elections of the 1960s ===
1967 Glasgow Pollok by-election
| Party | Candidate | Votes | % | ±% |
|---|---|---|---|---|
| Conservative | Esmond Wright | 14,270 | 36.92 | −10.64 |
| Labour | Dick Douglas | 12,069 | 31.22 | −21.22 |
| SNP | George Leslie | 10,884 | 28.16 | New |
| Liberal | Ian D Miller | 735 | 1.90 | New |
| Communist | Alexander C. Murray | 694 | 1.80 | New |
| Majority | | 2,201 | 5.70 | N/A |
| Turnout | | 38,652 | | |
| Conservative gain from Labour | | Swing | | |

General election 1966: Glasgow Pollok
| Party | Candidate | Votes | % | ±% |
|---|---|---|---|---|
| Labour | Alex Garrow | 21,257 | 52.44 | |
| Conservative | Patrick Tobias Telfer Smollett | 19,282 | 47.56 | |
| Majority | | 1,975 | 4.88 | |
| Turnout | | 40,539 | | |
| Labour hold | | Swing | | |

General election 1964: Glasgow Pollok
| Party | Candidate | Votes | % | ±% |
|---|---|---|---|---|
| Labour | Alex Garrow | 18,089 | 44.61 | +3.38 |
| Unionist | Robert D Kernohan | 17,793 | 43.88 | −14.89 |
| Liberal | Roger N Straker | 4,670 | 11.52 | New |
| Majority | | 296 | 0.73 | N/A |
| Turnout | | 40,552 | 77.84 | −1.08 |
| Registered electors | | 52,094 | | |
| Labour gain from Unionist | | Swing | +9.14 | |

=== Elections in the 1950s ===
General election 1959: Glasgow Pollok
| Party | Candidate | Votes | % | ±% |
|---|---|---|---|---|
| Unionist | John George | 24,338 | 58.77 | −2.54 |
| Labour | John M Smith | 17,072 | 41.23 | +2.54 |
| Majority | | 7,266 | 17.54 | −5.08 |
| Turnout | | 41,410 | 78.92 | +3.43 |
| Registered electors | | 52,472 | | |
| Unionist hold | | Swing | -2.54 | |

General election 1955: Glasgow Pollok
| Party | Candidate | Votes | % | ±% |
|---|---|---|---|---|
| Unionist | John George | 23,975 | 61.31 | +5.87 |
| Labour | Alexander E Macarthur | 15,130 | 38.69 | −5.87 |
| Majority | | 8,845 | 22.62 | +11.74 |
| Turnout | | 39,105 | 75.49 | −6.98 |
| Registered electors | | 51,800 | | |
| Unionist hold | | Swing | +5.87 | |

General election 1951: Glasgow Pollok
| Party | Candidate | Votes | % | ±% |
|---|---|---|---|---|
| Unionist | Thomas Galbraith | 28,787 | 55.44 | −0.90 |
| Labour | John Smith Clarke | 23,136 | 44.56 | +5.73 |
| Majority | | 5,651 | 10.88 | −6.64 |
| Turnout | | 51,923 | 82.47 | +1.16 |
| Registered electors | | 62,963 | | |
| Unionist hold | | Swing | -3.32 | |

General election 1950: Glasgow Pollok
| Party | Candidate | Votes | % | ±% |
|---|---|---|---|---|
| Unionist | Thomas Galbraith | 20,052 | 56.34 | −7.11 |
| Labour | John Smith Clarke | 17,263 | 38.83 | +5.23 |
| Liberal | Alexander Anderson | 2,148 | 4.83 | New |
| Majority | | 7,789 | 17.51 | −14.32 |
| Turnout | | 44,463 | 81.31 | +13.00 |
| Registered electors | | 54,685 | | |
| Unionist hold | | Swing | -6.17 | |

=== Elections of the 1940s ===
General election 1945: Glasgow Pollok
| Party | Candidate | Votes | % | ±% |
|---|---|---|---|---|
| Unionist | Thomas Galbraith | 20,072 | 63.45 | −8.65 |
| Labour | Alexander Burns Mackay | 10,630 | 33.60 | +5.70 |
| Common Wealth | William John Voisey-Youldon | 932 | 2.95 | New |
| Majority | | 9,442 | 31.85 | −14.35 |
| Turnout | | 31,634 | 68.31 | −1.77 |
| Registered electors | | 46,312 | | |
| Unionist hold | | Swing | -7.18 | |

1940 Glasgow Pollok by-election
| Party | Candidate | Votes | % | ±% |
|---|---|---|---|---|
| Unionist | Thomas Galbraith | 17,850 | 88.1 | +16.0 |
| Independent Labour | John Nicholson | 2,401 | 11.9 | New |
| Majority | | 15,449 | 76.2 | +32.0 |
| Turnout | | 20,251 | | |
| Unionist hold | | Swing | | |

=== Elections of the 1930s ===
General election 1935: Glasgow Pollok
| Party | Candidate | Votes | % | ±% |
|---|---|---|---|---|
| Unionist | John Gilmour | 22,408 | 72.10 | −9.35 |
| Labour | James McInnes | 8,670 | 27.90 | +9.35 |
| Majority | | 13,738 | 44.20 | −18.70 |
| Turnout | | 31,078 | 70.08 | −7.07 |
| Registered electors | | 44,348 | | |
| Unionist hold | | Swing | -9.35 | |

General election 1931: Glasgow Pollok
| Party | Candidate | Votes | % | ±% |
|---|---|---|---|---|
| Unionist | John Gilmour | 27,772 | 81.45 | +12.3 |
| Labour | John Rankin | 6,323 | 18.55 | −12.2 |
| Majority | | 21,449 | 62.90 | +24.5 |
| Turnout | | 34,095 | 77.15 | +5.3 |
| Registered electors | | 44,192 | | |
| Unionist hold | | Swing | +12.25 | |

=== Elections of the 1920s ===
General election 1929: Glasgow Pollok
| Party | Candidate | Votes | % | ±% |
|---|---|---|---|---|
| Unionist | John Gilmour | 22,328 | 69.2 | −6.1 |
| Labour | Walter Muter | 9,936 | 30.8 | +6.1 |
| Majority | | 12,392 | 38.4 | −12.2 |
| Turnout | | 32,264 | 71.8 | −4.7 |
| Registered electors | | 44,945 | | |
| Unionist hold | | Swing | −6.1 | |

General election 1924: Glasgow Pollok
| Party | Candidate | Votes | % | ±% |
|---|---|---|---|---|
| Unionist | John Gilmour | 20,622 | 75.3 | +8.1 |
| Labour | John Rankin | 6,749 | 24.7 | −8.1 |
| Majority | | 13,873 | 50.6 | +16.2 |
| Turnout | | 27,371 | 76.5 | +10.5 |
| Registered electors | | 35,788 | | |
| Unionist hold | | Swing | +8.1 | |

General election 1923: Glasgow Pollok
| Party | Candidate | Votes | % | ±% |
|---|---|---|---|---|
| Unionist | John Gilmour | 14,013 | 67.2 | +3.3 |
| Labour | John Rankin | 6,836 | 32.8 | +8.1 |
| Majority | | 7,177 | 34.4 | −4.8 |
| Turnout | | 20,849 | 66.0 | −12.7 |
| Registered electors | | 31,612 | | |
| Unionist hold | | Swing | −2.4 | |

General election 1922: Glasgow Pollok
| Party | Candidate | Votes | % | ±% |
|---|---|---|---|---|
| Unionist | John Gilmour | 14,920 | 63.9 | N/A |
| Labour | Alexander Burns Mackay | 5,759 | 24.7 | New |
| Liberal | Thomas Randall Anderson | 2,658 | 11.4 | New |
| Majority | | 9,161 | 39.2 | N/A |
| Turnout | | 23,337 | 78.7 | N/A |
| Registered electors | | 29,670 | | |
| Unionist hold | | Swing | N/A | |

By-election, 1921: Glasgow Pollok
| Party | | Candidate | Votes | % | ±% |
|---|---|---|---|---|---|
| C | Unionist | John Gilmour | Unopposed | | |
| | Unionist hold | | | | |
C indicates candidate endorsed by the coalition government.

General election 1918: Glasgow Pollok
| Party | | Candidate | Votes | % | ±% |
|---|---|---|---|---|---|
| C | Unionist | John Gilmour | Unopposed | | |
| | Unionist win (new seat) | | | | |
C indicates candidate endorsed by the coalition government.

== See also ==
- Glasgow Pollok (Scottish Parliament constituency)
