= Thomas Galbraith, 1st Baron Strathclyde =

Scottish politician (1891–1985)

The Right Honourable The Lord Strathclyde PC
- Galbraith in 1945

Chairman of the North of Scotland Hydro-Electric Board
- In office Late 1950s – May 1967
- Preceded by: Lord Cooper
- Succeeded by: Tom Fraser

Minister of State for Scotland
- In office 7 April 1955 – 23 October 1958
- Prime Minister: Anthony Eden; Harold Macmillan
- Preceded by: The Earl of Home
- Succeeded by: The Lord Forbes
- In office 4 November 1951 – 5 April 1955
- Prime Minister: Winston Churchill
- Preceded by: John Robertson
- Succeeded by: Jack Browne
- In office 26 May 1945 – 26 July 1945
- Prime Minister: Winston Churchill
- Preceded by: Allan Chapman
- Succeeded by: George Buchanan

Member of the House of Lords Lord Temporal
- In office 5 May 1955 – 12 July 1985; Hereditary peerage
- Preceded by: Peerage created
- Succeeded by: The 2nd Baron Strathclyde

Member of Parliament for Glasgow Pollok
- In office 30 April 1940 – 4 May 1955
- Preceded by: Sir John Gilmour
- Succeeded by: John George

Personal details
- Born: 20 March 1891 Partick, Lanarkshire, Scotland
- Died: 12 July 1985 (aged 94) Mauchline, Ayrshire

Thomas Dunlop Galbraith, 1st Baron Strathclyde, PC (20 March 1891 – 12 July 1985), was a Scottish Unionist Party politician.

After serving in the Royal Navy, he became a chartered accountant and practised, 1925–70. He was elevated to the peerage in 1955 as Lord Strathclyde (of Barskimming in the County of Ayr), and died three decades later. As his eldest son, Sir Tam Galbraith, died in 1982, the barony was inherited by his grandson Thomas Galbraith, 2nd Baron Strathclyde.

== Early life and education ==
Galbraith was born into Clan Galbraith, which traces its roots to 12th-century laird Gilchrist Bretnach, the 15x great-grandfather of King George I. He was one of eight children born to surgeon William Brodie Galbraith FRFPSGlas FRCSE (1855–1942) and Annie Jack Dunlop (sister of Sir Thomas Dunlop, 1st Baronet). He had an older brother, Walter, and younger brothers William, David, Norman, Robert, and Alexander, and a younger sister, Annie.

Galbraith was educated at Glasgow Academy; Eastman's, Southsea; Royal Naval College, Osborne and Royal Naval College, Dartmouth.

== Royal Navy ==
Galbraith joined the Royal Navy in 1903. He was promoted to Lieutenant in 1913 and served aboard the battleships HMS Audacious (1869) and HMS Queen Elizabeth (1913) during the First World War. Three of his younger brothers were killed in the war while serving in the Highland Light Infantry: Capt. William Brodie Galbraith (1892–1915), David Boyd Galbraith (1894–1915) and Norman Dunlop Galbraith (1896–1918). He left the Royal Navy in 1922 and formally retired in 1925.

When the Second World War began, Galbraith joined the Scottish Naval Command. He was later sent to Washington, D.C. to represent the Admiralty, which was negotiating supplies prior to the enactment of Lend-Lease in 1941.

== Political career ==
Galbraith's political career began in local government where he served as a councillor on Glasgow Corporation from 1933 until 1940. For part of that time he was vice-chair of the Progressive Party. He served as Member of Parliament (MP) for Glasgow Pollok from 1940 to 1955, being originally elected at a by-election and then at the 1945, 1950 and 1951 general elections. He served as Under-Secretary of State for Scotland in Winston Churchill's caretaker government from May to July 1945.

He was made a peer on 4 May 1955, shortly before the 1955 general election, and took his seat in the House of Lords the following day. He served as a Minister of State at the Scottish Office until 1958. By 1964, Strathclyde was serving as chairman of the North of Scotland Hydro-Electric Board.

He was awarded the Freedom of Dingwall in 1965 and the Freedom of the City of Aberdeen in 1966.

== Marriage and children ==
On 2 December 1915, Strathclyde married Ida Jane Galloway, daughter of Thomas Galloway of Auchendrane House, Ayrshire. They had seven children, five of whom served in the Royal Navy. Their second son was killed during the Second World War in the English Channel while captaining the French submarine chaser Chasseur 6 that was hit by a German torpedo boat.

- Hon. Sir Thomas Galloway Dunlop Galbraith (10 March 1917 – 2 January 1982)
  - Thomas Galbraith, 2nd Baron Strathclyde
- Lt. William Brodie Galloway Galbraith RN (20 September 1918 – KIA 12 October 1940)
- Hon. James Muir Galloway Galbraith CBE FRICS (27 September 1920 – 4 October 2003)
- Hon. Ida Jean Galloway Galbraith (21 January 1922 – 9 February 2018)
- Hon. Norman Dunlop Galloway Galbraith (24 January 1925 – 24 June 2013)
- Hon. David Muir Galloway Galbraith (born 8 March 1928 – 12 August 2006)
- Hon. Heather Margaret Anne Galloway Galbraith (born 27 February 1930)

Lady Strathclyde died in June 1985. A month later, Strathclyde died at his estate at Barskimming, in Mauchline, Ayrshire, in 1985, and the barony passed to his grandson.

== Arms ==
Coat of arms of Thomas Galbraith, 1st Baron Strathclyde
Crest A Bear's Head erased Gules muzzled Argent Escutcheon Gules three Bears' Heads erased Argent muzzled Azure within a Bordure indented Or charged with three Mullets of the Third a Crescent of the Second for difference. Supporters Two Bears Gules muzzled Argent Motto Ab obice suavior ('Gentler because of the obstruction', alluding to the muzzled bear's head of the Clan Galbraith crest)

Parliament of the United Kingdom
Preceded by Sir John Gilmour, Bt	Member of Parliament for Glasgow Pollok; 1940–1955	Succeeded by John George
Political offices
Preceded by Joseph Westwood; Allan Chapman	Joint Under-Secretary of State for Scotland; 1945 with Allan Chapman	Succeeded by George Buchanan; Tom Fraser
Preceded by Tom Fraser; John James Robertson; Margaret Herbison	Joint Under-Secretary of State for Scotland; 1951–1955 with William McNair Snadden; James Henderson Stewart (1952–55)	Succeeded by Jack Nixon Browne; James Henderson Stewart; William McNair Snadden
Preceded by The Earl of Home	Minister of State for Scotland; 1955–1958	Succeeded by The Lord Forbes
Peerage of the United Kingdom
New creation	Baron Strathclyde; 2nd creation 1955–1985	Succeeded by Thomas Galbraith
