= Thomas Galbraith, 2nd Baron Strathclyde =

British politician (born 1960)

The Right Honourable The Lord Strathclyde CH PC
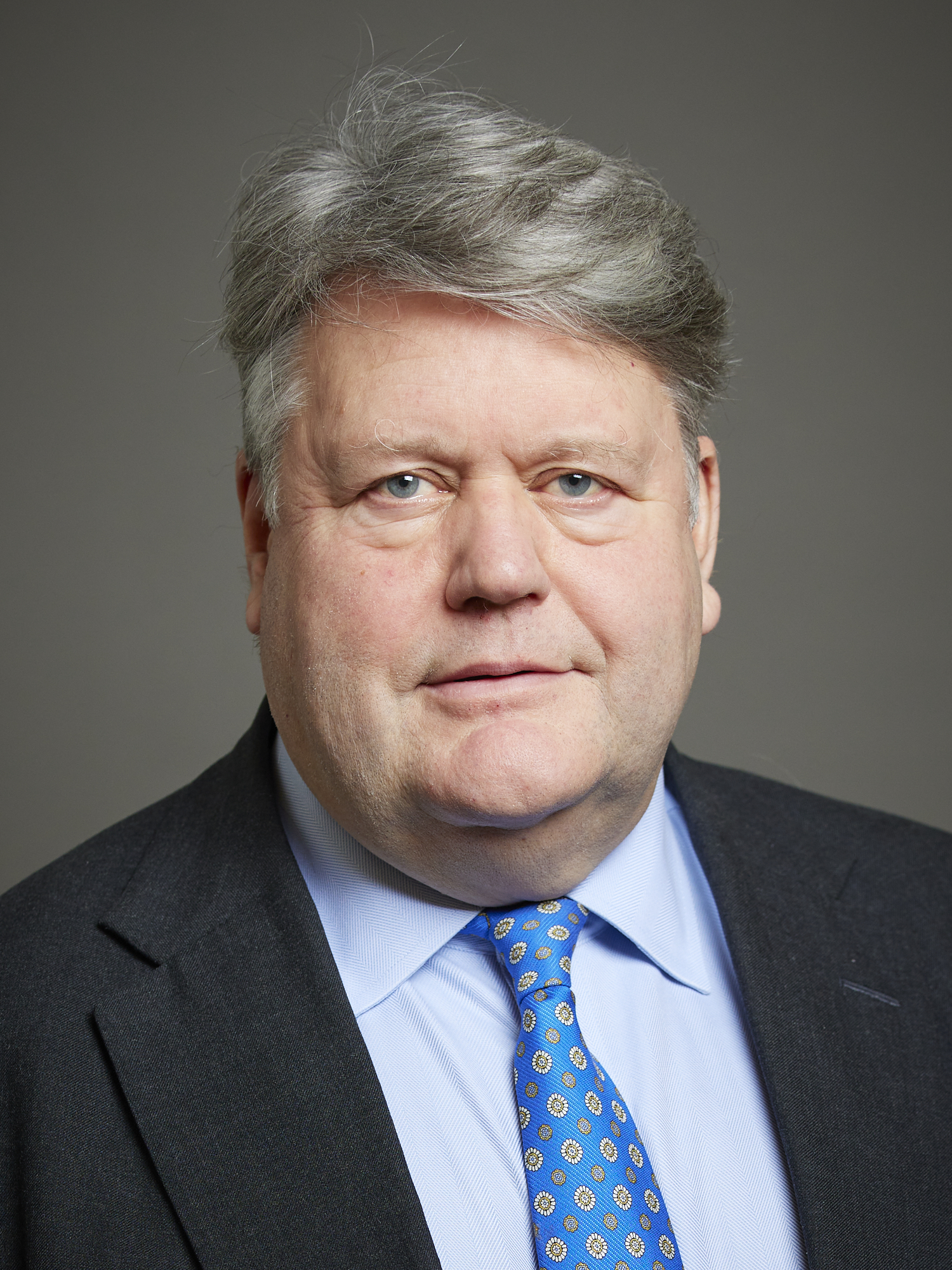
- Official portrait, 2023

Leader of the House of Lords Chancellor of the Duchy of Lancaster
- In office 12 May 2010 – 7 January 2013
- Prime Minister: David Cameron
- Preceded by: The Baroness Royall of Blaisdon
- Succeeded by: The Lord Hill of Oareford
Offices held 1993–2010
Leader of the Opposition in the Lords Shadow Leader of the House of Lords
In office 3 December 1998 – 11 May 2010
| Leader | William Hague; Iain Duncan Smith; Michael Howard; David Cameron |
| Preceded by | Viscount Cranborne |
| Succeeded by | The Baroness Royall of Blaisdon |
Opposition Chief Whip of the House of Lords
In office 2 May 1997 – 3 December 1998
| Leader | John Major; William Hague |
| Preceded by | The Lord Graham of Edmonton |
| Succeeded by | The Lord Henley |
Chief Whip of the House of Lords Captain of the Honourable Corps of Gentlemen-at-Arms
In office 20 July 1994 – 2 May 1997
| Prime Minister | John Major |
| Preceded by | The Viscount Ullswater |
| Succeeded by | The Lord Carter |
Minister of State for Trade and Industry
In office 16 September 1993 – 20 July 1994
| Prime Minister | John Major |
| Preceded by | The Baroness Denton of Wakefield |
| Succeeded by | The Lord Fraser of Carmyllie (1995) |
Parliamentary Under-Secretary of State 1988–1993
Parliamentary Under-Secretary of State for Environment
In office 15 April 1992 – 16 September 1993
| Prime Minister | John Major |
| Preceded by | Tim Yeo |
| Succeeded by | The Baroness Denton of Wakefield |
In office 26 July 1990 – 7 September 1990
| Prime Minister | Margaret Thatcher |
| Preceded by | Marion Roe |
| Succeeded by | The Baroness Blatch |
Parliamentary Under-Secretary of State for Scotland
In office 7 September 1990 – 14 April 1992
| Prime Minister | Margaret Thatcher; John Major |
| Preceded by | Michael Forsyth |
| Succeeded by | Allan Stewart |
Parliamentary Under-Secretary of State for Employment
In office 26 July 1989 – 24 July 1990
| Prime Minister | Margaret Thatcher |
| Preceded by | John Lee |
| Succeeded by | The Viscount Ullswater |

Lord-in-waiting Government Whip
- In office 12 August 1988 – 24 July 1989
- Prime Minister: Margaret Thatcher
- Preceded by: The Lord Beaverbrook
- Succeeded by: The Viscount Ullswater

Member of the House of Lords Lord Temporal
- Incumbent
- Life peerage 3 June 2026
- Elected Hereditary Peer; 11 November 1999 – 29 April 2026
- Election: 1999
- Preceded by: Seat established
- Succeeded by: Seat abolished
- Hereditary peerage 18 March 1986 – 11 November 1999
- Preceded by: The 1st Baron Strathclyde
- Succeeded by: Seat abolished

Personal details
- Born: Thomas Galloway Dunlop du Roy de Blicquy Galbraith; 22 February 1960 (age 66) Glasgow, Lanarkshire, Scotland
- Party: Conservative
- Spouse: Jane Skinner
- Children: 3
- Education: University of East Anglia

Thomas Galloway Dunlop du Roy de Blicquy Galbraith, 2nd Baron Strathclyde, Baron Strathclyde of Barskimming (born 22 February 1960), known informally as Tom Strathclyde, is a British Conservative politician. Lord Strathclyde served as Leader of the House of Lords and Chancellor of the Duchy of Lancaster under Prime Minister David Cameron from May 2010 until January 2013, having previously been Leader of the Opposition in the House of Lords (1998–2010). He was the last hereditary peer to serve as Leader of the Lords.

In May 2026, it was announced he was to be given one of 26 new life peerages, returning him to the House of Lords after the coming into force of the House of Lords (Hereditary Peers) Act 2026.

== Biography ==
Thomas Galbraith was born in Glasgow, the son of Conservative politician Sir Tam Galbraith and his Belgian wife Simone du Roy de Blicquy. His father was the MP for Glasgow Hillhead from 1948 until his death in 1982. Galbraith succeeded to the barony in 1985 at the age of 25, following the death of his grandfather Thomas Galbraith, 1st Baron Strathclyde. He contested the Merseyside East constituency in the 1984 European election.

== Education ==
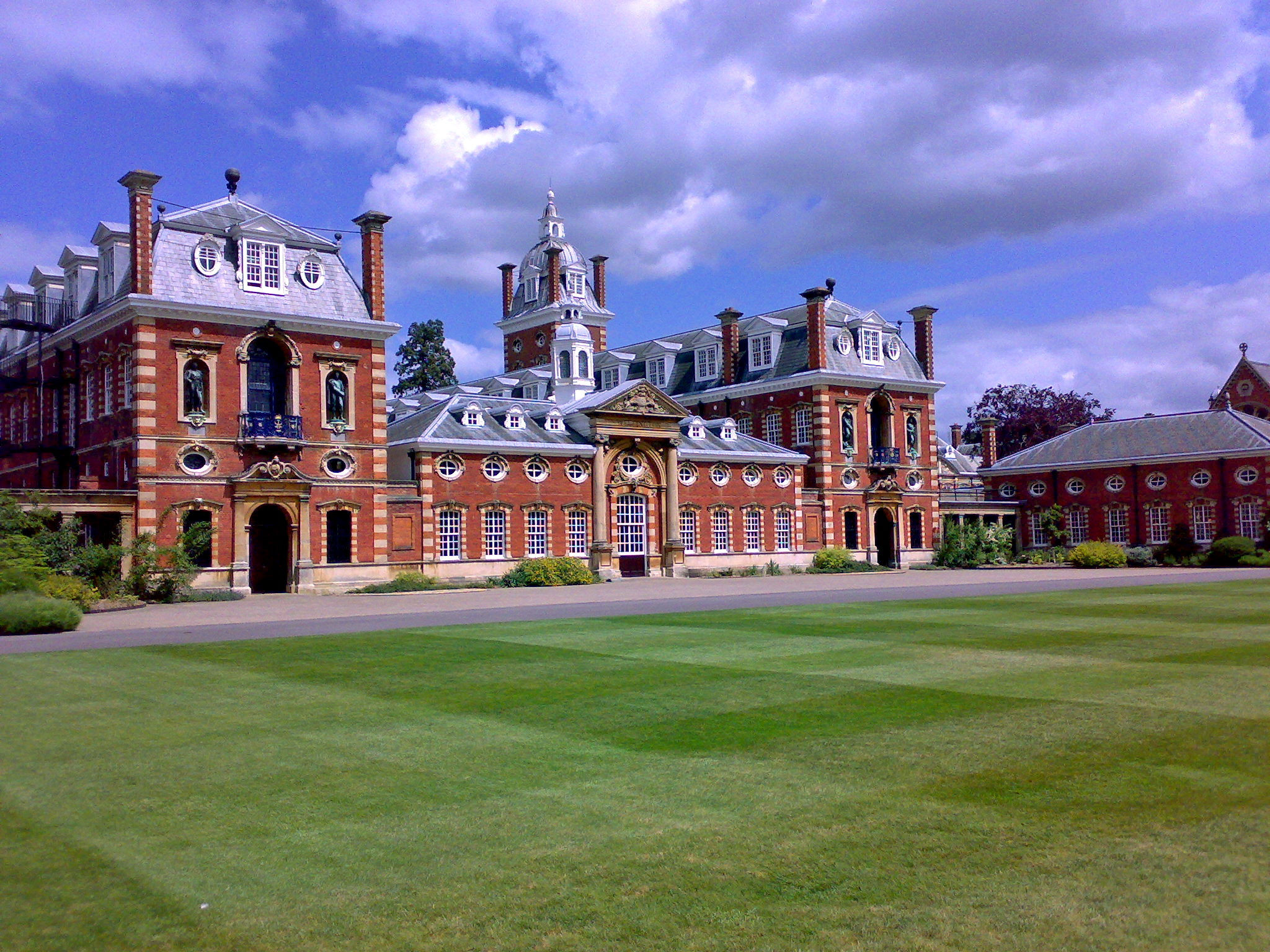
Wellington College, Berkshire

Galbraith was educated at Sussex House School, in London, and Wellington College near Sandhurst, Berkshire. He attended the University of East Anglia, where he graduated in 1982 with a Bachelor of Arts degree in modern languages and European studies. He also studied at Aix-Marseille University.

== House of Lords ==
Strathclyde entered the House of Lords in 1986, becoming a Junior Whip in 1988, then Minister for Tourism in 1989. Between 1990 and 1992, he was Minister for Agriculture and Fisheries in the Scottish Office. He then served in the Department of the Environment and the Department of Trade and Industry, before being appointed the Conservative Party Chief Whip in the House of Lords in 1994, succeeding Lord Ullswater. The next year, he was sworn of the Privy Council.

In 1998 Strathclyde, along with the Conservative front bench in the Lords, threatened to tender his resignation if the party refused to accept a proposed compromise plan for reform of the Lords that had been negotiated with the Labour Party by Lord Cranborne, the Conservatives' leader in the Lords, unbeknown to the Leader of the Opposition (in the Commons) William Hague, and to his annoyance. Hague, however, accepted the proposals, dismissing Cranborne for the conduct in negotiations, and Strathclyde was appointed to succeed him. Under his leadership, the House of Lords Act 1999 passed: under this, Strathclyde was elected by other peers as one of the 92 hereditary peers to remain in the House of Lords.

He won Channel 4 Peer of the Year 2000, and Spectator Peer of the Year 2004.

When the Conservatives formed a coalition government under David Cameron in May 2010, Strathclyde became Leader of the House of Lords and Chancellor of the Duchy of Lancaster, with a seat in the Cabinet.

On 7 January 2013, Strathclyde announced that he would be stepping down as Leader of the House of Lords, and resigning from the Cabinet with immediate effect, to pursue a second business career. He was succeeded by Lord Hill of Oareford. He was subsequently appointed a Member of the Order of the Companions of Honour for his services to the Lords.

On 26 April 2026, Lord Strathclyde lost his seat in the House of Lords because of the passage of the House of Lords (Hereditary Peers) Act 2026, which removed the remaining hereditary peers from the House of Lords. However, on 12 May 2026, it was announced that Strathclyde will be given a life peerage, which will enable his return to the house.

== Marriage and children ==
Strathclyde married Jane Skinner, elder daughter of John Skinner, in 1992. They have three daughters:

- The Hon. Elizabeth Ida Skinner Galbraith (born 1 December 1993)
- The Hon. Annabel Jane Simone Skinner Galbraith (born 15 May 1996)
- The Hon. Rose Marie Louise Skinner Galbraith (born 27 January 1999)

The family lives in Westminster and at the Galbraith family estate in Mauchline, Ayrshire.

As Strathclyde has no sons, the heir presumptive to the peerage is his younger brother, the Hon. Charles William du Roy de Blicquy Galbraith (born 1962).

== Outside interests ==
Lord Strathclyde is a governor of Wellington College, Berkshire. He received an Honorary Doctorate of Civil Law from the University of East Anglia in July 2018.

He is a director of Auchendrane Estates Ltd, a landowning company in Scotland. His wealth is estimated at £10m.

He was a non-executive director on the board of Trafigura's hedge-fund arm, Galena Asset Management, from 2004 until 2009. Trafigura defended court actions during the 2006 Ivory Coast toxic waste dump scandal and The Guardian suggested his appointment may be an attempt to de-toxify the Dutch company globally.

== Arms ==
Coat of arms of Thomas Galbraith, 2nd Baron Strathclyde
| Crest A Bear's Head erased Gules muzzled Argent Escutcheon Gules three Bears' Heads erased Argent muzzled Azure within a Bordure indented Or charged with three Mullets of the Third a Crescent of the Second for difference. Supporters Two Bears Gules muzzled Argent Motto Ab obice suavior ('Gentler because of the obstruction', alluding to the muzzled bear's head of the Clan Galbraith crest) |

Party political offices
| Preceded by The Viscount Ullswater | Conservative Chief Whip in the House of Lords; 1994–1998 | Succeeded by The Lord Henley |
| Preceded by Viscount Cranborne | Leader of the Conservative Party in the House of Lords; 1998–2013 | Succeeded by The Lord Hill of Oareford |
Political offices
| Preceded by The Viscount Ullswater | Chief Whip in the House of Lords; 1994–1997 | Succeeded by The Lord Carter |
| Preceded by The Viscount Ullswater | Captain of the Honourable Corps of Gentlemen-at-Arms; 1994–1997 | Succeeded by The Lord Carter |
| Preceded by The Lord Graham of Edmonton | Shadow Chief Whip of the House of Lords; 1997–1998 | Succeeded by The Lord Henley |
| Preceded by Viscount Cranborne | Leader of the Opposition in the House of Lords; 1998–2010 | Succeeded by The Baroness Royall of Blaisdon |
| Preceded by The Baroness Royall of Blaisdon | Leader of the House of Lords; 2010–2013 | Succeeded by The Lord Hill of Oareford |
| Preceded by The Baroness Royall of Blaisdon | Chancellor of the Duchy of Lancaster; 2010–2013 | Succeeded by The Lord Hill of Oareford |
Parliament of the United Kingdom
| New office created by the House of Lords Act 1999 | Elected hereditary peer to the House of Lords under the House of Lords Act 1999; 1999–2026 | Position abolished under the House of Lords (Hereditary Peers) Act 2026 |
Peerage of the United Kingdom
| Preceded by Thomas Galbraith | Baron Strathclyde; 1985–present Member of the House of Lords (1985–1999) | Incumbent; Heir presumptive: Hon. Charles Galbraith |
