= 1967 Glasgow Pollok by-election =

UK parliamentary by-election

- 9 March 1967

Glasgow Pollok constituency
| | First party | Second party | Third party |
|---|---|---|---|
| Candidate | Esmond Wright | Dick Douglas | George Leslie |
| Party | Conservative | Labour | SNP |
| Popular vote | 14,270 | 12,069 | 10,884 |
| Percentage | 36.9% | 31.2% | 28.2% |
| Swing | ▼10.6% | ▼21.2% | New |
- Map showing the Glasgow Pollok Parliamentary constituency within Scotland.
MP before election
Alex Garrow
Labour
Subsequent MP
Esmond Wright
Conservative

The 1967 Glasgow Pollok by-election of 9 March 1967 was held after the death of Labour Party Member of Parliament (MP) Alex Garrow.

The seat was marginal, having been won by Labour at the 1966 United Kingdom general election by under 2,000 votes. Until the 1964 general election, the seat had been represented by Unionist MPs (the equivalent of Conservatives) continuously since its creation in 1918.

This was the Conservatives' last gain at a Scottish by-election until the 2026 Aberdeen South by-election.

== Candidates ==
- Conservative Party candidate Esmond Wright was a historian and author
- The Labour Party nominated local councillor and campaigner Dick Douglas as their candidate
- George Leslie, who had trained as a vet after studying at Glasgow University, stood for the Scottish National Party (SNP)
- The local Liberal Party association nominated Ian Miller
- The Communist Party of Great Britain chose Alex Murray, their Scottish Secretary, to be their candidate

== Result of the previous general election ==
General election 1966: Glasgow Pollok
| Party | Candidate | Votes | % | ±% |
|---|---|---|---|---|
| Labour | Alex Garrow | 21,257 | 52.44 | |
| Conservative | P T Smollett | 19,282 | 47.56 | |
| Majority | | 1,975 | 4.88 | |
| Turnout | | 40,539 | | |
| Labour hold | | Swing | | |

== Result of the by-election ==
Glasgow Pollok by-election, 9 March 1967
| Party | Candidate | Votes | % | ±% |
|---|---|---|---|---|
| Conservative | Esmond Wright | 14,270 | 36.92 | ▼10.64 |
| Labour | Dick Douglas | 12,069 | 31.22 | ▼21.22 |
| SNP | George Leslie | 10,884 | 28.16 | New |
| Liberal | Ian Miller | 735 | 1.90 | New |
| Communist | Alexander Murray | 694 | 1.80 | New |
| Majority | | 2,201 | 5.70 | N/A |
| Turnout | | 38,652 | | |
| Conservative gain from Labour | | Swing | | |

Both main parties lost votes compared with the previous general election due to the good showing of the SNP, who recorded what was then their best result in a Glasgow constituency. However, as the Conservatives had predicted, the SNP drew more votes from Labour, allowing Wright to gain the seat with a majority of 2,201. It was the first time the Conservatives had gained a seat in Scotland since the 1959 general election and the party's first by-election gain since the Glasgow Camlachie by-election in 1948. The Glasgow Herald suggested that the result would be claimed as a turning point by the Conservatives in Scotland, while Labour would have to eat "a lot of campaign words", having predicted that they would have an increased majority and that the SNP would lose their deposit. Having almost pushed Labour into third place the result was described by the same newspaper as a "triumph" for the SNP, who had not previously contested the constituency, while the poor showing by the Liberals was labelled "a disaster".
