= Baron Strathclyde =

Extant barony in the Peerage of the United Kingdom

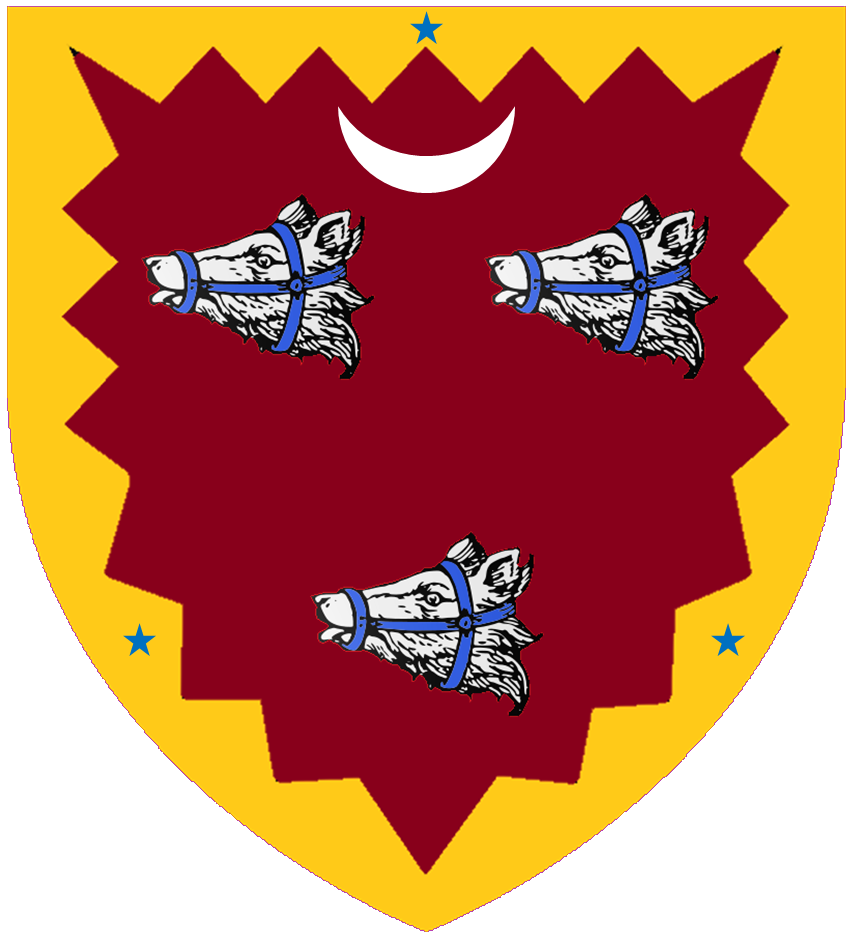
- Gules, three bear's heads erased argent, muzzled azure, within a bordure indented or, charged with three mullets of the third, a crescent of the second for difference
- Creation date: 4 May 1955
- Created by: Queen Elizabeth II
- Peerage: Peerage of the United Kingdom
- First holder: Thomas Galbraith
- Present holder: Thomas Galbraith, 2nd Baron Strathclyde
- Heir presumptive: Hon. Charles Galbraith
- Remainder to: Heirs male of the first baron's body
- Former seat: Barskimming House
- Motto: Ab obice suavior ("Stronger when opposed")

Alexander Ure

Baron Strathclyde is a title that has been created twice in British history, both times in the Peerage of the United Kingdom. It was first created on 15 January 1914 when the politician and judge Alexander Ure was made Baron Strathclyde, of Sandyford in Lanarkshire. This creation became extinct on his death in 1928.

It was created for a second time on 4 May 1955 when the Scottish Unionist Party politician Thomas Dunlop Galbraith was made Baron Strathclyde, of Barskimming in the County of Ayr. Since 1985, the title has been held by his grandson, the second Baron. He is the son of the politician the Hon. Sir Tam Galbraith KBE, eldest son of the first Baron. Lord Strathclyde is one of the ninety elected hereditary peers that remain in the House of Lords after the passing of the House of Lords Act 1999.

== Baron Strathclyde, first creation (1914) ==
- Alexander Ure, 1st Baron Strathclyde (1853–1928)

== Baron Strathclyde, second creation (1955) ==
- Thomas Dunlop Galbraith, 1st Baron Strathclyde (1891–1985)
  - Thomas Galloway Dunlop "Tam" Galbraith (1917–1982)
- Thomas Galloway Dunlop du Roy de Blicquy Galbraith, 2nd Baron Strathclyde (born 1960)

The second baron has three daughters. The heir presumptive is the present holder's brother, the Hon. Charles William du Roy de Blicquy Galbraith (born 1962), also grandson of the first baron. The heir presumptive's heir apparent is his son, Humphrey Eldred Galloway Galbraith (born 1994).

== Line of succession ==
- Thomas Dunlop Galbraith, 1st Baron Strathclyde (1891–1985)
  - Hon. Sir Thomas Galloway Dunlop Galbraith (1917–1982)
    - Thomas Galloway Dunlop du Roy de Blicquy Galbraith, 2nd Baron Strathclyde, CH (b. 1960) Elected to remain in 1999.
    - (1) Hon. Charles William du Roy de Blicquy Galbraith (b. 1962)
      - (2) Humphrey Eldred Galloway Galbraith (b. 1994)
      - (3) Alexander Charles Geoffrey Galbraith (b. 1997)
      - (4) Tobias Petrus Galbraith (b. 2002)
  - Hon. James Muir Galloway Galbraith (1920–2003)
    - (5) Brodie Thomas Paget Galbraith (b. 1948)
      - (6) Alexander Galbraith (b. 1988)
    - (7) James Muir Paget Galbraith (b. 1955)
    - (8) John Kenneth Paget Galbraith (b. 1956)
      - (9) Donald Galbraith (b. 1983)
      - (10) Jock Galbraith (b. 1993)
  - Hon. Norman Dunlop Galloway Galbraith (1925–2013)
    - (11) Norman Thomas Galloway Galbraith (b. 1955)
      - (12) Jake Geoffrey Kent Galbraith (b. 1989)
      - (13) James Jan Kent Galbraith (b. 1991)
      - (14) Thomas Norman Kent Galbraith (b. 1996)
  - Hon. David Muir Galloway Galbraith (1928–2006)
    - (15) William James Kennedy Galbraith (b. 1970)
      - (16) Archie Edward David Galbraith (b. 2002)
