= 1974 United States Senate elections =

- November 5, 1974
- Class 3

34 of the 100 seats in the United States Senate 51 seats needed for a majority
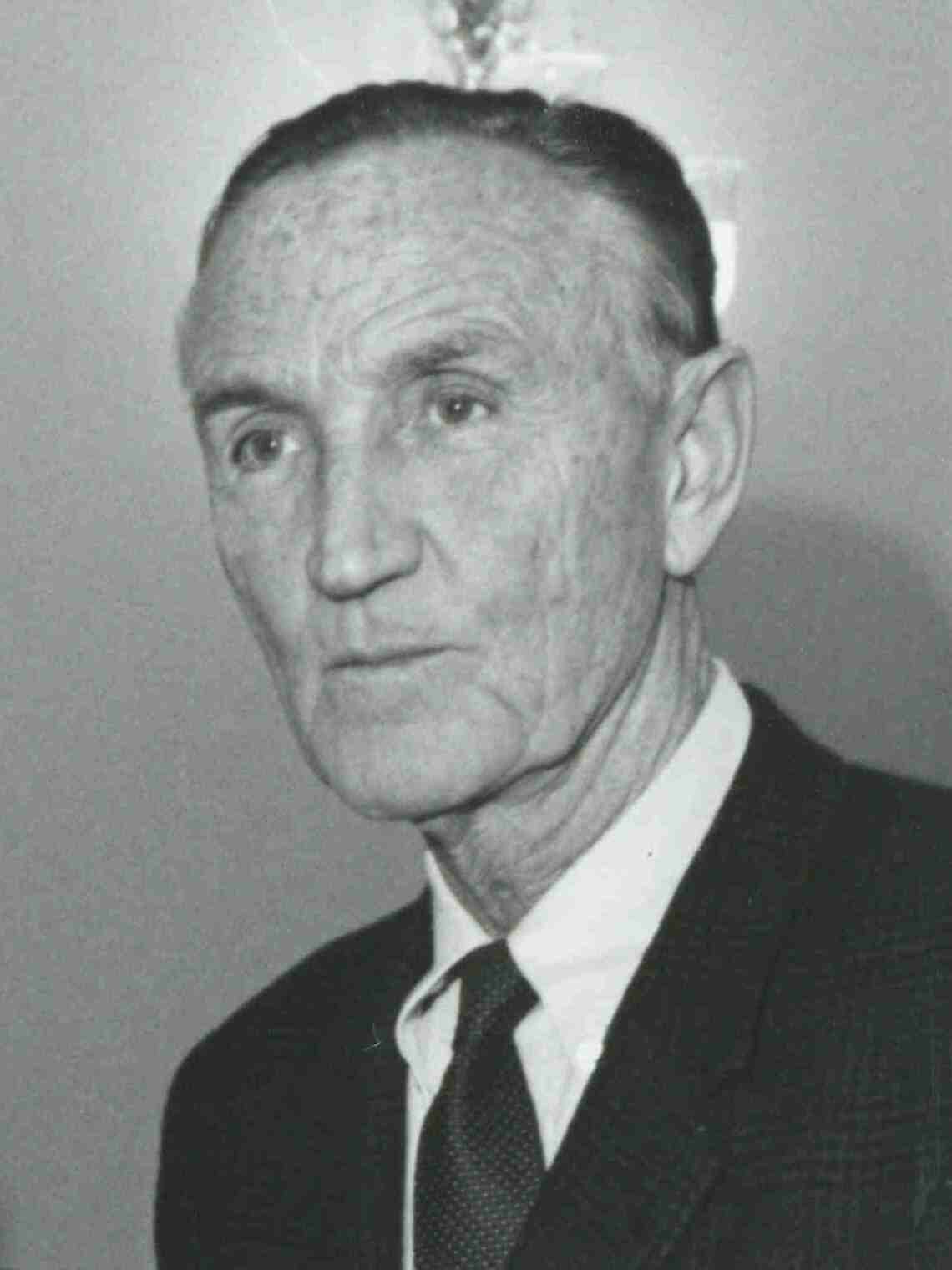

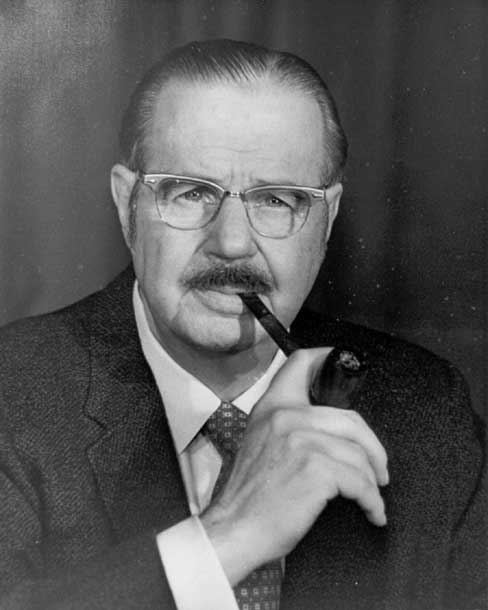
	Majority party	Minority party
Leader	Mike Mansfield	Hugh Scott
Party	Democratic	Republican
Leader since	January 3, 1961	September 24, 1969
Leader's seat	Montana	Pennsylvania
Seats before	57	41
Seats after	61 (Note: Includes New Hampshire, where the result of the November election was voided; in the ensuing Special Election of September 1975, where the same two major party candidates as that of the November election stood, a Democratic pickup occurred. The Clerk of the House of Representatives considers the immediate results of these elections to have resulted in a 61–37–2 majority, which would include this pickup in New Hampshire.)	37
Seat change	▲4	▼4
Popular vote	22,544,761	16,145,793 (Note: The Liberal Party in New York endorsed Jacob Javits, but the Clerk of the U.S. House of Representatives did not tabulate their votes, totaling 241,659, into the national Republican total.)
Percentage	55.2%	39.6%
Seats up	20	14
Races won	24	10
	Third party	Fourth party
Party	Independent	Conservative
Seats before	1	1
Seats after	1 (Note: Harry F. Byrd, Jr. (VA), was an independent who caucused with the Democrats. In some circles, he is called an "Independent Democrat", but his actual registration was listed as "Independent". See, e. g., United States Congress. "Harry Flood Byrd, Jr. (id: B001209)". Biographical Directory of the United States Congress.)	1
Seat change	Steady	Steady
Popular vote	199,108	822,584
Percentage	0.5%	2.0%
Seats up	0	0
Races won	0	0
- Results of the elections: Democratic gain Republican gain Democratic hold Republican hold No election
Majority Leader before election
Mike Mansfield
Democratic
Elected Majority Leader
Mike Mansfield
Democratic

The 1974 United States Senate elections were held on November 5, with the 34 seats of Class 3 contested in regular elections. They occurred in the wake of the Watergate scandal, President Richard Nixon's resignation from the presidency, and Gerald Ford's subsequent pardon of Nixon. Economic issues, specifically inflation and stagnation, were also a factor that contributed to Republican losses. As an immediate result of the November 1974 elections, Democrats made a net gain of three seats from the Republicans, as they defeated Republican incumbents in Colorado and Kentucky and picked up open seats in Florida and Vermont, while Republicans won the open seat in Nevada. Following the elections, at the beginning of the 94th U.S. Congress, the Democratic caucus controlled 60 seats (as well as one independent), and the Republican caucus controlled 38 seats (as well as one Conservative).

Democrats gained an additional seat, bringing the net pick-up to four seats, in 1975, when Democrat John A. Durkin won a disputed election in New Hampshire that was unintentionally held after the 1974 election resulted in two recounts and an extended dispute in the Senate. Durkin's Senate term began in September 1975, following his victory in that election. As of 2023, this is the most recent election in which a Democrat has been elected Senator from Idaho. This was the first election the Republicans had not won a seat in New England since the establishment of the party.

Several other Republican incumbents won very close races; Milton Young of North Dakota won reelection against Democrat William L. Guy by only 186 votes and Henry Bellmon of Oklahoma won reelection against Democrat Ed Edmondson by half a percent of the vote. Bob Dole of Kansas survived the closest election of his career against Democratic Rep. William Roy, a race undoubtedly made close due to Dole's close association with Nixon as chairman of the Republican National Committee. Prior to 2026, it was the closest the Democrats had come to winning a Senate election in Kansas since George McGill won re-election in 1932.

== Results summary ==
↓
61	1	1	37
Democratic	I	C	Republican

Parties						Total
Parties	Democratic	Republican	Conservative	Independent	Other	Total
Last elections (1972)	56	42	1	1	0	100
Before these elections	57	41	1	1	0	100
Not up	41	23	1	1	—	66
Up Class 3 (1968→1974)	20	14	0	0	—	34
Incumbent retired	3	4	—	—	—	7
Held by same party	2	1	—	—	—	3
Replaced by other party	▼3 Republicans replaced by ▲3 Democrats ▼1 Democrat replaced by ▲1 Republican		—	—	—	4
Result	5	2	0	0	0	7
Incumbent ran	17 (Note: The two senators, J. William Fulbright of Arkansas and Howard Metzenbaum of Ohio, both lost renomination and nomination to the full term, respectively, Dale Bumpers and John Glenn became the party's new nominees in each state.)	10	—	—	—	27
Won re-election	15	8	—	—	—	23
Lost re-election	▼2 Republicans replaced by ▲2 Democrats		—	—	—	2
Lost renomination, but held by same party	2	0	—	—	—	2
Result	19	8	0	0	0	27
Total elected	24	10	0	0	0	34
Net gain/loss	▲4	▼4	Steady	Steady	Steady	4
Nationwide vote	22,544,761	16,145,793	822,584	199,108	1,098,146	40,810,392
Share	55.24%	39.56%	2.02%	0.49%	2.69%	100%
Result	61	37	1	1	0	100

Source: Office of the Clerk of the United States House of Representatives

== Gains, losses, and holds ==
=== Retirements ===
Four Republicans and three Democrats retired instead of seeking re-election.

State	Senator	Replaced by
Florida	Edward Gurney	Richard Stone
Iowa	Harold Hughes	John Culver
Nevada	Alan Bible	Paul Laxalt
New Hampshire (later voided)	Norris Cotton	Louis C. Wyman
North Carolina	Sam Ervin	Robert Burren Morgan
Utah	Wallace F. Bennett	Jake Garn
Vermont	George Aiken	Patrick Leahy

=== Defeats ===
Two Republicans and two Democrats sought re-election but lost in the primary or general election.

State	Senator	Replaced by
Arkansas	J. William Fulbright	Dale Bumpers
Colorado	Peter H. Dominick	Gary Hart
Kentucky	Marlow Cook	Wendell Ford
Ohio	Howard Metzenbaum	John Glenn

=== Post-election changes ===
One Republican appointee did not seek to finish the term following the contested election and one Democrat was elected on September 16, 1975.

State	Senator	Replaced by
New Hampshire (Class 3)	Norris Cotton	John A. Durkin

== Change in composition ==
=== Before the elections ===
After the January 4, 1974 appointment in Ohio.

D_{1}	D_{2}	D_{3}	D_{4}	D_{5}	D_{6}	D_{7}	D_{8}	D_{9}	D_{10}
D_{20}	D_{19}	D_{18}	D_{17}	D_{16}	D_{15}	D_{14}	D_{13}	D_{12}	D_{11}
D_{21}	D_{22}	D_{23}	D_{24}	D_{25}	D_{26}	D_{27}	D_{28}	D_{29}	D_{30}
D_{40} Ark. Ran	D_{39} Alaska; Ran	D_{38} Ala. Ran	D_{37}	D_{36}	D_{35}	D_{34}	D_{33}	D_{32}	D_{31}
D_{41} Calif. Ran	D_{42} Conn. Ran	D_{43} Ga. Ran	D_{44} Hawaii; Ran	D_{45} Idaho; Ran	D_{46} Ill. Ran	D_{47} Ind. Ran	D_{48} Iowa; Retired	D_{49} La. Ran	D_{50} Mo. Ran
Majority →									D_{51} Nev. Retired
R_{41} Vt. Retired	C_{1}	I_{1}	D_{57} Wisc. Ran	D_{56} Wash. Ran	D_{55} S.D. Ran	D_{54} S.C. Ran	D_{53} Ohio; Ran	D_{52} N.C. Retired	D_{51} Nev. Retired
R_{40} Utah; Retired	R_{39} Pa. Ran	R_{38} Ore. Ran	R_{37} Okla. Ran	R_{36} N.D. Ran	R_{35} N.Y. Ran	R_{34} N.H. Retired	R_{33} Md. Ran	R_{32} Ky. Ran	R_{31} Kan. Ran
R_{21}	R_{22}	R_{23}	R_{24}	R_{25}	R_{26}	R_{27}	R_{28} Ariz. Ran	R_{29} Colo. Ran	R_{30} Fla. Ran
R_{20}	R_{19}	R_{18}	R_{17}	R_{16}	R_{15}	R_{14}	R_{13}	R_{12}	R_{11}
R_{1}	R_{2}	R_{3}	R_{4}	R_{5}	R_{6}	R_{7}	R_{8}	R_{9}	R_{10}

=== After the general elections ===
D_{1}	D_{2}	D_{3}	D_{4}	D_{5}	D_{6}	D_{7}	D_{8}	D_{9}	D_{10}
D_{20}	D_{19}	D_{18}	D_{17}	D_{16}	D_{15}	D_{14}	D_{13}	D_{12}	D_{11}
D_{21}	D_{22}	D_{23}	D_{24}	D_{25}	D_{26}	D_{27}	D_{28}	D_{29}	D_{30}
D_{40} Ark. Hold	D_{39} Alaska; Re-elected	D_{38} Ala. Re-elected	D_{37}	D_{36}	D_{35}	D_{34}	D_{33}	D_{32}	D_{31}
D_{41} Calif. Re-elected	D_{42} Conn. Re-elected	D_{43} Ga. Re-elected	D_{44} Hawaii; Re-elected	D_{45} Idaho; Re-elected	D_{46} Ill. Re-elected	D_{47} Ind. Re-elected	D_{48} Iowa; Hold	D_{49} La. Re-elected	D_{50} Mo. Re-elected
Majority →									D_{51} N.C. Hold
D_{60} Vt. Gain	D_{59} Ky. Gain	D_{58} Fla. Gain	D_{57} Colo. Gain	D_{56} Wash. Re-elected	D_{55} S.D. Re-elected	D_{54} S.C. Re-elected	D_{53} Ohio; Hold	D_{52} N.D. Re-elected	D_{51} N.C. Hold
I_{1}	Vacant; N.H. Annulled	C_{1}	R_{37} Nev. Gain	R_{36} Wisc. Re-elected	R_{35} Utah; Hold	R_{34} Pa. Re-elected	R_{33} Ore. Re-elected	R_{32} Okla. Re-elected	R_{31} N.Y. Re-elected
R_{21}	R_{22}	R_{23}	R_{24}	R_{25}	R_{26}	R_{27}	R_{28} Ariz. Re-elected	R_{29} Kan. Re-elected	R_{30} Md. Re-elected
R_{20}	R_{19}	R_{18}	R_{17}	R_{16}	R_{15}	R_{14}	R_{13}	R_{12}	R_{11}
R_{1}	R_{2}	R_{3}	R_{4}	R_{5}	R_{6}	R_{7}	R_{8}	R_{9}	R_{10}

=== Beginning of the next Congress ===
D_{1}	D_{2}	D_{3}	D_{4}	D_{5}	D_{6}	D_{7}	D_{8}	D_{9}	D_{10}
D_{20}	D_{19}	D_{18}	D_{17}	D_{16}	D_{15}	D_{14}	D_{13}	D_{12}	D_{11}
D_{21}	D_{22}	D_{23}	D_{24}	D_{25}	D_{26}	D_{27}	D_{28}	D_{29}	D_{30}
D_{40}	D_{39}	D_{38}	D_{37}	D_{36}	D_{35}	D_{34}	D_{33}	D_{32}	D_{31}
D_{41}	D_{42}	D_{43}	D_{44}	D_{45}	D_{46}	D_{47}	D_{48}	D_{49}	D_{50}
Majority →									D_{51}
D_{60}	D_{59}	D_{58}	D_{57}	D_{56}	D_{55}	D_{54}	D_{53}	D_{52}	D_{51}
D_{61} N.H. Gain	I_{1}	C_{1}	R_{37}	R_{36}	R_{35}	R_{34}	R_{33}	R_{32}	R_{31}
R_{21}	R_{22}	R_{23}	R_{24}	R_{25}	R_{26}	R_{27}	R_{28}	R_{29}	R_{30}
R_{20}	R_{19}	R_{18}	R_{17}	R_{16}	R_{15}	R_{14}	R_{13}	R_{12}	R_{11}
R_{1}	R_{2}	R_{3}	R_{4}	R_{5}	R_{6}	R_{7}	R_{8}	R_{9}	R_{10}

Key

C_{#}	Conservative
D_{#}	Democratic
R_{#}	Republican
I_{#}	Independent

== Race summary ==
=== Elections leading to the next Congress ===
In these general elections, the winners were elected for the term beginning January 3, 1975; ordered by state.

All of the elections involved the Class 3 seats.

State (linked to summaries below)	Incumbent			Result	Candidates
State (linked to summaries below)	Senator	Party	Electoral history	Result	Candidates
Alabama	James Allen	Democratic	1968	Incumbent re-elected.	▌ ✓ James Allen (Democratic) 95.8%; ▌Alvin Abercrombie (Prohibition) 4.2%
Alaska	Mike Gravel	Democratic	1968	Incumbent re-elected.	▌ ✓ Mike Gravel (Democratic) 58.3%; ▌C. R. Lewis (Republican) 41.7%
Arizona	Barry Goldwater	Republican	1952; 1958; 1964 (retired); 1968	Incumbent re-elected.	▌ ✓ Barry Goldwater (Republican) 58.3%; ▌Jonathan Marshall (Democratic) 41.7%
Arkansas	J. William Fulbright	Democratic	1944; 1950; 1956; 1962; 1968	Incumbent lost renomination. Democratic hold.	▌ ✓ Dale Bumpers (Democratic) 84.9%; ▌John H. Jones (Republican) 15.1%
California	Alan Cranston	Democratic	1968	Incumbent re-elected.	▌ ✓ Alan Cranston (Democratic) 60.5%; ▌H. L. Richardson (Republican) 36.2%; Others: ▌Jack McCoy (American Independent) 1.7%; ▌Gayle M. Justice (Peace and Freedom) 1.6%
Colorado	Peter H. Dominick	Republican	1968	Incumbent lost re-election. Democratic gain.	▌ ✓ Gary Hart (Democratic) 57.2%; ▌Peter H. Dominick (Republican) 39.5%; Others: ▌John McCandish King (Independent) 2.0%; ▌Joseph Fred Hyskell (Prohibition) 1.0%; ▌Henry John Olshaw (American) 0.3%
Connecticut	Abraham Ribicoff	Democratic	1962; 1968	Incumbent re-elected.	▌ ✓ Abraham Ribicoff (Democratic) 63.7%; ▌James H. Brannen III (Republican) 34.3%
Florida	Edward Gurney	Republican	1968	Incumbent retired. Democratic gain. Incumbent resigned December 31, 1974 to give successor preferential seniority. Winner appointed January 1, 1975.	▌ ✓ Richard Stone (Democratic) 43.4%; ▌Jack Eckerd (Republican) 40.9%; ▌John Grady (American) 15.7%
Georgia	Herman Talmadge	Democratic	1956; 1962; 1968	Incumbent re-elected.	▌ ✓ Herman Talmadge (Democratic) 71.7%; ▌Jerry Johnson (Republican) 28.2%
Hawaii	Daniel Inouye	Democratic	1962; 1968	Incumbent re-elected.	▌ ✓ Daniel Inouye (Democratic) 82.9%; ▌James D. Kimmel (Independent) 17.1%
Idaho	Frank Church	Democratic	1956; 1962; 1968	Incumbent re-elected.	▌ ✓ Frank Church (Democratic) 56.1%; ▌Robert L. Smith (Republican) 42.1%; ▌Jean Stoddard (American) 1.8%
Illinois	Adlai Stevenson III	Democratic	1970 (special)	Incumbent re-elected.	▌ ✓ Adlai Stevenson III (Democratic) 62.2%; ▌George Burditt (Republican) 37.2%
Indiana	Birch Bayh	Democratic	1962; 1968	Incumbent re-elected.	▌ ✓ Birch Bayh (Democratic) 50.7%; ▌Richard Lugar (Republican) 46.4%; ▌Don L. Lee (American) 2.8%
Iowa	Harold Hughes	Democratic	1968	Incumbent retired. Democratic hold.	▌ ✓ John Culver (Democratic) 52.0%; ▌David M. Stanley (Republican) 47.3%
Kansas	Bob Dole	Republican	1968	Incumbent re-elected.	▌ ✓ Bob Dole (Republican) 50.9%; ▌William R. Roy (Democratic) 49.1%
Kentucky	Marlow Cook	Republican	1968	Incumbent lost re-election. Democratic gain. Incumbent resigned December 27, 1974 to give successor preferential seniority. Winner appointed December 28, 1974.	▌ ✓ Wendell Ford (Democratic) 53.5%; ▌Marlow Cook (Republican) 44.1%; ▌William E. Parker (American) 2.4%
Louisiana	Russell B. Long	Democratic	1948 (special); 1950; 1956; 1962; 1968	Incumbent re-elected.	▌ ✓ Russell B. Long (Democratic); Unopposed
Maryland	Charles Mathias	Republican	1968	Incumbent re-elected.	▌ ✓ Charles Mathias (Republican) 57.3%; ▌Barbara Mikulski (Democratic) 42.7%
Missouri	Thomas Eagleton	Democratic	1968	Incumbent re-elected.	▌ ✓ Thomas Eagleton (Democratic) 60.1%; ▌Thomas B. Curtis (Republican) 39.3%; ▌Cliff Talmage (Independent) 0.6%
Nevada	Alan Bible	Democratic	1954 (special); 1956; 1962; 1968	Incumbent retired. Republican gain. Incumbent resigned December 17, 1974 to give successor preferential seniority. Winner appointed December 18, 1974.	▌ ✓ Paul Laxalt (Republican) 47.0%; ▌Harry Reid (Democratic) 46.6%
New Hampshire	Norris Cotton	Republican	1954 (special); 1956; 1962; 1968	Incumbent retired. Republican hold. Incumbent resigned December 31, 1974 and successor was appointed the same day. Election was later contested and voided.	▌ ✓ Louis C. Wyman (Republican) 49.7%; ▌John A. Durkin (Democratic) 49.7%
New York	Jacob Javits	Republican	1956; 1962; 1968	Incumbent re-elected.	▌ ✓ Jacob Javits (Republican) 45.3%; ▌Ramsey Clark (Democratic) 38.2%; ▌Barbara A. Keating (Conservative) 15.9%; Others: ▌Rebecca Finch (Socialist Workers) 0.1%; ▌William F. Dowling Jr. (Courage) 0.1%; ▌Robert E. Massi (Socialist Labor) 0.1%; ▌Mildred Edelman (Communist) 0.1%; ▌Elijah Boyd Jr. (Labor) 0.1%
North Carolina	Sam Ervin	Democratic	1954 (special); 1954 (appointed); 1956; 1962; 1968	Incumbent retired. Democratic hold.	▌ ✓ Robert Burren Morgan (Democratic) 62.1%; ▌William E. Stevens (Republican) 37.0%
North Dakota	Milton Young	Republican	1945 (appointed); 1946 (special); 1950; 1956; 1962; 1968	Incumbent re-elected.	▌ ✓ Milton Young (Republican) 48.4%; ▌William L. Guy (Democratic-NPL) 48.3%
Ohio	Howard Metzenbaum	Democratic	1974 (appointed)	Interim appointee lost nomination. Democratic hold. Incumbent resigned December 23, 1974 to give successor preferential seniority. Winner appointed December 24, 1974.	▌ ✓ John Glenn (Democratic) 64.6%; ▌Ralph Perk (Republican) 30.7%
Oklahoma	Henry Bellmon	Republican	1968	Incumbent re-elected.	▌ ✓ Henry Bellmon (Republican) 49.4%; ▌Ed Edmondson (Democratic) 48.9%
Oregon	Bob Packwood	Republican	1968	Incumbent re-elected.	▌ ✓ Bob Packwood (Republican) 54.9%; ▌Betty Roberts (Democratic) 44.2%
Pennsylvania	Richard Schweiker	Republican	1968	Incumbent re-elected.	▌ ✓ Richard Schweiker (Republican) 53.0%; ▌Peter F. Flaherty (Democratic) 45.9%; ▌George W. Shankey (Constitution) 1.1%
South Carolina	Fritz Hollings	Democratic	1966 (special); 1968	Incumbent re-elected.	▌ ✓ Fritz Hollings (Democratic) 69.5%; ▌Gwenyfred Bush (Republican) 28.6%
South Dakota	George McGovern	Democratic	1962; 1968	Incumbent re-elected.	▌ ✓ George McGovern (Democratic) 53.0%; ▌Leo K. Thorsness (Republican) 47.0%
Utah	Wallace F. Bennett	Republican	1950; 1956; 1962; 1968	Incumbent retired. Republican hold. Incumbent resigned December 20, 1974 to give successor preferential seniority. Winner appointed December 21, 1974.	▌ ✓ Jake Garn (Republican) 50.0%; ▌Wayne Owens (Democratic) 44.1%
Vermont	George Aiken	Republican	1940 (special); 1944; 1950; 1956; 1962; 1968	Incumbent retired. Democratic gain.	▌ ✓ Patrick Leahy (Democratic) 49.5%; ▌Richard W. Mallary (Republican) 46.4%
Washington	Warren Magnuson	Democratic	1944; 1944 (appointed); 1950; 1956; 1962; 1968	Incumbent re-elected.	▌ ✓ Warren Magnuson (Democratic) 60.7%; ▌Jack Metcalf (Republican) 36.1%; Others: ▌Gene Goosman (American Independent) 2.0%; ▌Clare Fraenzl (Socialist Workers) 0.8%; ▌Pat Ruckert (U.S. Labor) 0.4%
Wisconsin	Gaylord Nelson	Democratic	1962; 1968	Incumbent re-elected.	▌ ✓ Gaylord Nelson (Democratic) 61.8%; ▌Tom Petri (Republican) 35.8%

== Closest races ==
In fourteen races the margin of victory was under 10%.

State	Party of winner	Margin
New Hampshire	Republican (later overturned)	0.0009%
North Dakota	Republican	0.07%
Nevada	Republican (flip)	0.37%
Oklahoma	Republican	0.48%
Kansas	Republican	1.70%
Vermont	Democratic (flip)	3.09%
Florida	Democratic (flip)	3.32%
Indiana	Democratic	4.29%
Iowa	Democratic	4.76%
Utah	Republican	5.92%
South Dakota	Democratic	6.08%
New York	Republican	7.09%
Pennsylvania	Republican	7.11%
Kentucky	Democratic (flip)	9.48%

Illinois was the tipping point state with a margin of 25%.

== Alabama ==
1974 Democratic Senate primary election in Alabama
- August 6, 1974
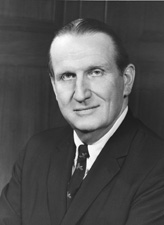

Nominee	James B. Allen	John Taylor
Party	Democratic	Democratic
Popular vote	572,584	118,848
Percentage	82.81%	17.19%
- County results Allen: 60–70% 70–80% 80–90% >90%

Democratic United States senator James Allen won re-election to a second term, faced no Republican opponent in the general election, defeating Prohibition Party nominee Alvin Abercrombie.

1974 United States Senate election in Alabama Results
Party	Candidate	Votes	%
Democratic	James Allen (Incumbent)	501,541	95.84
Prohibition	Alvin Abercrombie	21,749	4.16
Majority		479,792	91.68
Turnout		523,290	
Democratic hold			

== Alaska ==
Alaska election
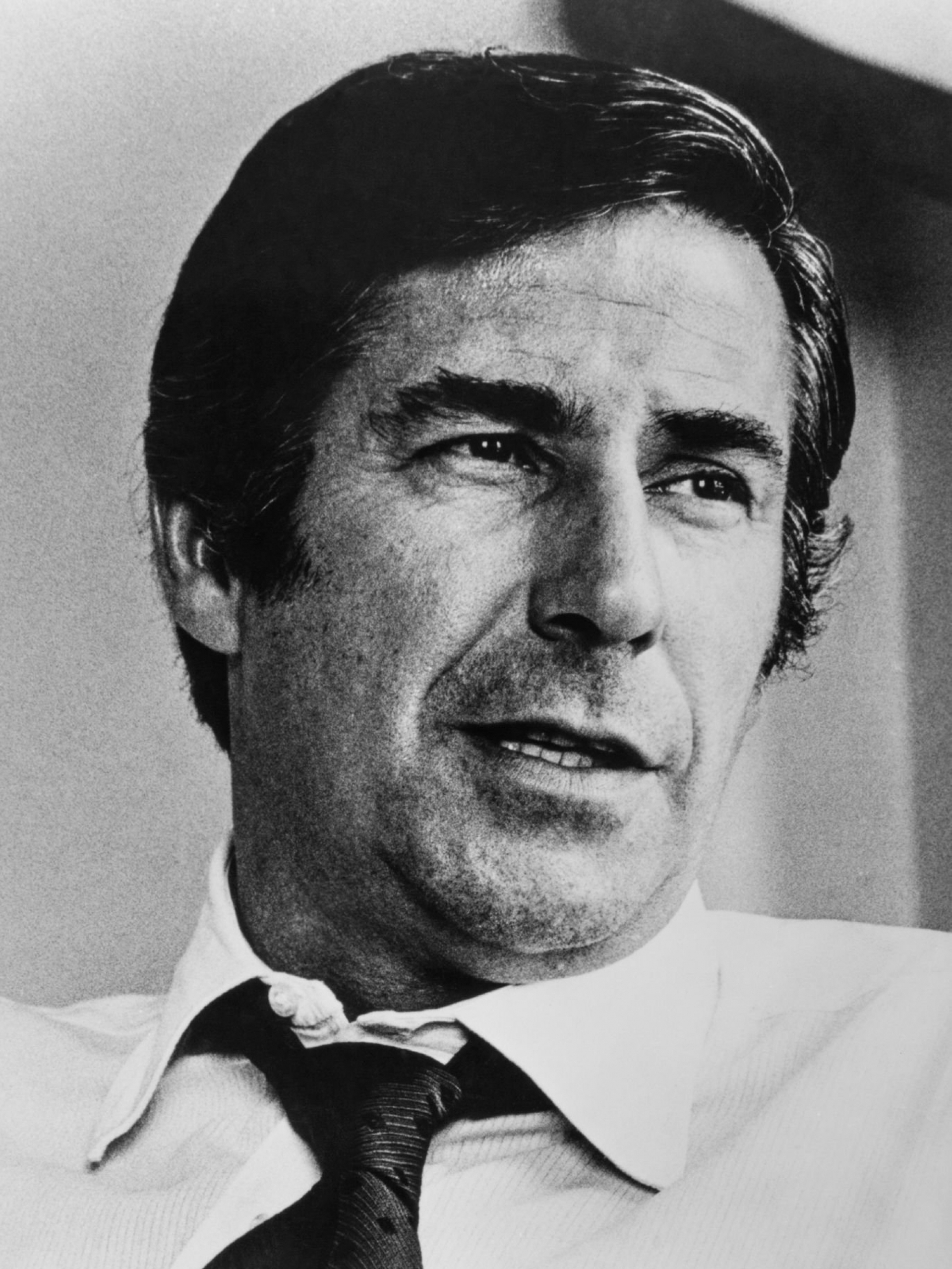

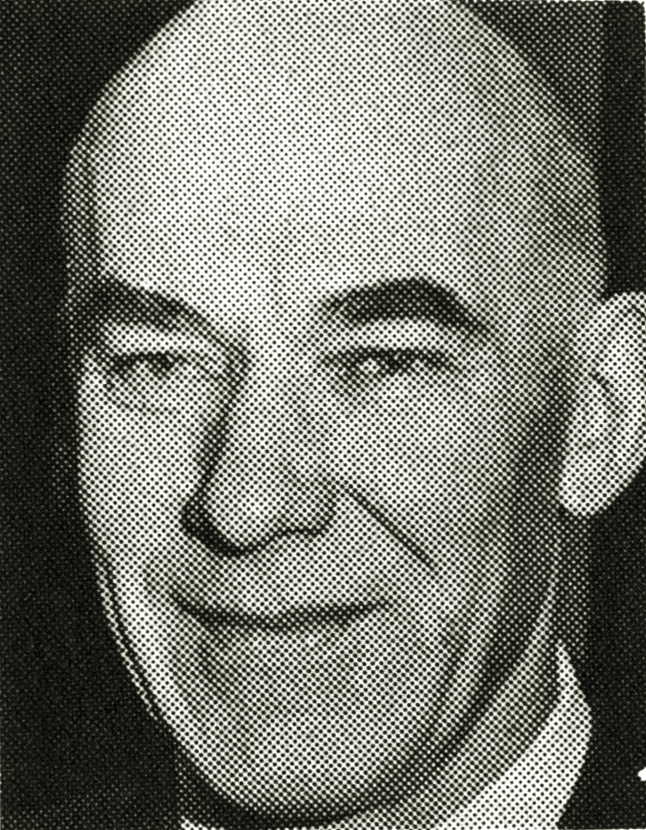
Nominee	Mike Gravel	C. R. Lewis
Party	Democratic	Republican
Popular vote	54,361	38,914
Percentage	58.28%	41.72%
- Results by borough and census area Gravel: 50–60% 60–70% 70–80% 80–90% Lewis: 50–60%
U.S. senator before election
Mike Gravel
Democratic
Elected U.S. Senator
Mike Gravel
Democratic

Incumbent Democrat Mike Gravel won re-election to a second term over Republican State Senator Clyde "C.R." Lewis.

1974 U.S. Senate election in Alaska
Party	Candidate	Votes	%
Democratic	Mike Gravel (Incumbent)	54,361	58.28
Republican	C. R. Lewis	38,914	41.72
Majority		15,447	16.56
Turnout		93,275	
Democratic hold			

== Arizona ==
Arizona election
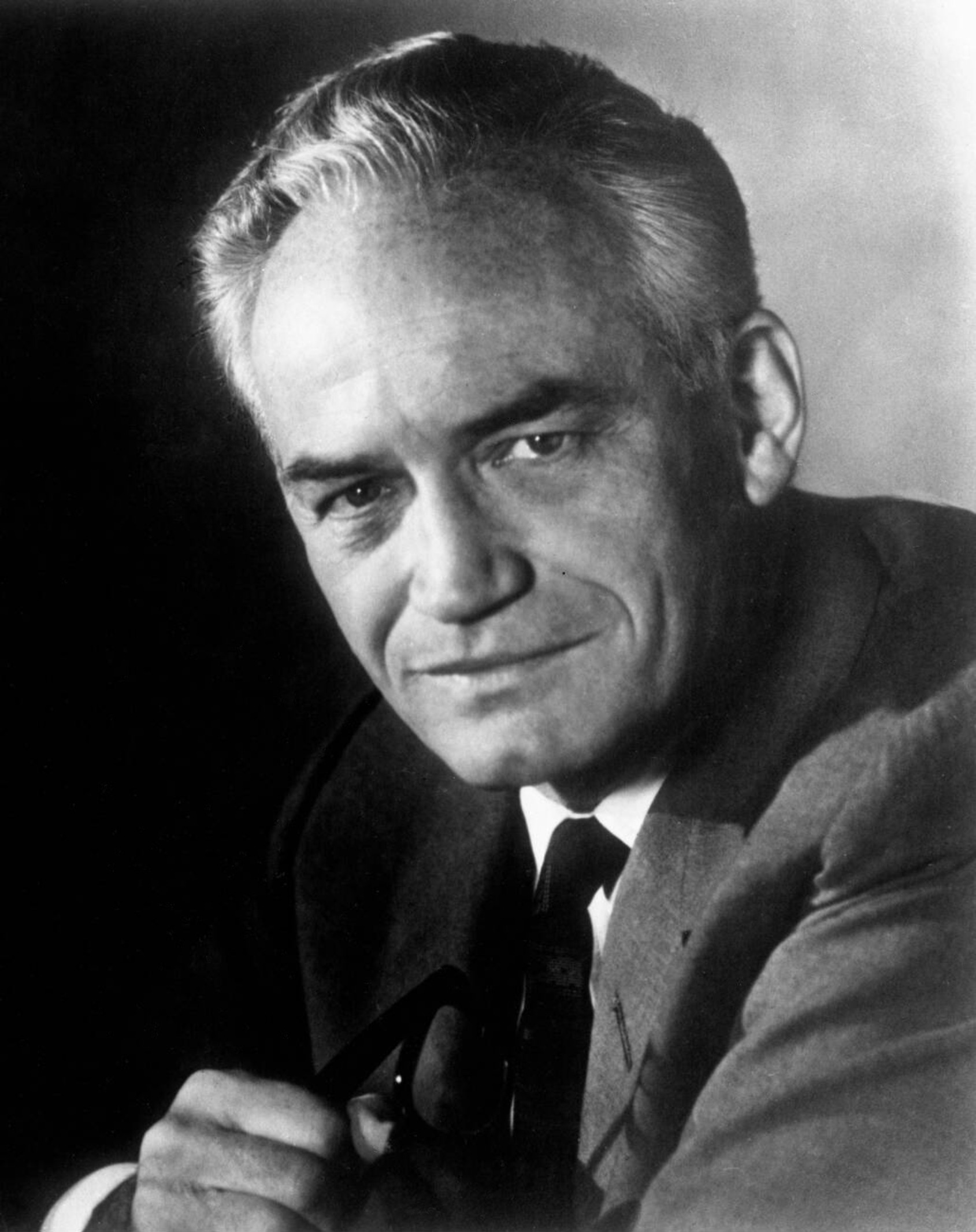

Nominee	Barry Goldwater	Jonathan Marshall
Party	Republican	Democratic
Popular vote	320,396	229,523
Percentage	58.26%	41.74%
- County results Goldwater: 50–60% 60–70% Marshall: 50–60% 60–70%
U.S. senator before election
Barry Goldwater
Republican
Elected U.S. Senator
Barry Goldwater
Republican

Incumbent Republican Barry Goldwater decided to run for reelection to a fourth term, after returning to the U.S. Senate in 1968 following his failed Presidential run in 1964 against Lyndon B. Johnson. Goldwater defeated Democratic Party nominee philanthropist Jonathan Marshall in the general election.

Democratic primary election
Party	Candidate	Votes	%
Democratic	Jonathan Marshall	79,225	53.55
Democratic	George Oglesby, attorney	36,262	24.51
Democratic	William Mathews Feighan	32,449	21.93
Total votes		147,936	100.00

1974 United States Senate election in Arizona
Party	Candidate	Votes	%
Republican	Barry Goldwater (Incumbent)	320,396	58.26
Democratic	Jonathan Marshall	229,523	41.74
Majority		90,873	16.52
Turnout		549,919	
Republican hold			

== Arkansas ==
Arkansas election
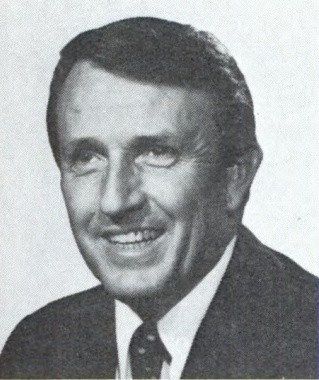

Nominee	Dale Bumpers	John H. Jones
Party	Democratic	Republican
Popular vote	461,056	82,026
Percentage	84.90%	15.10%
- County Results; Bumpers: 60–70% 70–80% 80–90% >90%
U.S. senator before election
J. William Fulbright
Democratic
Elected U.S. Senator
Dale Bumpers
Democratic

Incumbent Democrat J. William Fulbright lost renomination to Governor of Arkansas Dale Bumpers. Bumpers then won the general election easily.

1974 U.S. Senate Democratic primary election in Arkansas, May 28, 1974
Party	Candidate	Votes	%
Democratic	Dale Bumpers	380,748	65.04
Democratic	J. William Fulbright (Incumbent)	204,630	34.96
Turnout			30.44
Total votes		543,082	

1974 U.S. Senate general election in Arkansas
Party	Candidate	Votes	%	±%
Democratic	Dale Bumpers	461,056	84.90	▲25.75
Republican	John H. Jones	82,026	15.10	▼25.75
Majority		379,030	69.80	
Total votes		93,275	100.00	
Turnout		543,082	28.24	
Democratic hold		Swing		

== California ==
California election
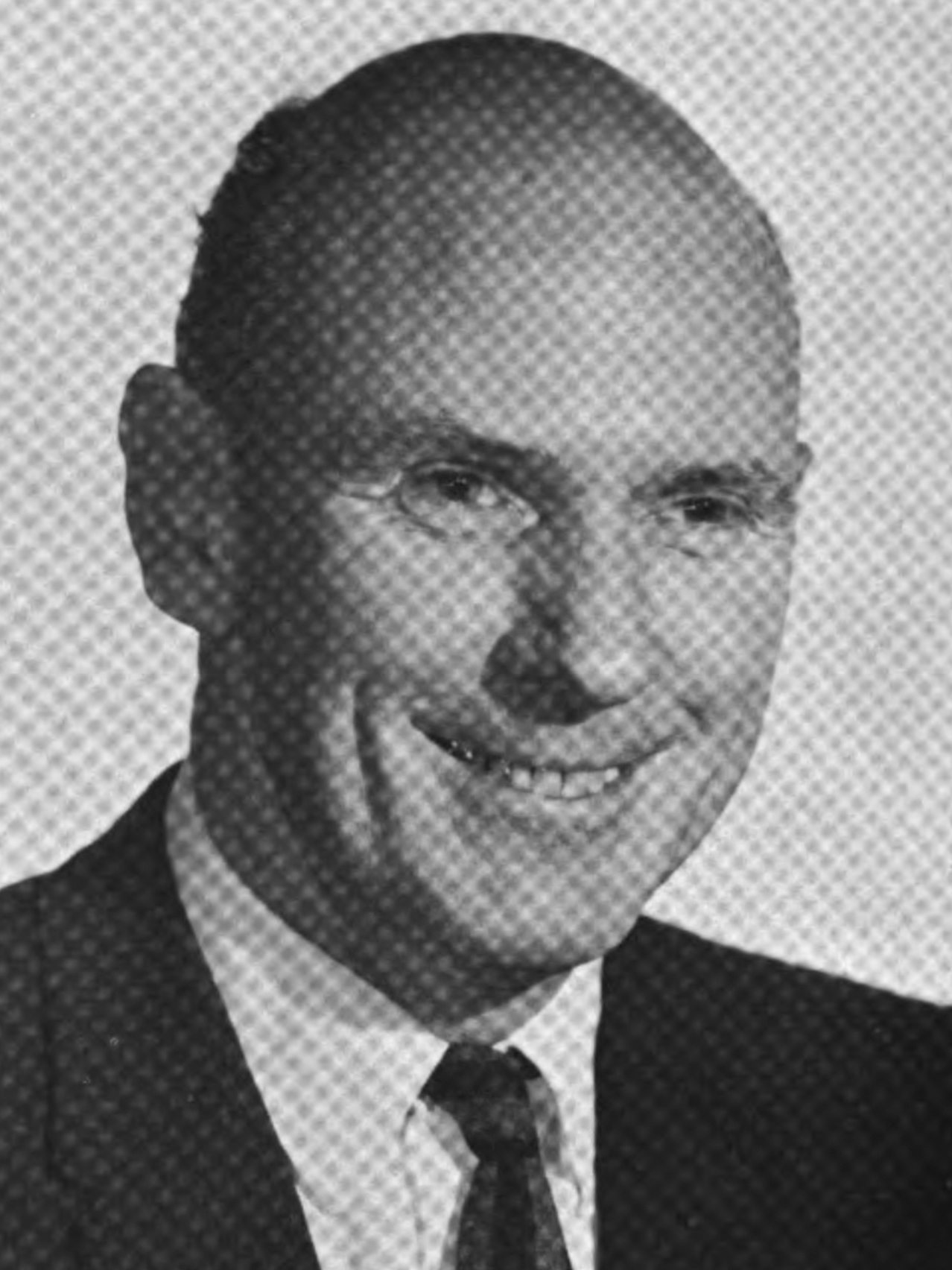

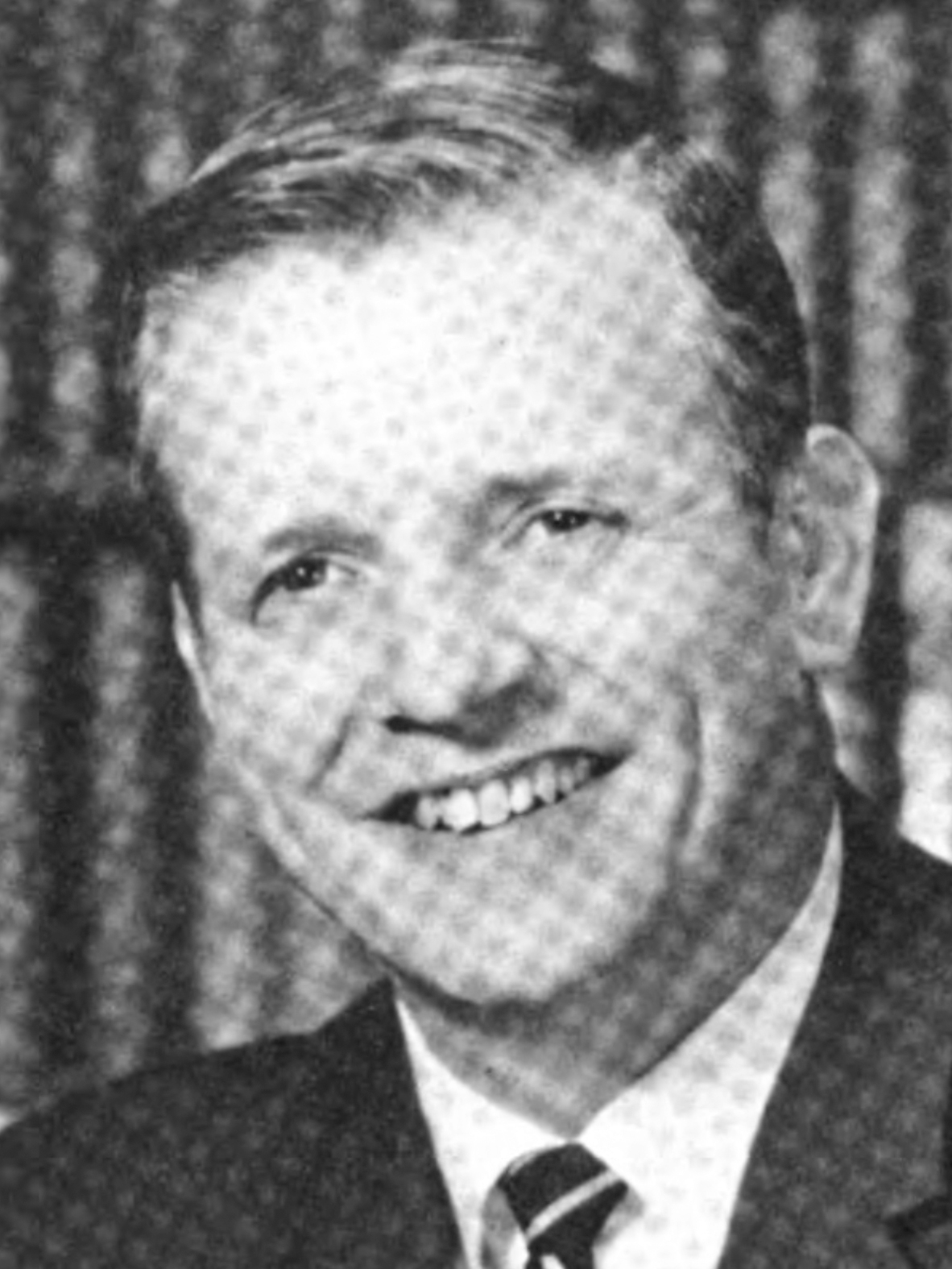
Nominee	Alan Cranston	H. L. Richardson
Party	Democratic	Republican
Popular vote	3,693,160	2,210,267
Percentage	60.52%	36.22%
- County results Cranston: 40-50% 50–60% 60–70% 70–80% Richardson: 40–50%
U.S. senator before election
Alan Cranston
Democratic
Elected U.S. Senator
Alan Cranston
Democratic

Incumbent Democrat Alan Cranston won re-election to a second term over Republican H. L. Richardson, California State Senator.

1974 United States Senate election in California Results
Party	Candidate	Votes	%
Democratic	Alan Cranston (Incumbent)	3,639,334	60.54
Republican	H. L. Richardson	2,176,315	36.20
American Independent	Jack McCoy	100,111	1.67
Peace and Freedom	Gayle M. Justice	95,394	1.59
Majority		1,463,019	24.34
Turnout		6,011,154	
Democratic hold			

== Colorado ==
Colorado election
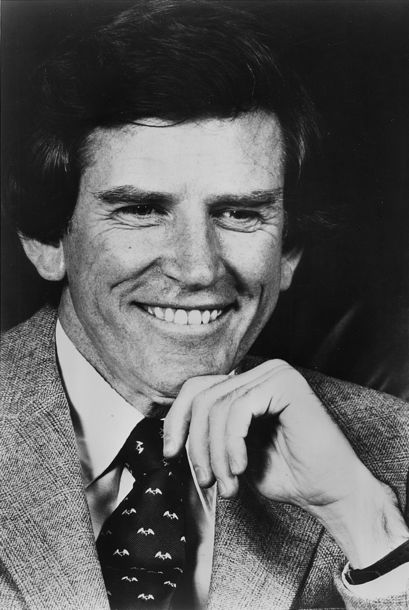

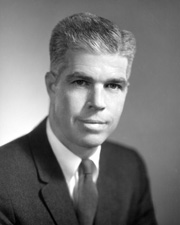
Nominee	Gary Hart	Peter Dominick
Party	Democratic	Republican
Popular vote	471,691	325,508
Percentage	57.23%	39.50%
- County results Hart: 40–50% 50–60% 60–70% Dominick: 40-50% 50–60% 60–70%
U.S. senator before election
Peter Dominick
Republican
Elected U.S. Senator
Gary Hart
Democratic

Incumbent Republican Peter H. Dominick ran for re-election to a third term, but was defeated by Democratic challenger Gary Hart, the campaign manager for George McGovern in 1972.

1974 United States Senate election in Colorado Results
Party	Candidate	Votes	%
Democratic	Gary Hart	471,688	57.23
Republican	Peter H. Dominick (Incumbent)	325,526	39.50
Independent	John M. King	16,131	1.96
Prohibition	Joseph Fred Hyskell	8,404	1.02
American	Henry John Olshaw	2,394	0.29
None	Write-Ins	28	0.00
Majority		146,162	7.73
Turnout		824,171	
Democratic gain from Republican			

== Connecticut ==
Connecticut election
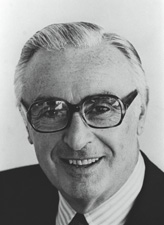

Nominee	Abraham Ribicoff	James Brannen III
Party	Democratic	Republican
Popular vote	690,820	372,055
Percentage	63.68%	34.29%
- Ribicoff: 50–60% 60–70% 70–80% Brannen: 40–50% 50–60%
U.S. senator before election
Abraham Ribicoff
Democratic
Elected U.S. Senator
Abraham Ribicoff
Democratic

Incumbent Democrat Abraham Ribicoff won re-election to a third term over Republican challenger James Brannen III.

1974 United States Senate election in Connecticut Results
Party	Candidate	Votes	%
Democratic	Abraham A. Ribicoff (Incumbent)	690,820	63.67
Republican	James H. Brannen III	372,055	34.29
George Wallace Party	Arthur F. Capozzi Jr.	19,184	1.77
American	Norman L. Rochon	2,682	0.25
None	Write-Ins	177	0.02
Majority		318,765	29.38
Turnout		1,084,918	
Democratic hold			

== Florida ==
Florida election
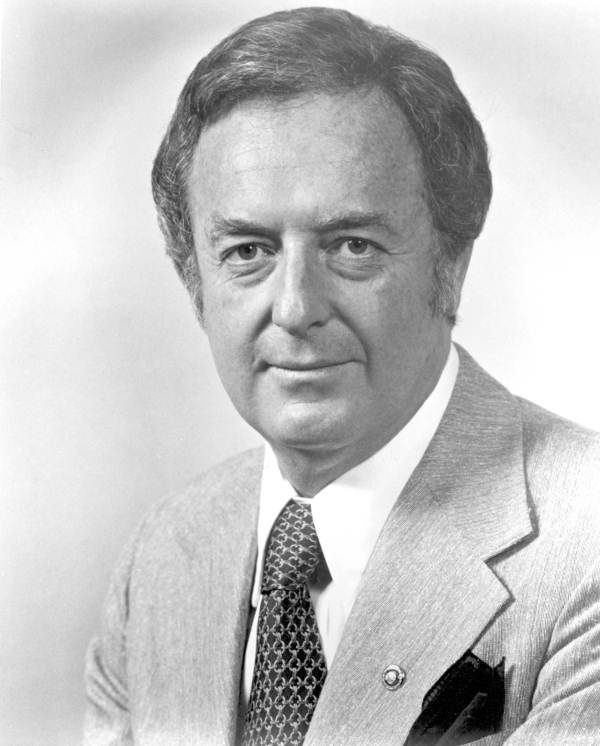

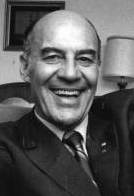
Nominee	Richard Stone	Jack Eckerd
Party	Democratic	Republican
Popular vote	781,031	736,674
Percentage	43.38%	40.91%
Nominee	John Grady
Party	American Independent
Popular vote	282,659
Percentage	15.70%
- County results Stone: 30–40% 40–50% 50–60% 60–70% Eckerd: 30–40% 40–50% 50–60% 60–70% Grady: 40–50%
U.S. senator before election
Edward Gurney
Republican
Elected U.S. Senator
Richard Stone
Democratic

Incumbent Republican Edward Gurney declined to seek a second term after being indicted for taking bribes in return for his influence with the Federal Housing Administration.

The primary for the Republican nomination pitted Eckerd drug store owner Jack Eckerd against Florida Public Service Commissioner Paula Hawkins. Eckerd won handily, receiving approximately 67.5% of the vote.

Republican primary results
Party	Candidate	Votes	%
Republican	Jack Eckerd	186,897	67.49
Republican	Paula Hawkins	90,049	32.52
Total votes		276,946	100.00

The Democratic primary, however, was a crowded field with eleven candidates vying for the nomination. Because no candidate received a majority of the votes, U.S. Representative Bill Gunter and Secretary of State of Florida Richard Stone advanced to a run-off election. Stone won by a small margin of 1.68%.

Democratic primary results
Party	Candidate	Votes	%
Democratic	Richard Stone	236,185	29.80
Democratic	Bill Gunter	157,301	19.85
Democratic	Richard A. Pettigrew	146,728	18.51
Democratic	Mallory Horne	90,684	11.44
Democratic	Glenn W. Turner	51,326	6.48
Democratic	George Balmer	24,408	3.08
Democratic	Burton Young	23,199	2.93
Democratic	Bob Brewster	19,913	2.51
Democratic	David B. Higginbottom	17,401	1.64
Democratic	Duaine E. Macon	14,961	1.89
Total votes		782,106	100.00

Democratic primary runoff results
Party	Candidate	Votes	%
Democratic	Richard Stone	321,683	50.84
Democratic	Bill Gunter	311,044	49.16
Total votes		632,727	100.00

Thus, Eckerd and Stone faced off in the general election. John Grady, a family physician and member of George Wallace's American Independent Party, performed exceptionally well for a third party candidate. Grady may have split the conservative vote, allowing for Stone to win. On election day, Stone received 43.38% of the vote, Eckerd garnered 40.91% of the vote, and Grady acquired 15.7% of the vote.

General election
Party	Candidate	Votes	%
Democratic	Richard Stone	781,031	43.38%
Republican	Jack Eckerd	736,674	40.91
American Independent	John Grady	282,659	15.70
Independent	Jim Fair	117	0.01
Independent	Henry J. Matthew	35	<0.01
Independent	Hortense L. Arvan	13	<0.01
Independent	Timothy L. "Tim" Adams	10	<0.01
Majority		44,357	3.32
Turnout		1,800,539	
Democratic gain from Republican			

== Georgia ==
Georgia election
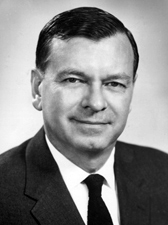

Nominee	Herman Talmadge	Jerry R. Johnson
Party	Democratic	Republican
Popular vote	627,376	246,865
Percentage	71.76%	28.24%
- County results Talmadge: 50–60% 60–70% 70–80% 80–90% >90%
U.S. senator before election
Herman Talmadge
Democratic
Elected U.S. Senator
Herman Talmadge
Democratic

Incumbent Democrat Herman Talmadge won re-election to a fourth term over Republican challenger Jerry Johnson.

1974 United States Senate election in Georgia Results
Party	Candidate	Votes	%
Democratic	Herman Talmadge (Incumbent)	627,376	71.74
Republican	Jerry Johnson	246,866	28.23
Write-in	Write-Ins	313	0.04
Majority		380,510	43.51
Turnout		874,555	
Democratic hold			

== Hawaii ==
Hawaii election
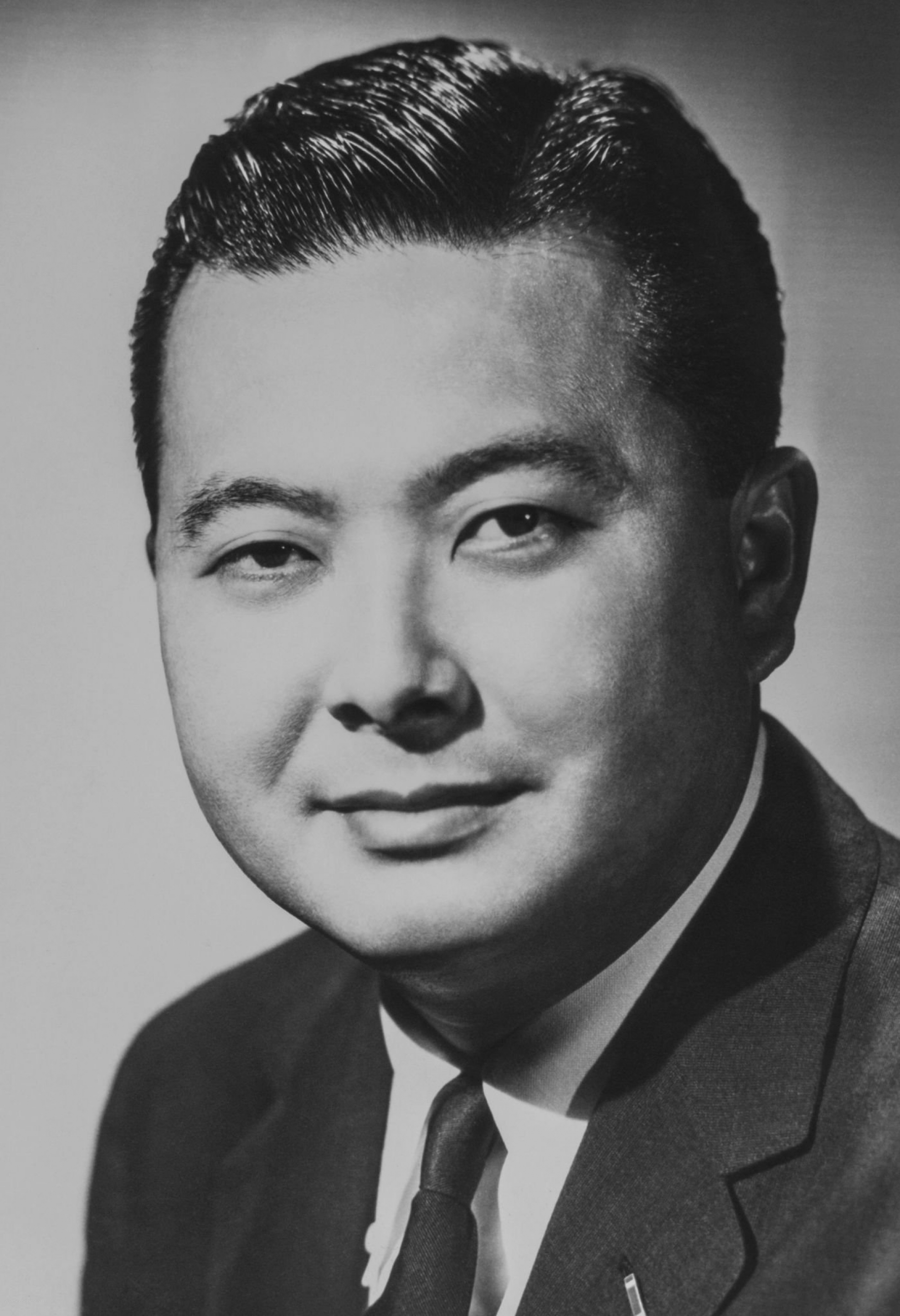

Nominee	Daniel Inouye	James Kimmel
Party	Democratic	People's
Popular vote	207,454	42,767
Percentage	82.91%	17.09%
- County results Inouye: 80–90%
U.S. senator before election
Daniel Inouye
Democratic
Elected U.S. Senator
Daniel Inouye
Democratic

Incumbent Democrat Daniel Inouye won re-election to a third term over Populist challenger James D. Kimmel.

1974 United States Senate election in Hawaii Results
Party	Candidate	Votes	%
Democratic	Daniel Inouye (Incumbent)	207,454	82.91
People's	James D. Kimmel	42,767	17.09
Majority		164,687	65.82
Turnout		250,221	
Democratic hold			

== Idaho ==
Idaho election
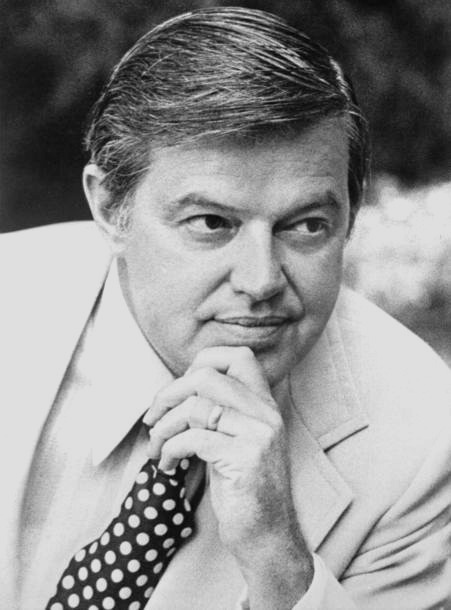

Nominee	Frank Church	Robert L. Smith
Party	Democratic	Republican
Popular vote	145,140	109,072
Percentage	56.07%	42.14%
- County results Church: 40–50% 50–60% 60–70% 70–80% Smith: 50-60% 60-70%
U.S. senator before election
Frank Church
Democratic
Elected U.S. Senator
Frank Church
Democratic

Incumbent Democrat Frank Church won re-election to a fourth term in office, defeating Republican Bob Smith.

1974 United States Senate election in Idaho Results
Party	Candidate	Votes	%
Democratic	Frank Church (Incumbent)	145,140	56.07
Republican	Robert L. Smith	109,072	42.14
American	Jean Stoddard	4,635	1.79
Majority		36,068	13.93
Turnout		258,847	
Democratic hold			

== Illinois ==
Illinois election
- Turnout: 49.35%
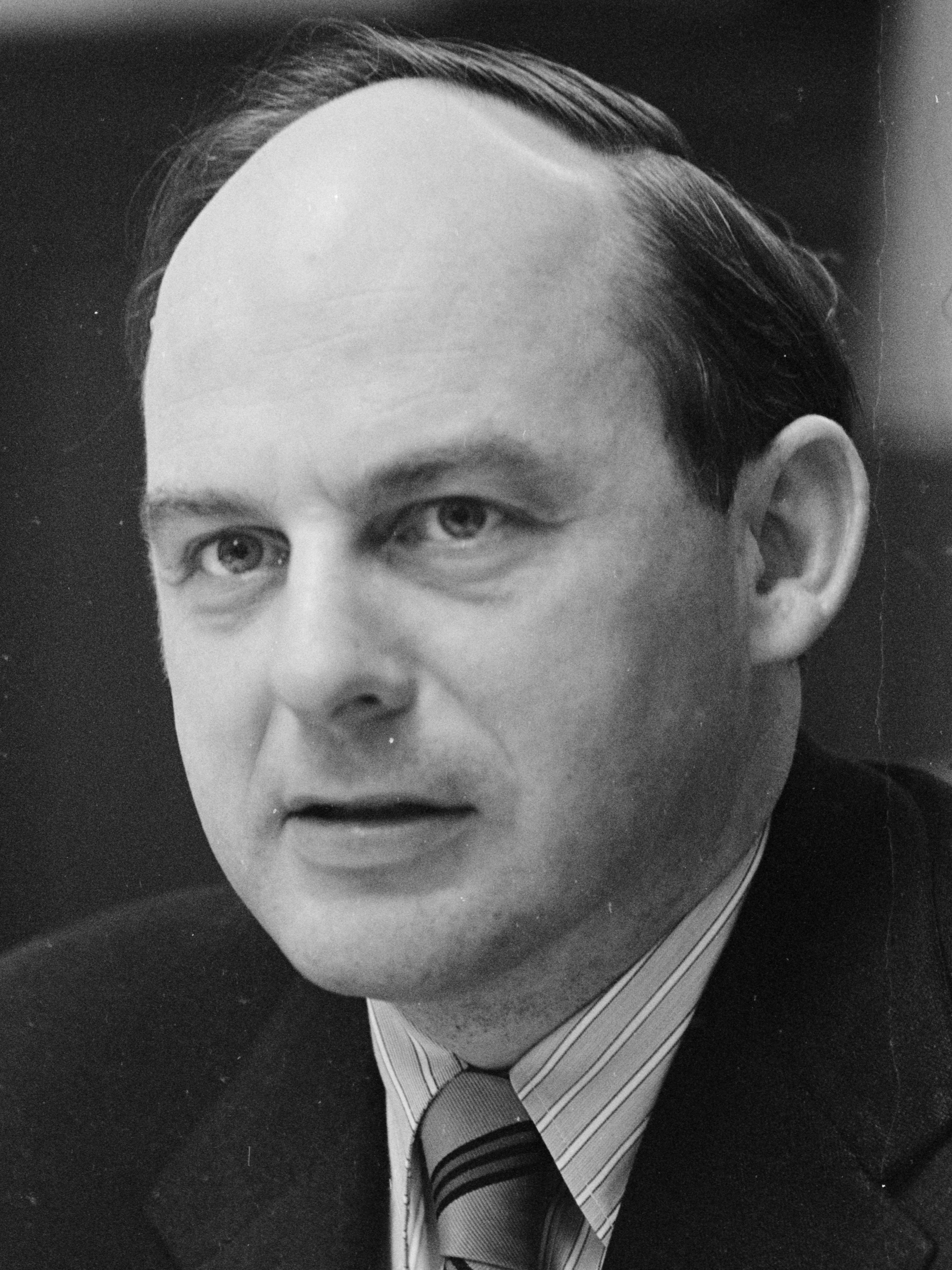

Nominee	Adlai Stevenson III	George Burditt
Party	Democratic	Republican
Popular vote	1,811,496	1,084,884
Percentage	62.15%	37.22%
- County Results; Stevenson: 50–60% 60–70% 70–80% Burditt: 50–60% 60–70%
U.S. senator before election
Adlai Stevenson III
Democratic
Elected U.S. Senator
Adlai Stevenson III
Democratic

Incumbent Democratic U.S. Senator Adlai Stevenson III, who was first elected in a special election in 1970, was re-elected to a second term in office, defeating Republican George Burditt by a large margin of nearly 800,000 votes.

1974 United States Senate election in Illinois Results
Party	Candidate	Votes	%
Democratic	Adlai Stevenson III (Incumbent)	1,811,496	62.15
Republican	George M. Burditt	1,084,884	37.22
Socialist Workers	Edward Thomas Heisler	12,413	0.43
Communist	Ishmael Flory	5,873	0.20
Majority		726,612	24.93
Turnout		2,914,666	
Democratic hold			

== Indiana ==
Indiana election
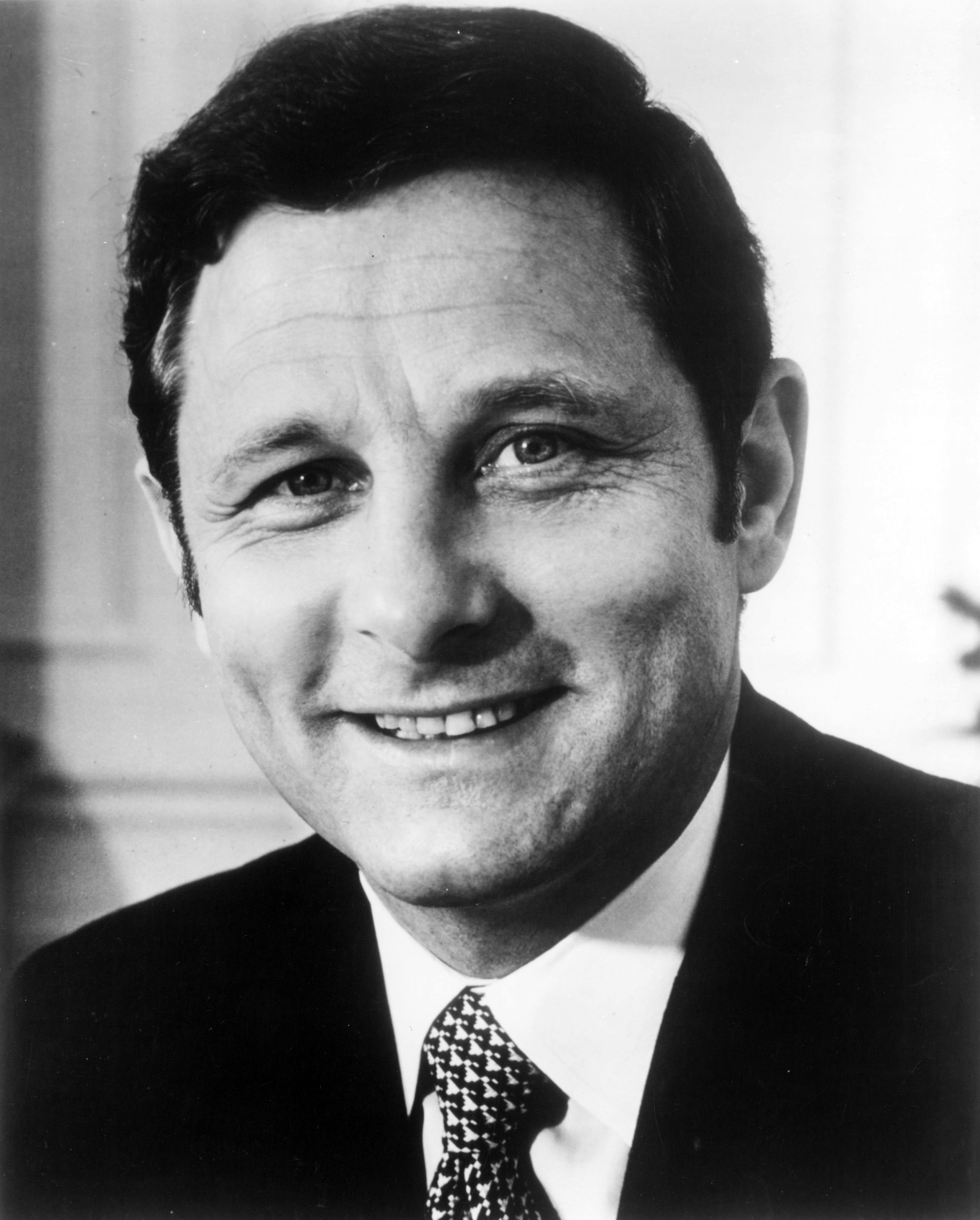

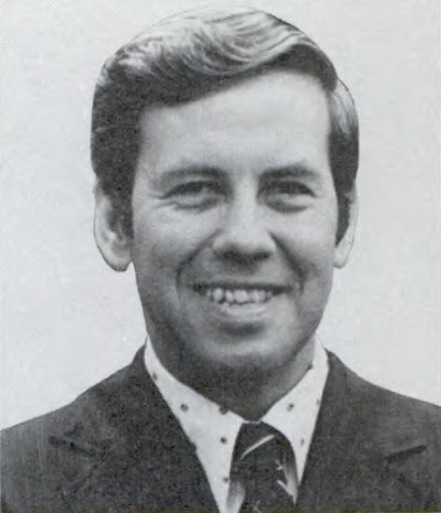
Nominee	Birch Bayh	Richard Lugar
Party	Democratic	Republican
Popular vote	889,269	814,117
Percentage	50.73%	46.44%
- Results by county Bayh: 40-50% 50–60% 60–70% Lugar: 40–50% 50–60% 60-70%
U.S. senator before election
Birch Bayh
Democratic
Elected U.S. Senator
Birch Bayh
Democratic

Incumbent Democratic U.S. Senator Birch Bayh was re-elected to a third consecutive term in office, defeating Mayor of Indianapolis Richard Lugar.

1974 United States Senate election in Indiana Results
Party	Candidate	Votes	%
Democratic	Birch Bayh (Incumbent)	889,269	50.73
Republican	Richard Lugar	814,117	46.44
American	Don L. Lee	49,592	2.83
Majority		75,152	4.29
Turnout		1,752,978	
Democratic hold			

== Iowa ==
Iowa election

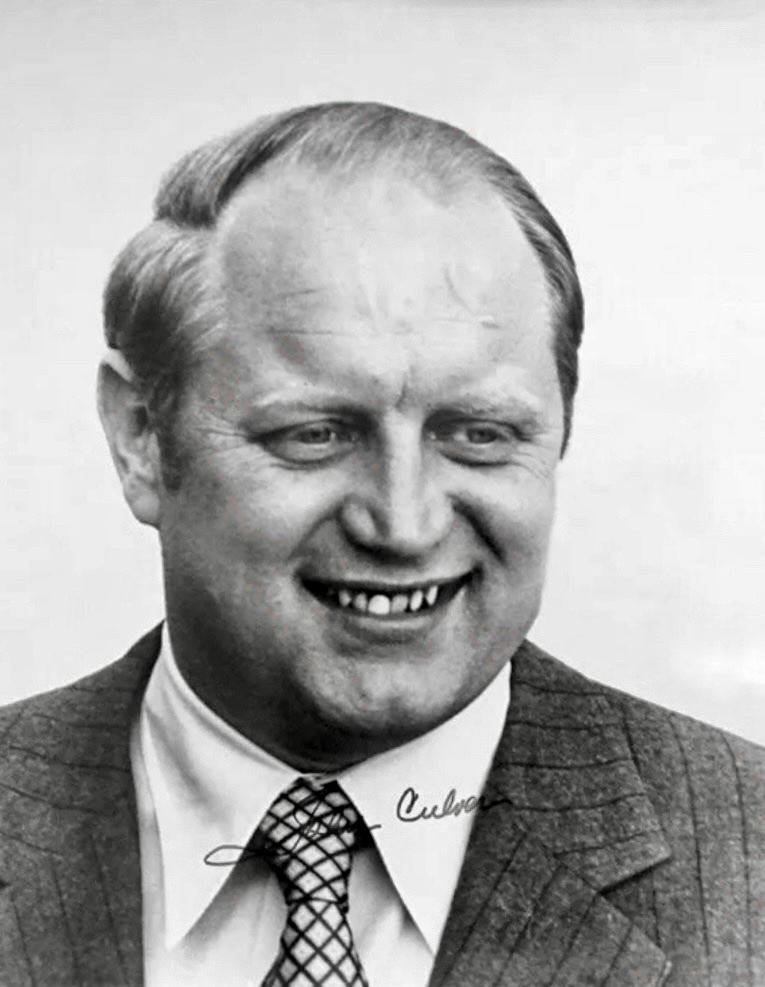

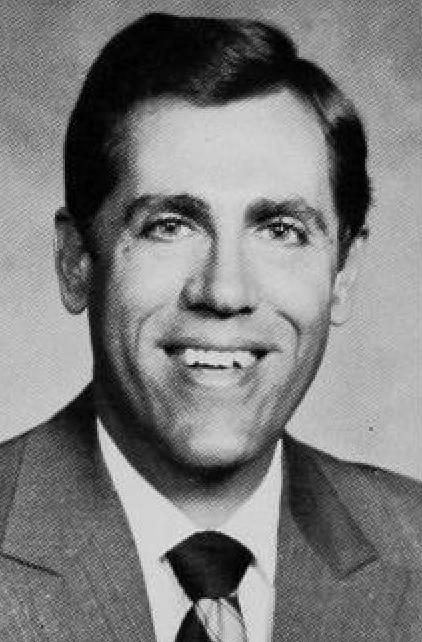
Nominee	John Culver	David M. Stanley
Party	Democratic	Republican
Popular vote	462,947	420,546
Percentage	52.04%	47.28%
- County results Culver: 40–50% 50–60% 60–70% Stanley: 40-50% 50-60% 60-70% 70-80%
U.S. senator before election
Harold E. Hughes
Democratic
Elected U.S. Senator
John C. Culver
Democratic

Incumbent Democratic U.S. Senator Harold E. Hughes retired instead of seeking a second term. This open seat was won by five-term U.S. Representative John C. Culver, defeating Republican State Representative David M. Stanley. Culver defeated Stanley by a margin of nearly five points.

1974 United States Senate election in Iowa Results
Party	Candidate	Votes	%
Democratic	John Culver	462,947	52.04
Republican	David M. Stanley	420,546	47.28
American	Lorin E. Oxley	6,028	0.68
Write-ins		40	0.00
Majority		42,401	4.76
Turnout			
Democratic hold			

== Kansas ==
Kansas election
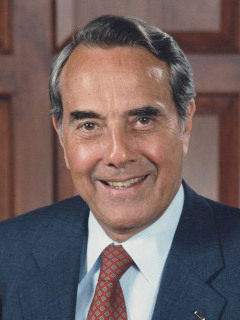

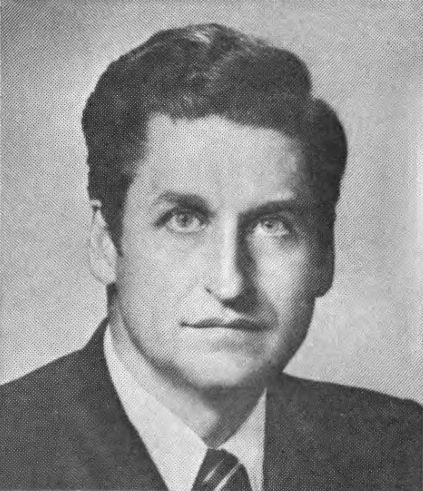
Nominee	Bob Dole	William R. Roy
Party	Republican	Democratic
Popular vote	403,983	390,451
Percentage	50.85%	49.15%
- County results Dole: 50–60% 60–70% Roy: 50–60% 60–70%
U.S. senator before election
Bob Dole
Republican
Elected U.S. Senator
Bob Dole
Republican

U.S. Senator Bob Dole was first elected in 1968 after Frank Carlson retired by a margin of 60-39% over his Democratic opponent. However, in 1974 he faced a closer challenge as he sought a second term. Dole was closely associated with Richard Nixon as chairman of the Republican National Committee from 1971-1972. Dole himself even admitted he was "prepared to lose" the election to William R. Roy, a Topeka physician and two-term Representative from Kansas's 2nd Congressional District. Roy's advertisements contrasted Dole, "who put loyalty to Nixon and his party ahead of loyalty to his state," with Roy, a moderate and former Republican whom they described as "a respected voice for Kansas." Roy's campaign to be the first Democratic Senator from Kansas in decades received an enthusiastic response, and he led in polling for months. "I could go to any event and feel like Caesar coming back to Rome," Roy said. Still, Dole's campaign capitalized on the issue of abortion rights, which was fresh on voters minds in the wake of the Roe v. Wade decision. Roy himself had performed abortions as a physician, and Dole used this to build momentum and overtake Roy in polling.

In the end, Dole narrowly prevailed over Roy by 15,533 votes in the closest election of his 35-year Congressional career.

1974 United States Senate election in Kansas Results
Party	Candidate	Votes	%
Republican	Bob Dole (Incumbent)	403,983	50.85
Democratic	William R. Roy	390,451	49.15
None	Write-Ins	3	0.00
Majority		13,532	1.70
Turnout		794,437	
Republican hold			

== Kentucky ==
Kentucky election
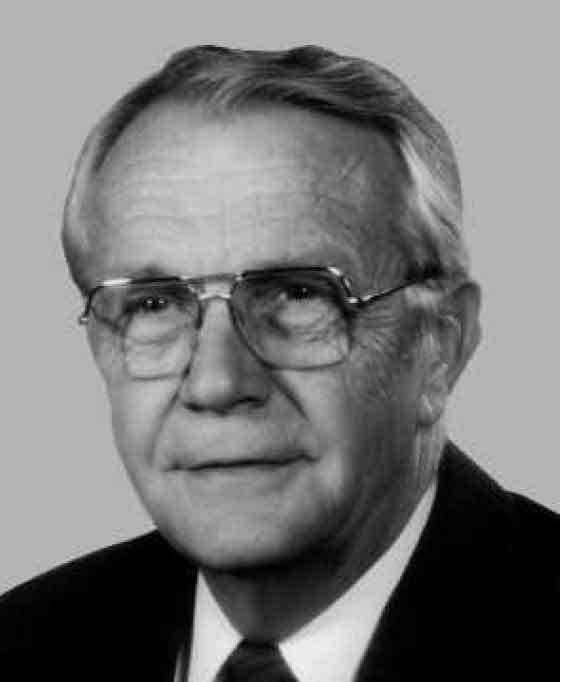

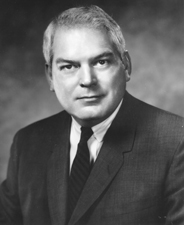
Nominee	Wendell Ford	Marlow Cook
Party	Democratic	Republican
Popular vote	398,887	328,260
Percentage	53.56%	44.08%
- County results Ford: 40–50% 50–60% 60–70% 70–80% Cook: 40-50% 50-60% 60-70% 70-80%
U.S. senator before election
Marlow Cook
Republican
Elected U.S. Senator
Wendell Ford
Democratic

Incumbent Republican U.S. Senator Marlow Cook ran for a second term in office but was defeated by Democratic Governor of Kentucky Wendell Ford.

1974 United States Senate election in Kentucky Results
Party	Candidate	Votes	%
Democratic	Wendell Ford	398,887	53.56
Republican	Marlow Cook (Incumbent)	328,260	44.08
American	William E. Parker	17,551	2.36
Majority		70,627	9.48
Turnout		744,698	
Democratic gain from Republican			

== Louisiana ==
1974 Democratic Senate primary election in Louisiana
- August 17, 1974
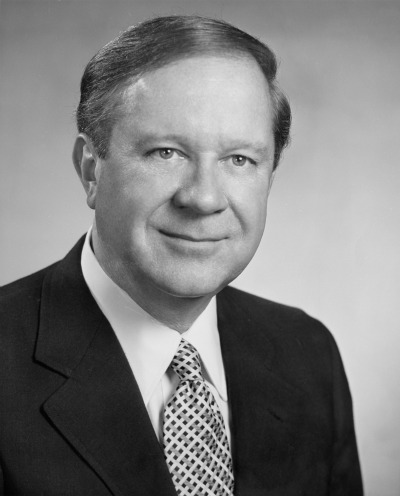

Nominee	Russell B. Long	Sherman A. Bernard	Annie Smart
Party	Democratic	Democratic	Democratic
Popular vote	520,606	131,540	44,341
Percentage	74.75%	18.89%	6.37%
- Parish results Long: 50–60% 60–70% 70–80% 80–90%
U.S. senator before election
Russell Long
Democratic
Elected U.S. Senator
Russell Long
Democratic

Incumbent Democratic Senator Russell B. Long was unopposed for re-election to a sixth term in office.

Democratic primary
Party	Candidate	Votes	%
Democratic	Russell Long (Incumbent)	520,606	74.75
Democratic	Sherman A. Bernard	131,540	18.89
Democratic	Annie Smart	44,341	6.37
Total votes		696,487	100.00

1974 United States Senate election in Louisiana Results
Party	Candidate	Votes	%
Democratic	Russell B. Long (Incumbent)	434,643	100.00
Democratic hold			

== Maryland ==
Maryland election
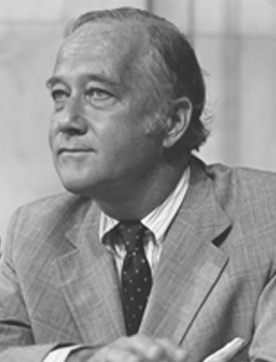

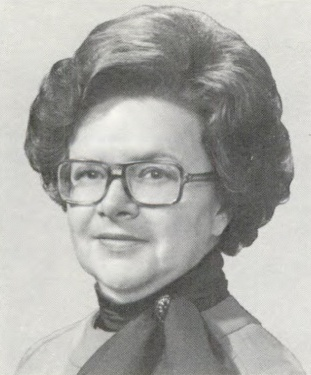
Nominee	Charles Mathias	Barbara Mikulski
Party	Republican	Democratic
Popular vote	503,223	374,663
Percentage	57.32%	42.68%
- County results Mathias: 50–60% 60–70% 70–80% Mikulski: 50–60%
U.S. senator before election
Charles Mathias
Republican
Elected U.S. Senator
Charles Mathias
Republican

Incumbent Republican Charles Mathias won re-election to a second term. As a Republican representing heavily-Democratic Maryland, Mathias faced a potentially difficult re-election bid for the 1974 election. State Democrats nominated Barbara Mikulski, then a Baltimore City Councilwoman who was well-known to residents in her city as a social activist, but with limited name recognition in the rest of the state. Mathias was renominated by Republicans, fending off a primary election challenge from conservative doctor Ross Pierpont. Pierpont was never a substantial threat to Mathias, whose lack of competition was due in part to fallout from the Watergate scandal.

As an advocate for campaign finance reform, Mathias refused to accept any contribution over $100 to "avoid the curse of big money that has led to so much trouble in the last year". However, he still managed to raise over $250,000, nearly five times Mikulski's total. Ideologically, Mikulski and Mathias agreed on many issues, such as closing tax loopholes and easing taxes on the middle class. On two issues, however, Mathias argued to reform Congress and the U.S. tax system to address inflation and corporate price fixing, contrary to Mikulski. In retrospect, The Washington Post felt the election was "an intelligent discussion of state, national, and foreign affairs by two smart, well-informed people".

1974 United States Senate election in Maryland
Party	Candidate	Votes	%
Republican	Charles Mathias (Incumbent)	503,223	57.3
Democratic	Barbara A. Mikulski	374,663	42.7
Total votes		877,886	100.00
Majority		129,560	14.6
Republican hold			

== Missouri ==
Missouri election
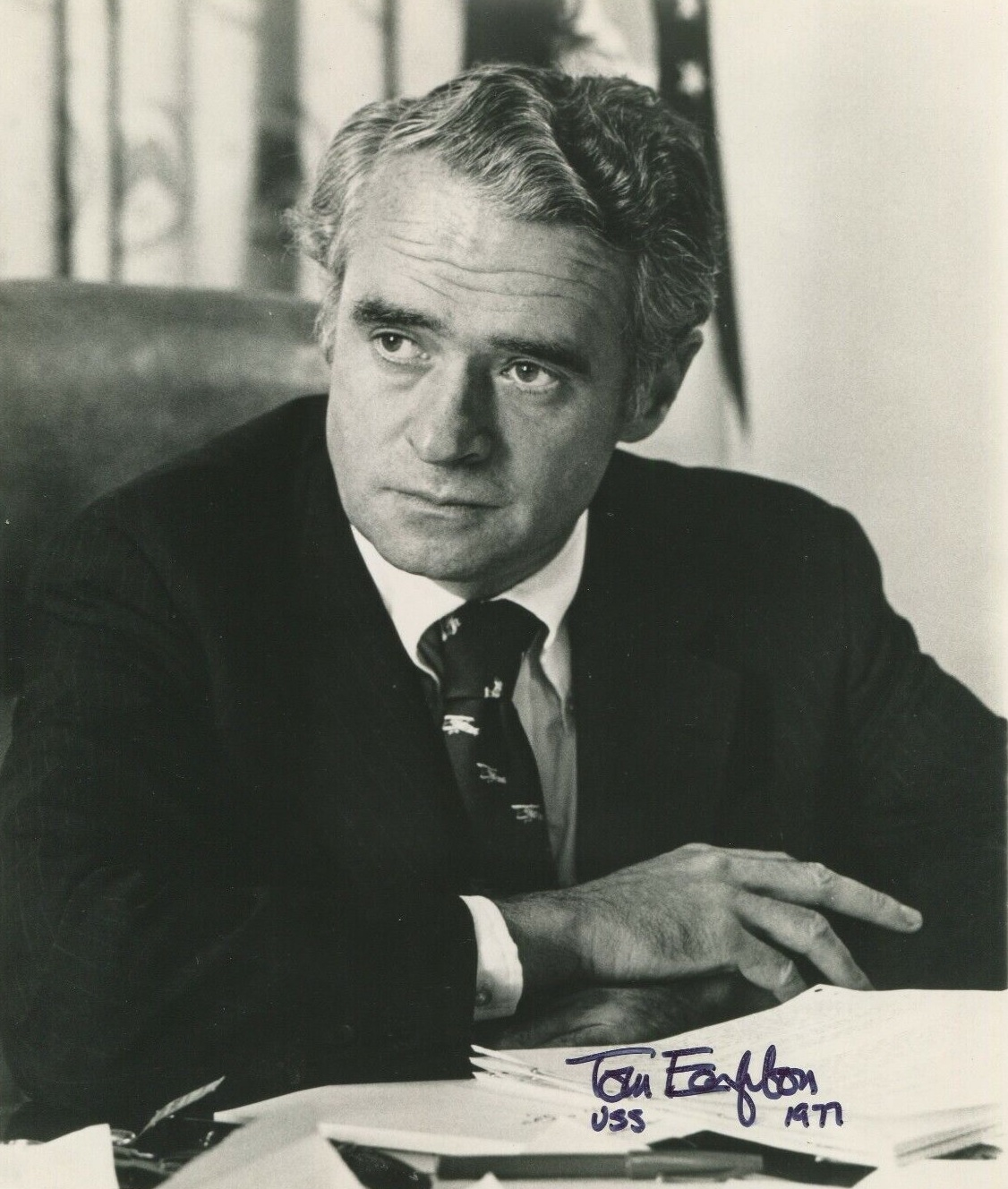

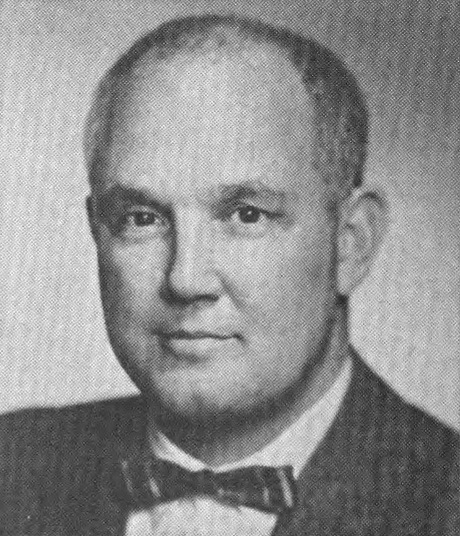
Nominee	Thomas Eagleton	Thomas B. Curtis
Party	Democratic	Republican
Popular vote	735,433	480,900
Percentage	60.07%	39.28%
- County Results; Eagleton: 40–50% 50–60% 60–70% 70–80% Curtis: 40-50% 50-60% 60-70%
U.S. senator before election
Thomas Eagleton
Democratic
Elected U.S. Senator
Thomas Eagleton
Democratic

Thomas Eagleton was first elected in 1968, defeating incumbent U.S. senator Edward V. Long in an upset three-way primary victory. He then defeated Republican Representative Thomas B. Curtis by just over two percentage points. Eagleton served as the initial vice presidential nominee for George McGovern's campaign against incumbent Richard Nixon in 1972. However, Eagleton resigned from the ticket and was replaced by Sargent Shriver after reports surfaced that Eagleton had received electroshock therapy for clinical depression. McGovern, who was trailing Nixon badly in the polls, requested Eagleton's resignation. Despite negative publicity from his vice presidential nomination withdrawal, Eagleton cruised to re-election in a rematch over Curtis, taking over 60% of the vote. This would be Eagleton's largest victory margin for U.S. Senate. In 1980, he faced a close re-election battle against Gene McNary, winning by only about 5 percentage points.

1974 United States Senate election in Missouri Results
Party	Candidate	Votes	%
Democratic	Thomas Eagleton (Incumbent)	735,433	60.07
Republican	Thomas B. Curtis	480,900	39.28
Independent	Cliff Talmage	7,970	0.65
Majority		254,533	20.79
Turnout		1,224,303	
Democratic hold			

== Nevada ==
Nevada election
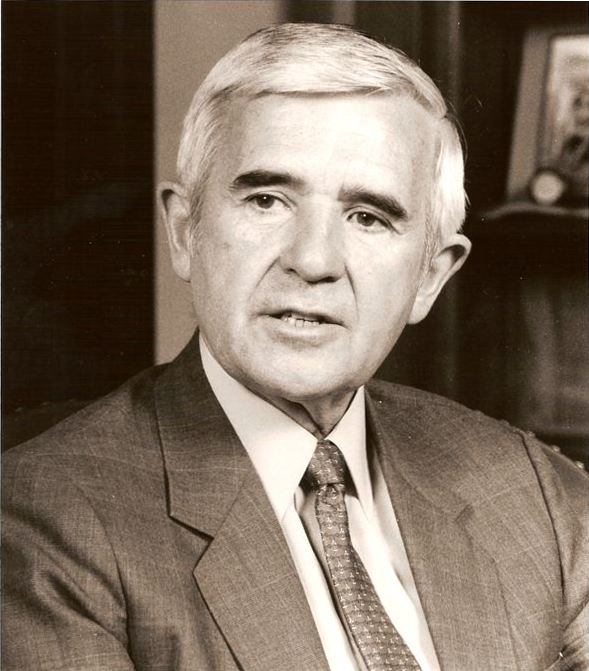

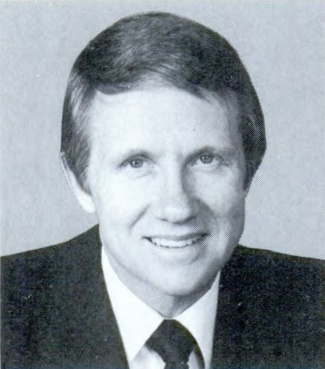
Nominee	Paul Laxalt	Harry Reid
Party	Republican	Democratic
Popular vote	79,605	78,981
Percentage	47.0%	46.6%
Nominee	Jack C. Doyle
Party	Independent American Party (Nevada)
Popular vote	10,887
Percentage	6.42%
- County results Laxalt: 40–50% 50–60% 60–70% Reid: 40–50% 50–60%
U.S. senator before election
Alan Bible
Democratic
Elected U.S. Senator
Paul Laxalt
Republican

Incumbent Democrat Alan Bible decided to retire instead of seeking a fifth term. Republican nominee Paul Laxalt won the open seat.

Former Governor Paul Laxalt won by less than 700 votes, becoming one of the few bright spots in a bad year for Republicans. He beat Lieutenant Governor Harry Reid. Reid would succeed Laxalt twelve years later.

General election
Party	Candidate	Votes	%	±%
Republican	Paul Laxalt	79,605	46.97	+1.73%
Democratic	Harry Reid	78,981	46.60	−8.16%
Independent American Party (Nevada)	Jack C. Doyle	10,887	6.42	
Majority		624	0.37	−9.15%
Turnout		169,473		
Republican gain from Democratic				

== New Hampshire ==
New Hampshire election
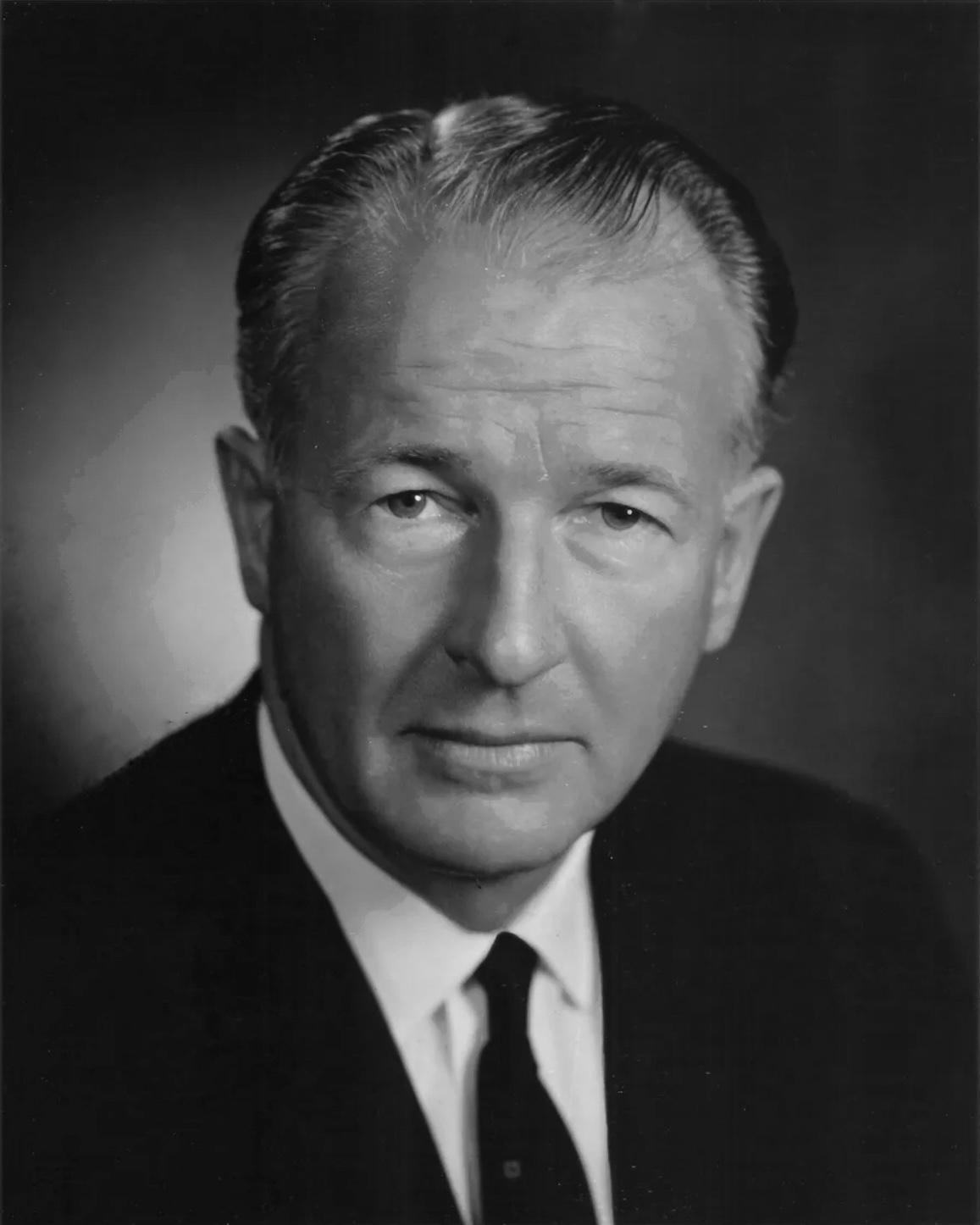

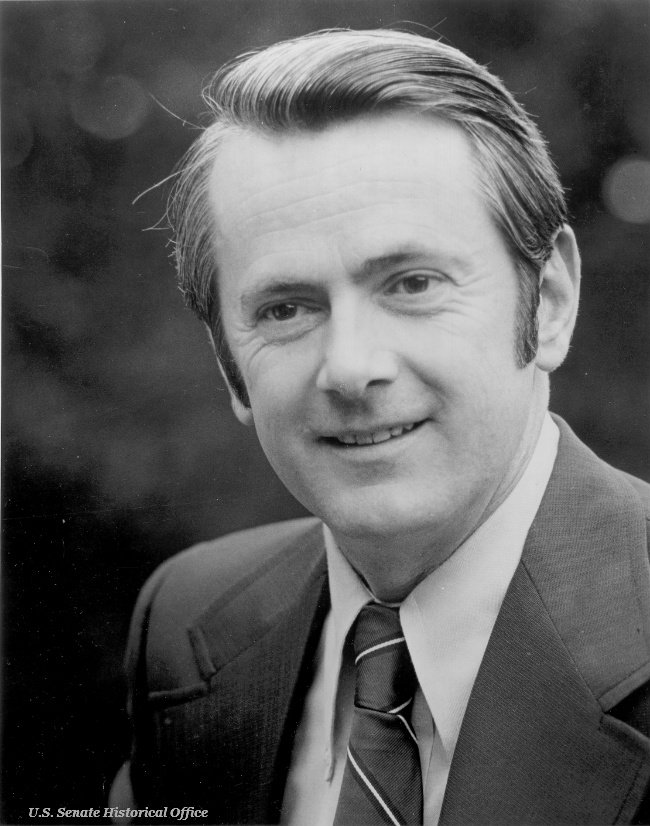
Nominee	Louis C. Wyman	John A. Durkin
Party	Republican	Democratic
Popular vote	110,926	110,924
Percentage	49.66%	49.66%
- Wyman: 40–50% 50–60% 60–70% 70–80% 80–90% Durkin: 40–50% 50–60% 60–70% 70–80% 90-100% No Data/Vote
U.S. senator before election
Norris Cotton
Republican
Elected U.S. Senator
Louis C. Wyman
(Disputed)
Republican

The New Hampshire election resulted in the longest contested election for the U.S. Congress in United States history.

In 1973, then-incumbent senator Norris Cotton announced he would not seek re-election. Republican strategists admitted that it would be tough for their party to hold on to the seat.

The campaign of 1974 pitted Democrat John A. Durkin, who had served as New Hampshire's Insurance Commissioner and as Attorney General, against Republican Louis C. Wyman, a conservative, widely known member of the United States House of Representatives from New Hampshire's 1st congressional district. As Wyman was the more experienced politician, he was predicted by many to win handily.

On election day, Wyman won with a margin of just 355 votes. Durkin immediately demanded a recount, which, completed November 27, 1974, declared Durkin the winner by a margin of 10 votes. Republican Governor Meldrim Thomson Jr. awarded Durkin a provisional certificate of election. However, Wyman demanded another recount in which he prevailed by two votes.

New Hampshire United States Senate Election, 1974: Second Recount
Party	Candidate	Votes	%
Republican	Louis Wyman	110,926	49.6618
Democratic	John A. Durkin	110,924	49.6609
American Independent	Carmen C. Chimento	1,513	0.68
Plurality		2	0.0009
Turnout		223,363	

Wyman promptly appealed to the New Hampshire State Ballot Law Commission. Durkin tried to defeat the appeal in the New Hampshire courts. The state ballot commission conducted its own partial recount and announced on December 24, 1974, that Wyman had won by just two votes. Governor Thomson rescinded Durkin’s certificate, and awarded a new credential to Wyman.

Senator Cotton resigned on December 31, 1974, and Governor Thomson appointed Wyman to fill the remainder of the term, which would expire January 3, 1975.

The election contest was not settled, however, and eventually a new election would be called in 1975.

== New York ==
New York election

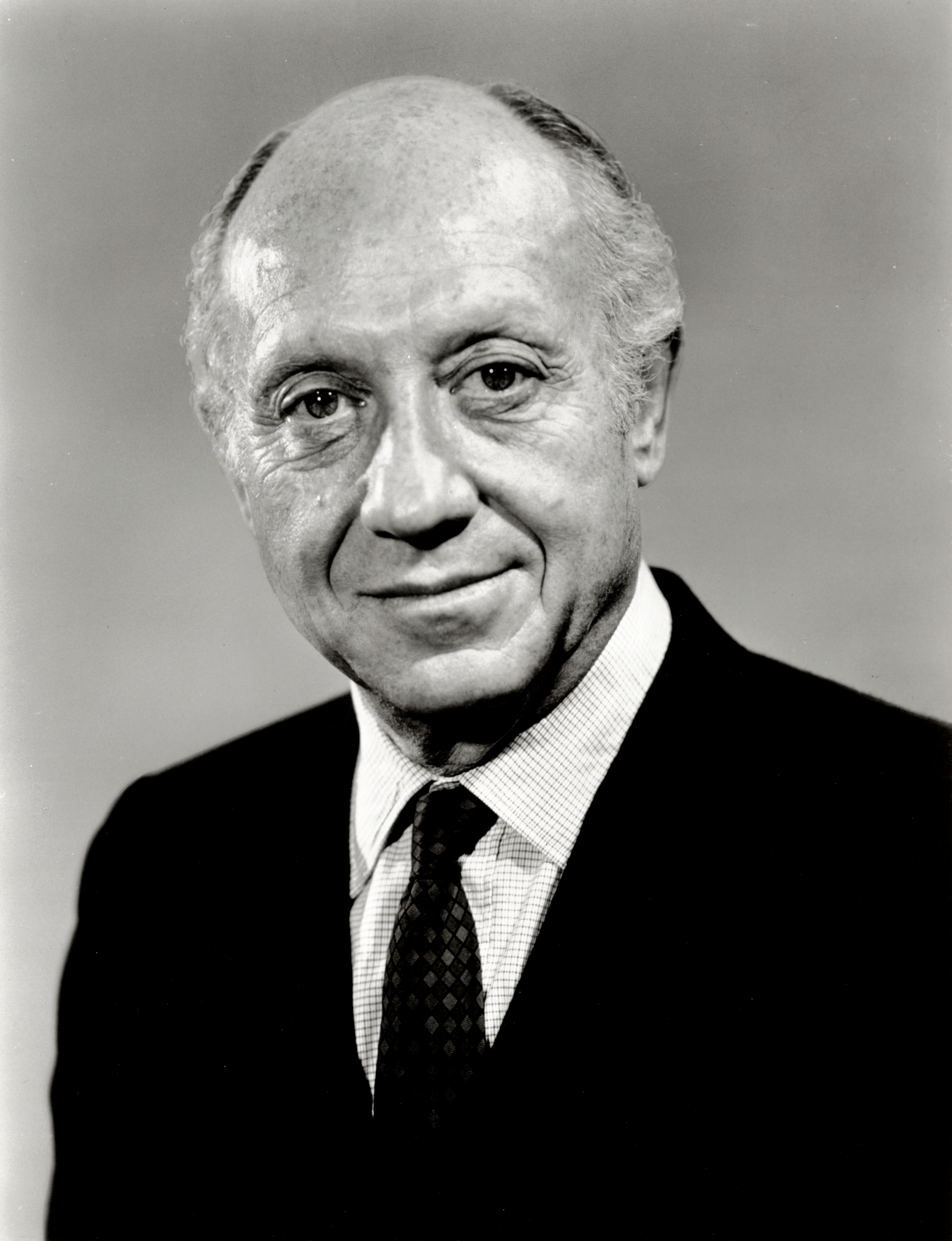

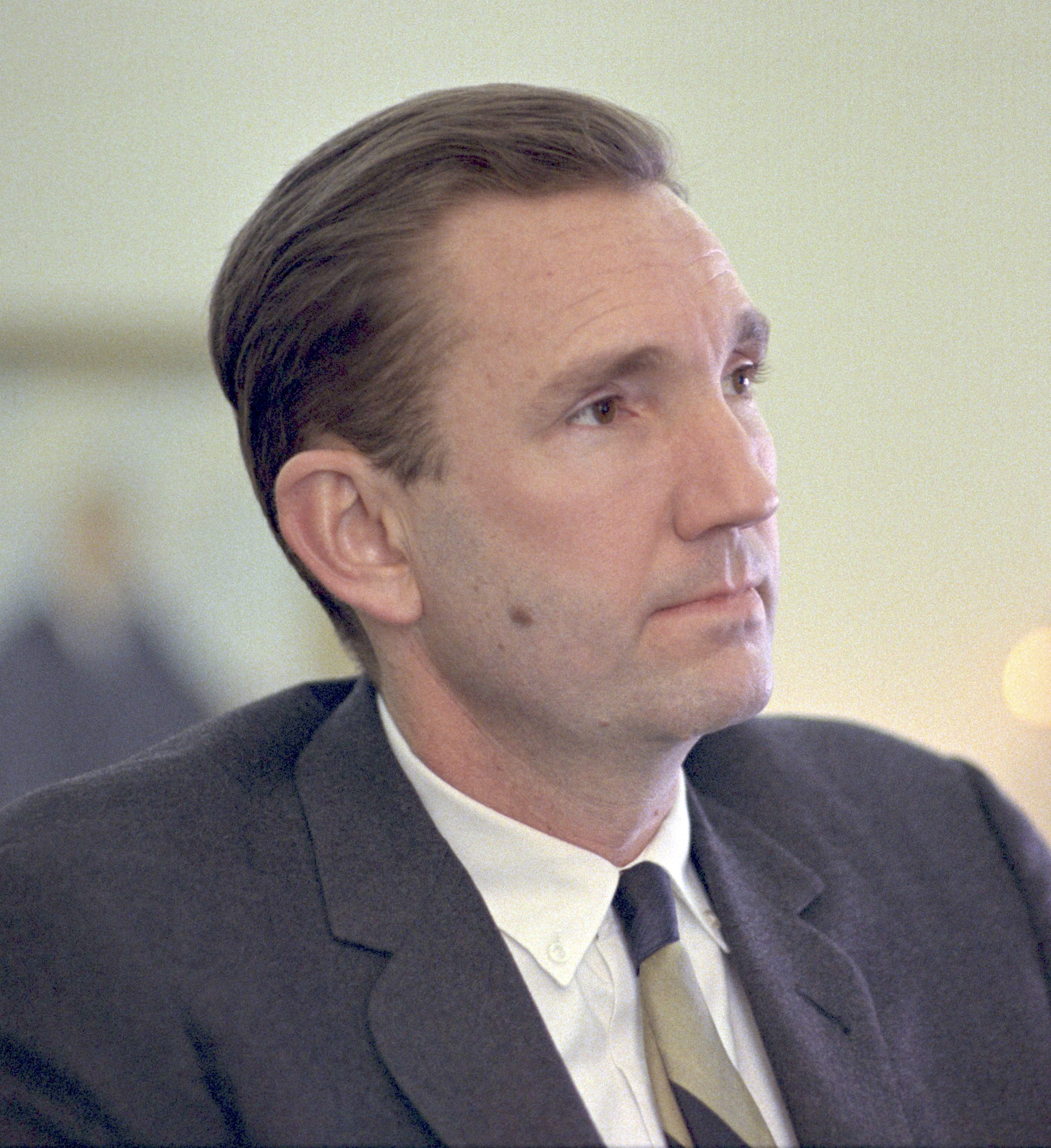

Nominee	Jacob Javits	Ramsey Clark	Barbara A. Keating
Party	Republican	Democratic	Conservative
Alliance	Liberal
Popular vote	2,340,188	1,973,781	822,584
Percentage	45.32%	38.23%	15.93%
- County results Javits: 40–50% 50–60% Clark: 40–50% 50–60%
U.S. senator before election
Jacob Javits
Republican
Elected U.S. Senator
Jacob Javits
Republican

Incumbent Republican U.S. Senator Jacob Javits won against Democratic challenger Ramsey Clark in a three way election.

1974 United States Senate election in New York Results
Party	Candidate	Votes	%
Republican	Jacob Javits (Incumbent)	2,340,188	45.32
Democratic	Ramsey Clark	1,973,781	38.23
Conservative	Barbara A. Keating	822,584	15.93
Socialist Workers	Rebecca Finch	7,727	0.15
Courage	William F Dowling Jr.	7,459	0.14
Socialist Labor	Robert E. Massi	4,037	0.08
Communist	Mildred Edelman	3,876	0.08
U.S. Labor	Elijah C. Boyd Jr.	3,798	0.07
Majority		366,407	7.09
Turnout		5,163,450	
Republican hold			

== North Carolina ==
North Carolina election
- November 5, 1974
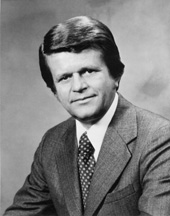

Nominee	Robert Morgan	William Stevens
Party	Democratic	Republican
Popular vote	633,647	386,720
Percentage	61.6%	37.6%
- County results Morgan: 50–60% 60–70% 70–80% 80–90% >90% Stevens: 50–60% 60–70%
U.S. senator before election
Sam Ervin
Democratic
Elected U.S. Senator
Robert Morgan
Democratic

Incumbent Democrat Sam Ervin chose to retire. The general election was fought between the Democratic nominee Robert Morgan and the Republican nominee William Stevens.

Democratic primary
Party	Candidate	Votes	%
Democratic	Robert Morgan	294,986	50.40
Democratic	Nick Galifianakis	189,815	32.43
Democratic	Henry Wilson	67,247	11.49
Democratic	James Johnson	6,138	1.05
Democratic	Others	27,140	4.64
Turnout		585,326	

Republican primary
Party	Candidate	Votes	%
Republican	William Stevens	62,419	65.12
Republican	Wood Hall Young	26,918	28.08
Republican	B. E. Sweatt	6,520	6.80
Turnout		95,857	

General election
Party	Candidate	Votes	%	±%
Democratic	Robert Morgan	633,647	61.56	+1.00%
Republican	William Stevens	386,720	37.57	−1.87%
Independent		8,974	0.87	N/A
Turnout		1,029,341		
Majority		246,927	23.99	
Democratic hold		Swing		

== North Dakota ==
North Dakota election
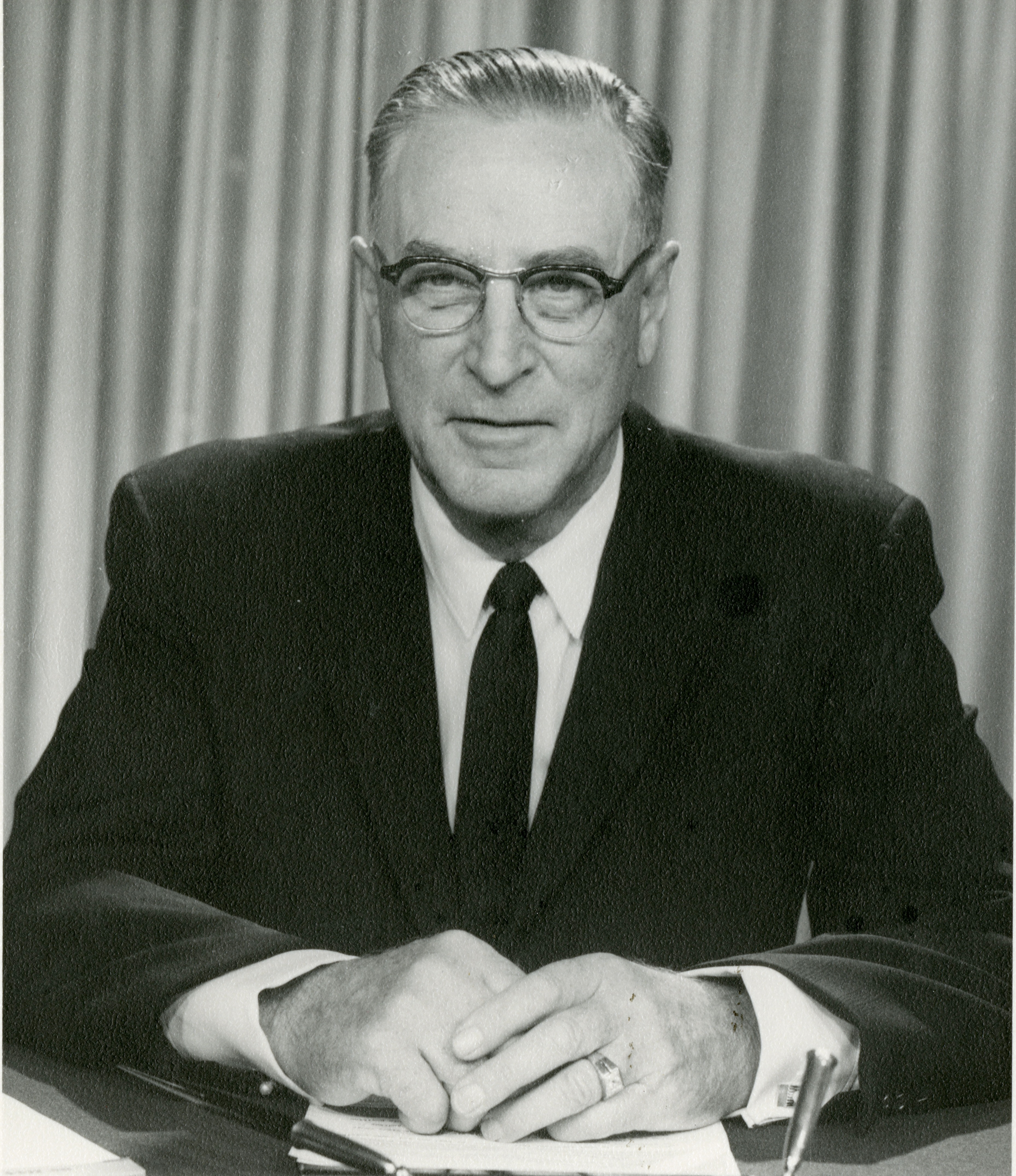

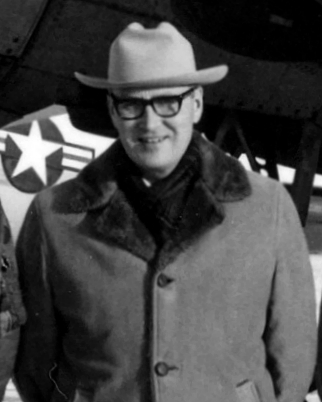
Nominee	Milton R. Young	William L. Guy
Party	Republican	Democratic
Popular vote	114,852	114,675
Percentage	48.45%	48.37%
- County results Young: 40–50% 50–60% 60–70% Guy: 40–50% 50–60% 60–70%
U.S. senator before election
Milton R. Young
Republican
Elected U.S. Senator
Milton R. Young
Republican

Incumbent Republican Milton Young was re-elected to his sixth term, defeating North Dakota Democratic-NPL Party candidate William L. Guy, a former Governor of North Dakota.

Only Young filed as a Republican, and the endorsed Democratic candidate was William L. Guy of Bismarck, North Dakota, who had served as Governor of the state from 1961 to 1973; and had presumably left the office to seek the senate seat. Young and Guy won the primary elections for their respective parties. Guy, who was very popular as governor throughout the state, and Young, who had a high approval rating as senator for the state, created the closest ever election for one of North Dakota's senate seats. Young won the election by only 177 votes, and Guy retired from politics.

Two independent candidates, James R. Jungroth and Kenneth C. Gardner, also filed before the deadline. Jungroth's platform was based on his opposition to strip mining the state's coal reserves. Gardner would later run for the state's other seat in 1988 against then incumbent Quentin Burdick.

1974 United States Senate election in North Dakota
Party	Candidate	Votes	%
Republican	Milton R. Young (Incumbent)	114,852	48.45
Democratic	William L. Guy	114,675	48.37
Independent	James R. Jungroth	6,679	2.82
Independent	Kenneth C. Gardiner	853	0.36
Majority		177	0.07
Turnout		237,059	
Republican hold			

== Ohio ==
Ohio election
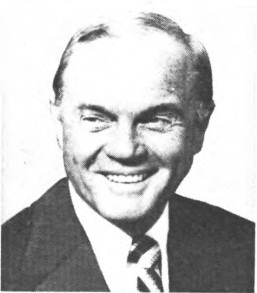

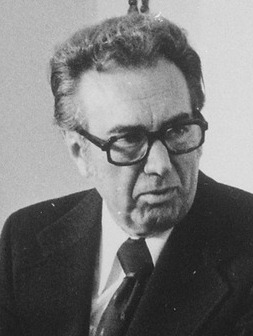
Nominee	John Glenn	Ralph Perk
Party	Democratic	Republican
Popular vote	1,930,670	918,133
Percentage	64.6%	30.7%
- County results Glenn: 50–60% 60–70% 70–80%
U.S. senator before election
Howard Metzenbaum
Democratic
Elected U.S. Senator
John Glenn
Democratic

Incumbent Democrat Howard Metzenbaum was running for election to a full term after he was appointed in 1974 by Ohio governor John J. Gilligan to fill out the Senate term of William B. Saxbe, who had resigned to become United States Attorney General. Metzenbaum lost the primary election to retired astronaut John Glenn, who went on to win the general election and win every county in the state over Republican Ralph Perk, Mayor of Cleveland.

1974 OH United States Senate election
Party	Candidate	Votes	%
Democratic	John Glenn	1,930,670	64.6
Republican	Ralph Perk	918,133	30.7
Independent	Kathleen G. Harroff	76,882	2.6
Independent	Richard B. Kay	61,921	2.1
Independent	John O'Neill	257	0.0
Independent	Ronald E. Girkins	88	0.0
Majority		1,012,357	33.9
Turnout		2,987,606	
Democratic hold			

== Oklahoma ==
Oklahoma election
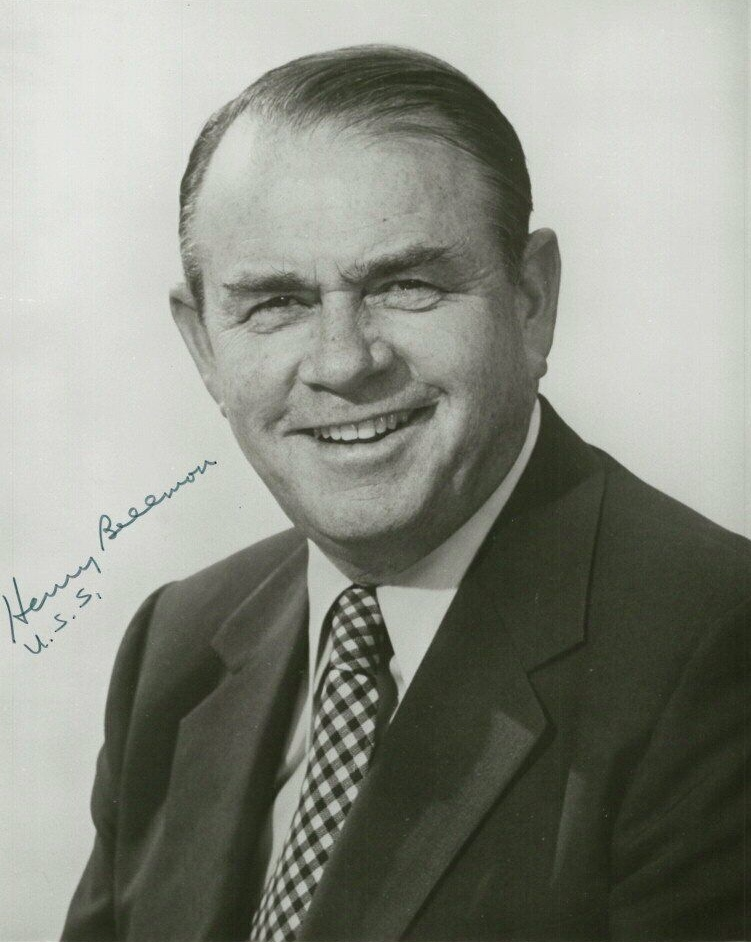

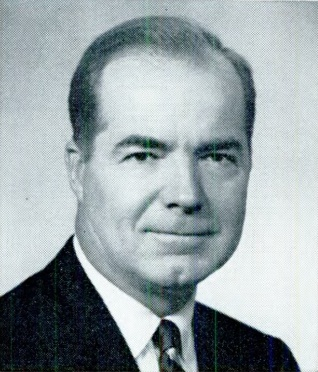
Nominee	Henry Bellmon	Ed Edmondson
Party	Republican	Democratic
Popular vote	390,997	387,162
Percentage	49.4%	48.9%
- County results Bellmon: 40-50% 50-60% 60-70% 70-80% Edmondson: 40–50% 50–60% 60–70% 70–80%
U.S. senator before election
Henry Bellmon
Republican
Elected U.S. Senator
Henry Bellmon
Republican

Incumbent Republican Henry Bellmon narrowly won re-election to a second term, beating Representative Ed Edmondson by nearly 4,000 votes.

General election
Party	Candidate	Votes	%
Republican	Henry Bellmon (Incumbent)	390,997	49.4
Democratic	Ed Edmondson	387,162	48.9
Independent	Paul E. Trent	13,650	1.7
Majority		3,835	0.5
Turnout		791,809	
Republican hold			

== Oregon ==
Oregon election
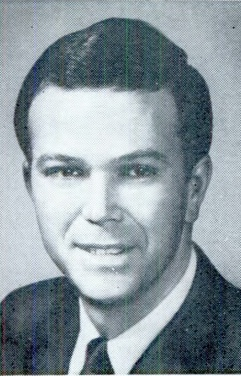

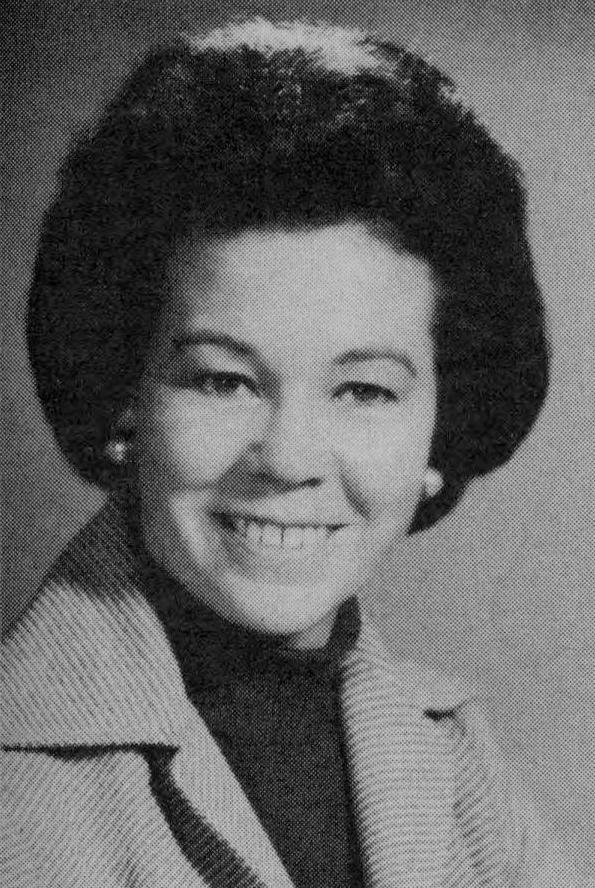
Nominee	Bob Packwood	Betty Roberts
Party	Republican	Democratic
Popular vote	420,964	338,591
Percentage	54.9%	44.2%
- County results Packwood: 50-60% 60-70% Roberts: 50–60%
U.S. senator before election
Bob Packwood
Republican
Elected U.S. Senator
Bob Packwood
Republican

Incumbent Republican Bob Packwood won re-election to a second term. Betty Roberts was chosen to replace former U.S. senator Wayne Morse, who won the Democratic primary but died before the general election.

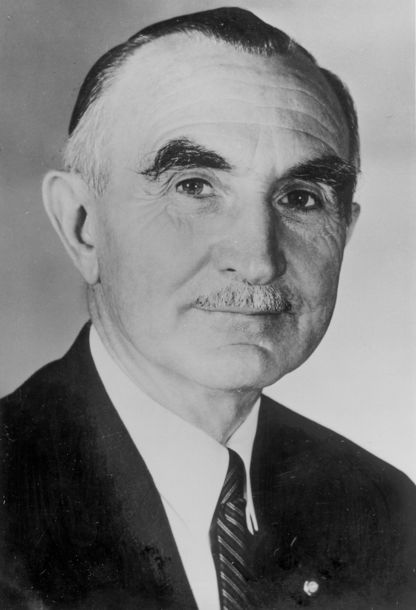
Wayne Morse won the Democratic primary, but died prior to the general election.

The Democratic primaries were held on May 28, 1974. Incumbent senator Bob Packwood was running for re-election after his upset victory against popular incumbent Democrat Wayne Morse in 1968 made him the youngest member of the Senate.

In the Democratic primary, former senator Morse, trying to win back the seat he had for 24 years before losing to Packwood six years earlier, faced Oregon State Senate President Jason Boe and several other candidates for a chance to take back his Senate seat. Boe, who was 45, made Morse's age, 73, an issue in the race while Morse said his experience in the Senate made him a stronger candidate. Boe called for a series of debates around the state, but Morse refused. He went on to defeat Boe 49% to 39%, and planned to use the same strategy in the general election against Packwood, whose narrow victory over Morse 6 years earlier was attributed to Packwood's superior performance at a debate in Portland late in the campaign.

Democratic primary for the United States Senate from Oregon, 1974
Party	Candidate	Votes	%
Democratic	Wayne Morse	155,729	48.98
Democratic	Jason Boe	125,055	39.33
Democratic	Robert T. Daly	21,881	6.88
Democratic	Robert E. O'Connor	14,984	4.71
Democratic	(Scattering)	319	0.10
Total votes		396,204	100.00

In July, Morse was hospitalized in Portland with what was originally described as a serious urinary tract infection. His condition deteriorated and he died on July 22. The death was originally reported to have been caused by kidney failure, but it was later revealed that Morse died of leukemia; Boe apparently knew of the diagnosis during the campaign but did not make it a campaign issue.

The Oregon Democratic State Central Committee met on August 11, two days after Richard Nixon resigned the Presidency. They chose State senator Betty Roberts over Boe to replace Morse as the Democratic nominee. Roberts, an Oregon State Senator, had run for the Democratic nomination for Governor that year, but lost in the May primary to eventual general election winner Robert W. Straub.

Outgoing Oregon governor Tom McCall, who had decided not to run in 1968, had pledged to Packwood a year earlier that he would not challenge him in 1974. But as his term as governor ended, McCall began reconsidering his decision, believing he would bring more integrity to the job. In March 1974, at a dinner party held at Packwood's Washington D.C. home in McCall's honor, McCall informed Packwood that he would challenge him. The news of McCall's change of plans soon reached the media. Eventually, McCall decided that he had little chance against Packwood, who had similar positions to his own and had a reputation for ruthless campaigning that McCall did not share. McCall did not run, and Packwood was unopposed in the Republican primary.

Strong Democratic gains were predicted, giving Roberts a good chance at an upset. In addition, the Senate had no female members and Roberts was one of three women (along with Barbara Mikulski in Maryland and Gwenyfred Bush in South Carolina) seeking a Senate seat. But on the issues, Packwood and Roberts shared many positions, such as on abortion, military spending, and the environment. Moreover, Packwood had distanced himself from Watergate, calling for Nixon's impeachment and denouncing Gerald Ford's pardon of Nixon. Roberts was also at a financial disadvantage, having entered the race late and facing debt from her failed gubernatorial run; Packwood was able to use money he had raised for a primary challenge that never materialized, and led in most polls by a double-digit margin.

Roberts lost the election to Packwood 54% to 44%. Packwood was the only Oregon Republican up for re-election to keep his seat: Democrats won every other available seat. In the Governor's race, Bob Straub, who beat Roberts in the Democratic primary, defeated Vic Atiyeh to become the first elected Democratic governor since 1956; in the U. S. House of Representatives races, Les AuCoin won an open seat in the 1st district and in the 4th district, Jim Weaver upset incumbent John Dellenback.

After the election, Roberts, whose criticism of Packwood's ethics was a theme in her campaign, considered filing a lawsuit against Packwood for misrepresenting her positions on gun control, abortion, and Social Security in campaign advertisements, but later dropped the idea.

1974 United States Senate election in Oregon
Party	Candidate	Votes	%
Republican	Bob Packwood (Incumbent)	420,984	54.93
Democratic	Betty Roberts	338,591	44.18
Write-In	Jason Boe	5,072	0.66
Write-In	Misc.	1,767	0.23
Total votes		766,414	100.00
Republican hold			

== Pennsylvania ==
Pennsylvania election
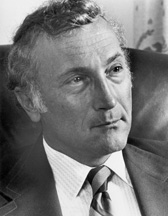

Nominee	Richard Schweiker	Peter Flaherty
Party	Republican	Democratic
Popular vote	1,843,317	1,596,121
Percentage	53.0%	45.9%
- County results Schweiker: 50–60% 60–70% 70–80% Flaherty: 50–60% 60–70%
U.S. senator before election
Richard Schweiker
Republican
Elected U.S. Senator
Richard Schweiker
Republican

Incumbent Republican Richard Schweiker won re-election, defeating Democratic nominee Peter F. Flaherty, Mayor of Pittsburgh.

In the general election campaign, Schweiker faced popular Pittsburgh mayor Peter Flaherty. Both candidates, as highlighted by a New York Times article, "[took] firm stands against inflation, recession, big spending by the Federal Government and abortion on demand." Schweiker, who was endorsed by the AFL–CIO, distanced himself from the Richard Nixon administration, specifically the Watergate scandal, by emphasizing his early calls for Nixon's resignation and the fact that he was on Nixon's "enemies list."

In the end, Schweiker won re-election with 53% of the popular vote, with Flaherty winning 45.9%. Schweiker carried 53 of Pennsylvania's counties, a decrease from the 59 counties he carried in the 1968 election. Flaherty had a strong showing in Allegheny County, which contains his home town of Pittsburgh, which Schweiker had won in 1968. The final election results represented a political divide between the eastern and western portions of the state, Schweiker in the east and Flaherty in the west, with the exception of Flaherty's slim 4,491 vote victory in Philadelphia.

Pennsylvania United States Senate Election, 1974
Party	Candidate	Votes	%
Republican	Richard Schweiker (Incumbent)	1,843,317	53.00
Democratic	Peter F. Flaherty	1,596,121	45.89
Constitution	George W. Shankey	38,004	1.09
Write-in	Other	370	0.01
Majority		247,196	7.11
Turnout		3,477,812	
Republican hold			

== South Carolina ==
South Carolina election
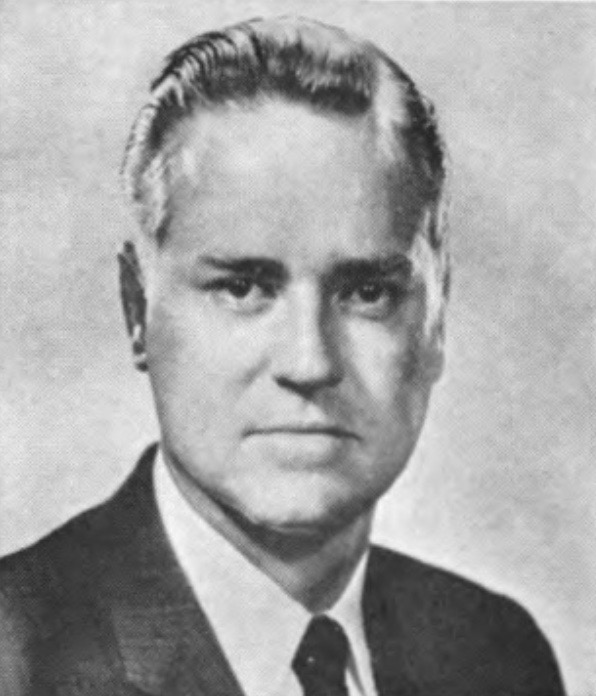

Nominee	Ernest Hollings	Gwen Bush
Party	Democratic	Republican
Popular vote	355,107	146,649
Percentage	69.4%	28.7%
- County results Hollings: 50–60% 60–70% 70–80% 80–90%
U.S. senator before election
Ernest Hollings
Democratic
Elected U.S. Senator
Ernest Hollings
Democratic

The 1974 South Carolina United States Senate election was held on November 5, 1974 to select the U.S. Senator from the state of South Carolina. Incumbent Democratic senator Fritz Hollings easily defeated Republican challenger Gwen Bush to win his third term. Both Hollings and Bush faced no opposition in their party's primaries which allowed both candidates to concentrate solely on the general election. The Watergate scandal caused the Republicans to perform poorly nationwide in 1974 and Gwen Bush was little more than a sacrificial lamb. The main focus of the voters in South Carolina was on the competitive gubernatorial contest and Hollings easily cruised to a comfortable re-election.

South Carolina U.S. Senate Election, 1974
Party	Candidate	Votes	%	±%
Democratic	Fritz Hollings (Incumbent)	355,107	69.4	+7.5%
Republican	Gwen Bush	146,649	28.7	−9.4%
Independent	Harold Hough	9,624	1.9	+1.9%
Majority		208,458	40.7	+16.9%
Turnout		511,380	51.3	−25.2%
Democratic hold				

== South Dakota ==
1974 South Dakota Senate election
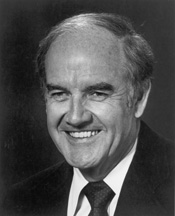

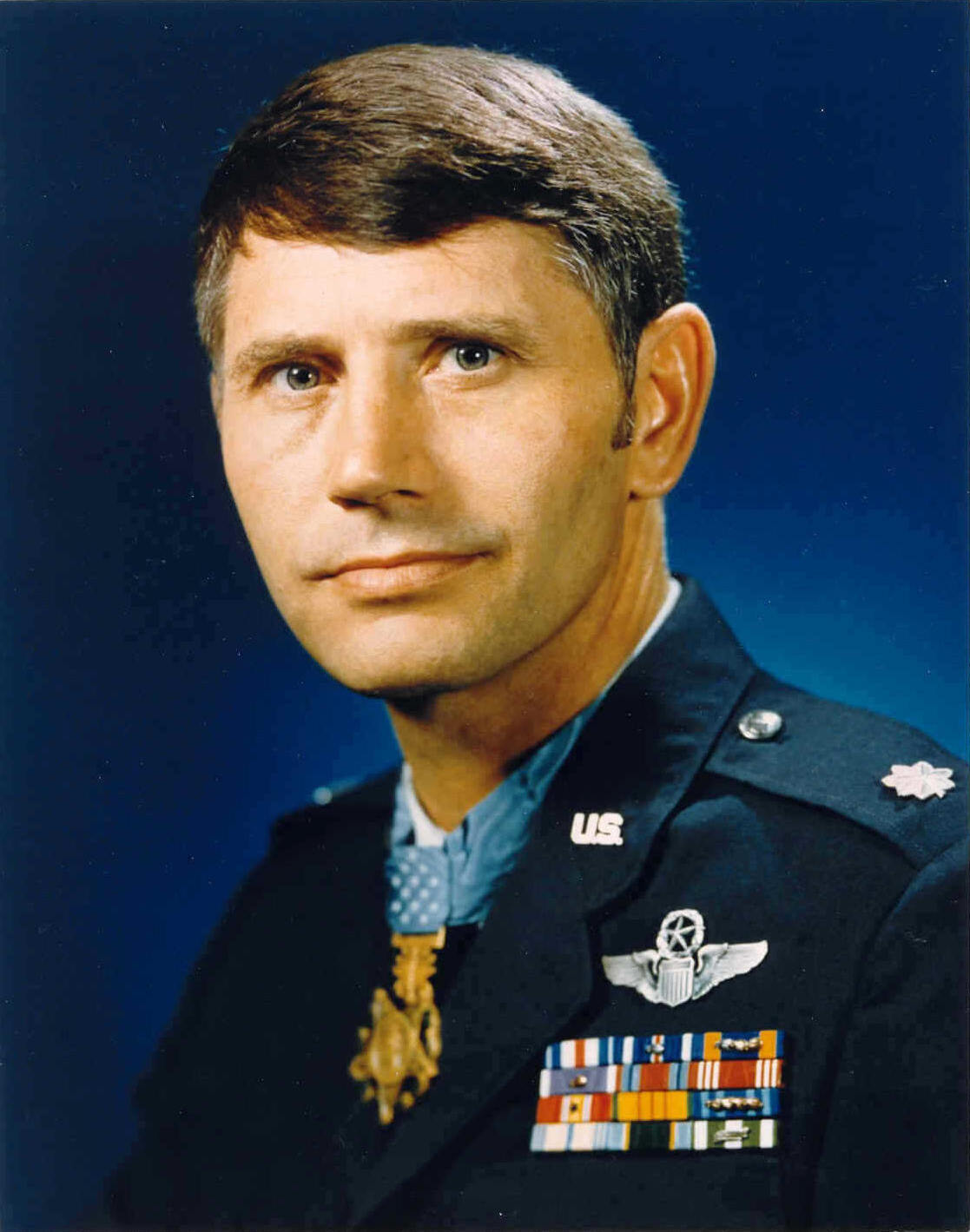
Nominee	George McGovern	Leo K. Thorsness
Party	Democratic	Republican
Popular vote	147,929	130,955
Percentage	53.04%	46.96%
- County results McGovern: 50–60% 60–70% Thorsness: 50–60% 60-70% 70–80%
U.S. senator before election
George McGovern
Democratic
Elected U.S. Senator
George McGovern
Democratic

1974 United States Senate election in South Dakota Results
Party	Candidate	Votes	%
Democratic	George McGovern (Incumbent)	147,929	53.04
Republican	Leo K. Thorsness	130,955	46.96
Majority		16,974	6.08
Turnout		278,884	
Democratic hold			

== Utah ==
Utah election
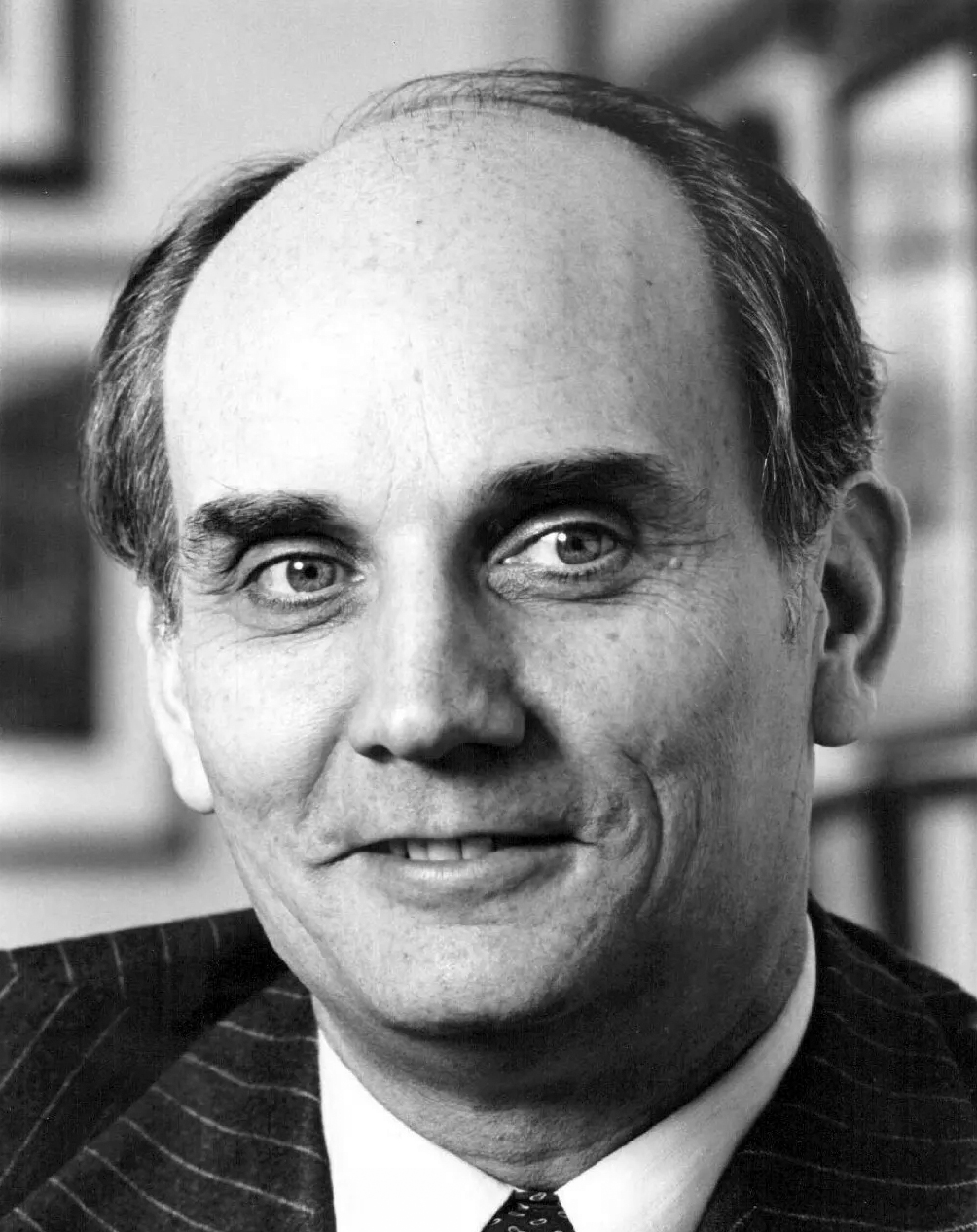

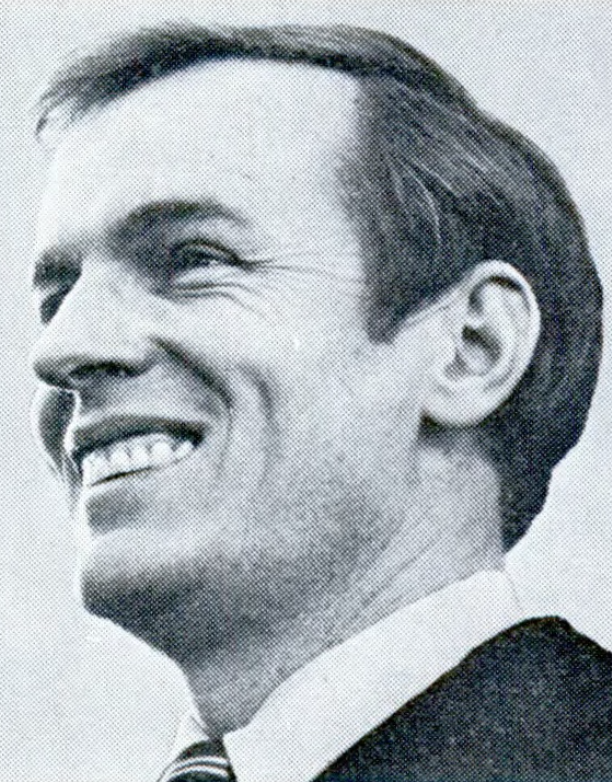

Nominee	Jake Garn	Wayne Owens	Bruce Bangerter
Party	Republican	Democratic	American
Popular vote	210,299	185,377	24,966
Percentage	49.99%	44.07%	5.94%
- County results Garn: 40–50% 50–60% 60–70% Owens: 40–50% 50–60% 70–80%
U.S. senator before election
Wallace F. Bennett
Republican
Elected U.S. Senator
Jake Garn
Republican

Incumbent Republican U.S. Senator Wallace F. Bennett did not run for re-election to a fifth term, but retired. Salt Lake City mayor Jake Garn won the Republican nomination, while U.S. representative Wayne Owens won the Democratic nomination. Garn defeated Owens, 50% to 44%, with third-party candidate Bruce Bangerter winning 6% of the vote.

1974 United States Senate election in Utah Results
Party	Candidate	Votes	%
Republican	Jake Garn	210,299	49.99
Democratic	Wayne Owens	185,377	44.07
American	Bruce Bangerter	24,966	5.94
Majority		24,922	5.92
Turnout		420,642	
Republican hold			

== Vermont ==
Vermont election
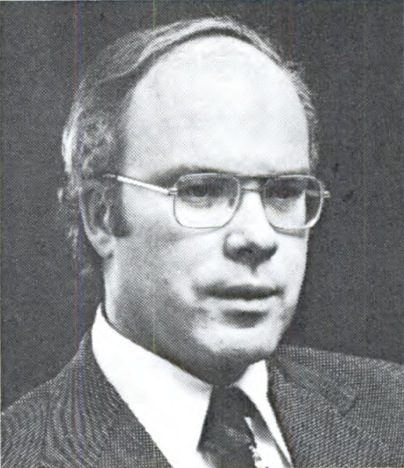

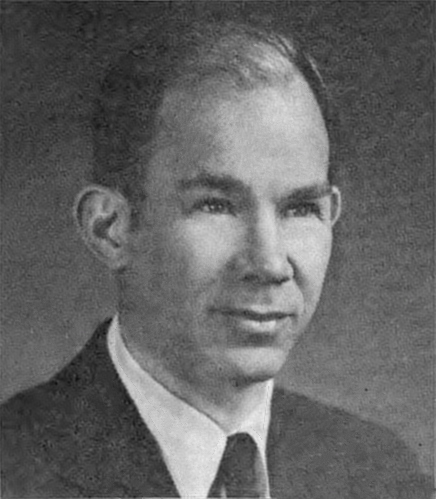
Nominee	Patrick Leahy	Richard W. Mallary
Party	Democratic	Republican
Popular vote	70,629	66,223
Percentage	49.5%	46.4%
- Leahy: 40-50% 50-60% 60-70% 70-80% Mallary: 40-50% 50-60% 60-70% 70-80% 80-90%
U.S. senator before election
George Aiken
Republican
Elected U.S. Senator
Patrick Leahy
Democratic

Incumbent Republican George Aiken did not run for re-election to another term in the United States Senate. Democratic candidate, attorney and prosecutor Patrick Leahy defeated the Republican candidate, congressman Richard W. Mallary to succeed him. Leahy was the first Democrat ever elected to the senate from Vermont.

Republican primary election
Party	Candidate	Votes	%
Republican	Richard W. Mallary	27,221	59.1
Republican	Charles R. Ross	16,479	35.8
Republican	T. Serse Ambrosini	2,265	4.9
Republican	Other	61	0.1
Total votes		46,026	100.0

Democratic primary election
Party	Candidate	Votes	%
Democratic	Patrick Leahy	19,801	83.9
Democratic	Nathaniel Frothingham	3,703	15.7
Democratic	Other	97	0.4
Total votes		23,601	100.0

1974 United States Senate election in Vermont
Party	Candidate	Votes	%
Democratic	Patrick Leahy	70,629	49.47
Republican	Richard W. Mallary	66,223	46.38
Liberty Union	Bernie Sanders	5,901	4.13
Write-in	Other	19	0.0
Total votes		142,772	100.0
Majority		4,406	3.09
Democratic gain from Republican		Swing	

== Washington ==
Washington Election
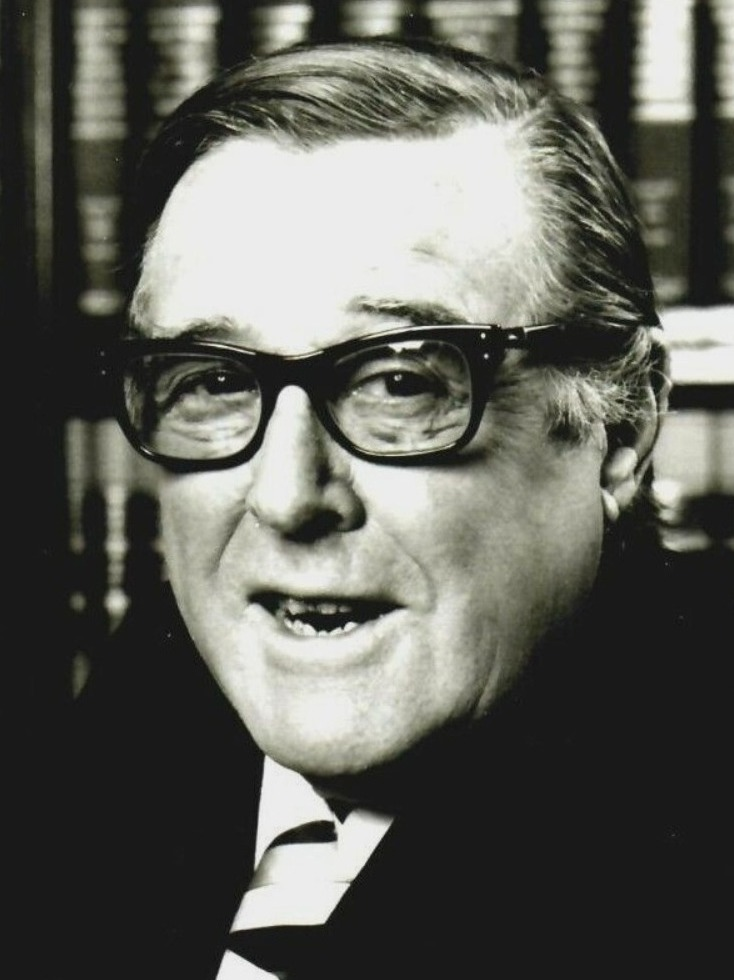

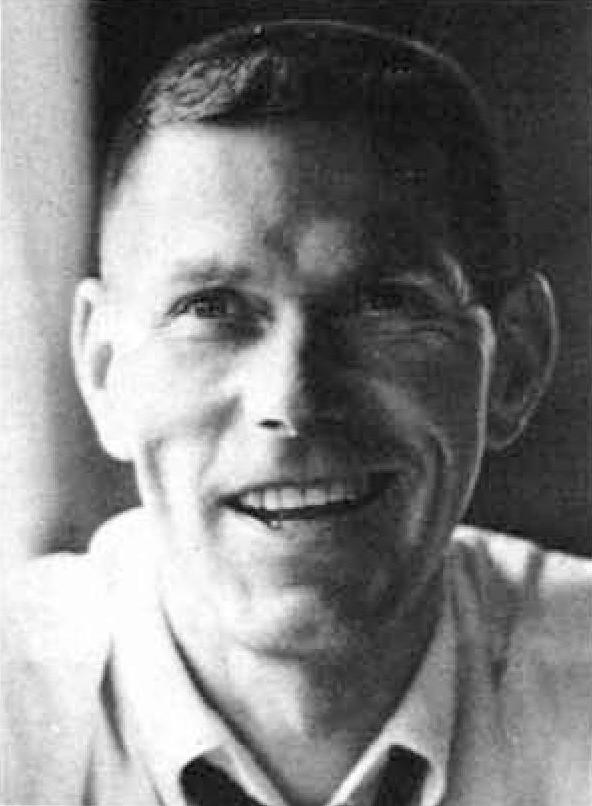
Nominee	Warren Magnuson	Jack Metcalf
Party	Democratic	Republican
Popular vote	611,811	363,626
Percentage	60.70%	36.08%
- County results Magnuson: 40–50% 50–60% 60–70% 70–80% Metcalf: 40–50% 50–60%
U.S. senator before election
Warren G. Magnuson
Democratic
Elected U.S. Senator
Warren G. Magnuson
Democratic

1974 United States Senate election in Washington Results
Party	Candidate	Votes	%
Democratic	Warren Magnuson (Incumbent)	611,811	60.70
Republican	Jack Metcalf	363,626	36.08
American Independent	Gene Goosman	19,871	1.97
Socialist Workers	Clare Fraenzl	8,176	0.81
U.S. Labor	Pat Ruckert	4,363	0.43
Majority		248,185	24.62
Turnout		1,007,847	
Democratic hold			

== Wisconsin ==
Wisconsin election
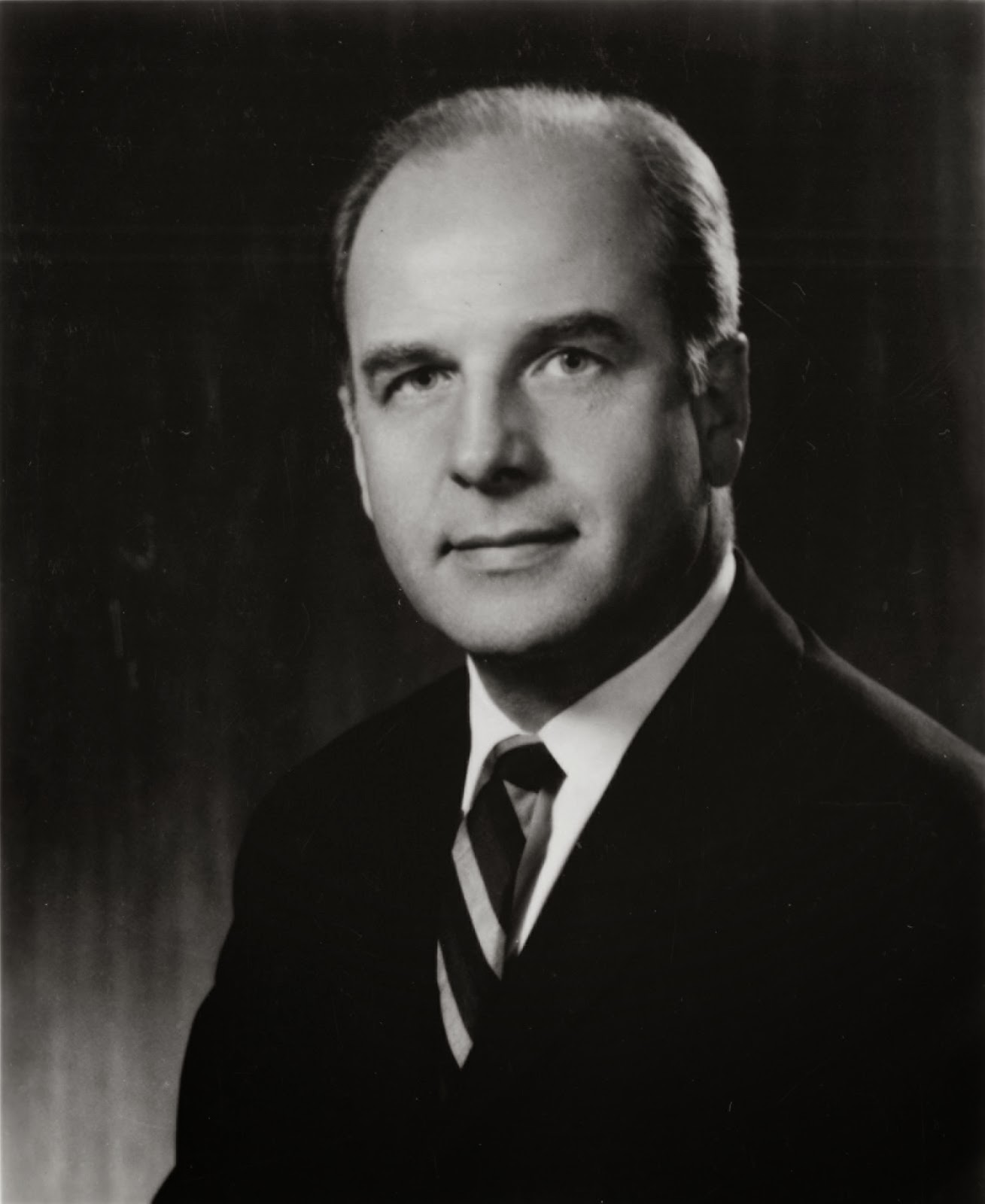

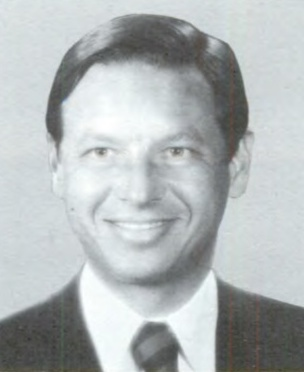
Nominee	Gaylord Nelson	Tom Petri
Party	Democratic	Republican
Popular vote	740,700	429,327
Percentage	61.8%	35.8%
- County results Nelson: 50–60% 60–70% 70–80% 80–90% Petri: 50–60% 60–70%
U.S. senator before election
Gaylord Nelson
Democratic
Elected U.S. Senator
Gaylord Nelson
Democratic

Incumbent Democrat Gaylord Nelson won re-election to a third term over Tom Petri, State senator since 1973.

General election
Party	Candidate	Votes	%
Democratic	Gaylord Nelson (Incumbent)	740,700	61.8
Republican	Tom Petri	429,327	35.8
American	Gerald L. McFarren	24,003	2.0
Lowering the Property Tax	Roman Blenski	5,396	0.6
Write-in	Write-Ins	69	0.0
Majority		311,373	26.0
Turnout		1,199,426	
Democratic hold			

== See also ==
- 1974 United States elections
  - 1974 United States gubernatorial elections
  - 1974 United States House of Representatives elections
- 93rd United States Congress
- 94th United States Congress
- Watergate Babies
- Watergate scandal
