= List of elections in 1974 =

The following elections occurred in the year 1974.

== Africa ==
- 1974 Botswana general election
- 1974 Guinean general election
- 1974 Kenyan general election
- 1974 Malian constitutional referendum
- 1974 Rhodesian general election
- 1974 Seychellois parliamentary election
- 1974 South African general election
- 1974 South West African legislative election
- 1974 Tunisian general election

== Asia ==
- 1974 Bangladeshi presidential election
- 1974 Burmese general election
- 1974 Japanese House of Councillors election
- 1974 Maldivian parliamentary election
- 1974 Sikkimese general election
- 1974 Singaporean presidential election
- 1974 Soviet Union legislative election

=== India ===
- 1974 Indian presidential election
- 1974 Indian vice presidential election

=== Malaysia ===
- 1974 Malaysian general election
- 1974 Malaysian state elections
- 1974 Sarawak state election

== Europe ==
- 1974 Albanian parliamentary election
- 1974 Austrian presidential election
- 1974 Belgian general election
- 1974 Danish local elections
- 1974 Faroese general election
- 1974 Greek legislative election
- 1974 Greek presidential election
- 1974 Icelandic parliamentary election
- 1974 Irish local elections
- 1974 Irish presidential election
- 1974 Italian divorce referendum
- 1974 Liechtenstein general election
- 1974 Luxembourg general election
- 1974 Romanian presidential election
- 1974 San Marino general election
- 1974 Swiss referendum
- 1974 Soviet Union legislative election
- 1974 West German presidential election
- 1974 Yugoslavian parliamentary election

=== France ===
- 1974 French presidential election

=== United Kingdom ===
- February 1974 United Kingdom general election
  - England: February 1974 United Kingdom general election in England
  - Scotland: February 1974 United Kingdom general election in Scotland
  - Wales: February 1974 United Kingdom general election in Wales
  - Northern Ireland: February 1974 United Kingdom general election in Northern Ireland
  - List of MPs elected in the February 1974 United Kingdom general election
- October 1974 United Kingdom general election
  - England: October 1974 United Kingdom general election in England
  - Scotland: October 1974 United Kingdom general election in Scotland
  - Wales: October 1974 United Kingdom general election in Wales
  - Northern Ireland: October 1974 United Kingdom general election in Northern Ireland
  - List of MPs elected in the October 1974 United Kingdom general election
- 1974 Newham South by-election

==== United Kingdom local ====
- 1974 United Kingdom local elections

===== English local =====
- 1974 Lambeth Council election
- 1974 Lewisham Council election
- 1974 Newham Council election
- 1974 Southwark Council election

== North America ==
- 1974 Belizean legislative election
- 1974 Costa Rican general election
- 1974 Dominican Republic general election
- 1974 Guatemalan general election
- 1974 Nicaraguan general election
- 1974 Salvadoran legislative election

=== Canada ===
- 1974 Canadian federal election
- 1974 Brantford municipal election
- 1974 Edmonton municipal election
- 1974 New Brunswick general election
- 1974 Nova Scotia general election
- 1974 Ottawa municipal election
- 1974 Prince Edward Island general election
- 1974 Toronto municipal election
- 1974 Winnipeg municipal election
- 1974 Yukon general election

=== United States ===
- 1974 New York state election
- 1974 United States elections

==== United States lieutenant gubernatorial ====
- 1974 Alabama lieutenant gubernatorial election
- 1974 California lieutenant gubernatorial election
- 1974 Georgia lieutenant gubernatorial election
- 1974 Ohio lieutenant gubernatorial election
- 1974 Texas lieutenant gubernatorial election

==== United States gubernatorial ====
- 1974 Alabama gubernatorial election
- 1974 Alaska gubernatorial election
- 1974 Arizona gubernatorial election
- 1974 Arkansas gubernatorial election
- 1974 California gubernatorial election
- 1974 Colorado gubernatorial election
- 1974 Connecticut gubernatorial election
- 1974 Florida gubernatorial election
- 1974 Georgia gubernatorial election
- 1974 Hawaii gubernatorial election
- 1974 Idaho gubernatorial election
- 1974 Iowa gubernatorial election
- 1974 Kansas gubernatorial election
- 1974 Maine gubernatorial election
- 1974 Maryland gubernatorial election
- 1974 Massachusetts gubernatorial election
- 1974 Michigan gubernatorial election
- 1974 Minnesota gubernatorial election
- 1974 Nebraska gubernatorial election
- 1974 Nevada gubernatorial election
- 1974 New Hampshire gubernatorial election
- 1974 New York gubernatorial election
- 1974 Ohio gubernatorial election
- 1974 Oklahoma gubernatorial election
- 1974 Oregon gubernatorial election
- 1974 Pennsylvania gubernatorial election
- 1974 Rhode Island gubernatorial election
- 1974 South Carolina gubernatorial election
- 1974 South Dakota gubernatorial election
- 1974 Tennessee gubernatorial election
- 1974 Texas gubernatorial election
- 1974 United States gubernatorial elections
- 1974 Vermont gubernatorial election
- 1974 Wisconsin gubernatorial election
- 1974 Wyoming gubernatorial election

==== United States House of Representatives ====
- 1974 United States House of Representatives elections
- 1974 United States House of Representatives election in Alaska
- 1974 United States House of Representatives election in Delaware
- 1974 Georgia's 6th congressional district election
- United States House of Representatives elections in California, 1974
- 1974 United States House of Representatives election in Nevada
- 1974 United States House of Representatives election in North Dakota
- United States House of Representatives elections in South Carolina, 1974
- 1974 United States House of Representatives election in Vermont
- 1974 United States House of Representatives election in Wyoming

==== United States Senate ====
- 1974 United States Senate elections
- 1974 United States Senate election in Alabama
- 1974 United States Senate election in Alaska
- 1974 United States Senate election in Arizona
- 1974 United States Senate election in Arkansas
- 1974 United States Senate election in California
- 1974 United States Senate election in Colorado
- 1974 United States Senate election in Connecticut
- 1974 United States Senate election in Florida
- 1974 United States Senate election in Georgia
- 1974 United States Senate election in Hawaii
- 1974 United States Senate election in Idaho
- 1974 United States Senate election in Illinois
- 1974 United States Senate election in Indiana
- 1974 United States Senate election in Iowa
- 1974 United States Senate election in Kansas
- 1974 United States Senate election in Kentucky
- 1974 United States Senate election in Louisiana
- 1974 United States Senate election in Maryland
- 1974 United States Senate election in Missouri
- 1974 United States Senate election in Nevada
- 1974 United States Senate election in New Hampshire
- 1974 United States Senate election in New York
- 1974 United States Senate election in North Carolina
- 1974 United States Senate election in North Dakota
- 1974 United States Senate election in Ohio
- 1974 United States Senate election in Oklahoma
- 1974 United States Senate election in Oregon
- 1974 United States Senate election in Pennsylvania
- 1974 United States Senate election in South Carolina
- 1974 United States Senate election in South Dakota
- 1974 United States Senate election in Utah
- 1974 United States Senate election in Vermont
- 1974 United States Senate election in Wisconsin

==== United States mayoral elections ====
- 1974 San Jose mayoral election
- 1974 Sioux Falls mayoral election
- 1974 Tampa mayoral special election
- 1974 Washington, D.C., mayoral election

== South America ==
=== Brazil ===
- 1974 Brazilian legislative election
- 1974 Brazilian presidential election

=== Colombia ===
- 1974 Colombian general election

== Oceania ==
- 1974 Cook Islands general election
- 1974 Gilbert and Ellice Islands general election
- 1974 Niuean constitutional referendum
- 1974 Trust Territory of the Pacific Islands Constitutional Convention election
- 1974 Trust Territory of the Pacific Islands parliamentary election

=== Australia ===
- 1974 Australian federal election
- 1974 Coogee state by-election
- 1974 Goulburn state by-election
- 1974 Goyder state by-election
- 1974 Northern Territory general election
- 1974 Australian referendum
- 1974 Queensland state election
- 1974 Western Australian state election
