= Red hand =

Red hand may refer to:

== People ==
- Owain Lawgoch (Eng translation: Owain of the Red Hand), the title given to Owain ap Thomas ap Rhodri, a Welsh soldier who led a Free Company fighting for the French against the English in the Hundred Years' War and a claimant to the title of Prince of Gwynedd and of Wales

== Arts, entertainment, and media ==
- Red Hand, a rebel group in the American television series Colony
- Band of the Red Hand, a fictional military group from The Wheel of Time series
- "Red Hand Case", a song by band Modest Mouse
- Red Hand of Doom, a Dungeons and Dragons game
- "Red Right Hand", a song by Nick Cave and the Bad Seeds
- The Red Hand Gang, a television show

== Organizations ==
- La Main Rouge (English translation: The Red Hand), an armed group operating in French North Africa in the 1950s
- Red Hand Commando, a small Ulster loyalist paramilitary group in Northern Ireland, which is closely linked to the Ulster Volunteer Force (UVF)
- Red Hand Defenders (RHD), an Ulster loyalist paramilitary group in Northern Ireland

== Other uses ==
- Red Hand Day or International Day against the Use of Child Soldiers, February 12 each year, is an annual commemoration day on which pleas are made to political leaders and events are staged around the world to draw attention to the fates of child soldiers
- Red Hand of Ulster, an Irish symbol used in heraldry to denote the Irish province of Ulster

== See also ==
- Black Hand (disambiguation)
- Red hands
- Red-handed (disambiguation)
- White hand (disambiguation)
