= Ribicoff =

Ribicoff is a surname. Notable people with the surname include:

- Abraham Ribicoff (1910–1998), American politician
- Casey Ribicoff (1922–2011), American philanthropist and socialite, wife of the above
