= October 1974 United Kingdom general election in England =

- 10 October 1974

All 516 English seats in the House of Commons
- Turnout: 72.6% (▼6.4 pp)
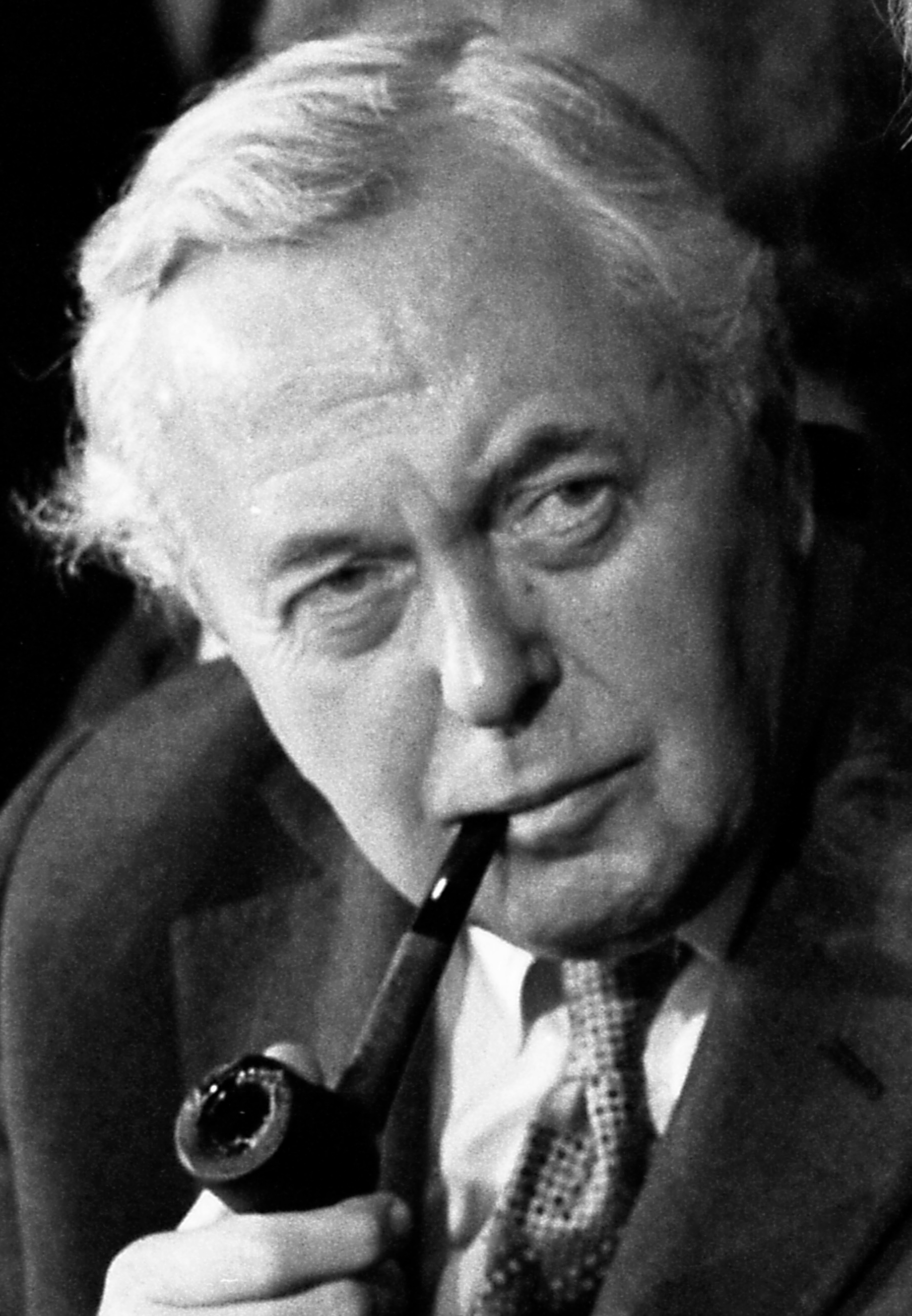

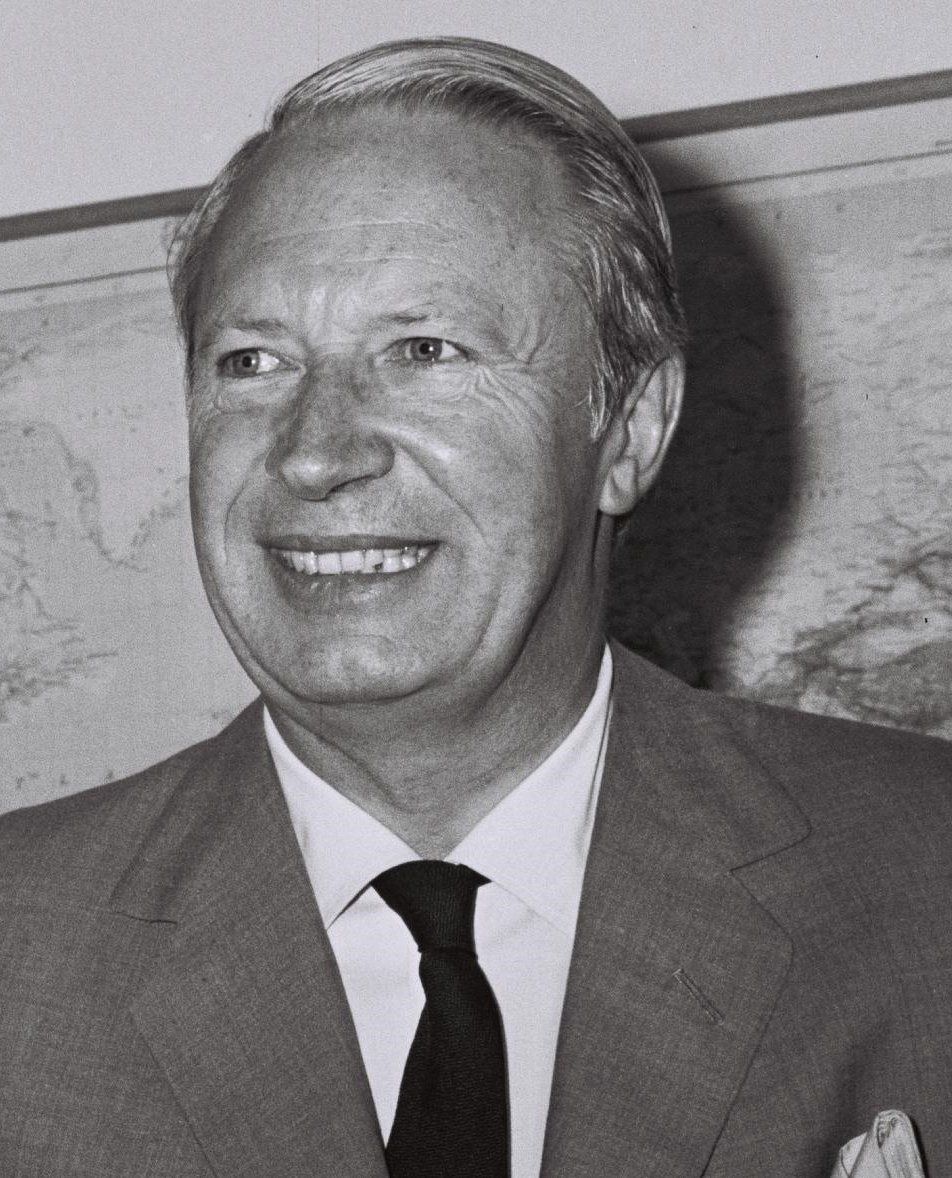
	First party	Second party	Third party
			Lib
Leader	Harold Wilson	Edward Heath	Jeremy Thorpe
Party	Labour	Conservative	Liberal
Leader since	14 February 1963	28 July 1965	18 January 1967
Leader's seat	Huyton	Sidcup	North Devon
Last election	237 seats, 37.7%	268 seats, 40.2%	9 seats, 21.3%
Seats won	255	253 (Note: Figure includes Speaker of the House of Commons Selwyn Lloyd in Wirral.)	8
Seat change	▲18	▼15	▼1
Popular vote	9,695,051	9,414,008	4,878,792
Percentage	40.1%	38.9%	20.2%
Swing	▲2.4 pp	▼1.3 pp	▼1.1 pp

On Thursday 10 October 1974, the October 1974 United Kingdom general election was held in England, to elect all 635 members of the House of Commons, with 516 constituencies being in England.

It was the second general election held that year. This election was held just seven months after the previous general election, held in February 1974, had led to a hung parliament. Following the inconclusive nature of coalition talks between the Conservatives and other parties such as the Liberals and the disaffiliated Ulster Unionists, the Labour Leader Harold Wilson had gone on to form a minority government. After 8 months, Wilson felt he had demonstrated enough progress to win a majority, and called a second election. It was also the first year in which two general elections had been held in the same year since 1910; and the first time that two general elections had been held less than a year apart from each other since the 1923 and 1924 elections, which took place 10 months apart.

Across the United Kingdom, the election resulted in a narrow victory for the Labour Party, led by Prime Minister Harold Wilson, which won a wafer-thin majority of three seats, the narrowest in modern British history.

== Candidates ==
Below is a table summarising the candidates of the February 1974 general election in England.

Affiliation	Candidates
Labour Party	516
Conservative and Unionist Party	515
Liberal Party	515
National Front	89
Campaign for a More Prosperous Britain	24
Communist Party of Great Britain	17
Independent	17
United Democratic Party	13
Workers Revolutionary Party	9
Other	51
Total	1,766

== Analysis ==
=== Conservatives and Labour ===
While the Labour Party led by Prime Minister Harold Wilson clinched an overall narrow majority of 3 seats in the House of Commons, the Labour Party won just two seats over the opposition Conservative Party led by Edward Heath in England. Overall, although Labour gained 18 seats, the party, fell short of winning a majority of seats in England by four seats. Between the Conservative Party and Labour, Labour won Birmingham Selly Oak, Bolton West, Bristol North West, Bury and Radcliffe, Hemel Hempstead, Ilford North, Ipswich, Leicester South, Lichfield and Tamworth, Nelson and Colne, Oxford, Peterborough, Rochester and Chatham, Rossendale, Southampton Test and Welwyn Hatfield.

Amongst the two candidates who were not party of major parties, the election saw each lose their seats. Independent Labour Member of Parliament (and former Labour MP) Eddie Milne lost the seat of Blyth Valley. Similarly, in Lincoln, former Labour MP and leader of the Democratic Labour Party Dick Taverne lost his seat also to the Labour Party.

As a result of these seat changes amongst the major parties, the Conservative Party lost a total of 15 seats, with the Labour gaining a total of 18 without any losses. Notable figures who entered Parliament in English seats included Margaret Beckett in Lincoln and Bryan Gould in Southampton Test for the Labour party.

This remains the last general election in which a party won an overall majority in the Commons without winning a majority of seats in England. Since this election, the Labour Party has only won more seats in England on four other occasions following this election: 1997, 2001, 2005 and 2024.

=== Liberal Party ===
The Liberal Party, which had seen a large resurgence in the England, as well as in the rest of the United Kingdom, also sa some changes. It won Truro from the Conservatives, however lost Bodmin and Hazel Grove to the Conservative Party as well.

The party otherwise held North Cornwall, with Leader of the Liberal Party Jeremy Thorpe retaining North Devon, Isle of Wight and Berwick-upon-Tweed, Isle of Ely, Colne Valley and Rochdale. The Liberals therefore decreased by only one seat in England.

== Results ==
Party	Seats					Aggregate votes		
Party	Total	Gains	Losses	Net	Of all (%)	Total	Of all (%)	Change (%)
Labour	255	18	0	▲18	49.4	9,695,051	40.1	▲2.4
Conservative	253	2	17	▼15	49.0	9,414,008	38.9	▼1.3
Liberal	8	1	2	▼1	1.6	4,878,792	20.2	▼1.1
National Front	0	0	0	Steady	—	113,757	0.5	▲0.2
Independent Labour	0	0	1	▼1	—	30,578	0.1	Steady
Democratic Labour	0	0	1	▼1	—	13,714	0.1	Steady
Communist	0	0	0	Steady	—	7,032	0.0	▼0.1
Independent	0	0	0	Steady	—	6,227	0.0	▼0.1
United Democratic	0	New			—	4,810	0.0	New
More Prosperous Britain	0	0	0	Steady	—	4,407	0.0	Steady
Workers Revolutionary	0	0	0	Steady	—	2,977	0.0	Steady
Ind. Conservative	0	0	0	Steady	—	2,646	0.0	Steady
Independent Liberal	0	0	0	Steady	—	2,558	0.0	▼0.1
Irish Civil Rights	0	New			—	2,381	0.0	New
PEOPLE	0	0	0	Steady	—	1,996	0.0	Steady
Ind. Labour Party	0	0	0	Steady	—	1,335	0.0	Steady
Marxist–Leninist (England)	0	New			—	1,245	0.0	New
United English National	0	New			—	793	0.0	New
English National	0	0	0	Steady	—	723	0.0	Steady
Whig	0	New			—	719	0.0	New
Labour and Democrat	0	0	0	Steady	—	558	0.0	Steady
Independent English Nationalist	0	New			—	547	0.0	New
World Middle Classes Party	0	New			—	457	0.0	New
Independent British Nationalist	0	New			—	451	0.0	New
The Christian Party	0	New			—	408	0.0	New
Mebyon Kernow	0	0	0	Steady	—	384	0.0	Steady
Go To Blazes Party	0	New			—	351	0.0	New
Women's Rights	0	New			—	298	0.0	New
Anti-EEC	0	0	0	Steady	—	287	0.0	Steady
People Power	0	New			—	266	0.0	New
UK Front	0	0	0	Steady	—	256	0.0	Steady
Gay Liberal	0	New			—	223	0.0	New
Labour Conservative Coalition	0	New			—	192	0.0	New
Protest Party	0	New			—	171	0.0	New
Anti-Party System	0	New			—	148	0.0	New
Social Credit	0	0	0	Steady	—	137	0.0	Steady
Socialist (GB)	0	Did not stand in Feb. 1974			—	118	0.0	—N/a
Air Road Public Safety	0	New			—	68	0.0	New
Blank and invalid votes						25,129	—	—
Total	516			0	100.0	24,191,069 (Note: All valid votes excluding spoiled votes.)	100.0	0.0
Registered voters, and turnout						33,341,371	72.6	▼6.4

Popular vote
Labour	40.1%
Conservative	38.9%
Liberal	20.2%
Other	0.8%

Parliament Seats
Labour	49.4%
Conservative	49.0%
Liberal	1.6%

== By region ==
Note: the following tables indicate the results according to the regions of England which were established in 1994. These regions were not used at the time for the purposes of this election.

=== East Midlands ===
Party	Seats					Aggregate votes		
Party	Total	Gains	Losses	Net	Of all (%)	Total	Of all (%)	Change (%)
Labour	21	2	0	▲2	53.8	—N/a	42.2	▲1.5
Conservative	18	0	1	▼1	46.2	—N/a	38.5	▼2.3
Liberal	0	0	0	Steady	0.0	—N/a	18.0	▼1.2
Others	0	0	1 (Note: This seat was held by Dick Taverne for the Democratic Labour Party in Lincoln.)	▼1	0.0	—N/a	1.4	▼0.4
Total	39					—N/a		

=== East of England ===
Party	Seats					Aggregate votes		
Party	Total	Gains	Losses	Net	Of all (%)	Total	Of all (%)	Change (%)
Conservative	31	0	4	▼4	68.9	—N/a	51.5	▲0.9
Labour	13	4	0	▲4	28.9	—N/a	31.9	▲3.1
Liberal	1	0	0	Steady	2.2	—N/a	15.8	▼3.9
Others	0	0	0	Steady	0.0	—N/a	0.2	Steady
Total	45					—N/a		

=== Greater London ===
Party	Seats					Aggregate votes		
Party	Total	Gains	Losses	Net	Of all (%)	Total	Of all (%)	Change (%)
Labour	51	1	0	▲1	55.4	—N/a	39.6	▲3.4
Conservative	41	0	1	▼1	44.6	—N/a	46.0	▼0.2
Liberal	0	0	0	Steady	0.0	—N/a	17.0	▼3.7
Others	0	0	0	Steady	0.0	—N/a	1.8	▲0.6
Total	92					—N/a		

Greater London

=== North East England ===
Party	Seats					Aggregate votes		
Party	Total	Gains	Losses	Net	Of all (%)	Total	Of all (%)	Change (%)
Labour	26	1	0	▲1	83.9	—N/a	53.9	▲1.5
Conservative	4	0	0	Steady	12.9	—N/a	28.1	▼5.3
Liberal	1	0	0	Steady	3.2	—N/a	16.4	▲4.0
Others	0	0	1 (Note: This seat was held by Eddie Milne as an independent in Blyth Valley.)	▼1	0.0	—N/a	1.6	▼0.2
Total	31					—N/a		

=== North West England ===
Party	Seats					Aggregate votes		
Party	Total	Gains	Losses	Net	Of all (%)	Total	Of all (%)	Change (%)
Labour	55	4	0	▲4	67.1	—N/a	44.5	▲3.0
Conservative	26	0	3	▼3	31.7	—N/a	37.2	▼1.3
Liberal	1	0	1	▼1	1.2	—N/a	17.9	▼1.4
Others	0	0	0	Steady	0.0	—N/a	0.4	▼0.3
Total	82					—N/a		

=== South East England ===
Party	Seats					Aggregate votes		
Party	Total	Gains	Losses	Net	Of all (%)	Total	Of all (%)	Change (%)
Conservative	61	0	3	▼3	87.1	—N/a	46.7	▼0.1
Labour	8	3	0	▲3	11.4	—N/a	28.5	▲3.3
Liberal	1	0	0	Steady	1.4	—N/a	24.3	▼3.2
Others	0	0	0	Steady	0.0	—N/a	0.6	▲0.2
Total	70					—N/a		

=== South West England ===
Party	Seats					Aggregate votes		
Party	Total	Gains	Losses	Net	Of all (%)	Total	Of all (%)	Change (%)
Conservative	35	1	0	▼1	76.1	—N/a	43.6	▼0.2
Labour	8	0	1	▲1	17.4	—N/a	28.7	▲2.3
Liberal	3	0	0	Steady	6.5	—N/a	27.3	▼2.2
Others	0	0	0	Steady	0.0	—N/a	0.4	Steady
Total	46					—N/a		

=== West Midlands ===
Party	Seats					Aggregate votes		
Party	Total	Gains	Losses	Net	Of all (%)	Total	Of all (%)	Change (%)
Labour	35	2	0	▲2	62.5	—N/a	43.9	▲0.8
Conservative	21	0	2	▼2	37.5	—N/a	37.5	▼3.3
Liberal	0	0	0	Steady	0.0	—N/a	17.8	▲2.9
Others	0	0	0	Steady	0.0	—N/a	0.8	▼0.3
Total	56					—N/a		

=== Yorkshire and the Humber ===
Party	Seats					Aggregate votes		
Party	Total	Gains	Losses	Net	Of all (%)	Total	Of all (%)	Change (%)
Labour	38	0	0	Steady	69.1	—N/a	46.4	▲1.7
Conservative	16	0	0	Steady	29.1	—N/a	32.6	▼2.6
Liberal	1	0	0	Steady	1.8	—N/a	20.2	▲0.7
Others	0	0	0	Steady	0.0	—N/a	0.8	▲0.2
Total	55					—N/a		

== See also ==
- October 1974 United Kingdom general election in Northern Ireland
- October 1974 United Kingdom general election in Scotland
- October 1974 United Kingdom general election in Wales
