= Gail Rubin =

American photographer (1938–1978)

- Born: April 12, 1938
- Died: March 11, 1978 (aged 39); Maagan Michael, Israel
- Occupation: Photographer
- Notable work: Psalmist With a Camera: Photographs of a Biblical Safari (1979)
- Parents: Jonathan Rubin (father); Estelle Rubin (mother)

Gail Rubin (April 12, 1938 – March 11, 1978) was an American freelance photographer. During her career, she worked as both a war photographer and a nature photographer. She was murdered by Palestinian Liberation Organisation members in a 1978 attack that became known as the Coastal Road massacre.

== Biography ==
Rubin was the only child of American businessman Jonathan Rubin and psychologist Estelle Rubin. She grew up in Manhattan's Upper East Side. She graduated from Dalton School in 1956. She began undergraduate studies at the University of Michigan and completed her degree at Finch College in New York in 1960. She worked in editorial positions with Viking Press and New Directions, and became managing editor at Delacorte Books.

In 1969 she traveled to Israel on vacation and decided to move there. There, she worked as a nature photographer and served as a war photographer during the Six-Day War and the Yom Kippur War. Her nature work was featured in U.S. Camera, Time-Life's Nature Science Annual 1976, Natural History, and Time-Life's Photography Annual 1979.

Her work was exhibited at the Jewish Museum in New York in February 1977, as well as at the Magnes Museum in Berkeley, California, and the Israel Museum in Jerusalem.

== Death ==
On March 11, 1978, Rubin was photographing birds at Kibbutz Ma'agan Michael in northern Israel. She was approached by a group of Palestinian militants who asked her where they were, after which they killed her and stole her car. She was the first of 38 people to die in what became the Coastal Road massacre. She was shot dead by Dalal Mughrabi.

She was a relative of then-U.S. Senator Abraham Ribicoff, who denounced her killing as "an indefensible act of terrorism that deserves universal condemnation".

Labor reporter A. H. Raskin delivered the eulogy at her funeral. She was buried at Union Field Cemetery in Ridgewood, Queens.

== Legacy ==
Her nature photography was the subject of a posthumous publication Psalmist with a Camera in 1979; her parents were instrumental in assembling the volume.

A traveling exhibit of her works opened in 1987 at the 92nd Street Y in New York and traveled to 15 other locations including the Cathedral of St. John the Divine, Long Island University, and the Bronx Museum of the Arts. The final exhibit location was at the Jerusalem Theatre in Israel in 1989.
