= Hot hand (disambiguation) =

A hot hand is a streak of good luck in a sport or gambling.

Hot hand or Hot hands may also refer to:

- Hot Hand (pinball), poker-based pinball machine
- Red hands, or Hot hands, a game in which two players try to slap each other's hands
