= Dalal Mughrabi =

Palestinian female militant (1959–1978)

- دلال المغربي
- Dalal Mughrabi
- Born: c. 1959; Beirut, Lebanon
- Died: 11 March 1978 (aged 18–19); Coastal Highway, Israel
- Occupation: Militant
- Known for: Coastal Road massacre

Dalal Mughrabi (Arabic: دلال المغربي, Dalāl al-Muġrabī; c. 1959 – 11 March 1978) was a Palestinian militant who was a member of the Fatah faction of the Palestine Liberation Organization (PLO) and participated in the 1978 Coastal Road massacre in Israel. The attack resulted in the death of 38 Israeli civilians, including 13 children. Mughrabi and eight other militants were also killed. While she has been hailed as a martyr and a national hero among many Palestinians, Israel and the United Nations have described her as a terrorist.

== Early life ==
Dalal Mughrabi was born and raised in the Palestinian refugee camp of Sabra in Beirut, Lebanon. Her father was a Palestinian refugee whose family home prior to the 1948 Palestine war was in Jaffa, Palestine. Her mother was Lebanese.

Originally educated as a nurse, Mughrabi decided to devote her life to politics when the Lebanese Civil War broke out in 1975. She joined Fatah and began working within the organization's communications service. She took part in the fighting against the Syrian army in the mountains southeast of Beirut when Syrian forces entered Lebanon in 1976 to assist the Phalangists and their allies. In 1977 she completed a three-month training course attaining her the rank of lieutenant. She was offered a post in Italy by Fatah as political officer working at the PLO office, but she declined choosing instead a military career.

== 1978 attack ==
Mughrabi was part of a group of eleven Palestinian and Lebanese militants who landed on March 11, 1978, on the coastal plain near Tel Aviv. Mughrabi allegedly led the group, though reports differ. The timing was aimed at scuttling peace talks between Menachem Begin and Anwar Sadat, and the intent was to "[attack] the ministry of defence in Tel Aviv" according to the Guardian, or "not to kill civilians, but to reach the Knesset and demand the release of Palestinian prisoners" according to Rashida Mughrabi, Dalal's sister, or to "kill as many Israelis as possible" according to Time magazine.

=== Killing of Gail Rubin ===
Landing at the beach, Mughrabi's group met American photographer Gail Rubin, who was taking nature photographs on the beach, and asked her where they were, after which they killed her. Both surviving members of the group later confirmed that it was Mughrabi who killed Rubin, who was the niece of US Senator Abraham A. Ribicoff.

=== Hijacking ===
The militants opened fire at passing traffic and hijacked a taxi, killing its occupants. They seized a bus and headed to Tel Aviv, and then hijacked another bus, moving the hostages (now numbering 71) to the first bus.

Israeli forces stopped the bus, and a shooting battle ensued before it exploded. During the shootout Mughrabi allegedly raised the Palestinian flag and declared the establishment of a Palestinian state. Israel says the bus exploded after Mughrabi blew it up with a grenade, while Palestinians say it was struck by fire from an Israeli helicopter gunship. A total of 38 Israelis, including 13 children, were killed and 72 were wounded; Mughrabi and eight other militants died as well.

== Release of remains ==
As part of the 2008 Israel–Hezbollah prisoner exchange, Mughrabi's remains were supposed to be exhumed and returned to Lebanon. She was buried in a "cemetery for enemy dead" but the Israel Defense Forces apparently could not locate the body due to underground currents moving the coffins in the cemetery. Mughrabi's sister told Ma'an News Agency that the family received a coffin that contained "just dirt and stones".

== Commemoration as a martyr ==
Among many Palestinians, Mughrabi is viewed as a martyr in the struggle for the liberation of Palestine. Among Israelis, she is viewed as a terrorist responsible for one of the deadliest terrorist attacks in the history of the State of Israel.

Numerous Palestinian sites and institutions, some inaugurated by the Palestinian Authority, bear her name, including a public square, schools, a computer center, a soccer tournament, and a summer camp.

The dedication of the public square in the city of al-Bireh was controversial. It was initially scheduled for March 2010 on the 32nd anniversary of the Coastal Road attack, and would also have coincided with a visit to the region by U.S. Vice President Joe Biden.

Public condemnation came from Benjamin Netanyahu, Israel's Prime Minister, who said the honoring of Mughrabi was anti-Israel incitement that "encourages terrorism", and United States Secretary of State Hillary Clinton, who said such actions were "provocations... needlessly inflaming tensions and imperiling prospects for a comprehensive peace." Dozens of Palestinian teenagers from Fatah's youth division and a senior Fatah official gathered at the square.

In March 2011, an official ceremony was held, installing a plaque that depicted Mughrabi cradling a rifle against a map of Israel, the West Bank and Gaza Strip.

In addition, the PA launched a seminar called "Martyr Dalal Mughrabi Camp," to be held in Jericho.

In May 2017, the Palestinian Authority via its organisation Women's Affairs Technical Committee (WATC) named a women's center in the town of Burqa after Mughrabi and celebrated her as a role model.

The center was built with the aid of the government of Norway and UN Women. Norway's Foreign Minister demanded that Norway's funding for the building be repaid and its logo removed from the building. He said that "Norway will not allow itself to be associated with institutions that take the names of terrorists in this way".

The United Nations also condemned the naming as "glorification of terrorism" and demanded its logo be removed from the building.

The Danish Ministry of Foreign Affairs started its own investigations of WATC and found it had withheld central information about the naming of the centre and terminated the working relationship with WATC. As a result of the findings, Denmark ceased funding 23 other NGOs in Palestine.

== See also ==
- Leila Khaled
- Abu Jihad
- Palestinian political violence
- Salah Al-Zawawi
