= October 1974 United Kingdom general election in Scotland =

- 10 October 1974

All 71 Scottish seats to the House of Commons
- Turnout: 74.8% (▼4.2%)
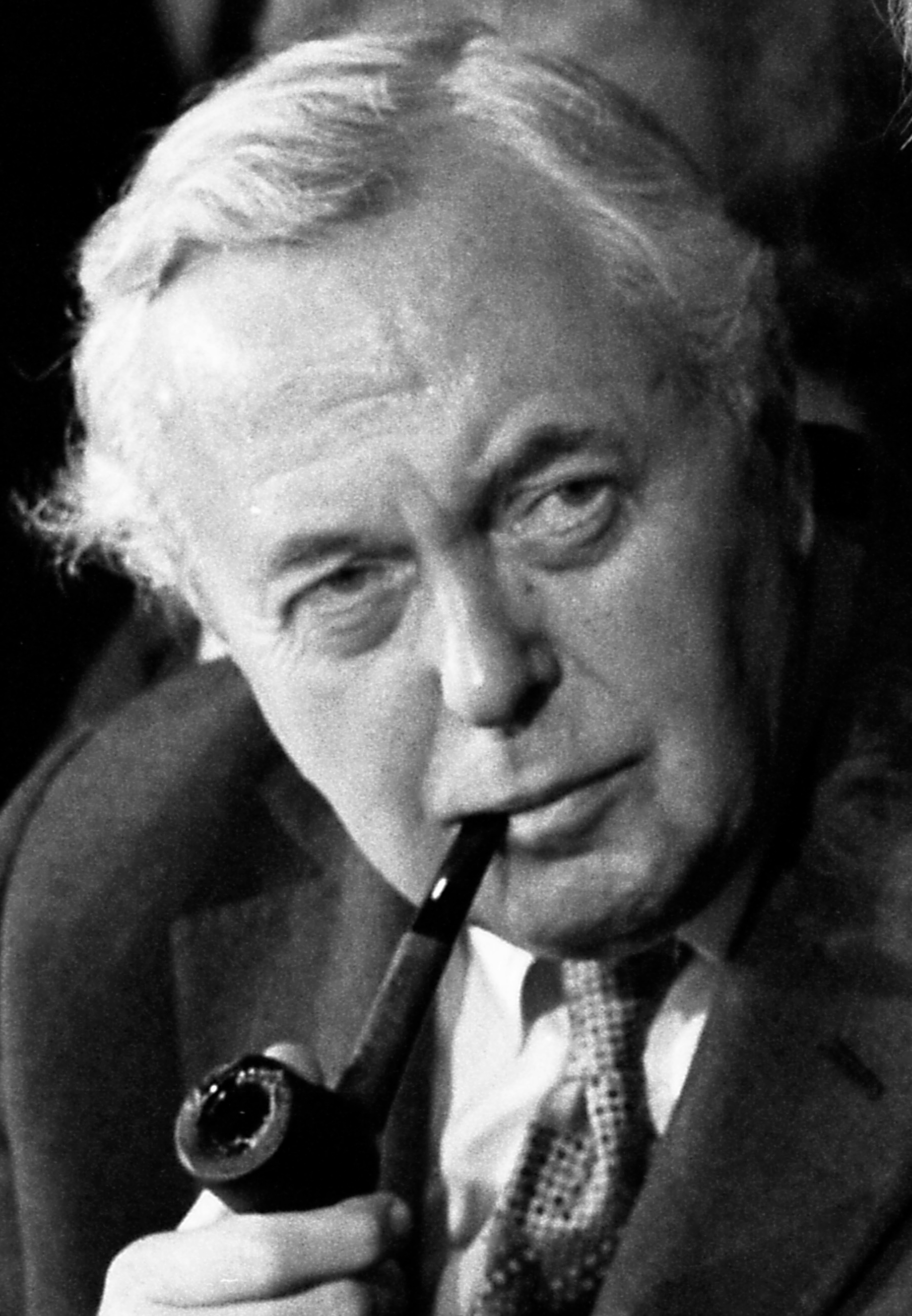

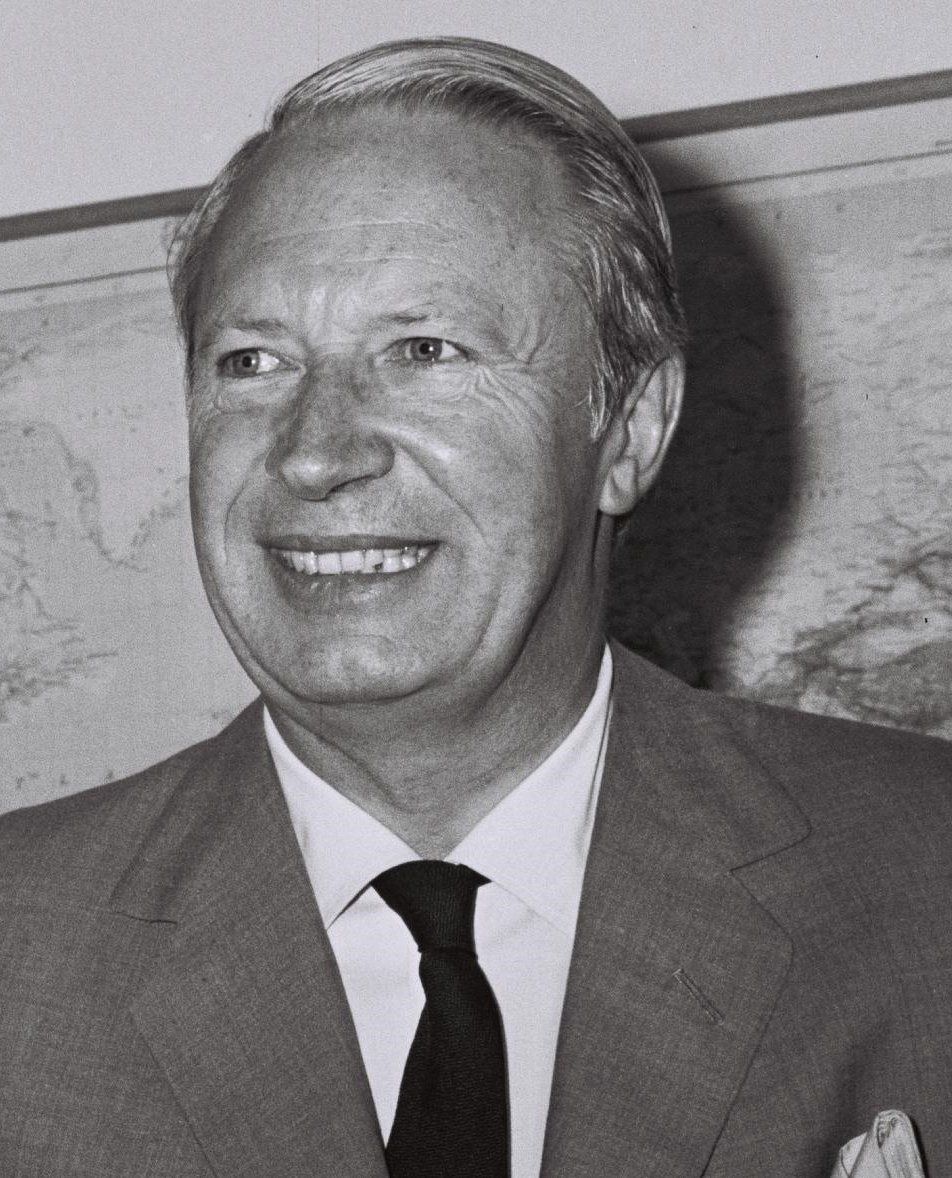
	First party	Second party
Leader	Harold Wilson	Edward Heath
Party	Labour	Conservative
Leader since	14 February 1963	28 July 1965
Leader's seat	Huyton	Sidcup
Last election	40 seats, 36.6%	21 seats, 32.9%
Seats won	41	16
Seat change	▲1	▼5
Popular vote	1,000,581	681,327
Percentage	36.3%	24.7%
Swing	▼0.3 pp	▼8.2 pp
	Third party	Fourth party
	SNP	Lib
Leader	William Wolfe	Jeremy Thorpe
Party	SNP	Liberal
Leader since	1 June 1969	18 January 1967
Leader's seat	Ran in West Lothian (defeated)	North Devon
Last election	7 seats, 21.9%	3 seats, 7.9%
Seats won	11	3
Seat change	▲4	Steady
Popular vote	839,617	228,855
Percentage	30.4%	8.3%
Swing	▲8.5 pp	▲0.4%

On Thursday 10 October 1974, the October 1974 United Kingdom general election was held in Scotland, to elect all 635 members of the House of Commons, with 71 constituencies being in Scotland.

It was the second general election held that year. This election was held just seven months after the previous general election, held in February 1974, had led to a hung parliament. Following the inconclusive nature of coalition talks between the Conservatives and other parties such as the Liberals and the disaffiliated Ulster Unionists, the Labour Leader Harold Wilson had gone on to form a minority government. After 8 months, Wilson felt he had demonstrated enough progress to win a majority, and called a second election. It was also the first year in which two general elections had been held in the same year since 1910; and the first time that two general elections had been held less than a year apart from each other since the 1923 and 1924 elections, which took place 10 months apart.

Across the United Kingdom, the election resulted in a narrow victory for the Labour Party, led by Prime Minister Harold Wilson, which won a wafer-thin majority of three seats, the narrowest in modern British history.

== Candidates ==
Below is a table summarising the candidates of the October 1974 general election in Scotland.

Affiliation	Candidates
Labour Party	71
Conservative and Unionist Party	71
Scottish National Party	71
Scottish Liberal Party	68
Communist Party of Great Britain	9
National Front	1
Campaign for a More Prosperous Britain	1 (Note: Candidate T. Clyde stood in Glasgow Govan.)
Fine Gael (Scotland)	1 (Note: Candidate Uilleam Bell stood in Inverness.)
Total	293

== Analysis ==
In Scotland the Conservative saw an 8.2% drop in support, and lost 5 seats. Although the Labour Party also saw a slight decline in vote share, it was able to pick up one additional seat. Between Labour and the Conservatives, Labour won Berwick and East Lothian.

The Scottish Liberal Party once again slightly increased its vote share and retained its seat in Inverness, with former Leader of the Liberal Party Jo Grimond retaining Orkney and Shetland and future Leader David Steel retaining Roxburgh, Selkirk and Peebles.

When combined with results from across the United Kingdom the election resulted in Labour winning a wafer-thin majority of three seats, the narrowest in modern British history.

The Scottish National Party became the second largest party in Scotland by popular vote for the first time in its history: with 30% of the Scottish popular vote and 11 of Scotland's 71 seats this was the party's most successful general election result until the 2015 election. The party retained Argyllshire, Banffshire, East Aberdeenshire, Moray and Nairn, Western Isles, Clackmannan and Eastern Stirlingshire and Dundee East. However, it further won East Dunbartonshire, Galloway, Perth and East Perthshire and South Angus from the Conservative Party.

== Results ==
Party	Seats					Aggregate votes		
Party	Total	Gains	Losses	Net	Of total (%)	Total	Of total (%)	Change (%)
Labour	41	1	0	▲1	57.7	1,000,581	36.3	▼0.3
SNP	11	4	0	▲4	15.5	839,617	30.4	▲8.5
Conservative	16	0	5	▼5	22.5	681,327	24.7	▼8.2
Liberal	3	0	0	Steady	4.2	228,855	8.3	▲0.4
Communist	0	0	0	Steady	—	7,453	0.3	▼0.2
National Front	0	New			—	86	0.0	New
More Prosperous Britain	0	New			—	27	0.0	New
Fine Gael (Scotland)	0	New			—	155	0.0	New
Blank and invalid votes						2,630	—	—
Total	36			0	100.0	2,758,101 (Note: All valid votes excluding spoiled votes.)	100.0	0.0
Registered voters, and turnout						3,686,792	74.8	▼4.2

Popular vote
Labour	36.3%
SNP	30.4%
Conservative	24.7%
Liberal	8.3%
Other	0.3%

Parliamentary seats
Labour	57.8%
Conservative	22.5%
SNP	15.5%
Liberal	4.2%

== See also ==
- October 1974 United Kingdom general election in England
- October 1974 United Kingdom general election in Wales
- October 1974 United Kingdom general election in Northern Ireland
- List of MPs for constituencies in Scotland (October 1974–1979)
