= 1968 United States Senate election in Connecticut =

- November 5, 1968
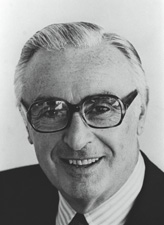

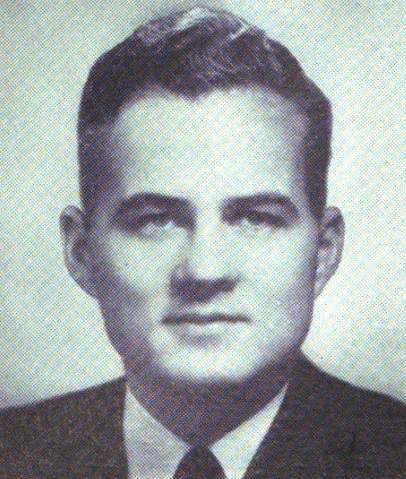
Nominee	Abraham Ribicoff	Edwin H. May Jr.
Party	Democratic	Republican
Popular vote	655,043	551,455
Percentage	54.29%	45.71%
- Ribicoff: 50–60% 60–70% 70–80% May: 50–60% 60–70% 70–80%
U.S. senator before election
Abraham Ribicoff
Democratic
Elected U.S. Senator
Abraham Ribicoff
Democratic

The 1968 United States Senate election in Connecticut took place on November 5, 1968. Incumbent Democratic U.S. Senator Abraham Ribicoff was re-elected to a second term in office over Republican U.S. Representative Edwin H. May Jr.

== General election ==
=== Results ===
1968 United States Senate election in Connecticut
Party	Candidate	Votes	%
Democratic	Abraham Ribicoff (inc.)	655,043	54.29%
Republican	Edwin H. May Jr.	551,455	45.71%
Write-in		39	0.00%
Total votes		1,206,537	100.00%

== See also ==
- 1968 United States Senate elections
