= Coastal road massacre =

1978 hijacking of an Israeli bus by Palestinian militants near Tel Aviv

- Part of the Palestinian insurgency in South Lebanon and the Israeli–Palestinian conflict
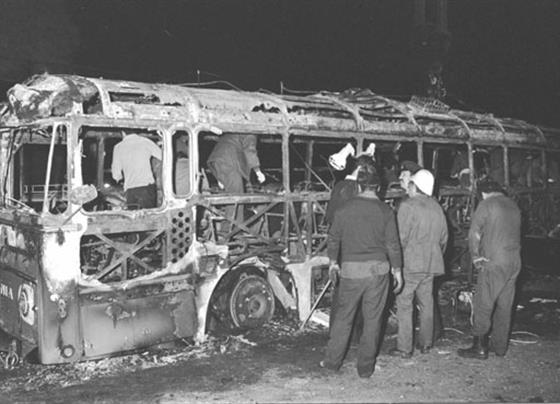
- Remains of the hijacked bus being inspected shortly after the attack

- The attack site
- Location: 32°08′52.6″N 34°48′11.4″E; Coastal Highway near Tel Aviv, Israel
- Date: 11 March 1978; 48 years ago
- Attack type: Mass murder, spree killing
- Weapons: Various weapons, possible grenade
- Deaths: 48 (plus nine Palestinian attackers)
- Injuries: 76
- Perpetrators: Fatah, PLO
- No. of participants: 11 militants

The coastal road massacre occurred on 11 March 1978, when Palestinian militants hijacked a bus on the Coastal Highway of Israel and murdered its occupants; 38 Israeli civilians, including 13 children, were killed as a result of the attack while 76 more were wounded. The attack was planned by the influential Palestinian militant leader Khalil al-Wazir (aka Abu Jihad) and carried out by Fatah, a Palestinian nationalist party co-founded by al-Wazir and Yasser Arafat in 1959. The initial plan of the militants was to seize a luxury hotel in the Israeli city of Tel Aviv and take tourists and foreign ambassadors hostage to exchange them for Palestinian prisoners in Israeli custody.

According to Time magazine, the timing was aimed primarily at undermining Israeli–Egyptian peace talks between Menachem Begin and Anwar Sadat and damaging Israel's tourism sector. However, due to a navigational error, the attackers ended up 64 kilometres (40 mi) north of their target, and were forced to find an alternative method of transportation to their destination.

Until the Nova music festival massacre which occurred in 2023, it was the deadliest terrorist attack in the history of Israel. Time characterized it as "the worst terrorist attack in Israel's history." Fatah dubbed the hijacking "Operation of the Martyr Kamal Adwan" after the chief of operations of the Palestine Liberation Organization (PLO), who was killed during the Israeli commando raid on Lebanon in April 1973. In response to the massacre, Israel launched Operation Litani against PLO bases in southern Lebanon three days later.

== Background and perpetrators ==
The PLO claimed responsibility for the attack, which was planned by influential Fatah leader Abu Jihad. The attack's purpose was to disrupt ongoing Israeli-Egyptian peace negotiations. Yasser Arafat and Abu Jihad feared that a truce between Israel and Egypt would be detrimental to their cause. The operation was considered to be of such importance that Abu Jihad, together with his operations commander for Lebanon Azmi Zair, personally briefed the participants.

Israel received intelligence of the planned attack from a Shin Bet source codenamed Housemaid, who met with Israeli military intelligence official Amos Gilad in a safehouse in Jerusalem and briefed him about the plans. The intelligence was confirmed by wiretaps of the PLO offices in Cyprus. Israeli intelligence pinpointed the PLO squad's base to the beach of Damour, learned the attackers' names, and discovered that the goal behind the planned raid was to disrupt peace negotiations with Egypt. On 5 March 1978, Israel launched a military operation to preempt the planned attack. Shayetet 13 naval commandos raided the PLO base at Damour to wipe out the squad, but only killed all of those in one building, while those in a nearby building, who did not come out or open fire, survived the raid.

After intelligence was received from Housemaid that not all of the PLO squad had been killed, Gilad demanded that the commandos be sent in again to wipe out the remaining guerrillas, arguing that as Abu Jihad now knew that Israel was aware of his plans he would be spurred to launch the attack sooner, but Defense Minister Ezer Weizman, not wanting headlines of an Israeli raid on Lebanon to cast a shadow over his upcoming visit to the Pentagon, refused to authorize another such mission. The surviving guerrillas proceeded to carry out the attack.

== Attack ==
=== Landing and initial attack ===
On 9 March 1978, 13 Palestinian fedayeen, including 18-year-old female Dalal Mughrabi, left Lebanon on a boat headed for the Israeli coast. They were equipped with Kalashnikov rifles, rocket-propelled grenades, light mortars and high explosives. On 11 March, they transferred to two Zodiac boats and headed towards the shore. One of the Zodiacs capsized in the rough weather, and two of the militants drowned, but the surviving 11 carried on with their mission.

The eleven survivors landed on a beach near the kibbutz Ma'agan Michael, located between Haifa and Hadera, north of Tel Aviv. Due to stormy weather they had lost their bearings and believed they had landed in Cyprus. They met American photographer Gail Rubin, who was taking nature photographs on the beach and asked her where they were, and were relieved when she told them they were in Israel. Then they killed her. Both surviving attackers said that Mughrabi shot Rubin, who was a niece of United States Senator Abraham A. Ribicoff.

=== Bus hijacking ===
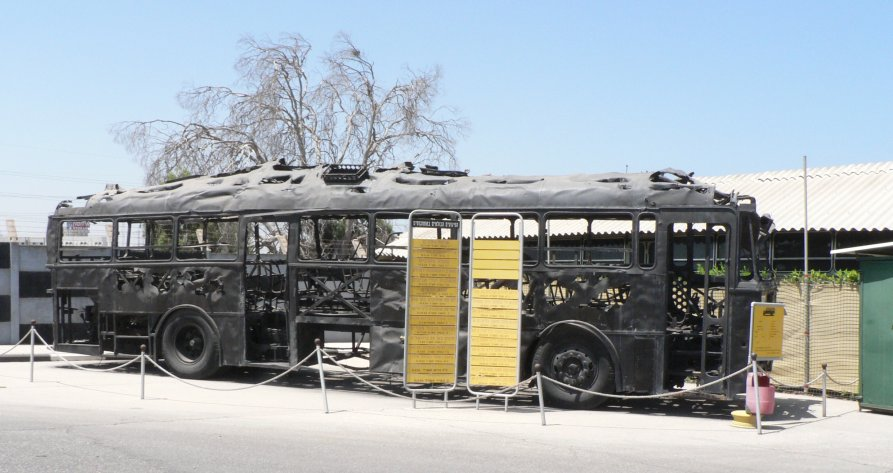
The remains of the hijacked bus on display

The militants then walked less than a mile up to the four-lane highway, opened fire at passing cars, and hijacked a white Mercedes taxi, killing its occupants. Setting off down the highway toward Tel Aviv, they hijacked a chartered bus carrying Egged bus drivers and their families on a day outing, along the Coastal Highway. Although Abu Jihad had ordered them to seize a hotel, the militants improvised and changed the nature of their attack due to the dozens of hostages in their hands. The militants drove down the coastal highway, shooting and throwing grenades at passing cars. They also shot at the passengers and threw at least one body out of the bus. At one point they commandeered Bus 901, traveling from Tel Aviv to Haifa, taking its passengers hostage as well, and forced the passengers from the first bus to board it.

At one point, the bus stopped, and one of the perpetrators got out and fired directly into a passing car, killing a teenager, Imri Tel-Oren, and injuring his father Hanoch. Sharon Tel-Oren, Imri's mother, testified: "We were in our station wagon, driving along the coastal highway. We saw something odd ahead – a bus, but it seemed to be stopped. Then we saw someone lying on the road. There was shattered glass all over, children screaming. Then we heard the gunshots. Imri was asleep in the back seat. The bullet passed through the front seat and hit his head, killing him instantly. My husband was shot in the arm, and lost the movement in his fingers."

Police were alerted to the attack; their cars caught up to the bus and trailed it. Although the militants fired at the pursuing police cars, policemen did not return fire, fearing they would hit the civilians inside the bus. Police quickly set up a roadblock, but the militants plowed the bus through it and continued their journey. According to Khaled Abu Asba, one of the two surviving attackers, police set up multiple roadblocks, and there was an exchange of fire at every intersection.

=== Standoff at the Glilot Junction ===
The bus was finally stopped by a large police roadblock set up at the Glilot Junction near Herzliya, which included nails planted on the road to puncture the bus' tires. Due to the speed at which the attack was transpiring, Israeli counter-terrorism squads had been unable to mobilize quickly enough, and the roadblock was manned by ordinary patrolmen and traffic policemen, who were lightly armed in comparison to the militants and untrained in dealing with hostage situations. A firefight erupted, and police broke the bus' windows and yelled at passengers to jump.

Escaping passengers were shot at by one of the militants. According to the Israeli police, Assaf Hefetz, then head of the Israeli Police counter-terrorism unit, arrived at the scene before his unit, and stormed the bus, killing two militants. Hefetz sustained a shoulder injury during the battle, and was later awarded the Israeli Police Medal of Courage.

The battle reached its climax when the bus exploded and burst into flames. Some of the militants and hostages escaped but most died in the fire. The explosion may have been set off by a burning fuel tank, or by grenades. Israeli journalist Ronen Bergman, in his book Rise and Kill First, which was based on interviews with Israeli intelligence veterans, claimed that the explosion was due to a grenade blast that came as a result of a scuffle between militants and hostage Avraham Shamir. According to Bergman, during the firefight, Shamir saw one of the militants resting the hand holding his pistol on his daughter's head, after which he charged at him, seized the gun, and shot a militant standing at the front of the bus, then fired three shots at another militant. Another hostage warned Shamir of a militant aiming his gun at him from behind, after which Shamir turned and they both fired, wounding each other. Shamir then saw the militant from whom he had seized the gun lying injured on the floor holding a grenade with the safety pin pulled out. After he dropped it on the floor, Shamir tried to use the militant's body to blunt the effects of the blast. The grenade's explosion killed the militant and five hostages, seriously wounded Shamir, and set the bus on fire.

A total of 38 civilians were killed in the attack, including 13 children, while 71 others were wounded. Of the 11 perpetrators, 9 were killed.

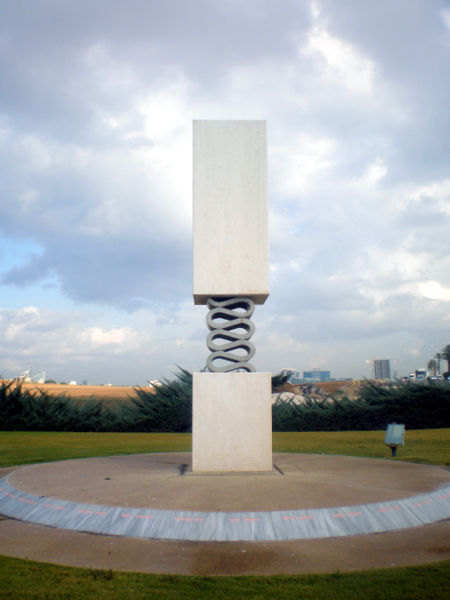
Memorial near Glilot Interchange on the coastal Highway

== Motives ==
One motive for the attack from the PLO was to derail Egypt-Israel peace talks. In October 1976, Egypt, the PLO, and Syria were back in contact with each other, though temporarily, under Saudi auspices, at the Riyadh conference that year. In 1977 "...the United States appeared anxious to coordinate Arab approval of a Geneva peace conference, as well as the presence there of Palestinians, and most important, the cooperation of the Soviet Union." Both the Egyptians and the Israelis were opposed to the possibility of a political settlement which would have the effect of uniting the Arabs with the Palestinians or the two superpowers against Israel. "No less than Israelis, therefore, Sadat opposed the joint US–USSR statement of October 1, 1977. Not only did the statement put the Palestinian question on a par with the return of Egyptian territory, it almost meant a clear victory for Syrian pan-Arabism."

The US–USSR joint statement stated the settlement of the Arab-Israeli conflict would be based on: "an Israeli withdrawal from 'occupied territories' in 1967; the resolution of the Palestinian question, including insuring the 'legitimate rights' of the Palestinian people; the termination of the state of war; and the establishment of normal peaceful relations on the basis of mutual recognition of sovereignty, territorial integrity, and political independence." Ultimately, America opted for an Egypt-Israel Peace Treaty as Anwar Sadat made a visit to Jerusalem in November 1977. In that treaty "the first item dropped was the question of Palestine as it had evolved through the United Nations; after that the US–USSR statement, and agreed upon Palestinian representation at the Geneva conference, were also dropped.". Anwar Sadat's main concern was the territory of Sinai to be returned to Egypt from Israel.

== Official reactions ==
Involved parties

Israel

- Israeli prime minister Menachem Begin stated in a press conference that Israel "shall not forget the carnage" and added that "there was no need of this outrage to understand that a Palestinian state would be a mortal danger to our nation and our people."

(Palestine) PLO

- The PLO official stated that "the operation stems from the firm belief of Fatah in the necessity of carrying on the armed struggle against the Zionist enemy within the occupied land."

International

- Egypt: Egyptian president Anwar Sadat condemned the attack as "an irresponsible action" and indirectly appealed to Israel not to strike back.
- United States: US president Jimmy Carter released a statement saying the attack was "an outrageous act of lawlessness and senseless brutality. Criminal acts such as this advance no cause or political belief. They inspire only revulsion at the lack of respect for innocent human life."

== Aftermath ==
=== Trial ===
The two surviving perpetrators, Khaled Abu Asba and Hussein Fayyad, were arrested and tried in an Israeli military court in Lod. They were charged with 10 counts of firing at people, two counts of placing and detonating explosives, and one count of membership in a hostile organization. Their trial opened on 9 August 1979. The trial was presided over by Judge Colonel Aharon Kolperin. The chief prosecutor was Amnon Straschnov, while Abu Asba and Fayyad were represented by defense lawyer Leah Tsemel. On 23 October 1979, they were convicted on all 13 charges. They were sentenced to life imprisonment, and spent seven years in prison before being released in the 1985 Jibril Agreement.

=== Israeli response ===
In a statement to the press the following day, Israeli Prime Minister Menachem Begin stated, "They came here to kill Jews. They intended to take hostages and threatened, as the leaflet they left said, to kill all of them if we did not surrender to their demands.... We shall not forget. And I can only call upon other nations not to forget that Nazi atrocity that was perpetrated upon our people yesterday."

Speaking to the Knesset on 13 March, Begin said, "Gone forever are the days when Jewish blood could be shed with impunity. Let it be known: Those who shed innocent blood shall not go unpunished. We shall defend our citizens, our women, our children. We shall sever the arm of iniquity."

On 15 March, three days after the massacre, Israel launched Operation Litani against PLO bases in southern Lebanon. The IDF spokesman stated, "The objective of the operation is not retaliation for the terrorists' crimes, for there can be no retaliation for the murder of innocent men, women and children – but to protect the state of Israel and its citizens from incursions of members of the Fatah and PLO, who use Lebanese territory in order to attack citizens of Israel." Augustus Richard Norton, professor of international relations at Boston University, said Operation Litani resulted in approximately 1,100 people killed, most of them Palestinian and Lebanese civilians.

=== Palestinian glorification of hijackers ===
Palestinian Media Watch, an Israeli NGO that monitors antisemitism and support for terrorism in Palestinian society, has cited examples of Palestinian media that portrays Dalal Mughrabi as a heroine and role model. A Hebron girls' school was briefly named in honor of Mughrabi but the name was changed after it emerged that USAID was funding the school. Her name has also been given to summer camps and both police and military courses. In February 2011, Palestinian Media Watch exposed a pan-Arab feminist media campaign promoting Mughrabi as a role model for women in the Arab world.

During the 2008 Israel-Hezbollah prisoner swap, Israel intended to transfer her body to Hezbollah, however DNA testing showed that her body was not among the exhumed corpses.

Several locations under Palestinian Authority control have been named after Mughrabi.

Palestinian Media Watch reported that, in January 2012, official Palestinian Authority television, which is under the control of PA chairman Mahmoud Abbas, rebroadcast a music video glorifying the attack. The words of the clip included: "We [PLO squad] set out on patrol from Lebanon; with no fear of death or the darkness of prison. On the coast [Dalal] Mughrabi's blood was shed, the color of [red] coral on [white] lemon flowers."

In 2011, a summer camp "which took place under the auspices of Prime Minister Salam Fayyad" divided the children into three groups named after militants, and one group was named for Mughrabi.

== See also ==
- November 1979 Palestinian protests
- Avivim school bus massacre
- List of massacres in Israel
