= October 1974 United Kingdom general election =

- 10 October 1974

All 635 seats in the House of Commons 318 seats needed for a majority
- Opinion polls
- Registered: 40,072,970
- Turnout: 29,189,104; 72.8% (▼6.0 pp)
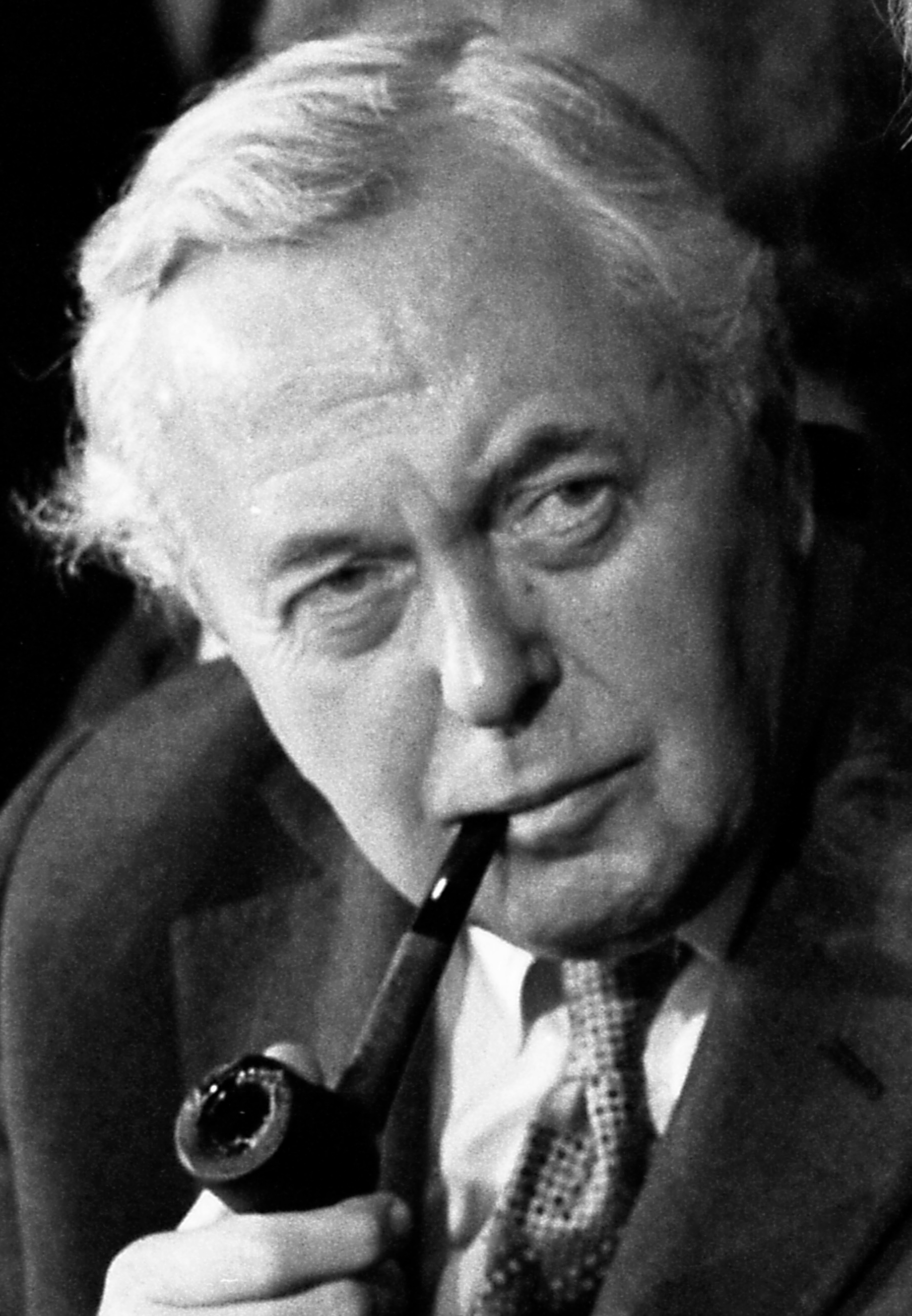

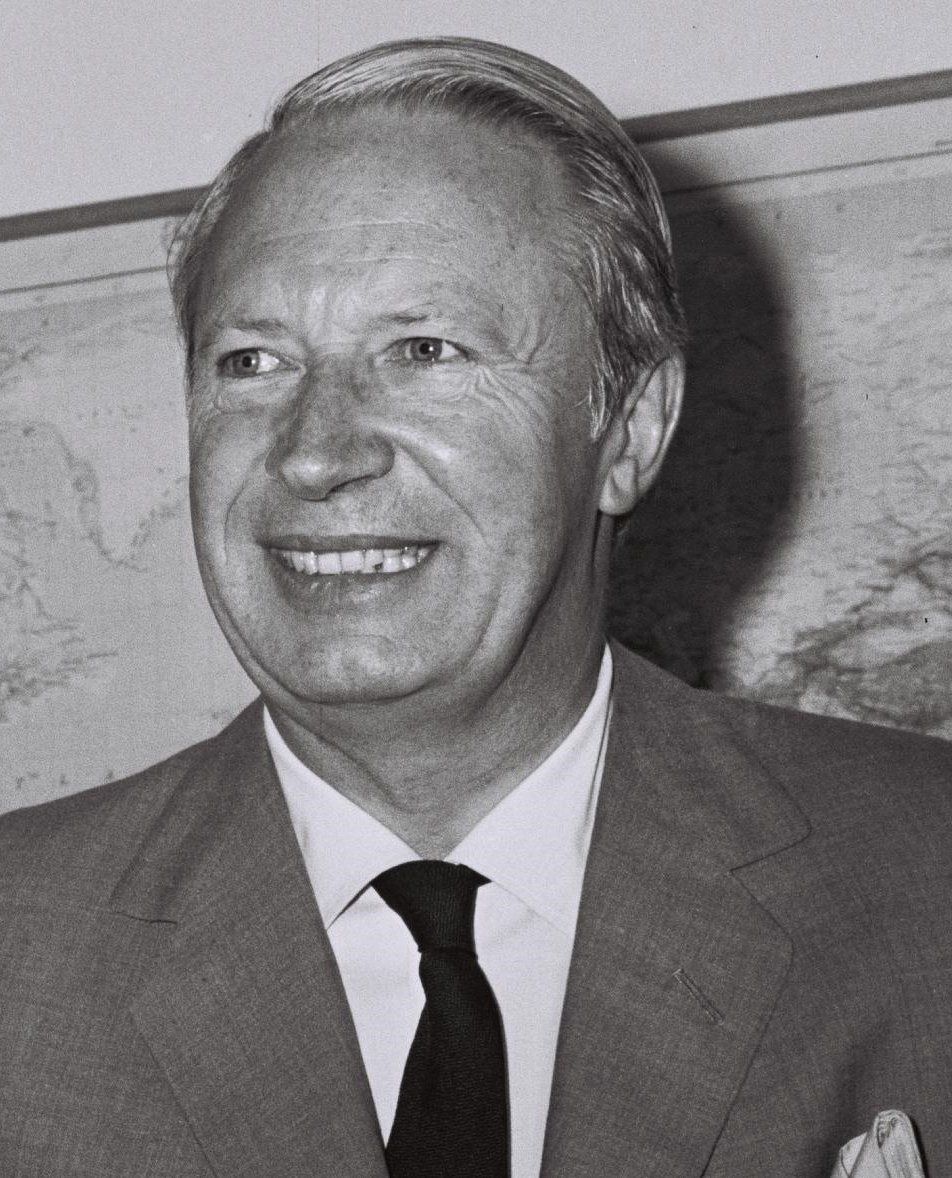
	First party	Second party
Leader	Harold Wilson	Edward Heath
Party	Labour	Conservative
Leader since	14 February 1963	28 July 1965
Leader's seat	Huyton	Sidcup
Last election	301 seats, 37.2%	297 seats, 37.9%
Seats won	319	277 (Note: Figure includes Speaker of the House of Commons Selwyn Lloyd in Wirral.)
Seat change	▲18	▼20
Popular vote	11,457,079	10,462,565
Percentage	39.2%	35.8%
Swing	▲2.0 pp	▼2.1 pp
	Third party	Fourth party
	Lib	SNP
Leader	Jeremy Thorpe	Billy Wolfe
Party	Liberal	SNP
Leader since	18 January 1967	1 June 1969
Leader's seat	North Devon	Ran in West Lothian (lost)
Last election	14 seats, 19.3%	7 seats, 2.0%
Seats won	13	11
Seat change	▼1	▲4
Popular vote	5,346,704	839,617
Percentage	18.3%	2.9%
Swing	▼1.0 pp	▲0.9 pp
- Colours denote the winning party—as shown in § Results

- Composition of the House of Commons after the election
Prime Minister before election
Harold Wilson
Labour
Prime Minister after election
Harold Wilson
Labour

A general election was held in the United Kingdom on Thursday 10 October 1974 to elect 635 members of the House of Commons. It was the second general election held that year; the first time that two general elections had been held in the same calendar year since 1910; and the first time that two general elections had been held less than a year apart from each other since the 1923 and 1924 elections, which took place 10 months apart.

The election resulted in a narrow victory for the Labour Party, led by Prime Minister Harold Wilson, which won a wafer-thin majority of three seats, the narrowest in modern British history. It was to remain the last general election victory for the Labour Party until 1997, with the Conservative Party winning majorities in the next four general elections. It would also be the last time Labour won more seats at a national election than the Conservatives until the 1989 European Parliament election. This remains the most recent general election that Labour made net gains in seats whilst in government.

The narrowness of the majority meant that the Labour government saw a gradual loss of its majority by 1977 through a series of by-election losses and defections, thus requiring deals with the Liberals, the Ulster Unionists, the Scottish Nationalists and the Welsh Nationalists. It led to the eventual defeat of the government in a no-confidence motion in March 1979, six months before the mandatory dissolution of Parliament was set to take place.

This election was held just seven months after the previous general election, held in February 1974, had led to a hung parliament, with Labour winning 301 seats and the Conservatives left with 297. Following the inconclusive nature of coalition talks between the Conservatives and other parties such as the Liberals and the Ulster Unionists, the Labour Leader Harold Wilson went on to form a minority government.

The October campaign was not as vigorous or exciting as the one in February. Despite continuing high inflation, Labour boasted that it had ended the miners' strike, which had dogged Heath's premiership, and had returned some stability. The Conservative Party, led by Leader of the Opposition and former Prime Minister Edward Heath, released a manifesto promoting national unity, but its chances of forming a government were hindered by the Ulster Unionist Party refusing to take the Conservative whip at Westminster in response to the Sunningdale Agreement of 1973.

Both the Conservatives and the Liberals saw their vote share decline, and Heath, who had lost three of the four elections that he contested, was ousted as Conservative leader in February 1975 and replaced with future Prime Minister Margaret Thatcher. The Scottish National Party won 30% of the Scottish popular vote and 11 of Scotland's 71 seats in the party's most successful general election result until 2015.

The election was broadcast live on the BBC and was presented by David Butler, Alastair Burnet, Robert McKenzie, Robin Day and Sue Lawley.

Since Jeremy Thorpe's death in December 2014, this is the latest election where all the three major party leaders have died.

== Campaign ==
The brief period between the elections gave Wilson the opportunity to demonstrate reasonable progress. Despite high inflation and high balance-of-trade deficits, the miners' strike, which had dogged Heath was over, and some stability had been restored. After the February election, Heath had remained largely out of the public eye.

As was expected, the campaign was not as exciting as the one in February, and overall coverage by broadcasters was significantly scaled back. The Conservatives campaigned on a manifesto of national unity in response to the mood of the public. Labour campaigned on its recent successes in government, and although the party was divided over Europe, the party's strengths outweighed that of Heath, who knew that his future relied on an election victory. Devolution was a key issue for the Liberals and the Scottish National Party, and it was now one that the two main parties also felt the need to address. The Liberals did not issue a new manifesto but simply reissued the one they had created for the last election.

== Timeline ==
Prime Minister Harold Wilson's decision to call a general election on 10 October was reported in the newspapers that were dated back to 9 September. The announcement was made through a ministerial broadcast on television on 18 September to announce that the election would be held on 10 October, less than eight months since the previous election. The key dates were as follows:

Friday 20 September	Dissolution of the 46th Parliament and campaigning officially begins
Monday 30 September	Last day to file nomination papers
Wednesday 9 October	Campaigning officially ends
Thursday 10 October	Polling day
Friday 11 October	The Labour Party wins control with a majority of 3
Tuesday 22 October	47th Parliament assembles
Tuesday 29 October	State Opening of Parliament

== Results ==
Labour achieved a swing of 2% against the Conservatives. It was the first time since 1922 that a government had won an overall majority with less than 40% of the vote, albeit a majority of only three seats. The Conservatives won just under 36% of the vote, their worst share since 1918. A slight drop in the Liberals' vote saw them suffer a net loss of one seat. In Scotland, the Scottish National Party added another 4 seats to their successes in the previous election and became the fourth-largest party.

Turnout was 72.8%, which was a significant decline on the February election's 78.8% turnout.

=== Summary of seats returned ===
Party	Leader	MPs		Aggregate votes	
Party	Leader		Of total		Of total
Labour Party	Harold Wilson	319 (Note: Includes 14 Co-operative Party MP, as part of the Labour-Co-op alliance.)	50.2%	11,457,079	39.3%
Conservative and Unionist Party	Edward Heath	277	43.6%	10,462,565	35.8%
Liberal Party	Jeremy Thorpe	13	2.0%	5,346,704	18.3%
Scottish National Party	William Wolfe	11	1.7%	839,617	2.9%
Ulster Unionist Party	Harry West	6	0.9%	256,065	0.9%
Plaid Cymru	Gwynfor Evans	3	0.5%	166,321	0.6%
Vanguard Unionist Progressive Party	William Craig	3	0.5%	92,262	0.3%
Social Democratic and Labour Party	Gerry Fitt	1	0.2%	154,193	0.5%
Democratic Unionist Party	Ian Paisley	1	0.2%	59,451	0.2%
Independent Republican	—N/a	1	0.2%	32,795	0.1%

=== Full results ===

Results of the October 1974 general election to the House of Commons of the United Kingdom
Party	Leader	Candidates	MPs					Aggregate votes		
Party	Leader	Candidates	Total	Gains	Losses	Net	Of total (%)	Total	Of total (%)	Change (%)
Labour	Harold; Wilson	623 (Note: Includes 22 Co-operative Party candidates, as part of the Labour-Co-op alliance.)	319 (Note: Includes 14 Co-operative Party MPs, as part of the Labour-Co-op alliance.)	19	1	▲18 (Note: Includes 0 Co-operative Party MPs, as part of the Labour-Co-op alliance.)	50.2 (Note: Includes 2.2% for the Co-operative Party, as part of the Labour-Co-op alliance.)	11,457,079 (Note: Includes 465,592 for the Co-operative Party, as part of the Labour-Co-op alliance.)	39.3 (Note: Includes 1.6% for the Co-operative Party, as part of the Labour-Co-op alliance.)	▼5.9 (Note: Includes ▼0.1% for the Co-operative Party, as part of the Labour-Co-op alliance.)
Conservative	Edward; Heath	622	277	2	22	▼20	43.6	10,462,565	35.8	▼2.1
Liberal	Jeremy; Thorpe	619	13	0	1	▼1	2.1	5,346,704	18.3	▼1.0
SNP	William; Wolfe	71	11	4	0	▲4	1.7	839,617	2.9	▲0.9
UUP	Harry; West	7	6	0	1 (Note: Leader Harry West in Fermanagh and South Tyrone.)	▼1	0.9	256,065	0.9	▲0.2
Plaid Cymru	Gwynfor; Evans	36	3	1	0	▲1	0.5	166,321	0.6	▲0.1
SDLP	Gerry; Fitt	9	1 (Note: Gerry Fitt in Belfast West.)	0	0	Steady	0.2	154,193	0.5	Steady
National; Front	John; Kingsley Read	90	0	0	0	Steady	—	113,843	0.4	▲0.2
Vanguard; Unionist	William; Craig	3	3	0	0	Steady	0.5	92,262	0.2	▲0.1
DUP	Ian; Paisley	2	1 (Note: Ian Paisley in North Antrim.)	0	0	Steady	0.2	59,451	0.2	Steady
Alliance	Oliver; Napier	5	0	0	0	Steady	—	44,644	0.2	▲0.1
Independent; Republican	—N/a	1	1 (Note: Frank Maguire in Fermanagh and South Tyrone.)	1	0	▲1	0.2	32,795	0.1	▲0.1
Independent; Labour	—N/a	3	0	0	1 (Note: Eddie Milne in Blyth Valley.)	▼1	—	30,578	0.1	Steady
Republican; Clubs	Tomás; Mac Giolla	5	0	0	0	Steady	—	21,633	0.1	Steady
Unionist Party NI	Brian; Faulkner	2	0	0	0	Steady	—	20,454	0.1	▼0.2
Communist	John; Gollan	29	0	0	0	Steady	—	17,426	0.1	Steady
Democratic; Labour	Dick; Taverne	1	0	0	1 (Note: Leader Dick Taverne in Lincoln.)	▼1	—	13,714	0.1	Steady
NI; Labour	Alan; Carr	3	0	0	0	Steady	—	11,539	0.0	▼0.1
Independent	—N/a	18	0	0	0	Steady	—	7,073	0.0	▼0.1
Independent; Unionist	—N/a	1 (Note: Stanley McMaster stood in Belfast South.)	0	Did not stand in Feb. 1974			—	4,982	0.0	—N/a
United; Democratic	James; Tippett	13	0	New			—	4,810	0.0	New
More Prosperous Britain	Tom; Keen	25	0	0	0	Steady	—	4,434	0.0	Steady
Workers; Revolutionary	Gerry; Healy	10	0	0	0	Steady	—	3,404	0.0	Steady
Volunteer; Political	Ken; Gibson	1 (Note: Chiarman Ken Gibson stood in Belfast West.)	0	New			—	2,690	0.0	New
Independent; Conservative	—N/a	2	0	0	0	Steady	—	2,646	0.0	Steady
Independent; Liberal	—N/a	2	0	0	0	Steady	—	2,558	0.0	▼0.1
Irish; Civil Rights	—N/a	7	0	New			—	2,381	0.0	New
PEOPLE	Tony; Whittaker	5	0	0	0	Steady	—	1,996	0.0	Steady
Ind. Labour Party	Emrys; Thomas	2	0	0	0	Steady	—	1,335	0.0	Steady
Marxist-Leninist (England)	John; Buckle	8	0	0	0	Steady	—	1,320	0.0	Steady
United; English National	—N/a	1 (Note: Candidate A.S. Ashby stood in Derby South.)	0	New			—	793	0.0	New
English; National	Frank; Hansford-Miller	2	0	0	0	Steady	—	723	0.0	Steady
Whig; Party	—N/a	1 (Note: Candidate Cecil Margolis stood in Harrogate.)	0	New			—	719	0.0	New
Independent; English Nationalist	—N/a	1 (Note: Candidate Julian Barbour stood in Banbury.)	0	New			—	547	0.0	New
Labour; Democrat	—N/a	1 (Note: Candidate D. Fallon stood in Islington North.)	0	0	0	Steady	—	558	0.0	Steady
Marxist–Leninist (Ireland)	Carole; Reakes	3	0	New			—	540	0.0	New
World; Middle Classes	—N/a	1 (Note: Candidate R. R. Goding stood in Bristol South East.)	0	New			—	457	0.0	New
Independent; British Nationalist	—N/a	1 (Note: Candidate William Stringer stood in Croydon North East.)	0	New			—	451	0.0	New
Christian; Party	—N/a	1 (Note: Candidate A Storkey stood in Bassetlaw.)	0	New			—	408	0.0	New
Mebyon; Kernow	Richard; Jenkin	1 (Note: Candidate James Whetter stood in Truro.)	0	0	0	Steady	—	384	0.0	Steady
Go to Blazes	—N/a	1 (Note: Candidate David Sutch stood in Stafford and Stone.)	0	New			—	351	0.0	New
British; Candidate	—N/a	1 (Note: Candidate Edward .B Jones stood in Carmarthen.)	0	New			—	342	0.0	New
Women's; Rights	—N/a	1 (Note: Candidate Una Kroll stood in Sutton and Cheam.)	0	New			—	298	0.0	New
Anti- EEC	—N/a	1 (Note: Candidate W. Burgess stood in Twickenham.)	0	0	0	Steady	—	287	0.0	Steady
People; Power	—N/a	1 (Note: Candidate Mervyn Taggart stood in Reigate.)	0	New			—	266	0.0	New
United Kingdom; Front	—N/a	1 (Note: Candidate S Rowe stood in Newcastle-under-Lyme.)	0	New			—	256	0.0	New
Gay; Liberal	—N/a	1 (Note: Candidate M. J. Greatbanks stood in Norwood.)	0	New			—	223	0.0	New
Labour-Conservative; Coalition	—N/a	1 (Note: Candidate Christopher Wertheim stood in Paddington.)	0	New			—	192	0.0	New
Protest; Party	—N/a	1 (Note: Candidate H.L. Stratton stood in York.)	0	New			—	171	0.0	New
Fine Gael (Scotland)	—N/a	1 (Note: Candidate Uilleam Bell stood in Inverness.)	0	New			—	155	0.0	New
Social; Credit	—N/a	1 (Note: Candidate Archie S. Frost stood in Rugby.)	0	0	0	Steady	—	137	0.0	Steady
Anti-Party; System	—N/a	1 (Note: Candidate R.J. Bridgwater stood in North Cornwall.)	0	New			—	148	0.0	New
Socialist (GB)	Collective; Leadership	1 (Note: Candidate Ralph Critchfield stood in Hampstead.)	0	Did not stand in Feb. 1974			—	118	0.0	—N/a
Air Road; Public Safety	William; Boaks	1 (Note: Candidate William Boaks stood in Merton, Mitcham and Morden.)	0	New			—	68	0.0	New
Blank and invalid votes								37,706	—	—
Total		2,252	635			0	100.0	29,189,104 (Note: All valid votes excluding spoiled votes.)	100.0	0.0
Registered voters, and turnout								40,072,970	72.8	▼6.0

=== Votes summary ===
Popular vote
Labour	39.25%
Conservative	35.84%
Liberal	18.32%
Scottish National	2.88%
Others	3.71%

=== Seats summary ===
Parliamentary seats
Labour	50.24%
Conservative	43.62%
Liberal	2.05%
Scottish National	1.73%
Others	2.36%

=== Results by voter characteristics ===
Ethnic group voting intention
Ethnic group	Party		
Ethnic group	Labour	Conservative	Other
Ethnic minority (non-White)	81%	9%	10%
Asian	78%	12%	n/a
Afro-Caribbean	79%	6%	n/a

== Incumbents defeated ==
Party	Name	Constituency	Office held whilst in Parliament	Year elected	Defeated by	Party
Conservative	Jock Bruce-Gardyne	Angus South		1964	Andrew Welsh	SNP
Conservative	Michael Ancram	Berwick and East Lothian		Feb 1974	John Mackintosh	Labour
Conservative	Harold Gurden	Birmingham Selly Oak		1955	Tom Litterick	Labour
Conservative	Robert Redmond	Bolton West		1970	Ann Taylor	Labour
Conservative	Martin McLaren	Bristol North West		1970	Ronald Thomas	Labour
Conservative	Michael Fidler	Bury and Radcliffe		1970	Frank White	Labour
Conservative	Barry Henderson	East Dunbartonshire		Feb 1974	Margaret Bain	SNP
Conservative	James Allason	Hemel Hempstead		1959	Robin Corbett	Labour
Conservative	Tom Iremonger	Ilford North		1954 by-election	Millie Miller	Labour
Conservative	Ernle Money	Ipswich		1970	Ken Weetch	Labour
Conservative	Tom Boardman	Leicester South	Chief Secretary to the Treasury (1974)	1967 by-election	Jim Marshall	Labour
Conservative	Jack d'Avigdor-Goldsmid	Lichfield and Tamworth		1970	Bruce Grocott	Labour
Conservative	David Waddington	Nelson and Colne		1968 by-election	Doug Hoyle	Labour
Conservative	Montague Woodhouse	Oxford		1970	Evan Luard	Labour
Conservative	Ian MacArthur	Perth and East Perthshire		1959	Douglas Crawford	SNP
Conservative	Harmar Nicholls	Peterborough		1950	Michael Ward	Labour
Conservative	Peggy Fenner	Rochester and Chatham	Parliamentary Under-Secretary for the Ministry of Agriculture, Fisheries and Food (1972–1974)	1970	Robert Bean	Labour
Conservative	Ronald Bray	Rossendale		1970	Michael Noble	Labour
Conservative	James Hill	Southampton Test		1970	Bryan Gould	Labour
Conservative	Piers Dixon	Truro		1970	David Penhaligon	Liberal
Conservative	Robert Lindsay	Welwyn and Hatfield	Minister of State for Foreign Affairs (1972–1974)	1955	Helene Hayman	Labour
Labour	Gwynoro Jones	Carmarthen		1970	Gwynfor Evans	Plaid Cymru
Liberal	Paul Tyler	Bodmin, Cornwall		Feb 1974	Robert Hicks	Conservative
Liberal	Michael Winstanley	Hazel Grove		Feb 1974	Tom Arnold	Conservative
Liberal	Christopher Mayhew	Woolwich East (contested Bath)		1951 by-election	Edward Brown	Conservative
Independent	Eddie Milne	Blyth		1960 by-election	John Ryman	Labour
Independent	Edward Griffiths	Sheffield Brightside		1968 by-election	Joan Maynard	Labour
UUP	Harry West	Fermanagh and South Tyrone	Leader of the Ulster Unionist Party (1974 –1979)	Feb 1974	Frank Maguire	Independent
Democratic Labour	Dick Taverne	Lincoln	Financial Secretary to the Treasury (1969–1970)	1962 by-election	Margaret Jackson	Labour

== See also ==
- List of MPs elected in the October 1974 United Kingdom general election
- October 1974 United Kingdom general election in England
- October 1974 United Kingdom general election in Scotland
- October 1974 United Kingdom general election in Wales
- October 1974 United Kingdom general election in Northern Ireland
- Labour government, 1974–1979
