= White Hands Campaign =

The White Hands Campaign (Arabic: حملة الأيادي البيضاء) is an international media initiative aimed at promoting awareness of women's rights in the Arab world. Launched in collaboration with the Arab Producers Union for TV (APUTV) in 2009, it seeks to invest in media projects – audio, print and visual – that support women's issues, with the ultimate goal of attaining complete equality in all spheres of Arab society. Calling itself "The Largest Media Campaign to Support Women's Issues," it boasts of having partnered with more than 65 television channels.

In February 2011, the White Hands Campaign drew criticism for its inclusion of Dalal Mughrabi, a Palestinian terrorist involved in the 1978 massacre of 37 Israeli civilians and an American photographer, in its Distinguished Women series. Consequently, the United Nations Population Fund (UNFPA), whose logo had appeared as a sponsor of the White Hands Campaign, issued a statement denying any involvement and further clarifying that it "condemns any acts of violence that take the lives of innocent people."

== Background ==
In 2009 the Arab Producers' Union for TV (APUTV), an organization affiliated with the Arab League, launched an international media initiative aimed at raising awareness to a variety of women's issues in the Arab world, including health, education, employment and social standing. It was given the name The White Hands Campaign. According to the campaign's English website, "Women face all kinds of violence, and are deprived [of] many rights such as their right to education and work." The campaign endeavors to remedy this reality by tapping into the potential offered by the modern media, creating audio, video and print programs that showcase feminine creativity and empower women.

== Dalal Mughrabi controversy ==
One of the White Hands campaigns, The Distinguished Woman, features a pantheon of notable feminine figures, including Ishtar, Cleopatra and the Queen of Sheba, as "great models to be followed by the old or the young." Also featured in the campaign is Dalal Mughrabi, one of eleven Palestinian terrorists behind the massacre of 37 Israeli civilians and an American nature photographer in March 1978.

In February 2011, the media watchdog Palestinian Media Watch posted a report on its web bulletin implicating the United Nations for partnering in the campaign. Referring to a video clip aired "on more than 50 Arab TV stations" portraying Mughrabi as a heroine, the report stated: "The clip was broadcast as part of the 'White Hands Campaign - The largest media campaign to support women's issues,' which is organized 'by the Arab Producers Union for TV (APUTV) in cooperation with the United Nations Population Fund (UNFPA),' according to the campaign's English website."

Shortly after being called on by the American Jewish Committee to dissociate from the White Hands Campaign, the UNFPA issued a statement denying any involvement and stressing that it "condemns any acts of violence that take the lives of innocent people." In a communiqué addressed to Palestinian Media Watch, the UNFPA explained that in 2008 it had "provided APUTV with information and data on reproductive health and youth issues." It stressed, however, that it provided no funding for the White Hands Campaign and that it was "neither consulted nor involved in the selection of Arab women to be featured in the initiative."
