= Edwin H. May Jr. =

American politician from Connecticut (1924–2002)

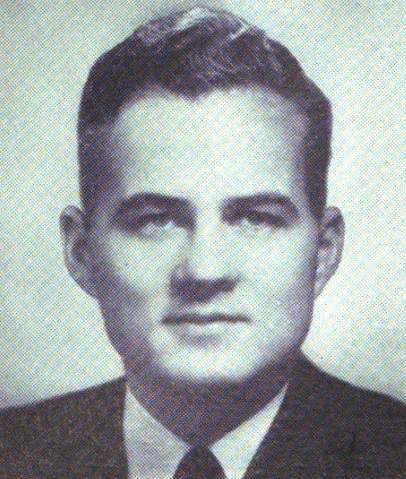

Member of the U.S. House of Representatives from Connecticut's 1st district
- In office January 3, 1957 – January 3, 1959
- Preceded by: Thomas J. Dodd
- Succeeded by: Emilio Q. Daddario

Personal details
- Born: May 28, 1924 Hartford, Connecticut, U.S.
- Died: February 20, 2002 (aged 77) Fort Pierce, Florida, U.S.
- Party: Republican

Edwin Hyland May Jr. (May 28, 1924 – February 20, 2002) was an American businessman and politician who served as a U.S. representative from Connecticut.

Born in Hartford, Connecticut, May graduated from Wethersfield High School, Wethersfield, Connecticut, 1942. He graduated from Wesleyan University, Middletown, Connecticut, 1948. He was in the United States Army Air Corps from 1942 to 1945. Thereafter, he was both a business and an insurance and executive. May was the co-chairman of the inaugural Insurance City Open (now the Travelers Championship) at the Wethersfield Country Club.

May was elected as a Republican to the Eighty-fifth Congress in 1956. May voted in favor of the Civil Rights Act of 1957. He was an unsuccessful candidate for reelection to the Eighty-sixth Congress in 1958. May was Connecticut state Republican chairman from 1958 to 1962, an unsuccessful candidate for Republican nomination for governor of Connecticut in 1962, and a delegate to the Connecticut constitutional convention in 1965. He was an unsuccessful candidate for the United States Senate in 1968.

He died on February 20, 2002, in Fort Pierce, Florida. May was posthumously inducted into the Connecticut State Golf Association the same year.

Party political offices
Preceded by Horace Seely-Brown Jr.	Republican nominee for U.S. Senator from Connecticut (Class 3); 1968	Succeeded by James H. Brannen III
U.S. House of Representatives
Preceded by Thomas J. Dodd	Member of the U.S. House of Representatives from Connecticut's 1st congressional district 1957–1959	Succeeded by Emilio Q. Daddario
