= White hand =

White Hand or Whitehand may refer to:

== Organizations ==
- Mano Blanca ('White Hand'), a Guatemalan anti-communist death squad 1966–1978
- White Hand (Serbia), a secret military organization in the early 1900s
- White Hand Gang, anti-Italian Irish gangs in New York in the early 1900s
- White Hand Campaign, a campaign for a worldwide legal ban of child corporal punishment
- White Hand Society, an organization formed by Italian-Americans to combat Black Hand criminality in Chicago

== People ==
- Humbert I, Count of Savoy (c. 980 – c. 1042), known as Humbert the White-Handed
- William of the White Hands (1135–1202), a French cardinal

== Other uses ==
- White hand sign, a medical sign observed as a visible whitening of skin on the hand
- White Hands Campaign, an initiative promoting women's rights in the Arabic world
- White Hands (film), a 1922 American film directed by Lambert Hillyer
- Gilbert Whitehand, a member of Robin Hood's Merry Men
- Hands (advertisement), sometimes known as "White Hands", a controversial 1990 American political advertisement
- White Hand, a fictitious Pokémon creepypasta character associated with the Lavender Town Syndrome creepypastas.

== See also ==
- Hand (disambiguation)
- Gareth, a Knight of the Round Table, nicknamed "Beaumains", sometimes translated as "Fair Hands"
