= Assaf Hefetz =

Israeli police chief

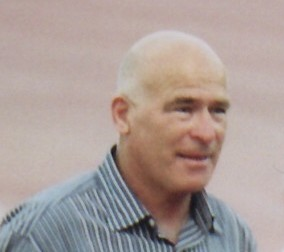
Assaf Hefetz

Assaf Hefetz (Hebrew: אסף חפץ; born 1944) was commissioner of the Israeli Police.

== Biography ==
Hefetz was born in Kfar Menahem. He was drafted into the Israeli Defense Forces in 1962. He volunteered as a paratrooper in the Paratroopers Brigade. He served as a soldier and a squad leader. In 1964 he became an infantry officer after completing Officer Candidate School and returned to the Paratroopers Brigade as a platoon leader in the Brigade's 890 battalion. Hefetz fought in the Six-Day War and the War of Attrition. During the Yom Kippur War he commanded a paratroop force through the battles in the Sinai Peninsula, and afterwards commanded the 202 paratroop battalion.

In 1978, Hefetz was appointed leader of the Israeli Border Police Yamam anti-terrorism unit. Later that year, during the Coastal Road massacre, a hijacked bus was finally stopped by a police roadblock set up at the Glilot Junction near Herzliya. Hefetz arrived at the scene before his unit, and stormed the bus, killing two of the hijackers. Hefetz sustained a shoulder injury during the battle. In 1980, Hefetz was awarded the Israeli Police Medal of Courage for this act.

He became general commissioner (commander of the police) in 1994, a position which he held until 1997.
