= October 1974 United Kingdom general election in Wales =

- 10 October 1974

All 36 Welsh seats to the House of Commons
- Turnout: 76.6% (▼3.4 pp)
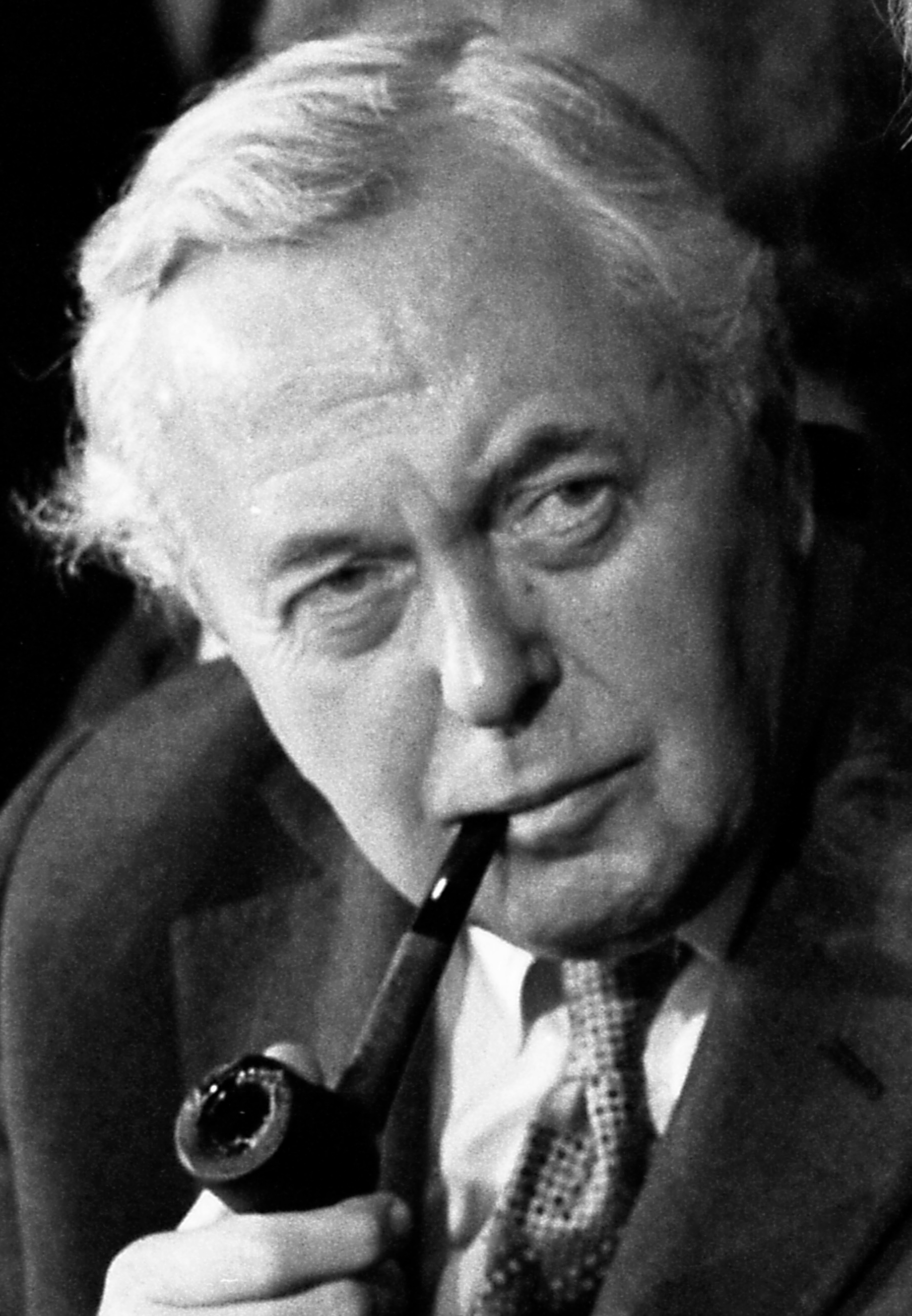

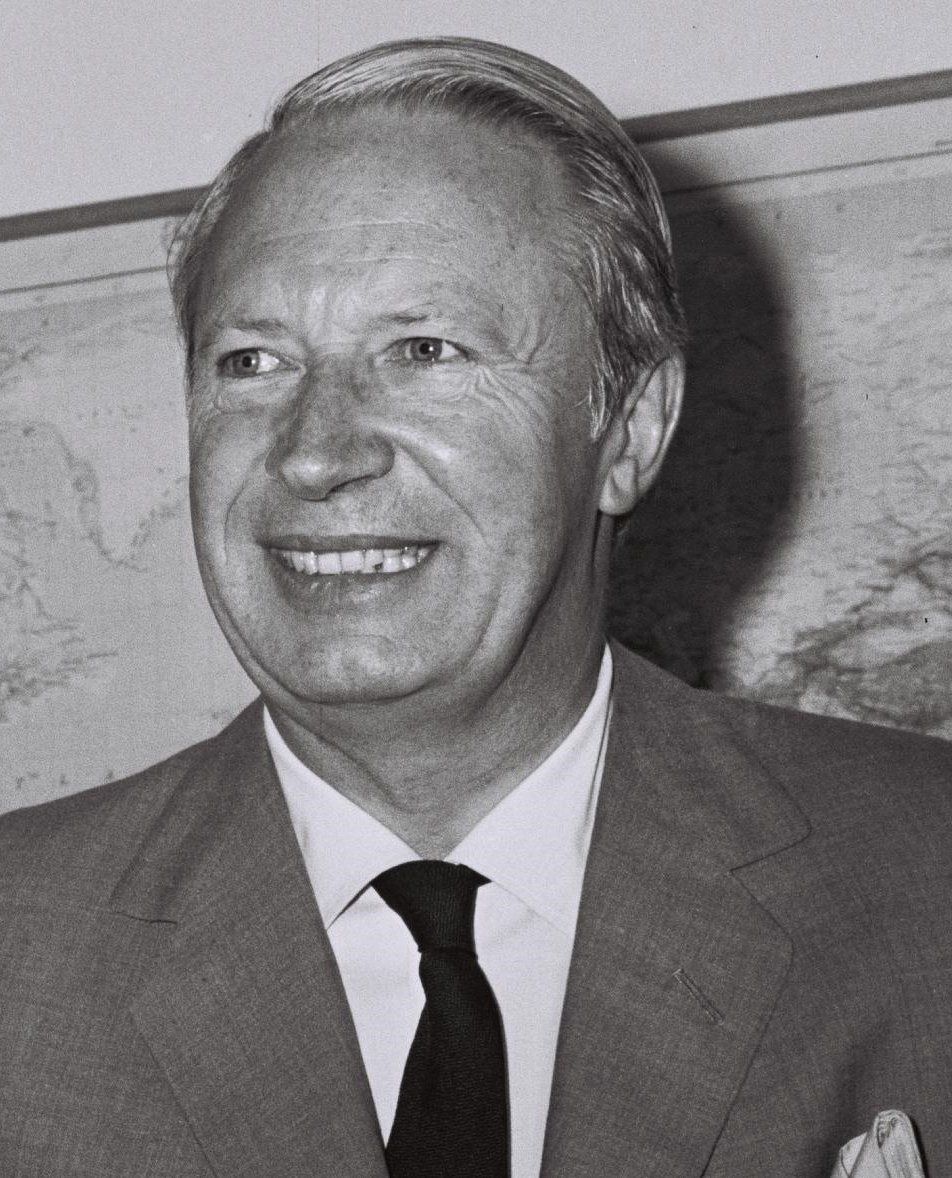

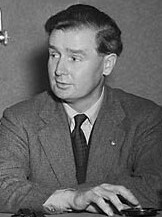
	First party	Second party
Leader	Harold Wilson	Edward Heath
Party	Labour	Conservative
Leader since	14 February 1963	28 July 1965
Leader's seat	Huyton	Sidcup
Last election	24 seats, 46.8%	8 seats, 25.9%
Seats won	23	8
Seat change	▼1	Steady
Popular vote	761,447	367,230
Percentage	49.5%	23.9%
Swing	▲2.7 pp	▼2.0 pp
	Third party	Fourth party
	Lib
Leader	Jeremy Thorpe	Gwynfor Evans
Party	Liberal	Plaid Cymru
Leader since	18 January 1967	1 August 1945
Leader's seat	North Devon	Ran in Carmarthen (won)
Last election	2 seats, 16.0%	2 seats, 10.8%
Seats won	2	3
Seat change	Steady	▲1
Popular vote	239,057	166,321
Percentage	15.5%	10.8%
Swing	▼0.5 pp	Steady

On Thursday 10 October 1974, the October 1974 United Kingdom general election was held in Wales, to elect all 635 members of the House of Commons, with 36 constituencies being in Wales.

It was the second general election held that year. This election was held just seven months after the previous general election, held in February 1974, had led to a hung parliament. Following the inconclusive nature of coalition talks between the Conservatives and other parties such as the Liberals and the disaffiliated Ulster Unionists, the Labour Leader Harold Wilson had gone on to form a minority government. After 8 months, Wilson felt he had demonstrated enough progress to win a majority, and called a second election. It was also the first year in which two general elections had been held in the same year since 1910; and the first time that two general elections had been held less than a year apart from each other since the 1923 and 1924 elections, which took place 10 months apart.

Across the United Kingdom, the election resulted in a narrow victory for the Labour Party, led by Prime Minister Harold Wilson, which won a wafer-thin majority of three seats, the narrowest in modern British history. In Wales, the election saw the Labour party win the most votes and seats in Wales. However, the only seat change that occurred in Wales was in Carmarthen wherein Plaid Cymru won its third seat from the Labour Party.

Otherwise, the Conservative Party retained its eight seats of Cardiff North West, Pembrokeshire, Barry, Cardiff North, West Flintshire, Denbigh, Conway and Monmouth.

Liberal Party retained Cardiganshire and Montgomeryshire, but with a minor decreased in vote share in Wales.

== Candidates ==
Below is a table summarising the candidates of the October 1974 general election in Wales.

Affiliation	Candidates
Labour Party	36
Conservative and Unionist Party	36
Liberal Party	36
Plaid Cymru	36
Communist Party of Great Britain	3
British Candidate	1 (Note: Candidate Edward B. Jones stood in Carmarthen.)
Marxist-Leninist Party (England)	1 (Note: Candidate B.C.D. Harris stood in Cardiff South East.)
Workers Revolutionary Party	1 (Note: Candidate J. Bevan stood in Aberavon.)
Total	150

== Results ==
Below is a table summarising the results of the October 1974 general election in Wales.

Party	Seats					Aggregate votes		
Party	Total	Gains	Losses	Net	Of total (%)	Total	Of total (%)	Change (%)
Labour	23	0	1	▼1	63.9	761,447	49.5	▲2.7
Conservative	8	0	0	Steady	22.2	367,230	23.9	▼2.0
Liberal	2	0	0	Steady	5.6	239,057	15.5	▼0.5
Plaid Cymru	3	1	0	▲1	8.3	166,321	10.8	Steady
Communist	0	0	0	Steady	—	2,941	0.2	▼0.1
Workers Revolutionary	0	0	0	Steady	—	427	0.0	Steady
British Candidate	0	New			—	342	0.0	New
Marxist-Leninist (England)	0	New			—	75	0.0	New
Blank and invalid votes						2,142	—	—
Total	36			0	100.0	1,537,840 (Note: All valid votes excluding spoiled votes.)	100.0	0.0
Registered voters, and turnout						2,008,284	76.6	▼3.4

Popular vote
Labour	49.5%
Conservative	23.9%
Liberal	15.5%
Plaid Cymru	10.8%
Other	0.2%

Parliament seats
Labour	63.9%
Conservative	22.2%
Plaid Cymru	8.3%
Liberal	5.6%

== See also ==
- October 1974 United Kingdom general election in England
- October 1974 United Kingdom general election in Scotland
- October 1974 United Kingdom general election in Northern Ireland
- List of MPs for constituencies in Wales (October 1974–1979)
