= Mercy (game) =

Hand game of strength and endurance

Mercy is a game of strength, skill, endurance, and pain tolerance popular in Britain, Canada, Pakistan, India, the United States, and elsewhere. The game is played by two players who grasp each other's hands (with interlocked fingers). The aim is to twist the opponent's hands or bend their fingers until the opponent surrenders.

== Rules ==
Two players face each other and join hands, each player's left hand interlocking fingers and thumbs with the opposing player's right hand. But one of the most important rules is to not inflict pain by straining their wrist. On the word "go", each player attempts to bend back the opponent's hand and inflict pain. When a player can no longer stand the pain they declare defeat by shouting popularly "Mercy, Mercy, Uncle Mercy" (commonly mistaken for "Mercy, Mercy, Uncle Percy"), "Mercy!" (or "Peanuts!", or "scorpion", or "Pinochle" or "Uncle", depending upon what they call the game). If a player on the verge of losing the match calls for "timeout", "break", or "re grip", that player will lose the match as though they have cried "mercy!"

=== Winners ===
The winner is usually called 'The Monster', 'The Champion', 'The Fahad' but this of course depends on the players, and people from different ethnic background, decide or/choose to call it different. Most opponents do not want a rematch after facing the winners (win or lose regardless).

Sportsmanship etiquette includes the prompt release of the hand grip after defeating the opponent. Some consider the rapid twisting of the wrist to be a dangerous cheat that could result in broken wrists; others consider this maneuver to be fair. During play, players may not move their feet (some play otherwise). Rules are often agreed upon before playing.

== Strategy ==
Skilled Mercy players often use specific strategies to get their opponents into painful positions, such as twisting the arm around so that the elbow is pointed towards the neck, against the back, and then pushing up on the arm. Throwing an opponent on their back on either a desk or the floor may be used if they are too persistent. Sometimes a mercy match can end very quickly or can last for minutes.

Players with bony fingers may shift their grip to twist their opponents fingers purposefully, causing pain by digging their bony middle joints into the other players fingers. However painful this may be to the unsuspecting opponent, this may run the risk of dislocating or breaking one or both parties fingers.

The 'handlock' is a strategy mastered by those who are the best at mercy. Beware, 2 strong players could make each other's fingers numb and cause hand marks over them. Sometimes, if a person knows they will lose, they say "What's the name of this game?" to the other player. The other player may say "Mercy", signifying a win for the person who asked.

== Variations ==
- Mercy may be played one-handed.
- A stronger player may play two people at once, one on each hand.
- A player may choose to have the inner or outer grip depending on the decision between players.

=== With three or more players ===
Mercy can be played with any number of people: players form a ring and interlock fingers with the adjacent hands of the two players on either side. On "go" all players attempt to bend back the wrists of their neighbor. When a player cries "Mercy!", play ceases and that player is eliminated from the game. The remaining players rejoin hands and play resumes until only one person is left.

=== Bench Mercy ===
In another variation of Mercy, two opponents sit back-to-back on a bench, with feet against the arm rests on the far side of the bench. Both players then proceed to push each other in which standard mercy rules come into play; when one player cannot take the strain or pain any longer, they will cry "Mercy!" or the phrase at hand. One variation of this involves several people sitting in a row, and having only one person push with their back.

=== Flooring Mercy ===
The players must play with mercy but also 'floor' the other player to win. This is a test of skill, power and the ability to focus your body in different ways. This is more popular when played in the snow. Players must use the basic mercy stance. The person who says 'Mercy!' or gets floored loses the game.

== Safety ==
The game causes tissues in the hands to be twisted and can cause injuries, particularly in the case of children.

== In media ==
=== In film ===
- Major Payne, to relieve a fellow soldier's pain in Operation Eagle Claw, which Major Payne is about to share with the boy until distracted at the last second.

=== In literature ===
- Storm Trooper by Kevin Cramer (2001), page 224
- Playing Mercy by Matthew David Scott (2005)
- The Welch Sisters' memoir, The Kids Are Alright (2010), page 140
- Sarah Nichter's memoir, "Brilliant Disguise: An Ugly Story of a Beautiful Redemption" (2013), pages 3–4

=== Analogies in Christian studies ===
- "Mercy!" in Welcome Home: Meditations Along Our Way by Tom Sikes (2004)
- "Grabbing Onto Mercy" by Sarah Lawrence in LeadHer Challenge: 365 Devotionals to Encourage and Inspire Women in Their Calling from God (2011)
- "Merciful" by Marisa T. Johnson in "Yes, I Am Talking To You: Answering the Call of Christian Discipleship
- When Faith Gets Shaken by Liza Patrick Regan (2015) page 93

== See also ==
- Bloody knuckles
- Red hands
