= Red hands =

Children's game

Red hands, also known as hot hands, slapsies, or simply the hand slap game, is a children's game which can be played by two players.

One player extends their hands forward, roughly at arm's length, with the palms down. The other player's hands, also roughly at arm's length, are placed, palms up, under the first player's hands. The object of the game is for the second player to slap the back of the first player's hands before the first player can pull them away. If the slapping player misses, the players swap roles and play again.

The slapper is on offense and must act with sufficient speed, because the slappee's goal is to pull their hands away, and out of the area where the hands overlap, to avoid the slap. The slapper can only slap the hand it is underneath.

The slappee is on defense and attempts to avoid having their hands slapped, by pulling their hands away as the slapper brings their hands over to attempt a slap. However, the slappee cannot flinch too much in attempting to avoid a slap: in one variation of the game, if the slappee pulls their hands away when the slapper has not brought their hands around a designated number of times in a row (normally three), then the slappee must submit to a "free slap" by the slapper. Also, the slapper must use both hands to slap the slappee. If they do one hand, a “free slap” will be awarded.

== Variations ==
A variation of the game involves the slappee placing their hands held palms together, held out at mid-torso height; the slapper then does the same with the tips of the fingers of both players' hands around a centimetre apart, or with the tips of the middle fingers touching, and then (with just one of their hands) the slapper tries to slap the backs of the slappee's hands. You can slap the slappee's hands with just one of your hands as a strategical move.

Another variation is played as above but with one (or both) player(s) blindfolded. If both players are blindfolded, you will need someone else to make sure they start in the right positions.

Another variation is played with both players forming fists, held in front of the opponent's fists. The offensive player knocks their knuckles against the top of the defender's fist, as a more painful variant of the game. This version is sometimes called bloody knuckles, though not to be confused with other games of the same name.

== In popular culture ==
- The game is played by non-player characters in the video game The Sims 2.
- It can be played as a mini-game in the 2004 video game Leisure Suit Larry: Magna Cum Laude.
- Appears in the 1969 film Kes during a football match
- Appears in the Blur video for "Parklife" (1994)

== See also ==
- Bloody knuckles
- Mercy
- Red hand
- Slapjack
