= Casey Ribicoff =

American philanthropist and socialite (1922–2011)

- Born: Lois Ruth Mell; December 5, 1922; Chicago, Illinois, U.S.
- Died: August 22, 2011 (aged 88); New York City, U.S.
- Occupations: Socialite and philanthropist

Casey Ribicoff (born Lois Ruth Mell; December 5, 1922 – August 22, 2011) was an American philanthropist, socialite and the second wife and widow of United States Secretary of Health, Education, and Welfare and later United States Senator from Connecticut, Abraham Ribicoff. Ribicoff was the President of the ladies auxiliary of Mount Sinai Medical Center in Miami Beach, Florida and in 1963 became the first woman to be selected to serve on the hospital's board of trustees.

As a socialite, she was known as a woman of style who, after years of appearing on best-dressed lists, was inducted into the International Best-Dressed Hall of Fame in 1988. Ribicoff counted among her friends Bill Blass (of whose estate she was the principal executor).

Ribicoff also counted Nancy Kissinger, Barbara Walters, Annette de la Renta, Dominick Dunne and Tom Brokaw among her close friends.

President Jimmy Carter appointed her to the board of the Kennedy Center, a seat in which she served for twenty years.
