= 1974 Maldivian parliamentary election =

- September–October 1974
- All 54 seats in the People's Majlis; 27 seats needed for a majority
Party	Seats
Independents	46
Presidential appointees	8
This lists parties that won seats. See the complete results below.

Parliamentary elections were held in the Maldives in September and October 1974. All candidates ran as independents.

== Electoral system ==
The People's Majlis had 54 seats, of which 46 were elected and eight appointed by the President. Eight of the elected members were from Malé, with two from each of the 19 districts.

== Results ==
Party	Seats
Independents	46
Presidential appointees	8
Total	54
Source: Political Handbook of the World

== Aftermath ==
When the newly elected Majlis convened in February 1975, it re-elected Ahmed Zaki as Prime Minister. However, the following month, president Ibrahim Nasir declared a state of emergency and removed Zaki from office. The post of Prime Minister was subsequently abolished.
