= Magnet Museum =

Museum in Dortmund-Aplerbeck, Germany

Coordinates: 51°29′16″N 7°33′16″E

The Magnet Museum (German: Magnetmuseum) is a private museum in Dortmund-Aplerbeck, owned by the company Tridelta.

The exhibition provides an overview of historical and current applications of the permanent magnet in electrical engineering. In the museum, the use of permanent magnets in counters, speakers, telephones, switches, relays, clocks, measuring devices, small motors and generators are illuminated in the museum.

One focus of the collection is the history of the magnet factory of Dortmund, which was established in the 1920s.
