= Una Kroll =

British nun and missionary doctor (1925–2017)

- Born: Una Margaret Patricia Hill; 15 December 1925; London, England
- Died: 6 January 2017 (aged 91)
- Education: St Paul's Girls' School; Malvern Girls College
- Alma mater: Girton College, Cambridge
- Known for: missionary doctor, nun, priest, and campaigner for women's ordination
- Spouse: Leopold Kroll
- Children: 4
- Parent(s): George Alexander Hill; Hilda Evelyn Pediani
- Relatives: Frederick Temple (great-granduncle)

Una Margaret Patricia Kroll (nee Hill, 15 December 1925 – 6 January 2017) was a British nun, missionary doctor, priest, and campaigner for women's ordination.

== Early life ==
Kroll was born in London, and grew up in Paris, Latvia, and London. Her father, George Alexander Hill (1892–1968), was the son of a timber merchant with business interests stretching from Siberia to Persia, and a British intelligence officer in the First and Second World Wars. Her mother Hilda Evelyn (née Pediani) was the daughter of an Italian tobacco merchant who had eloped from Constantinople with the niece of Frederick Temple (an Archbishop of Canterbury) before settling in St Petersburg where the couple had seven children, the youngest of which was Hilda. Hilda Pediani worked as a spy for the British and fell for "philandering" fellow spy George Hill, with Una conceived out of wedlock, and although her father bigamously married her mother before she was born, he left before she was two years old.

Kroll was educated at St Paul's Girls' School, Malvern Girls College, and Girton College, Cambridge, from which she graduated with a degree in medicine.

== Career ==
In the October 1974 general election, she stood for Parliament in Sutton and Cheam as an independent candidate on an equal opportunities platform.

After she was widowed at the age of 61, she became a nun.

In 1997, aged 72 and serving as a deacon in a Welsh parish, she was ordained as a priest by the then Bishop of Monmouth, Dr Rowan Williams.

In 2008, she converted to Catholicism.

== Personal life ==
In 1957, she married Leopold Kroll, an American monk 25 years older than her who had brought her back to England from her work as a missionary doctor in Liberia after she fell ill. They had the first of four children in 1958, and moved to Namibia in 1959, where they became active in the anti-apartheid movement and were expelled from the country within two years.

Kroll died on 6 January 2017 at the age of 91.

== Publications ==
- The Healing Potential of Transcendental Meditation. Atlanta, GA: John Knox Press, 1974. ISBN 9780804205986, OCLC 1094821
- Flesh of My Flesh, London: Longman and Todd, 1975
- Lament for a Lost Enemy. London: SPCK, 1977. ISBN 9780281035717, OCLC 4035962
- Sexual Counselling. London: SPCK, 1980. ISBN 9780281037520, OCLC 490957151
- Trees of Life. Mowbray, 1997
- Forgive and live. London: Mowbray, 2000. ISBN 9780304706310, OCLC 42745584
- Anatomy of survival: steps on a personal journey towards healing. London: Continuum, 2001. ISBN 9780264675305, OCLC 46433530
- Living Life to the Full: A Guide to Spiritual Health in Later Years. CIP Group Ltd., 2006. ISBN 9780826480798, OCLC 62714687
- Bread Not Stones. London: Christian Alternative, 2014. ISBN 9781782798040, OCLC 907086111
