= Red-handed =

Red-handed may refer to:

== Animals ==
- Red-handed howler, New World monkey
- Red-handed tamarin, New World monkey

== Expression ==
- Caught red-handed or In flagrante delicto

== Art, entertainment, and media ==
=== Music ===
- Red Handed, one-third member of the hip hop trio 1 Life 2 Live
- "Red-Handed", an episode of the first season of the ABC Television series Once Upon a Time.

=== Podcasts ===
- RedHanded, a 2017 true crime podcast by Wondery
