= 1974 United States Senate election in Connecticut =

- November 5, 1974
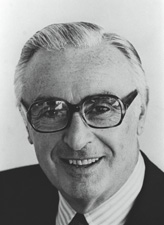

Nominee	Abraham Ribicoff	James Brannen III
Party	Democratic	Republican
Popular vote	690,820	372,055
Percentage	63.68%	34.29%
- Ribicoff: 50–60% 60–70% 70–80% Brannen: 40–50% 50–60%
U.S. senator before election
Abraham Ribicoff
Democratic
Elected U.S. Senator
Abraham Ribicoff
Democratic

The 1974 United States Senate election in Connecticut took place on November 5, 1974. Incumbent Democratic U.S. Senator Abraham Ribicoff was re-elected to a third term in office over Republican James H. Brannen III. Brannen, a state legislator and airline pilot, was the first African American nominated by either major party for statewide office in Connecticut.

== General election ==
=== Results ===
1974 United States Senate election in Connecticut
Party	Candidate	Votes	%
Democratic	Abraham Ribicoff (inc.)	690,820	63.68%
Republican	James H. Brannen III	372,055	34.29%
American Independent	Arthur F. Capozzi, Jr.	19,184	1.77%
American	Norman L. Rochon	2,682	0.25%
Write-in		117	0.02%
Total votes		1,084,858	100.00%
Democratic hold			

== See also ==
- 1974 United States Senate elections
