= October 1974 United Kingdom general election in Northern Ireland =

- 10 October 1974

All 12 Northern Ireland seats in the House of Commons
- Turnout: 67.7% (▼2.2 pp)
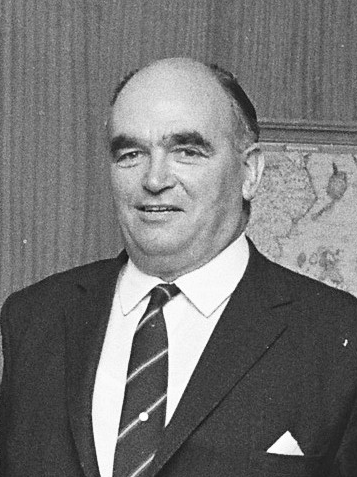

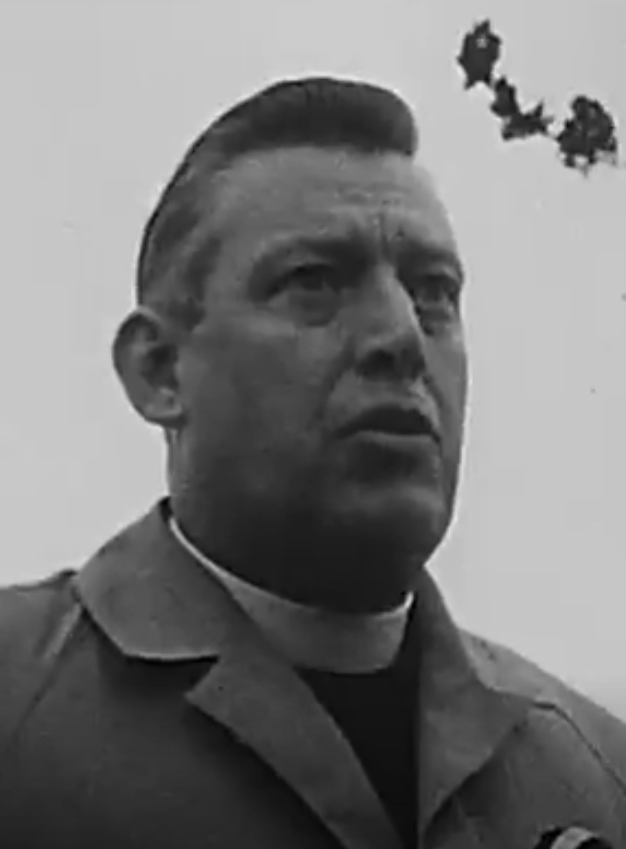
	First party	Second party
		VUPP
Leader	Harry West	William Craig
Party	UUP	Vanguard
Alliance	UUUC	UUUC
Leader since	Jan. 1974	1973
Leader's seat	Fermanagh and South Tyrone (lost seat)	Belfast East
Last election	7 seats, 32.3%	3 seats, 10.6%
Seats won	6	3
Seat change	▼1	Steady
Popular vote	256,065	92,622
Percentage	36.5%	13.1%
Swing	▲4.2 pp	▲2.5 pp
	Third party	Fourth party
	SDLP
Leader	Gerry Fitt	Ian Paisley
Party	SDLP	DUP
Alliance		UUUC
Leader since	1970	1971
Leader's seat	Belfast West	Antrim North
Last election	1 seat, 22.4%	1 seat, 8.2%
Seats won	1	1
Seat change	Steady	Steady
Popular vote	154,193	59,451
Percentage	22.0%	8.5%
Swing	▼0.4 pp	▲0.3 pp

On 10 October 1974, the October 1974 United Kingdom general election was held in Northern Ireland, to elect all 635 members of the House of Commons, with 12 constituencies being in Northern Ireland.

This was the second general election to take place in 1974, as Harold Wilson who was leading a minority government sought to secure a majority for the Labour Party. He was successful, but only by a very narrow margin, which dissipated over the course of the parliament.

In Northern Ireland, the United Ulster Unionist Council continued to support an arrangement between the Ulster Unionist Party, the Vanguard Unionist Progressive Party and the Democratic Unionist Party not to contest against each other in their joint opposition to the Sunningdale Agreement, while former Prime Minister of Northern Ireland Brian Faulkner led the new Unionist Party of Northern Ireland in favour of a coalition-based executive under the Agreement. Enoch Powell, formerly an MP for Wolverhampton South West from 1959 to February 1974, was elected for South Down. Powell had left the Conservative Party in opposition to the accession of the United Kingdom to the European Communities.

On the nationalist side, the SDLP held its seat in Belfast West, and stood aside in Fermanagh and South Tyrone, allowing for the defeat of UUP leader Harry West by Independent Nationalist Frank Maguire.

== Candidates ==
Below is a table summarising the candidates of the February 1974 general election in Northern Ireland.

Affiliation	Candidates
Social Democratic and Labour Party	9
Ulster Unionist Party	7
Alliance Party of Northern Ireland	5
Republican Clubs	5
Vanguard Progressive Unionist Party	3
Northern Ireland Labour Party	3
Democratic Unionist Party	2
Unionist Party of Northern Ireland	2
Marxist-Leninist (Ireland)	3
Independent Republican	1 (Note: Candidate Frank Maguire stood in Fermanagh and South Tyrone.)
Independent Unionist	1 (Note: Stanley McMaster stood in Belfast South.)
Volunteer Political Party	1 (Note: Chiarman Ken Gibson stood in Belfast West.)
Independent	1 (Note: Candidate Richard Foster stood in Londonderry.)
Total	43

== Results ==
Party	Seats					Aggregate Votes		
Party	Total	Gains	Losses	Net	Of total (%)	Total	Of total (%)	Change (%)
UUP	6	0	1	▼1	50.0	256,065	36.5	▲4.2
SDLP	1	0	0	Steady	8.3	154,193	22.0	▼0.4
Vanguard	3	0	0	Steady	25.0	92,622	13.1	▲2.5
DUP	1	0	0	Steady	8.3	59,451	8.5	▲0.3
Alliance	0	0	0	Steady	—	44,644	6.4	▲3.2
Ind. Republican	1	1	0	▲1	8.3	32,795	4.7	▲3.9
Republican Clubs	0	0	0	Steady	—	21,633	3.1	▲1.0
Unionist Party NI	0	0	0	Steady	—	20,454	2.9	▼10.2 (Note: Comparison with the Pro-Assembly Unionists.)
NI Labour	0	0	0	Steady	—	11,539	1.6	▼0.6
Ind. Unionist	0	Did not stand in Feb. 1974			—	4,982	0.7	—N/a
Volunteer	0	New			—	2,690	0.4	New
Marxist–Leninist	0	New			—	540	0.1	New
Independent	0	0	0	Steady	—	846	0.1	▼0.1
Blank and invalid votes						7,805	—	—
Total	12			0	100.0	702,094 (Note: All valid votes excluding spoiled votes.)	100.0	0.0
Registered voters, and turnout						1,036,523	67.7	▼2.2

=== Popular vote ===
Popular vote
UUP	36.5%
SDLP	22.0%
Vanguard	13.1%
DUP	8.5%
APNI	6.4%
Ind. Republican	4.7%
Republican Clubs	3.1%
UPNI	2.9%
NI Labour	1.6%
Other	1.3%

Popular vote (alliances)
UUUC	58.1%
SDLP	22.0%
APNI	6.4%
Ind. Republican	4.7%
Republican Clubs	3.1%
UPNI	2.9%
NI Labour	1.6%
Other	1.3%

=== Parliament seats ===
Parliamentary seats
UUP	50.0%
Vanguard	25.0%
SDLP	8.3%
DUP	8.3%
Ind. Republican	8.3%

Parliamentary seats
UUUC	83.3%
SDLP	8.3%
Ind. Republican	8.3%

== MPs elected ==
Constituency	Party	MP
Antrim North	DUP	Ian Paisley
Antrim South	UUP	James Molyneaux
Armagh	UUP	Harold McCusker
Belfast East	Vanguard	William Craig
Belfast North	UUP	John Carson
Belfast South	Vanguard	Robert Bradford
Belfast West	SDLP	Gerry Fitt
Down North	UUP	Jim Kilfedder
Down South	UUP	Enoch Powell
Fermanagh and South Tyrone	Ind. Nationalist	Frank Maguire
Londonderry	UUP	William Ross
Mid Ulster	Vanguard	John Dunlop

== See also ==
- October 1974 United Kingdom general election in England
- October 1974 United Kingdom general election in Scotland
- October 1974 United Kingdom general election in Wales
