= Irish Civil Rights Association =

The Irish Civil Rights Association was a political organisation active in both Ireland and Britain.

The organisation was founded in Dublin in December 1972. It advocated phased withdrawal of British troops from Northern Ireland, the end of internment and an amnesty for political prisoners in the North.

The British section of the organisation stood seven candidates in the October 1974 general election. This was opposed by the majority of the body, and the British section was expelled.
