= 1974 Sioux Falls mayoral election =

- April 9, 1974; April 23, 1974

Candidate	Rick Knobe	Mike Schirmer	Dean R. Sheffield
Party	Nonpartisan	Nonpartisan	Nonpartisan
First round	2,889; 20.69%	6,120; 43.83%	2,887; 20.68%
Runoff	8,864; 50.67%	8,447; 48.80%	Eliminated
Mayor before election
Mike Schirmer
Nonpartisan
Elected mayor
Rick Knobe
Nonpartisan

The 1974 Sioux Falls mayoral election took place on April 23, 1974, following a primary election on April 9, 1974. Incumbent Mayor Mike Schirmer, who was first elected in a 1968 special election and re-elected unopposed in 1969, ran for re-election. He placed first in the primary with 44 percent of the vote. Rick Knobe, a 27-year-old radio talk show host, narrowly placed second in the primary with 21 percent of the vote, defeating customer service representative Dean Sheffield by 2 votes. In the general election, Knobe narrowly defeated Schirmer with 51 percent of the vote.

== Primary election ==
=== Candidates ===
- Mike Schirmer, incumbent Mayor
- Rick Knobe, radio talk show host
- Dean R. Sheffield, customer service representative
- John C. Sprecher, apartment building owner and manager
- Dwight Gaut, high school senior

=== Results ===
1974 Sioux Falls mayoral primary election
Party	Candidate	Votes	%
Nonpartisan	Mike Schirmer (inc.)	6,120	43.83%
Nonpartisan	Rick Knobe	2,889	20.69%
Nonpartisan	Dean R. Sheffield	2,887	20.68%
Nonpartisan	John C. Sprecher	1,795	12.86%
Nonpartisan	Dwight Gaut	271	1.94%
Total votes		13,962	100.00%

== General election ==
=== Results ===
1974 Sioux Falls mayoral runoff election
Party	Candidate	Votes	%
Nonpartisan	Rick Knobe	8,864	51.20%
Nonpartisan	Mike Schirmer (inc.)	8,447	48.80%
Total votes		17,311	100.00%
