= Abraham Ribicoff =

American politician (1910–1998)

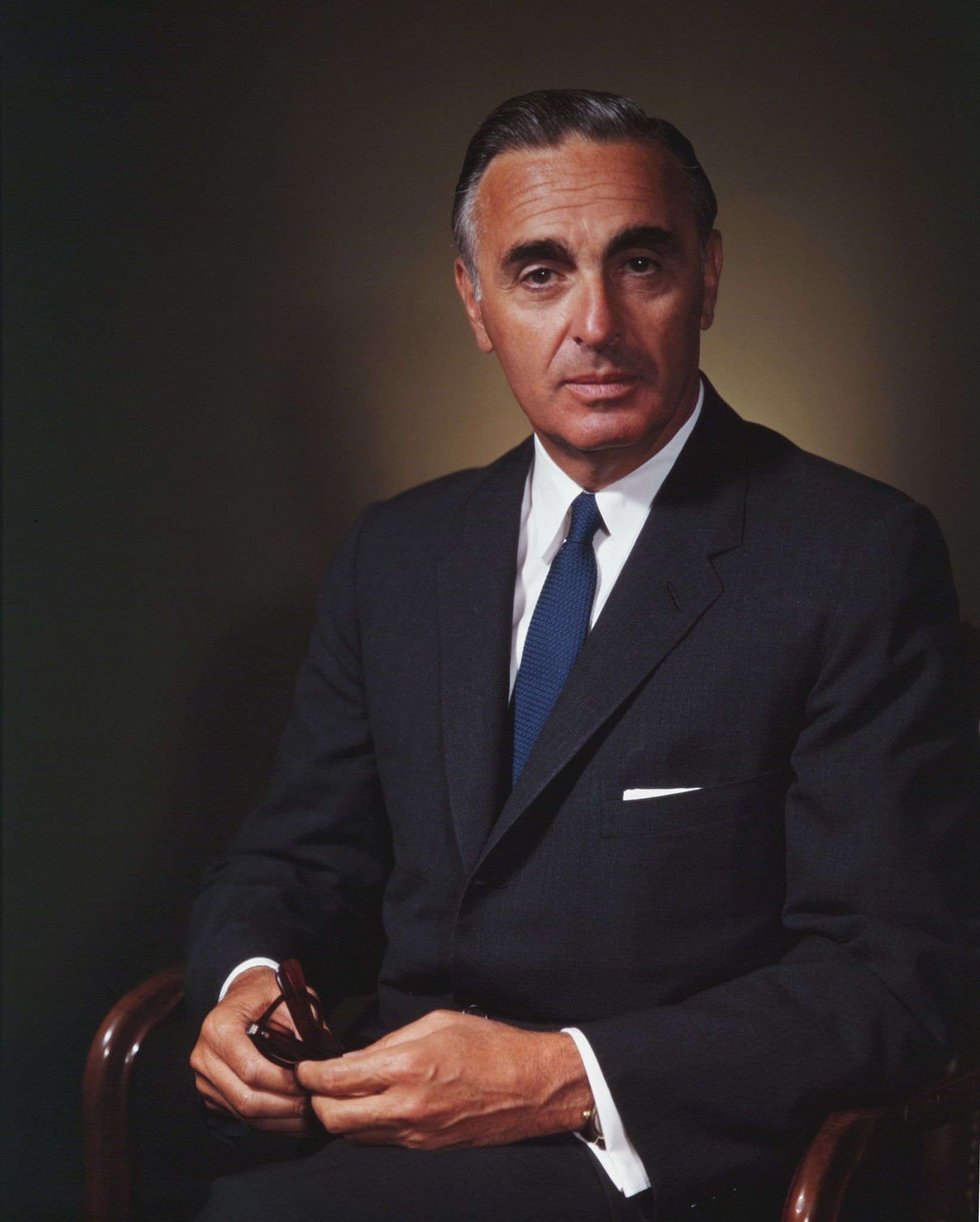
- Ribicoff in 1963

Chair of the Senate Governmental Affairs Committee
- In office December 31, 1974 – January 3, 1981
- Preceded by: Sam Ervin
- Succeeded by: William Roth

United States Senator from Connecticut
- In office January 3, 1963 – January 3, 1981
- Preceded by: Prescott Bush
- Succeeded by: Chris Dodd

4th United States Secretary of Health, Education, and Welfare
- In office January 21, 1961 – July 13, 1962
- President: John F. Kennedy
- Preceded by: Arthur Flemming
- Succeeded by: Anthony J. Celebrezze

80th Governor of Connecticut
- In office January 5, 1955 – January 21, 1961
- Lieutenant: Charles Jewett; John Dempsey
- Preceded by: John Davis Lodge
- Succeeded by: John Dempsey

Member of the U.S. House of Representatives from Connecticut's 1st district
- In office January 3, 1949 – January 3, 1953
- Preceded by: William J. Miller
- Succeeded by: Thomas J. Dodd

Member of the Connecticut House of Representatives from the Hartford district
- In office 1938–1942 Serving with Albert Carignan (1938–1940), Ernest Racicot (1940–1942)
- Preceded by: Ernest Racicot; Thomas Leavy
- Succeeded by: Harold Conroy; Rene Dupuis

Personal details
- Born: Abraham Alexander Ribicoff; April 9, 1910 New Britain, Connecticut, U.S.
- Died: February 22, 1998 (aged 87) New York City, New York, U.S.
- Party: Democratic
- Spouses: Ruth Siegel (m. 1931; died 1972); Casey Mell (m. 1972)
- Education: New York University; University of Chicago (LLB)

Abraham Alexander Ribicoff (April 9, 1910 – February 22, 1998) was an American politician from the U.S. state of Connecticut. A member of the Democratic Party, he represented Connecticut in the United States House of Representatives and Senate and was the 80th governor of Connecticut and secretary of health, education, and welfare in President John F. Kennedy's cabinet. He was Connecticut's first and to date only Jewish governor.

== Early life ==
Abraham Alexander Ribicoff was born on April 9, 1910, in New Britain, Connecticut, to Ashkenazi Jewish immigrants from Poland, Samuel Ribicoff, a factory worker, and Rose Sable Ribicoff. He had a brother named Irving. He graduated from New Britain Senior High School. Ribicoff's relatively poor parents valued education and insisted that all his earnings from part-time boyhood jobs go toward his future schooling. After high school, he worked for a year at a nearby zipper factory of the G. E. Prentice Company to earn additional funds for college. Ribicoff enrolled at New York University in 1928, then transferred to the University of Chicago after the Prentice Company made him the Chicago office manager. While in Chicago, Ribicoff coped with school and work schedules and was permitted to enter the university's law school before finishing his bachelor's degree. Still a student, he married Ruth Siegel on June 28, 1931; they had two children. Ribicoff served as editor of The University of Chicago Law Review in his third year and received an LLB cum laude in 1933, being admitted to the Connecticut bar the same year. After practicing law in the office of a Hartford lawyer, Ribicoff set up his practice, first in Kensington and later in Hartford.

== Early political career ==
Having become interested in politics, Ribicoff began as a member of the Connecticut House of Representatives, serving in that body from 1938 to 1942. From 1941 to 1943, and again from 1945 to 1947, he was the judge of Hartford Police Court. During his political career, Ribicoff was a protégé of John Moran Bailey, the powerful chairman of the Democratic Party of Connecticut.

=== U.S. Representative ===
Ribicoff was elected as a Democrat to the 81st and 82nd Congresses, serving from 1949 to 1953. During that time, he served on the Foreign Affairs Committee, a position usually reserved for members with more seniority, and was a mostly loyal supporter of the foreign and domestic policies of President Harry S. Truman's administration. Generally liberal in his outlook, he surprised many by opposing a $32 million appropriation for the construction of a dam in Enfield, Connecticut, arguing that the money was better spent on military needs and foreign policy initiatives such as the Marshall Plan.

In 1952, he made an unsuccessful bid for election to fill a vacancy in the United States Senate, losing to Prescott Bush.

=== Governor of Connecticut ===
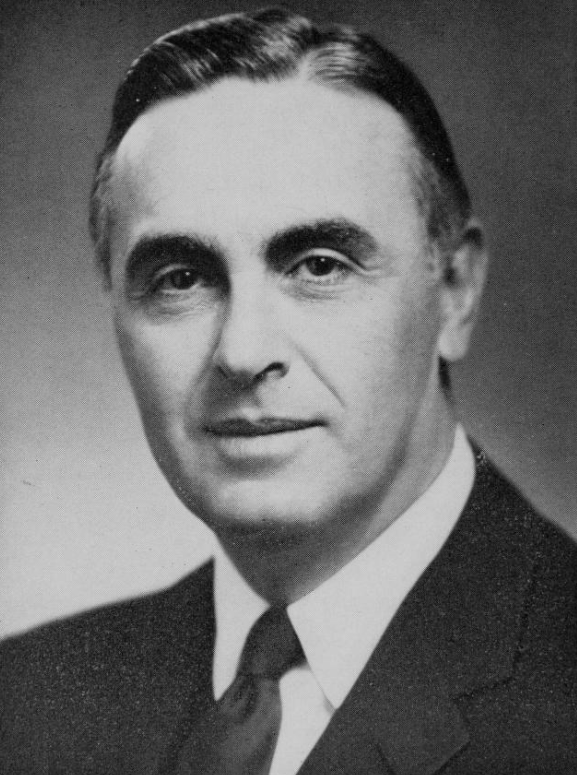
Ribicoff as governor.

After returning to his legal practice for two years, he ran for governor against incumbent Republican John Davis Lodge, winning the election with 49.5% and by just over three thousand votes. As governor (1955–1961), Ribicoff soon faced the challenge of rebuilding his state in the wake of devastating floods that occurred in the late summer and fall of 1955, and he successfully led bipartisan efforts to aid damaged areas. Ribicoff then successfully argued for increased state spending on schools and welfare programs. He also supported an amendment to the state constitution that enhanced the governing powers of local municipalities. Easily reelected in 1958, Ribicoff had by now become active on the national political scene. A longtime friend of Massachusetts Senator John F. Kennedy, Ribicoff had nominated his fellow New Englander for vice president at the 1956 Democratic National Convention and was one of the first public officials to endorse Kennedy's presidential campaign.

=== Secretary of Health, Education and Welfare ===
When Kennedy became president in 1961, he offered Ribicoff his choice of cabinet posts in the new administration. He reportedly declined the position of attorney general for fear that he might create needless controversy within the emerging Civil Rights Movement because he was Jewish, and he instead chose to be secretary of health, education, and welfare (HEW). Although he managed to secure a revision of the 1935 Social Security Act that liberalized requirements for Aid to Dependent Children, Ribicoff was unable to gain approval for the administration's Medicare and school aid bills. Eventually, he tired of attempting to manage the department, whose very size made it, in his opinion, unmanageable.

Ribicoff reflected that he had sought out the position of HEW Secretary mainly out of concern for education and "realized that the problems of health and welfare were so overriding that education was relegated to the back burner" during his tenure.

== United States Senate ==
He was finally elected to the United States Senate in 1962, replacing retiring incumbent Prescott Bush by defeating Republican nominee Horace Seely-Brown with 51% of the vote. He served in the Senate from January 3, 1963, until January 3, 1981.

Lyndon B. Johnson succeeded Kennedy as president when the latter was assassinated in 1963. Ribicoff supported Johnson at first but eventually turned against the Vietnam War and the president's management of it, believing that it drained badly needed resources away from domestic programs.

Ribicoff allied with consumer advocate Ralph Nader in creating the Motor Vehicle Highway Safety Act of 1966, which created the National Highway Traffic Safety Administration. The agency was responsible for many new safety standards on cars. These standards were questionable because up until then, the emphasis had always been put on the driver. In response, Ribicoff stated that:

The driver has many faults. He is negligent; he is careless; he is reckless. We understand that... I think it will be the millennium if you will ever get a situation where the millions and millions of drivers will all be perfect. They will always be making errors and making mistakes.

At the 1968 Democratic National Convention, during a speech nominating George McGovern, his senatorial colleague from South Dakota, he went off-script, saying, "And with George McGovern as President of the United States, we wouldn't have to have Gestapo tactics in the streets of Chicago." Many conventioneers, having been appalled by the response of the Chicago police to the ongoing anti-war demonstrations, broke into applause. Television cameras focused on the indignant reaction of Chicago Mayor Richard J. Daley. Ribicoff spent the remaining years of his Senate career fighting for such issues as school integration, welfare and tax reform, and consumer protection.

During the 1972 Democratic National Convention, presidential nominee George McGovern offered Ribicoff the Democratic vice-presidential nomination, but he declined and it eventually went to Senator Thomas Eagleton. After Eagleton withdrew, McGovern asked Ribicoff (among others) to take Eagleton's place. He again refused, publicly stating that he had no ambitions for higher office. McGovern eventually chose Sargent Shriver as his running mate. Later in 1972, following the death of his wife, Ribicoff married Lois Mell Mathes, who became known as "Casey".

During his time in the Senate, Ribicoff was chairman of the Committee on Government Operations (94th and 95th Congresses) and its successor committee, the Committee on Governmental Affairs (95th and 96th Congresses).

Future U.S. Senator Joe Lieberman worked in Ribicoff's Senate office as a summer intern and met his first wife, Betty Haas, there.

In 1978, Ribicoff's niece Gail Rubin was shot and killed in the Coastal Road massacre in Israel by Palestinian militants. Ribicoff denounced her killing as "an indefensible act of terrorism that deserves universal condemnation." In 1980, Ribicoff's niece Sarai Ribicoff, a reporter for the Los Angeles Herald Examiner, was shot and killed during a robbery in Venice, California.

On May 3, 1979, Ribicoff announced his intention to retire at the end of his third term. President Jimmy Carter released a statement crediting Ribicoff with having "compiled a distinguished career of public service that can serve as a model of decency, compassion, and ability."

== Later life ==
In 1981, Ribicoff fulfilled his pledge to retire from the Senate and took a position as special counsel in the New York law firm of Kaye Scholer LLP and divided his time between homes in Cornwall Bridge, Connecticut, and New York. He was co-chairman of the 1988 Base Realignment and Closure Commission.

Having suffered in his later years from the effects of Alzheimer's disease, he died in 1998 at the Hebrew Home for the Aged in Riverdale in The Bronx, New York City, and is interred at Cornwall Cemetery in Cornwall, Connecticut.

== See also ==
- List of Jewish members of the United States Congress
- List of Jewish United States Cabinet members

U.S. House of Representatives
| Preceded by William J. Miller | Member of the U.S. House of Representatives from Connecticut's 1st congressional district 1949–1953 | Succeeded by Thomas J. Dodd |
Party political offices
| Preceded by Brien McMahon | Democratic nominee for U.S. Senator from Connecticut (Class 3); 1952 | Succeeded by Thomas J. Dodd |
| Preceded by Chester Bowles | Democratic nominee for Governor of Connecticut; 1954, 1958 | Succeeded by John Dempsey |
| Preceded by Thomas J. Dodd | Democratic nominee for U.S. Senator from Connecticut (Class 3); 1962, 1968, 1974 | Succeeded by Chris Dodd |
Political offices
| Preceded by John Davis Lodge | Governor of Connecticut; 1955–1961 | Succeeded by John Dempsey |
| Preceded by Arthur Flemming | United States Secretary of Health, Education, and Welfare; 1961–1962 | Succeeded by Anthony J. Celebrezze |
U.S. Senate
| Preceded by Prescott Bush | U.S. Senator (Class 3) from Connecticut; 1963–1981; Served alongside: Thomas J. Dodd, Lowell P. Weicker Jr. | Succeeded by Chris Dodd |
| Preceded by Sam Ervin | Chair of the Senate Governmental Affairs Committee; 1974–1981 | Succeeded by William Roth |
| New office | Chair of the Senate Practices and Procedures Study Group; 1982–1983; Served alongside: James B. Pearson | Position abolished |
