= 1910 United Kingdom general election =

There were two general elections held in the United Kingdom in 1910:

- January 1910 United Kingdom general election
- December 1910 United Kingdom general election
