= Boys' toys and games =

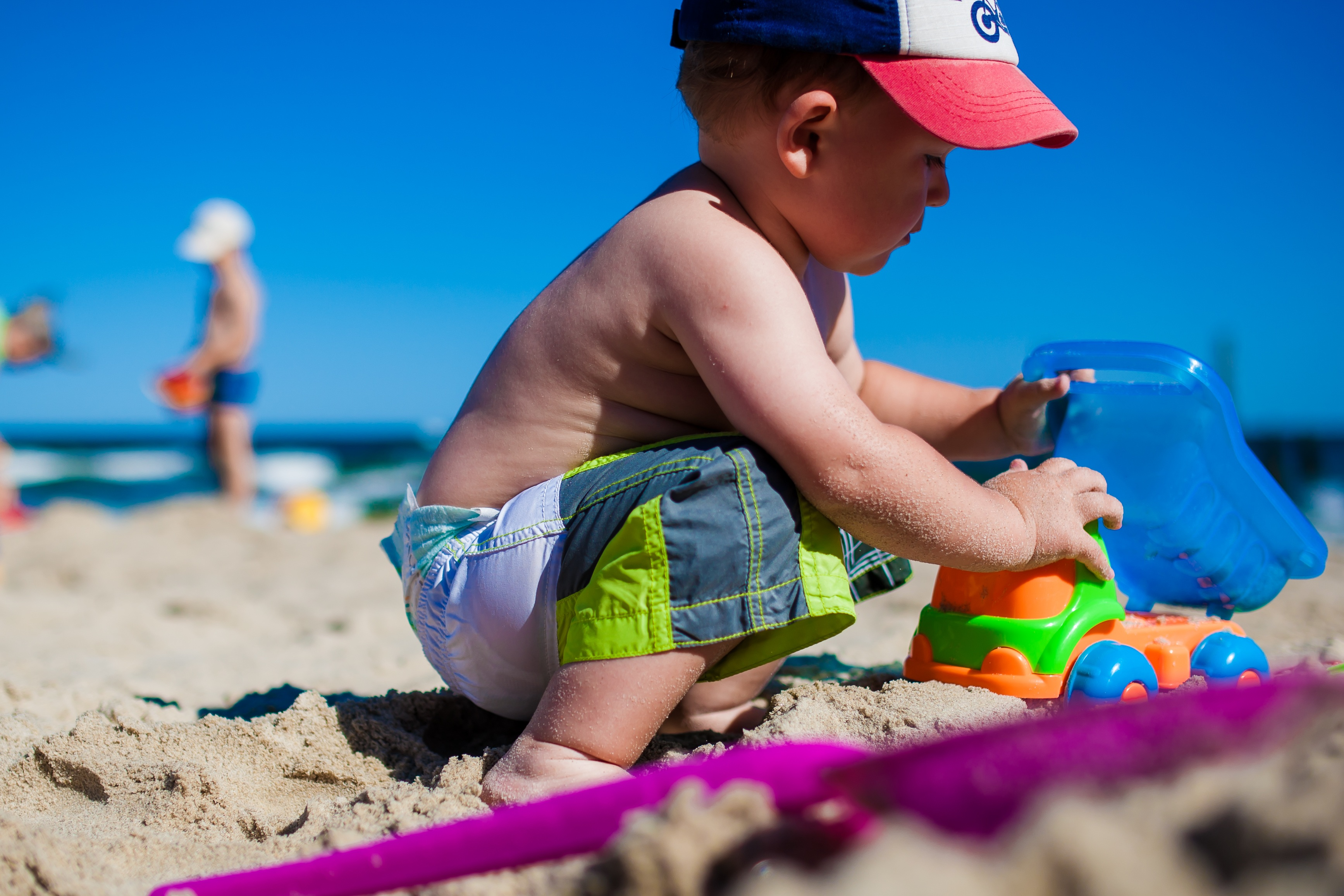
A young boy playing with a toy dump truck at the beach.

Boys' toys and games, as opposed to girls' toys and games, are a subset of toys and games that are designed to appeal to male children.

== Background ==
Research suggests that there may be some biological predispositions at play that drive toy preferences. Kim Wallen, a psychologist at Yerkes National Primate Research Center, found in her study that male rhesus monkeys played with model dump trucks and other wheeled toys, over plush dolls.

Infant boys and girls as young as 9 months old have been found to display stereotypical toy preferences, suggesting that there are biological and environmental factors which appear very early in development. A City, University of London study found that in children aged 9 to 32 months, boys preferred balls and toy cars, and that the preference increased with age.

In a 2018 study done by developmental psychologist Lauren Spinner, the effects of images of children playing with stereotypic or counter-stereotypic toys was analyzed on kids age 4 to 7 years old. After the subjects were shown one of the images, they were asked to pick whether a boy or girl would play with a selection of toys such as a baby doll, jet fighter, tool kit, tea set, etc. Children who were shown the counter-stereotypic photos were more open to the idea of boys and girls possibly liking toys usually geared toward the opposite gender. However, seeing the photos did not change the child's own opinions about which toys they would select.

== Themes ==
=== Machinery and technology ===
Many toys based on themes such as machinery and technology are marketed mainly to boys.

These toys can also often blur the lines of the man-machine dichotomy, with action figures that represent males as machines on a range from technologically enhanced humans to cyborgs to sentient robots. One product line by Revell called Beast Machines even depicted figures which had humanoid heads and torsos, but tanks from the waist down. Tomy's Z-Knights toys introduced terms related to computer technology, in effect of masculinizing them by using humanoid robot characters named like Megahertz, CPU, and Kilabyte (kilobyte). The very popular Transformers line, Power Rangers (American adaptation of Super Sentai) and related media depicted sentient robots, almost all of which were portrayed as male, which could transform into various vehicles and animals.

This interaction with machinery persists into adulthood. Cultural phenomenon like car races such as NASCAR promote similar ideas of masculinity, competition, and rough play that the stereotypical boy's toy might also encourage.

== In entertainment and advertising ==
In a study done by sociologist Elizabeth Sweet, the history of toys marketed by gender was analyzed in Sears catalogs from the 20th century. In this study, advertisements published from the 1920s to the 1950s often promoted stereotypical roles of men and women to boys and girls.

During the Reagan Administration, the regulations limiting advertisers’ ability to reach children became dismantled. Shows such as My Little Pony and Transformers were created to both entertain and advertise simultaneously – a revolutionary change for the toy business. According to professor of education Diane Levin, this pattern for companies escalated so as by December 1985, 9/10 popular children's toys were associated with television shows.

In 2012, sociologist Carol Auster analyzed Disney's retail website and realized toys were specifically listed as “girl” or “boy” toys. Currently, Disney cross-lists its toys under each section yet less than 23% toys appeared on both lists with the majority cross-listed colors more typically associated with boys perpetuating masculinity as the default of gender-neutral children's toys.

== Toys ==
Traditional toys for boys include:

- Action figures
- Blaster toys
- BB guns
- Construction sets
- Model cars
- Radio controlled model cars, boats, and other vehicles
- Slingshots
- Toy robots and robot dogs
- Toy soldiers
- Toy tools
- Toy train
- Toy trucks

== Games ==
Traditional games played by boys include:

- Bloody knuckles
- Hacky sack
- Hoop rolling
- Knife games
- Mumblety-peg
- Skateboarding

== See also ==
- Children's games
