= Bloody knuckles =

Hand game of pain endurance

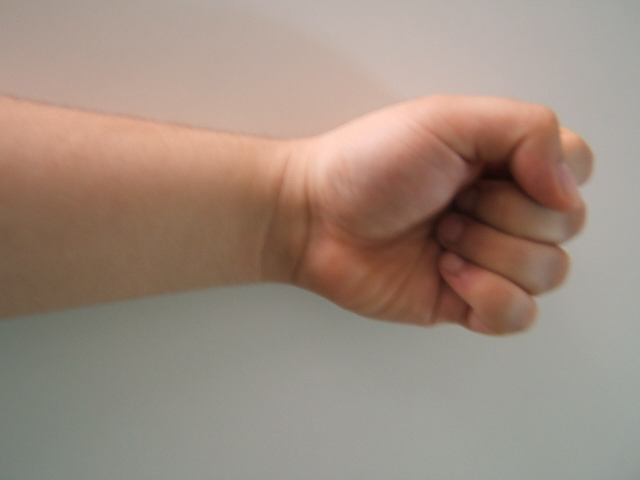
The game is played with both players forming fists

Bloody knuckles is a game in which each player makes a fist with the thumb wrapped around the other fingers. Then each fist punches the other's fist. Players who flinch are out of the game. Whoever lasts the longest before quitting wins the game. The game is played until someone's knuckles are bleeding or they quit due to excessive pain. Variations include simultaneous or alternate punching, and games in which the strike is the loser's punishment/winner's privilege. In the first two ways of playing the game, violence, though essentially consensual, is inherent, not a risk. Almost all ways of playing are dangerous, carrying the risk of injury, scarring, and damage to one's bones and hand. The point is to make them bleed.

The rules of this game are simple: each combatant makes a fist and then the fists punch each other. You flinch, you lose. Whoever lasts the longest before quitting wins.

"Bloody knuckles" may refer to any game where the loser is punished: punched, slapped, or struck with an object. For example, in the card game, the winner strikes the loser's hand with the deck of cards.

One of the most famous nonsanctioned playground games is bloody knuckles...a simple game that tests your speed, your strength, and most important, your tolerance for pain. Two kids stand facing each other with knuckles touching. Then one tries to whack the other's knuckles as hard as he can. Next, the other kid goes. Back and forth, whack after whack. This game goes on until one of them quits for a simple reason: the pain becomes too intense.

— Jud Wilhite, pastor

There are different variations of the game. One variation, quarters, where two players use a coin, such as a quarter, that is spun around a flat surface (usually a table). The players continue to keep it spinning by flicking it with their fingers. The other player must touch it without causing it to stop spinning and fall on the heads or tails side. Then the person who spun the coin first tries to touch it next. This turn-taking continues until the coin falls. Whichever player's touch causes the spinning coin to stop and fall down is considered the loser, and they must put their knuckles on the playing surface. Then, the winner puts their thumb on the coin and forcefully pushes it across the table onto the loser's exposed knuckles.

Another version includes spinning a coin on a flat surface, then grabbing it with the pad of the player's thumb with the thumbs crossed like an x. If the player grabs the coin between the thumbs they rotate spinning until one does not grab the coin. When the player does not grab the coin, the opponent forcefully slides the coin into the loser's knuckles with the knuckles flat on the surface with one arm behind if they miss the knuckles. Whoever bleeds any amount first loses.

== See also ==
- Coming of age
- Ear pull
- Knife game
- Mercy (game)
- Mumblety-peg
- Red hands
- Trading blows
- Pencil fighting
