= Knife game =

Game involving a knife and one's fingers

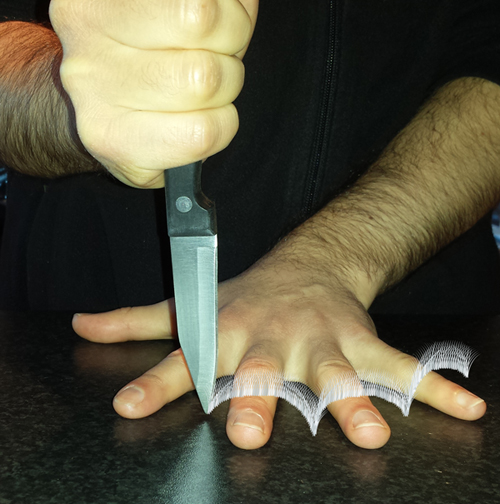
Knife game being played, with white line representing the motion of the game

The knife game, pinfinger, stabscotch, nerve, bishop, hand roulette, five finger fillet (FFF), or chicken is a game wherein, placing the palm of one's hand down on a table with fingers apart, using a knife or other sharp object, one attempts to stab back and forth between one's fingers, trying not to hit the fingers. The game is intentionally dangerous, exposing players to the risks of incision or penetration; one may play it much more safely by using another object, such as the eraser side of a pencil. In European culture, it is traditionally considered a boys' game. It appears in various media across popular culture, including Knife in the Water, Aliens, and Red Dead Redemption.

== Description ==
The knife game is a game where a player uses a knife (or other sharp object) to stab at the spaces between the fingers on their unarmed hand atop a hard surface. The game is also referred to by the names pinfinger, nerve, bishop, hand roulette, stabscotch, five finger fillet (FFF), or chicken.

== Gameplay ==
To play, the player places the palm of one hand down on a table with fingers apart. In their other hand, the player holds a knife (such as a pocket or pen knife) or other sharp object. The player then attempts to relatively quickly stab back and forth between their fingers on the unarmed hand, trying not to hit the fingers.

=== Risks ===
The game is intentionally dangerous, exposing players to the risk of injury and scarring, and, before antibiotics, an incision or penetration risked sepsis and death. A foldable blade carries the additional danger that, "as the faster you go, the more likely the blade will fold back in on itself trapping the finger of your stabbing hand."

It may be played much more safely by using another object, such as the eraser side of a pencil or a marker with its cap on.

=== Order of "stabbing" ===
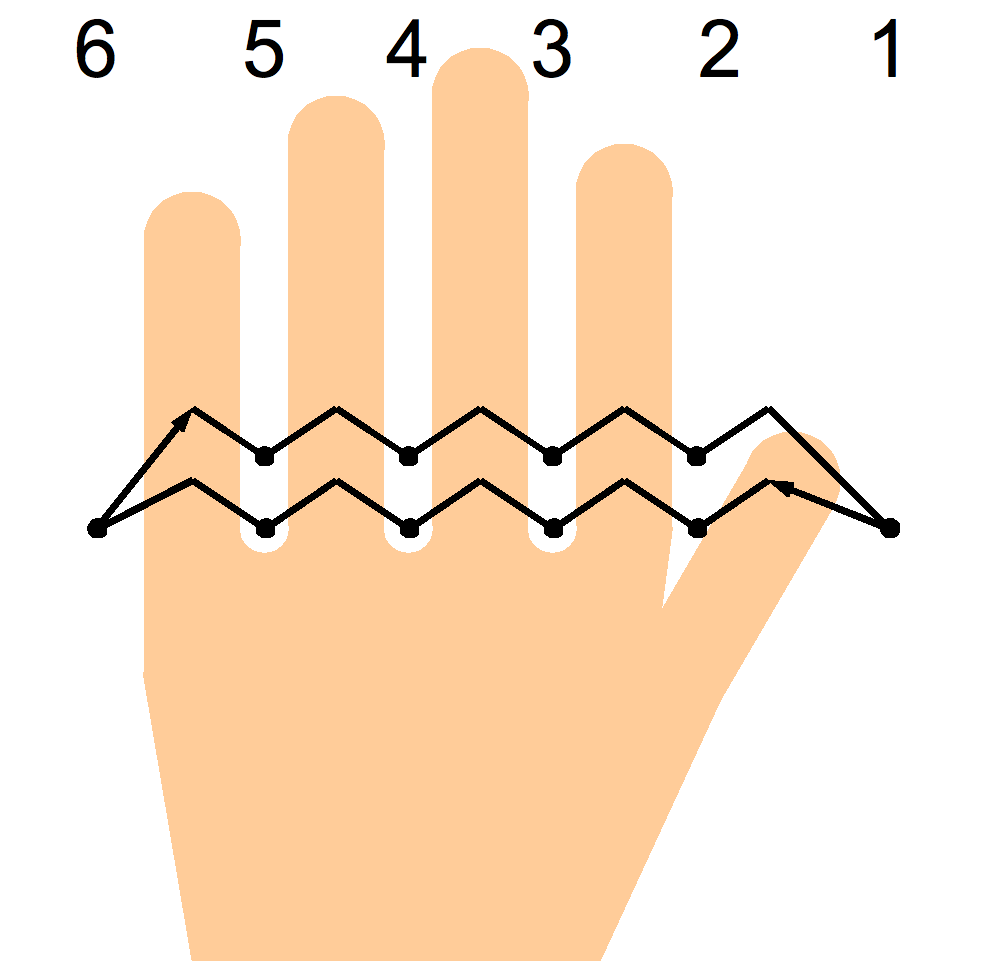
Simple order for playing the knife game

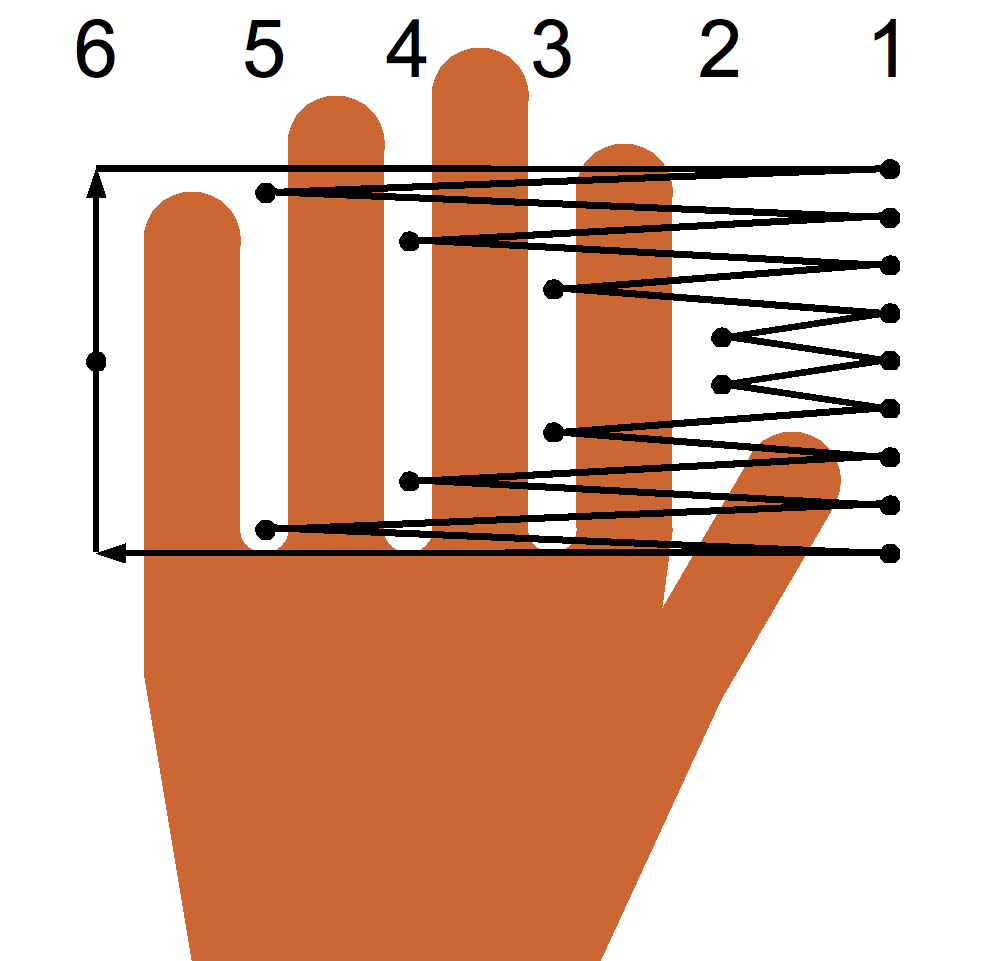
More complex order for playing the knife game

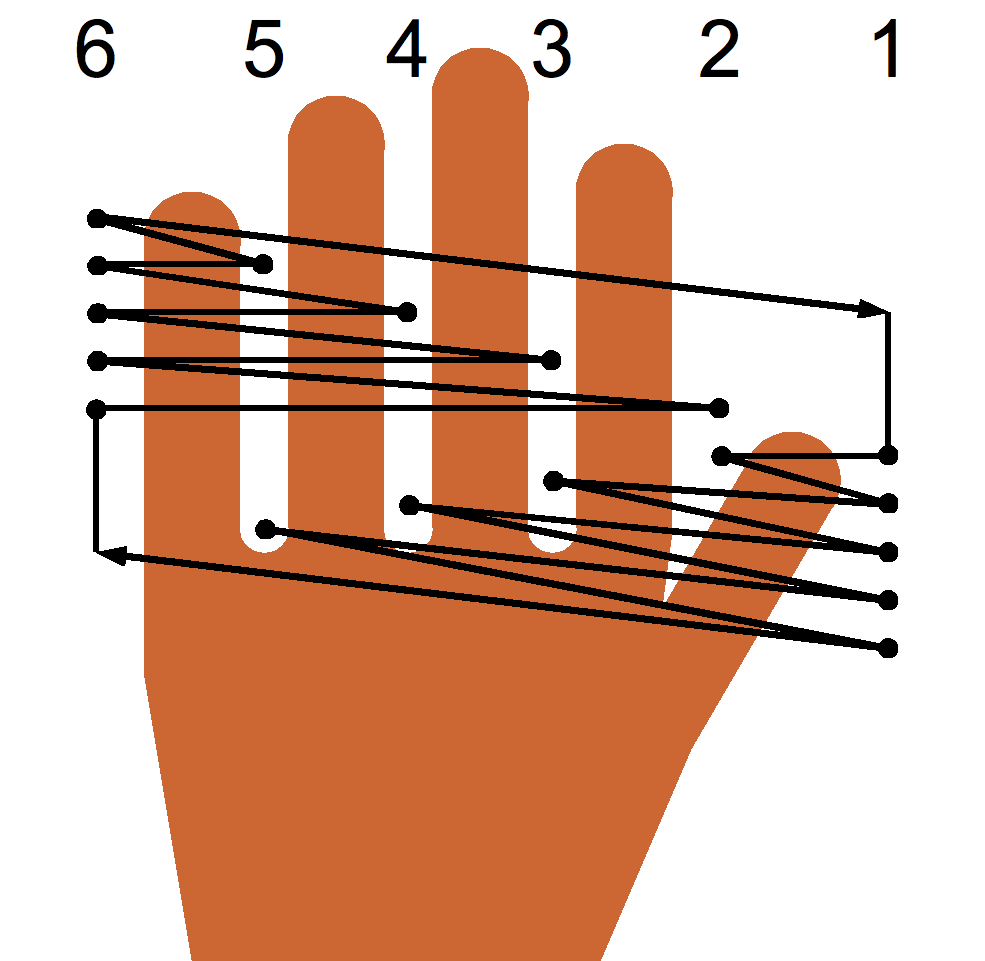
Even more complex order for playing the knife game

The order in which the spaces between the fingers are stabbed varies. In the following examples, the space numbered 1 is to the outside of the thumb, with numbering then proceeding to the space between the thumb and index finger and so forth.

The most popular version is to simply stab all the spaces in order, starting from behind the thumb to after the little finger, and back again ("In its simplest form, one would simply move as fast as one dared backwards and forwards."):

 1-2-3-4-5-6-5-4-3-2-1 (repeat).

A more complex order is also common ("Those with stronger nerves could stab according to a sequence"):

 1-2-1-3-1-4-1-5-1-6-1-5-1-4-1-3-1-2 (repeats until the end of the song)

or a more complex order:

 1-2-1-3-1-4-1-5-1-6-2-6-3-6-4-6-5-6-4-6-3-6-2-6 (etc.)

or an even more complex order:

 1-2-1-3-1-4-1-5-1-6-2-1-2-3-2-4-2-5-2-6-3-1-3-2-3-4-3-5-3-6-4-1-4-2-4-3-4-5-4-6-5-1-5-2-5-3-5-4-5-6-6-1-6-2-6-3-6-4-6-5

In Australia, the following order is used.

 1-2-1-3-1-4-1-5-1-6 (repeat)

Generally, the more complicated the order of the game, the riskier it is.

== Popular culture ==
In European culture, it is traditionally considered a boys' game, though its focus on motor coordination and dexterity is comparable to clapping games, which are traditionally girls' games.

=== In media ===
- Roman Polanski's first feature Knife in the Water (1962) may be the first film to show the game; a young hitchhiker plays the game on the deck of a sailboat.
- The movie Aliens (1986) features a scene with an android member of the crew, Bishop, who plays the "knife game" with another member of the crew.
- In 1973 Marina Abramović played the knife game in the performative art piece Rhythm 10. Each time she cut herself, she would pick up a new knife from the row of ten she had set up, and record the operation. After cutting herself ten times, she replayed the tape, listened to the sounds, and tried to repeat the same movements, attempting to replicate the mistakes, merging past and present.
- In Season 1, episode 6 of the HBO series Boardwalk Empire (2010) features a young WWI veteran, Jimmy Darmody, playing "Five Finger Fillet," and requesting the young Al Capone to join in.
- In the Sierra On-Line game Manhunter: New York (1988), one sequence requires winning the knife game in a Brooklyn bar in order to continue the winning plot.
- It is a minigame called "Wee Hand" in the 2007 video game Jackass: The Game, though here set to a one minute timer.
- Knife.Hand.Chop.Bot (2007), by the Svoltcore group, is an "interactive installation that plays with the recipient's concern about [his or her] own physical integrity."
- In the King of the Hill episode "Death and Texas," an inmate tells Peggy that the "stab a knife around your fingers" game is fun, but he doesn't believe it has a name. Peggy suggests "Stabscotch".
- In Gravity Falls, season 2 episode 15 ("Mabelcorn"), the shady gnome who trades illegal fairy dust with the group can be seen playing FFF using an acorn instead of a knife.
- The video game Work Time Fun (2005-2006) has an adaption. In the North American release, it is titled "4 Fingers".
- The knife game also appears as an unnamed gambling minigame in the 2011 id Software video game Rage.
- It appears under the title "Five Finger Fillet" as a playable minigame in both Red Dead Redemption and its sequel, which is played for in-game money.
- Stabscotch is played in the Inside No. 9 episode "The Bill".
- In Puss in Boots: The Last Wish, Puss plays the game with a party-goer at his fiesta; using his rapier instead of a knife, he straddles the weapon like a pogo stick and hops between the man's fingers. Other party-goers then take turns stabbing at Puss while he lies on his back on a spinning roulette wheel.
- In the Smiling Friends episode "Silly Samuel", Mr. Boss is seen to be playing the game, going faster and faster until the building collapses.

==== Knife game song ====
On August 31, 2011, a YouTube video entitled "The Knife Game Song" created by artist and folk singer Rusty Cage was released. Several internet users uploaded videos of themselves singing the song while playing the knife game. A new version of the song with additional lyrics entitled 'The New Knife Game Song' was later released on March 29, 2013.

The viral popularity of the song inspired an episode of the game show Unschlagbar, in which contestants were required to stab a knife between their fingers as many times as possible in thirty seconds without harming themselves. Rusty Cage, who traveled from America in order to compete, was crowned the winner and awarded €50.000 in prize money.

In 2017, Rusty Cage released a video detailing his side of the story on the knife game. He uploaded his final knife game song entitled "The Final Knife Game Song" on April 29, 2017. In January 2019, Rusty made many of his Knife Game videos private to prevent his YouTube channel from receiving strikes and potentially being terminated. He subsequently transferred many of his videos to a BitChute account for preservation. Re-uploads of the songs continue to proliferate on YouTube from other users.

== See also ==
- Bloody knuckles
- Capoeira
- Moving-knife game
- Scarification
- Self-injury
- Mumblety-peg
