= Toy =

Entertaining object primarily used by children

A red toy car from 1996.

A toy or plaything is an object that is used primarily to provide entertainment. Simple examples include toy blocks, board games, and dolls. Toys are often designed for use by children, although many are designed specifically for adults and pets. Toys can provide utilitarian benefits, including physical exercise, cultural awareness, or academic education. Additionally, utilitarian objects, especially those which are no longer needed for their original purpose, can be used as toys. Examples include children building a fort with empty cereal boxes and tissue paper spools, or a toddler playing with a broken TV remote. The term "toy" can also be used to refer to utilitarian objects purchased for enjoyment rather than need, or for expensive necessities for which a large fraction of the cost represents its ability to provide enjoyment to the owner, such as luxury cars, high-end motorcycles, gaming computers, and flagship smartphones.

Playing with toys can be an enjoyable way of training young children for life experiences. Various materials, such as wood, clay, paper, and plastic, are used to make toys. Newer forms of toys include interactive digital entertainment and smart toys. Some toys are produced primarily as collector's items and are intended for display only.

The origin of toys is prehistoric; dolls representing infants, animals, and soldiers, as well as representations of tools used by adults, are readily found at archaeological sites. The origin of the word "toy" is unknown, but it is believed that it was first used in the 14th century. Toys are mainly made for children. The oldest known doll toy is thought to be 4,000 years old.

Playing with toys is an important part of aging. Research in developmental psychology shows that play with toys supports early cognitive development, including problem-solving, memory, symbolic thinking, and understanding cause and effect. Play activities also contribute to social learning and emotional regulation in young children. Adults, on occasion, use toys to form and strengthen social bonds, teach, help in therapy, and to remember and reinforce lessons from their youth. Some adults — particularly the elderly or those recovering from trauma or cognitive decline — have used toys and structured play in therapy and recreation to support memory, emotional well-being, social bonds, and cognitive function.

A toymaker is a person or company that designs, produces, or manufactures toys.

== History ==
=== Antiquity ===
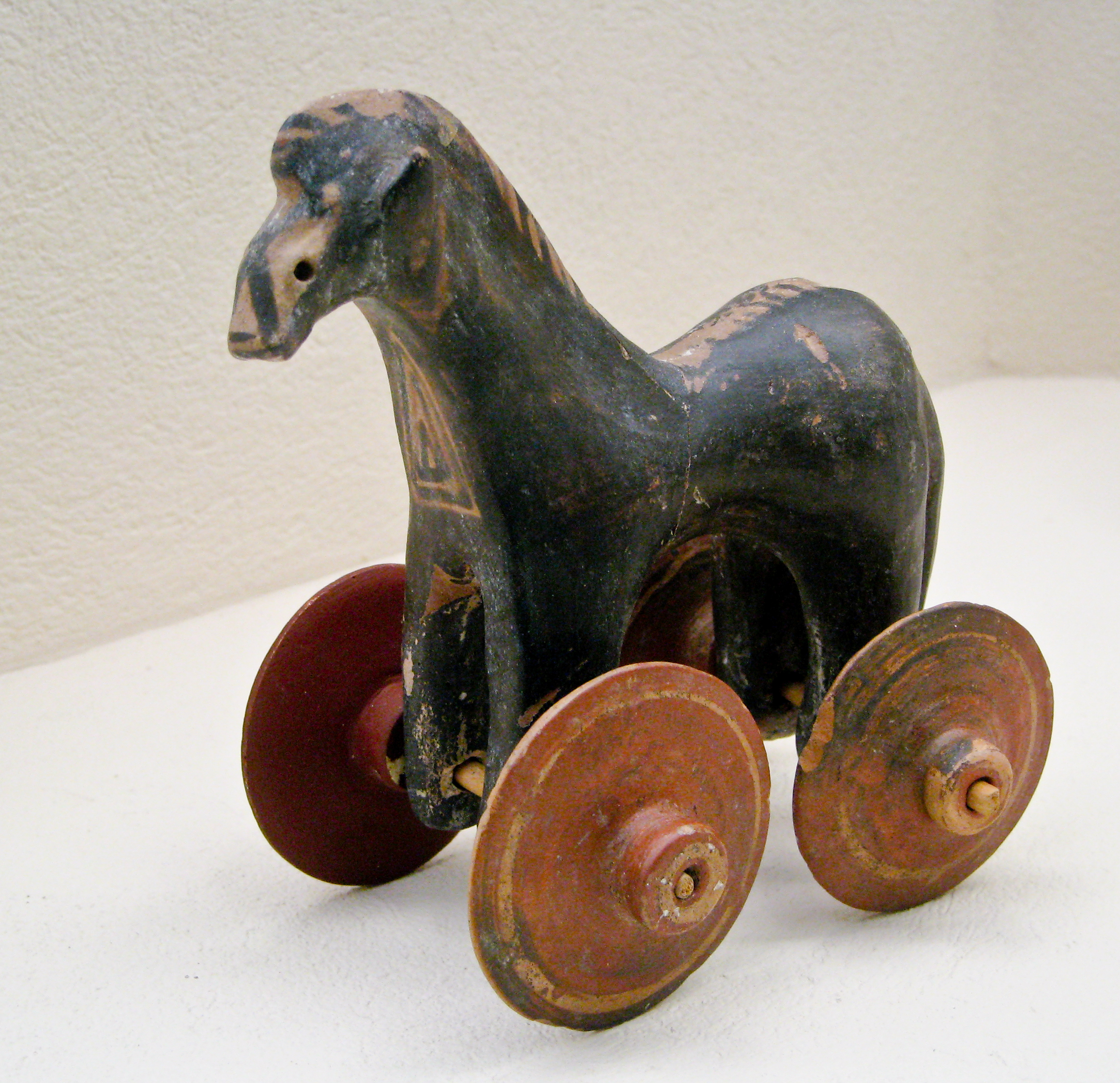
Little horse on wheels, Ancient Greek children's toy. From a tomb dating 950–900 BCE, Kerameikos Archaeological Museum, Athens

Toys and games have been retrieved from the sites of ancient civilizations, and have been mentioned in ancient literature. Toys excavated from the Indus Valley Civilization (3010–1500 BCE) include small carts, whistles shaped like birds, and toy monkeys that could slide down a string. One of the earliest examples of children's toys is a set of three stone balls found in the tomb of a four-year-old girl at Xi'an Banpo Neolithic site.

The earliest toys were made from natural materials, such as rocks, sticks, and clay. Thousands of years ago, Egyptian children played with dolls that had wigs and movable limbs, which were made from stone, pottery, and wood. However, evidence of toys in ancient Egypt is exceptionally difficult to identify with certainty in the archaeological record. Small figurines and models found in tombs are usually interpreted as ritual objects; those from settlement sites are more easily labelled as toys. These include spinning tops, balls of spring, and wooden models of animals with movable parts.

In ancient Greece and ancient Rome, children played with dolls made of wax or terracotta: sticks, bows and arrows, and yo-yos. When Greek children, especially girls, came of age, it was customary for them to sacrifice the toys of their childhood to the gods. On the eve of their wedding, young girls around fourteen would offer their dolls in a temple as a rite of passage into adulthood.

The oldest known put-together mechanical puzzle, the Ostomachion or loculus of Archimedes, also comes from ancient Greece and appeared in the 3rd century BCE. The game consisted of a square divided into 14 parts, and the aim was to create different shapes from the pieces. In Iran, "puzzle-locks" were made as early as the 17th century (CE).

=== Enlightenment Era ===
Toys became more widespread with changing Western attitudes towards children and childhood brought about by the Enlightenment. Previously, children had often been thought of as small adults, who were expected to work in order to produce the goods that the family needed to survive. As children's culture scholar Stephen Kline has argued, Medieval children were "more fully integrated into the daily flux of making and consuming, of getting along. They had no autonomy, separate statuses, privileges, special rights, or forms of social comportment that were entirely their own."

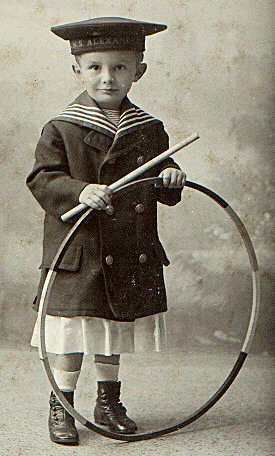
A boy with a hoop. Hoops have long been a popular toy across a variety of cultures.

As these ideas began changing during the Enlightenment Era, blowing bubbles from leftover washing-up soap became a popular pastime, as shown in the painting The Soap Bubble (1739) by Jean-Baptiste-Siméon Chardin, and other popular toys included hoops, toy wagons, kites, spinning wheels and puppets. Many board games were produced by John Jefferys in the 1750s, including A Journey Through Europe. The game was very similar to modern board games; players moved along a track with the throw of a die (a teetotum was actually used) and landing on different spaces would either help or hinder the player.

In the nineteenth century, Western values prioritized toys with an educational purpose, such as puzzles, books, cards, and board games. Religion-themed toys were also popular, including a model Noah's Ark with miniature animals and objects from other Bible scenes. With growing prosperity among the middle class, children had more leisure time on their hands, which led to the application of industrial methods to the manufacture of toys.

More complex mechanical and optical-based toys were also invented during the nineteenth century. Carpenter and Westley began to mass-produce the kaleidoscope, invented by Sir David Brewster in 1817, and had sold over 200,000 items within three months in London and Paris. The company was also able to mass-produce magic lanterns for use in phantasmagoria and galanty shows, by developing a method of mass production using a copper plate printing process. Popular imagery on the lanterns included royalty, flora, and fauna, and geographical/man-made structures from around the world. The modern zoetrope was invented in 1833 by British mathematician William George Horner and was popularized in the 1860s. Wood and porcelain dolls in miniature doll houses were popular with middle-class girls, while boys played with marbles and toy trains.

=== Industrial Era and mass-marketed toys ===
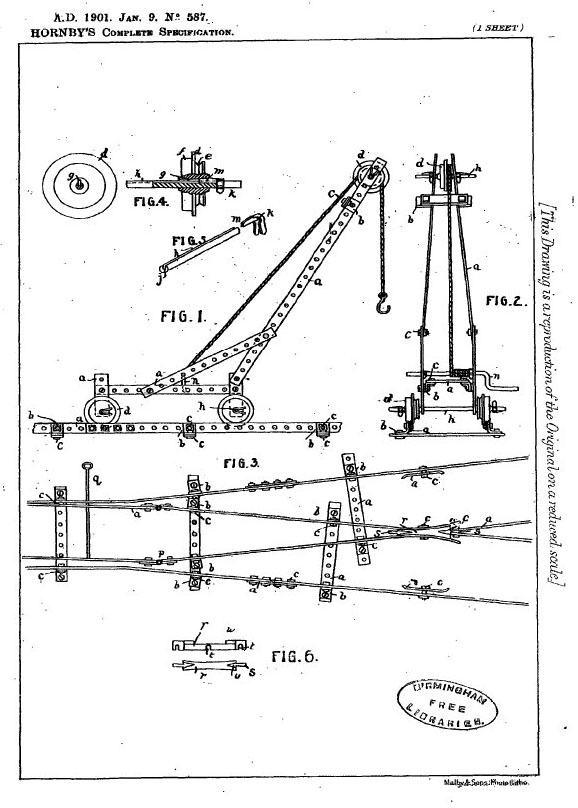
Frank Hornby's 1901 patent number GB190100587A for what later became known as Meccano

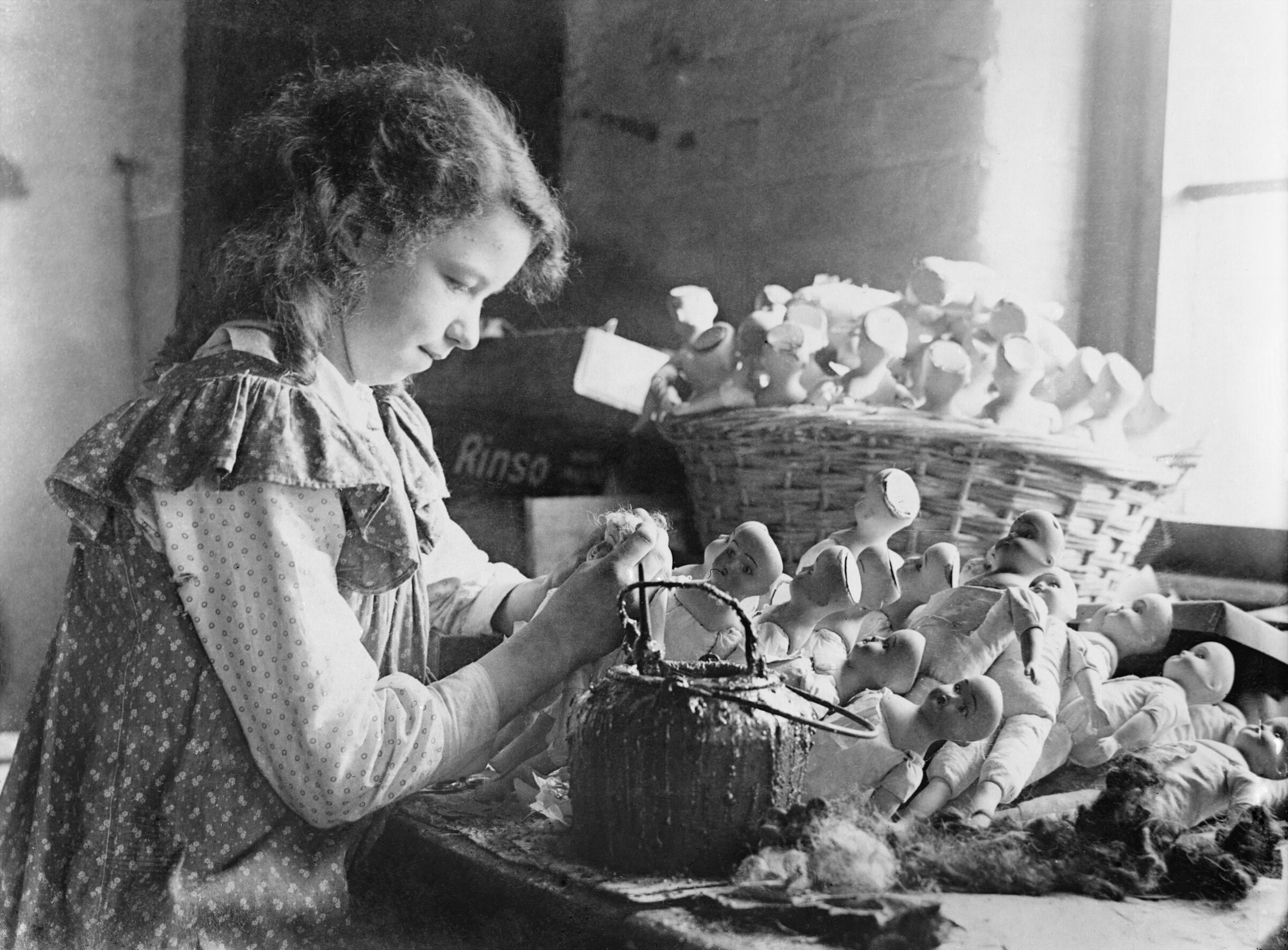
A child working in a factory producing dolls during World War I.

The golden age of toy development occurred during the Industrial Era. Real wages were rising steadily in the Western world, allowing even working-class families to afford toys for their children, and industrial techniques of precision engineering and mass production were able to provide the supply to meet this rising demand. Intellectual emphasis was also increasingly being placed on the importance of a wholesome and happy childhood for the future development of children. Franz Kolb, a German pharmacist, invented plasticine in 1880, and in 1900, commercial production of the material as a children's toy began. Frank Hornby was a visionary in toy development and manufacture and was responsible for the invention and production of three of the most popular lines of toys based on engineering principles in the twentieth century: Meccano, Hornby Model Railways and Dinky Toys.

Meccano was a model construction system that consisted of re-usable metal strips, plates, angle girders, wheels, axles and gears, with nuts and bolts to connect the pieces and enabled the building of working models and mechanical devices. Dinky Toys pioneered the manufacture of die-cast toys with the production of toy cars, trains, and ships, and model train sets became popular in the 1920s. The Britains company revolutionized the production of toy soldiers with the invention of the process of hollow casting in lead in 1893 – the company's products remained the industry standard for many years.

Puzzles became popular as well. In 1893, the English lawyer Angelo John Lewis, writing under the pseudonym of Professor Hoffman, wrote a book called Puzzles Old and New. It contained, among other things, more than 40 descriptions of puzzles with secret opening mechanisms. This book grew into a reference work for puzzle games and was very popular at the time. The Tangram puzzle, originally from China, spread to Europe and America in the 19th century.

In 1903, a year after publishing The Tale of Peter Rabbit, English author Beatrix Potter created the first Peter Rabbit soft toy and registered him at the Patent Office in London, making Peter the oldest licensed character. It was followed by other "spin-off" merchandise over the years, including painting books and board games. The Smithsonian magazine stated, "Potter was also an entrepreneur and a pioneer in licensing and merchandising literary characters. Potter built a retail empire out of her "bunny book" that is worth $500 million today. In the process, she created a system that continues to benefit all licensed characters, from Mickey Mouse to Harry Potter."

In tandem with the development of mass-produced toys, Enlightenment ideals about children's rights to education and leisure time came to fruition. During the late 18th and early 19th century, many families needed to send their children to work in factories and other sites to make ends meet—just as their predecessors had required their labor producing household goods in the medieval era. Business owners' exploitation and abuse of child laborers during this period differed from how children had been treated as workers within a family unit, though. Thanks to advocacy including photographic documentation of children's exploitation and abuse by business owners, Western nations enacted a series of child labor laws, putting an end to child labor in nations such as the U.S. (1949). This fully entrenched, through law, the Western idea that childhood is a time for leisure, not work—and with leisure time comes more space for consumer goods such as toys.

During the Second World War, some new types of toys were created through accidental innovation. After trying to create a replacement for synthetic rubber, the American Earl L. Warrick inadvertently invented "nutty putty" during World War II. Later, Peter Hodgson recognized the potential as a childhood plaything and packaged it as Silly Putty. Similarly, Play-Doh was originally created as a wallpaper cleaner. In 1943 Richard James was experimenting with springs as part of his military research when he saw one come loose and fall to the floor. He was intrigued by the way it flopped around on the floor. He spent two years fine-tuning the design to find the best gauge of steel and coil; the result was the Slinky, which went on to sell in stores throughout the United States.

After the Second World War, as Western society became ever more affluent and new technology and materials (plastics) for toy manufacture became available, toys became cheaper and more ubiquitous in households across the Western World. At this point, name-brand toys became widespread in the U.S. – a new phenomenon that helped market mass-produce toys to audiences of children growing up with ample leisure time and during a period of relative prosperity.

Among the more well-known products of the 1950s there was the Danish company Lego's line of colourful interlocking plastic brick construction sets (based on Hilary Page's Kiddicraft Self-Locking Bricks, described by London's V&A Museum of Childhood as among the "must-have toys" of the 1940s), Mr. Potato Head, the Barbie doll (inspired by the Bild Lilli doll from Germany), and Action Man. The Rubik's Cube became an enormous seller in the 1980s. In modern times, there are computerized dolls that can recognize and identify objects, the voice of their owner, and choose among hundreds of pre-programmed phrases with which to respond.

== Culture ==
The act of children's play with toys embodies the values set forth by the adults of their specific community, but through the lens of the child's perspective. Within cultural societies, toys are a medium to enhance a child's cognitive, social, and linguistic learning.

In some cultures, toys are used as a way to enhance a child's skillset within the traditional boundaries of their future roles in the community. In Saharan and North African cultures, play is facilitated by children through the use of toys to enact scenes recognizable in their community, such as hunting and herding. The value is placed in a realistic version of development in preparing a child for the future they are likely to grow up into. This allows the child to imagine and create a personal interpretation of how they view the adult world.

However, in other cultures, toys are used to expand a child's cognitive development in an idealistic fashion. In these communities, adults place the value of play with toys alongside the aspirations they set forth for their child. In Western culture, Barbie and Action-Man represent lifelike figures, but in an imaginative state out of reach from the society of these children and adults. These toys give way to a unique world in which children's play is isolated and independent of the social constraints placed on society, leaving the children free to delve into the imaginary and idealized version of what their development in life could be.

In addition, children from differing communities may treat their toys in different ways based on their cultural practices. Children in more affluent communities may tend to be possessive of their toys, while children from poorer communities may be more willing to share and interact more with other children. The importance the child places on possession is dictated by the values in place within the community that the children observe on a daily basis.

== Child development ==
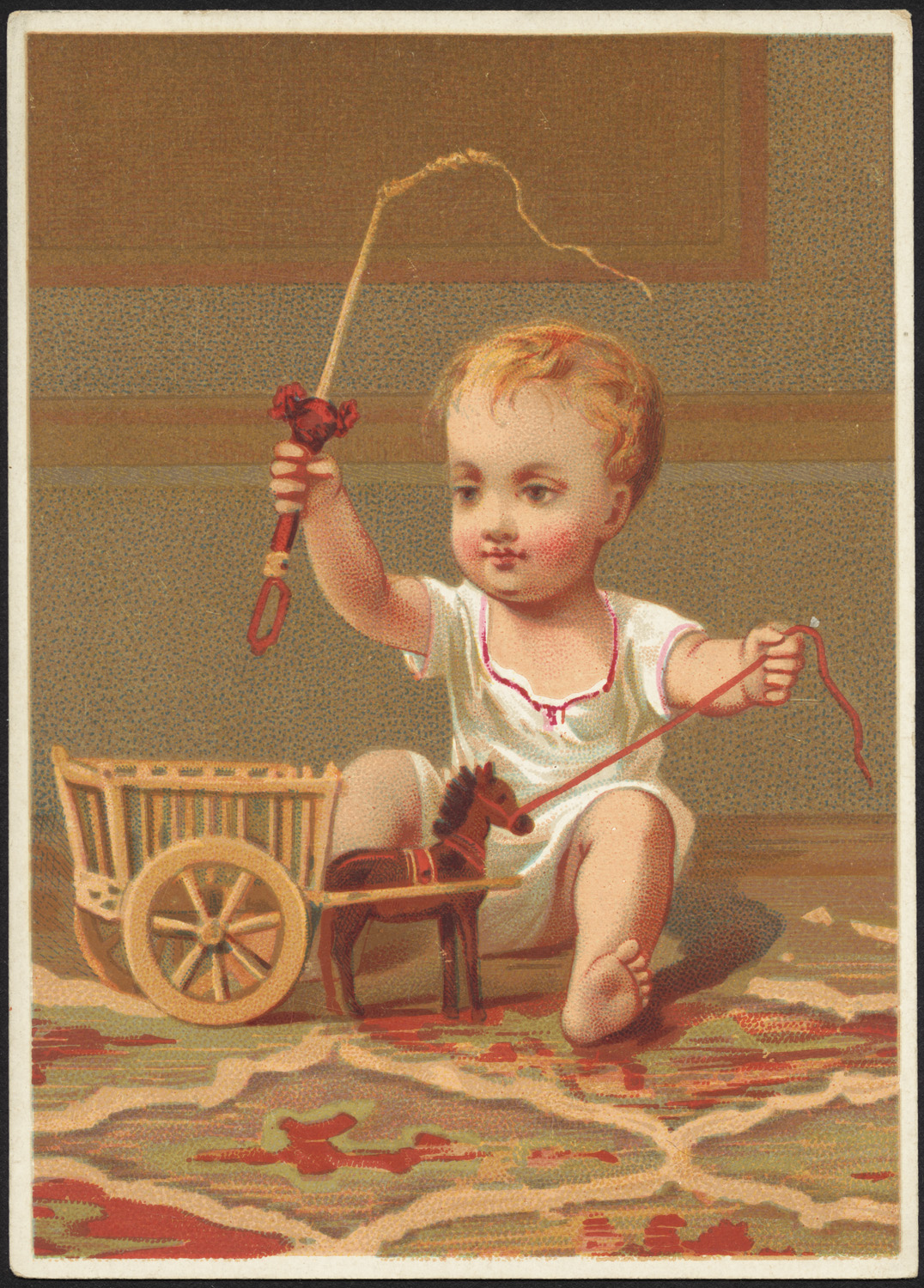
19th century illustration of a child playing with a toy horse and cart

Toys, like play itself, serve multiple purposes in both humans and animals. They provide entertainment while fulfilling an educational role, enhance cognitive behavior, stimulate creativity, and aid in the development of physical, mental, social, and emotional skills, which are necessary in later life. However, different kinds of toys may lead to different outcomes, as do various forms of play. In particular, a clinical report from the American Academy of Pediatrics stated that the developmental benefits of traditional toys involving language, creativity, pretending, problem-solving, physical activity, child-caregiver interaction, or peer play, are generally better supported by evidence than the educational claims often associated with digital or electronic toys.

Wooden blocks, though simple, are regarded by early childhood education experts such as Sally Cartwright (1974) as an excellent toy for young children; she praised the fact that they are relatively easy to engage with, can be used in repeatable and predictable ways, and are versatile and open-ended, allowing for a wide variety of developmentally appropriate play. Andrew Witkin, director of marketing for Mega Brands, told Investor's Business Daily that "They help develop hand-eye coordination, math and science skills and also let kids be creative." Other toys like marbles, jackstones, and balls serve similar functions in child development, allowing children to use their minds and bodies to learn about spatial relationships, cause and effect, and a wide range of other skills.

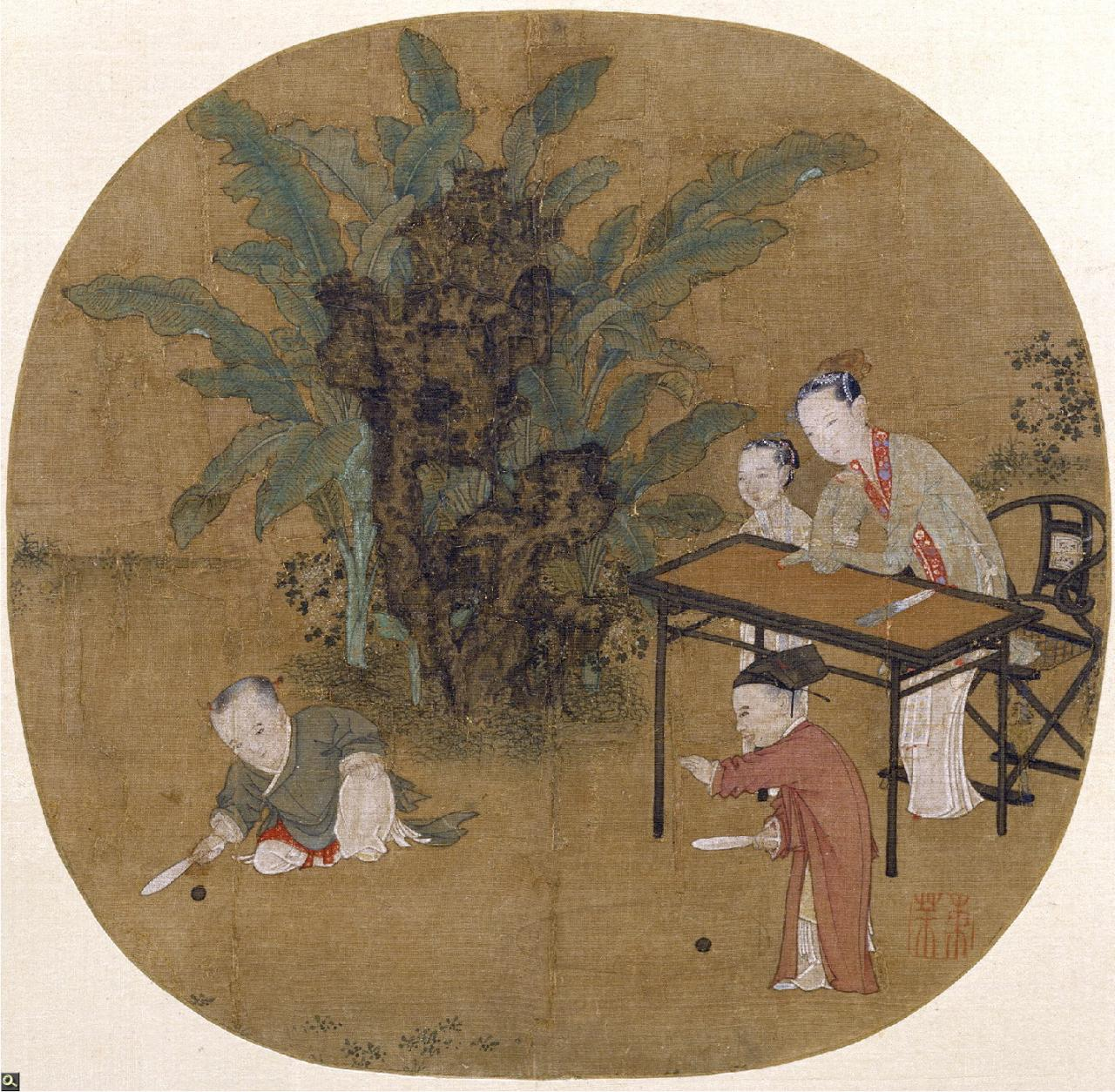
Two children playing with paddle balls in Hitting the Ball in the Shadow of the Banana, a painting by the Chinese artist Su Hanchen (苏汉臣, active 1130s–1160s AD), Song dynasty

One example of the dramatic ways that toys can influence child development involves clay sculpting toys such as Play-Doh and Silly Putty and their home-made counterparts. Mary Ucci, Educational Director of the Child Study Center of Wellesley College, has demonstrated how such toys positively impact the physical development, cognitive development, emotional development, and social development of children.

Toys for infants often make use of distinctive sounds, bright colors, and unique textures. Through repetition of play with toys, infants begin to recognize shapes and colors. Play-Doh, Silly Putty, and other hands-on materials allow the child to make toys of their own.

Educational toys for school age children of often contain a puzzle, problem-solving technique, or mathematical proposition. Often, toys designed for older audiences, such as teenagers or adults, demonstrate advanced concepts. Newton's cradle, a desk toy designed by Simon Prebble, demonstrates the conservation of momentum and energy.

Not all toys are appropriate for all ages of children. Even some toys which are marketed for a specific age range can even harm the development of children in that range, such as when for example toys meant for young girls contribute to the ongoing problem of girls' sexualization in Western culture.

A study suggested that supplying fewer toys in the environment allows toddlers to better focus to explore and play more creatively. The provision of four rather than sixteen toys is thus suggested to promote children's development and healthy play.

=== Age compression ===
Age compression is a term used by some researchers and commentators to describe a perceived trend in which children move through play stages at earlier ages than in previous decades. Children have a desire to progress to more complex toys at a faster pace, girls in particular. Barbie dolls, for example, were once marketed to girls around 8 years old but have been found to be more popular in recent years with girls around 3 years old, with most girls outgrowing the brand by about age 7. The packaging for the dolls labels them appropriate for ages 3 and up. Boys, in contrast, apparently enjoy toys and games over a longer timespan, gravitating towards toys that meet their interest in assembling and disassembling mechanical toys, and toys that "move fast and things that fight". An industry executive points out that girls have entered the "tween" phase by the time they are 8 years old and want non-traditional toys, whereas boys have been maintaining an interest in traditional toys until they are 12 years old, meaning the traditional toy industry holds onto their boy customers for 50% longer than their girl customers.

Girls gravitate towards "music, clothes, make-up, television talent shows and celebrities". As young children are more exposed to and drawn to music intended for older children and teens, companies are having to rethink how they develop and market their products. Girls also demonstrate a longer loyalty to characters in toys and games marketed towards them. A variety of global toy companies have marketed themselves to this aspect of girls' development, for example, the Hello Kitty brand and the Disney Princess franchise. Boys have shown an interest in computer games at an ever-younger age in recent years.

== Gender ==
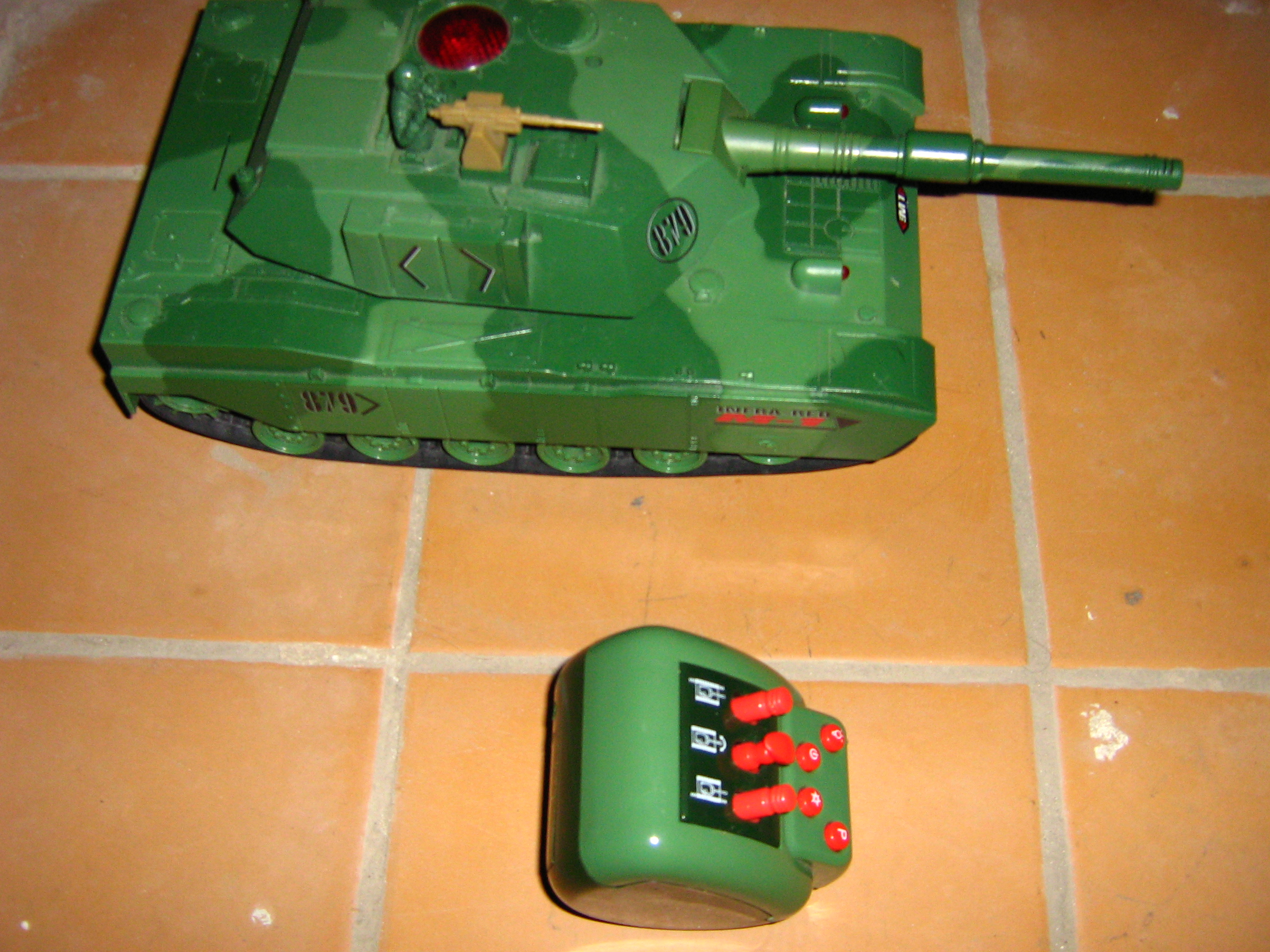
A toy tank with a remote control. Such toys are generally thought of as boys' toys.

Certain toys, such as Barbie dolls and toy soldiers, are often perceived as being more acceptable for one gender than the other. The turning point for the addition of gender to toys came about in the 1960s and 1970s. Before 1975, only about two percent of toys were labeled by gender, whereas today on the Disney store's website, considered a dominating global force for toys by researcher Claire Miller, all toys are labeled by gender. The journal Sex Roles began publishing research on this topic in 1975, focusing on the effects of gender in youth. Too many psychological textbooks began to address this new issue. Along with these publications, researchers also started to challenge the ideas of male and female as being opposites, even going as far as to claim toys which have characteristics of both genders are preferable.

A milestone for research on gender is the use of meta-analysis, which provides a way to assess patterns in a systematic way, especially relevant for a topic such as gender, which can be difficult to quantify. Nature and nurture have historically been analyzed when looking at gender in play, as well as reinforcement by peers and parents of typical gender roles and consequently, gender play. Toy companies have often promoted segregation by gender in toys because it enables them to customize the same toy for each gender, which ultimately doubles their revenue. For example, Legos added more colors to certain sets of toys in the 1990s, including colors commonly attributed to girls such as lavender.

It has been noted by researchers that, "Children as young as 18 months display sex-stereotyped toy choices". When eye movement is tracked in young infants, infant girls show a visual preference for a doll over a toy truck (d > 1.0). Boys showed no preference for the truck over the doll. However, they did fixate on the truck more than the girls (d = .78). This small study suggests that even before any self-awareness of gender identity has emerged, children already prefer sex-typical toys. These differences in toy choice are well established within the child by the age of three.

Another study done by Jeffrey Trawick-Smith took 60 different children ages three to four and observed them playing with nine different toys deemed best for development. They were allowed to play with the toys in a typical environment, a preschool classroom, which allowed for the results to be more authentic compared to research done in a lab. The researchers then quantified play quality of the children with each toy based on factors such as learning, problem solving, curiosity, creativity, imagination, and peer interaction. The results revealed that boys generally received higher scores for overall play quality than girls, and the toys with the best play quality were those identified as the most gender-neutral, such as building blocks and bricks, along with pieces modeling people. Trawick-Smith then concluded that the study encourages a focus on toys that are beneficial to both genders in order to create a better balance.

While some parents promote gender neutral play, many parents encourage their children to participate in sex-typed activities, including doll-playing and engaging in housekeeping activities for girls and playing with trucks and engaging in sports activities for boys. Researcher Susan Witt said that parents are the primary influencers on the gender roles of their children. Parents, siblings, peers, and even teachers have been shown to react more positively to children engaging in sex-typical behavior and playing with sex-typical toys. This is often done through encouragement or discouragement, as well as suggestions and imitation. Additionally, sons are more likely to be reinforced for sex-typical play and discouraged from atypical play. However, it is generally not as looked down upon for girls to play with toys designed "for boys", an activity which has also become more common in recent years. Fathers are also more likely to reinforce typical play and discourage atypical play than mothers are. A study done by researcher Susan Witt suggests that stereotypes are oftentimes only strengthened by the environment, which perpetuates them to linger in older life.

This stereotypical attribution of sex-typical toys for girls and boys is gradually changing, with toy companies creating more gender neutral toys, as the benefits associated with allowing children to play with toys that appeal to them far outweighs controlling their individual preferences. For example, many stores are beginning to change their gender labels on children's play items. Target removed all identification related to gender from their toy aisles, and Disney did the same for their costumes. The Disney store is an especially prevalent example of gender in play because it is a global identity in the toy world. A study done regarding their website found that though they have removed gender labels from their costumes, the toys online reflect more stereotypical gender identities. For example, toys depicting males were associated with physicality, and females were associated with beauty, housing, and caring. Though Disney promotes their toys as being for both genders, there is no gender neutral section on their website. Those that are generally deemed for both genders more closely resemble what many would label "boy toys," as they relate closer to the stereotype of masculinity within play.

Traditions within various cultures promote the passing down of certain toys to their children based on the child's gender. In Indigenous South American communities, boys receive a toy bow and arrow from their father, while young girls receive a toy basket from their mother. In North African and Saharan cultural communities, gender plays a role in the creation of self-made dolls. While female dolls are used to represent brides, mothers, and wives, male dolls are used to represent horsemen and warriors. This contrast stems from the various roles of men and women within the Saharan and North African communities. There are differences in the toys that are intended for girls and boys within various cultures, which is reflective of the differing roles of men and women within a specific cultural community.

Research on the repercussions of gender in toys suggests that desegregation of the genders can be achieved by encouraging more gender-neutral play. Researchers Carol Auster and Claire Mansbach have argued that allowing children to play with toys which more closely fit their talents would help them to better develop their skills. In terms of parental influence, a study found that parents who demonstrated some androgynous behavior have higher scores in support, warmth, and self-worth in regards to the treatment of their children. Even as this debate is evolving and children are becoming more inclined to cross barriers in terms of gender with their toys, girls are typically more encouraged to do so than boys because of the societal value of masculinity.

== Economics ==
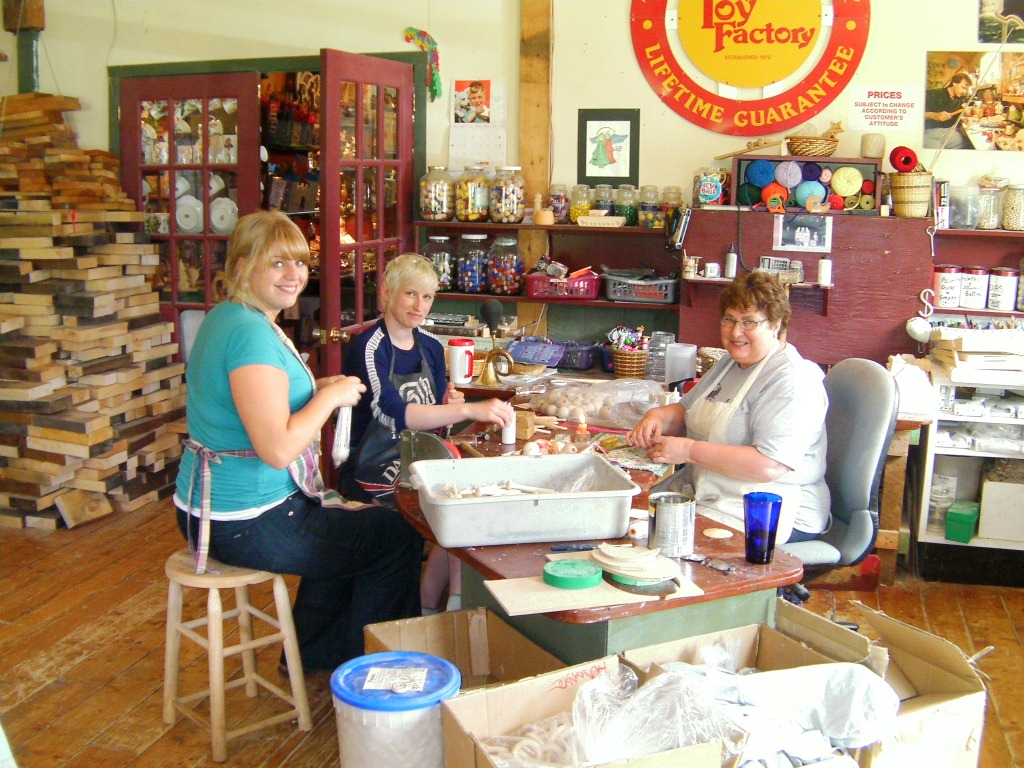
Making toys, Digby, Nova Scotia. 2008

With toys comprising such a large and important part of human existence, the toy industry has a substantial economic impact. Sales of toys often increase around holidays where gift-giving is a tradition. Some of these holidays include Christmas, Easter, Saint Nicholas Day, and Three Kings Day.

In 2005, toy sales in the United States totaled about $22.9 billion. Money spent on children between the ages of 8 and twelve alone totals approximately $221 million annually in the U.S. It was estimated that in 2011, 88% of toy sales was in the age group 0–11 years.

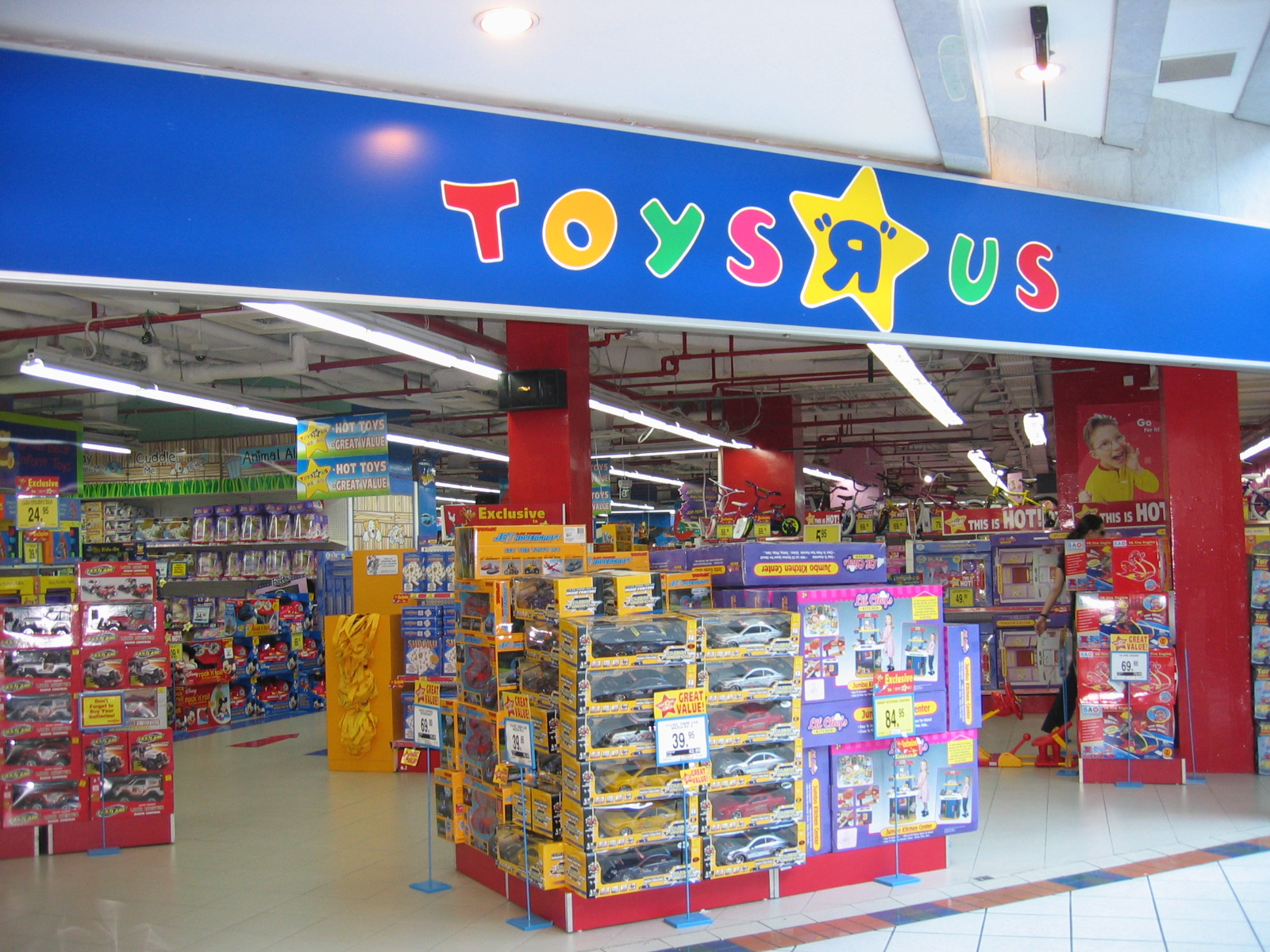
Toys "R" Us operated over 1,500 stores in 30 countries and had an annual revenue of US$13.6 billion

Toy companies change and adapt their toys to meet the changing demands of children thereby gaining a larger share of the substantial market. In recent years many toys have become more complicated with flashing lights and sounds in an effort to appeal to children raised around television and the internet. According to Mattel's president, Neil Friedman, "Innovation is key in the toy industry and to succeed one must create a 'wow' moment for kids by designing toys that have fun, innovative features and include new technologies and engaging content.

In an effort to reduce costs, many mass producers of toys locate their factories in areas where wages are lower. China manufactures about 70 percent of the world's toys and is home to more than 8,000 toy firms, most of which are located in the Pearl River Delta of Guangdong Province. 75% of all toys sold in the U.S., for example, are manufactured in China. Issues and events such as power outages, supply of raw materials, supply of labor, and raising wages that impact areas where factories are located often have an enormous impact on the toy industry in importing countries.

Many traditional toy makers have been losing sales to video game makers for years. Because of this, some traditional toy makers have entered the field of electronic games and have even been turning audio games into toys, and are enhancing the brands that they have by introducing interactive extensions or internet connectivity to their current toys.

In addition, the rise of distributed manufacturing enables consumers to make their own toys from open source designs with a 3-D printer. As of 2017 consumers were already offsetting millions of dollars per year by 3D printing their own toys from MyMiniFactory, a single repository.

== Types ==
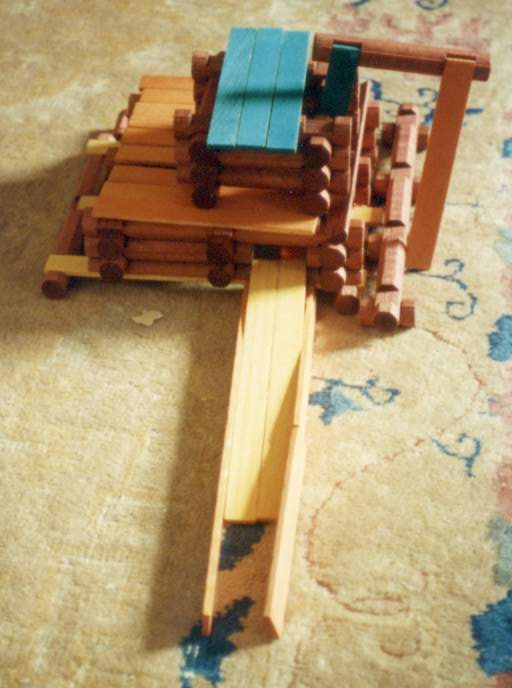
Lincoln Logs have been a popular construction type toy in the U.S. since the 1920s.

=== Construction sets ===
The Greek philosopher Plato wrote that the future architect should play at building houses as a child. A construction set is a collection of separate pieces that can be joined to create models. Popular models include cars, spaceships, and houses. The things that are built are sometimes used as toys once completed, but generally speaking, the object is to build things of one's own design, and old models often are broken up with the pieces reused in new models.

The oldest and perhaps most common construction toy is a set of simple wooden blocks, which are often painted in bright colors and given to babies and toddlers. Construction sets such as Lego bricks and Lincoln Logs are designed for slightly older children and have been quite popular in the last century. Construction sets appeal to children (and adults) who like to work with their hands, puzzle solvers, and imaginative sorts.

Some other examples include Bayko, Konstruk-Tubes, K'Nex, Erector Sets, Tinkertoys, and Meccano, and generic construction toys such as Neodymium magnet toys.

=== Dolls and miniatures ===
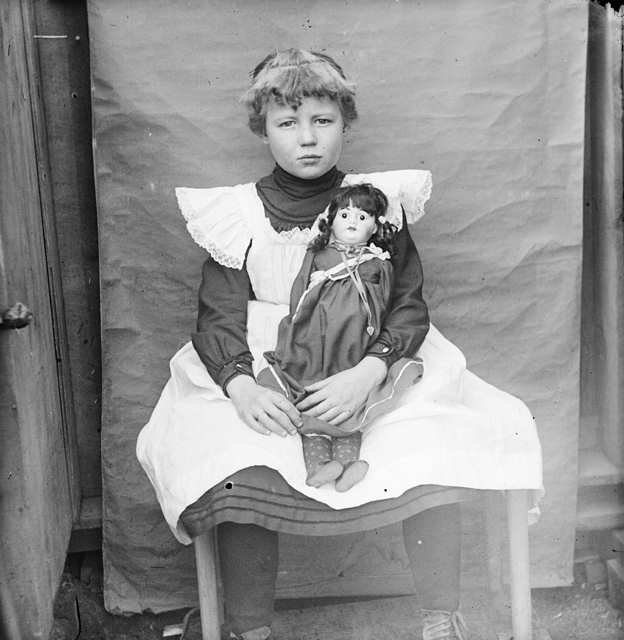
A girl and her doll in the 1900s

A doll is a model of a human (often a baby), a humanoid (like Bert and Ernie), or an animal. Modern dolls are often made of cloth or plastic. Other materials that are, or have been, used in the manufacture of dolls include cornhusks, bone, stone, wood, porcelain (sometimes called china), bisque, celluloid, wax, and even apples. Often, people will make dolls out of whatever materials are available to them.

Sometimes intended as decorations, keepsakes, or collectibles for older children and adults, most dolls are intended as toys for children, usually girls, to play with. Dolls have been found in Egyptian tombs that date to as early as 2000 BCE.

Dolls are usually miniatures, but baby dolls may be of true size and weight. A doll or stuffed animal of soft material is sometimes called a plush toy or plushie. A popular toy of this type is the Teddy Bear.

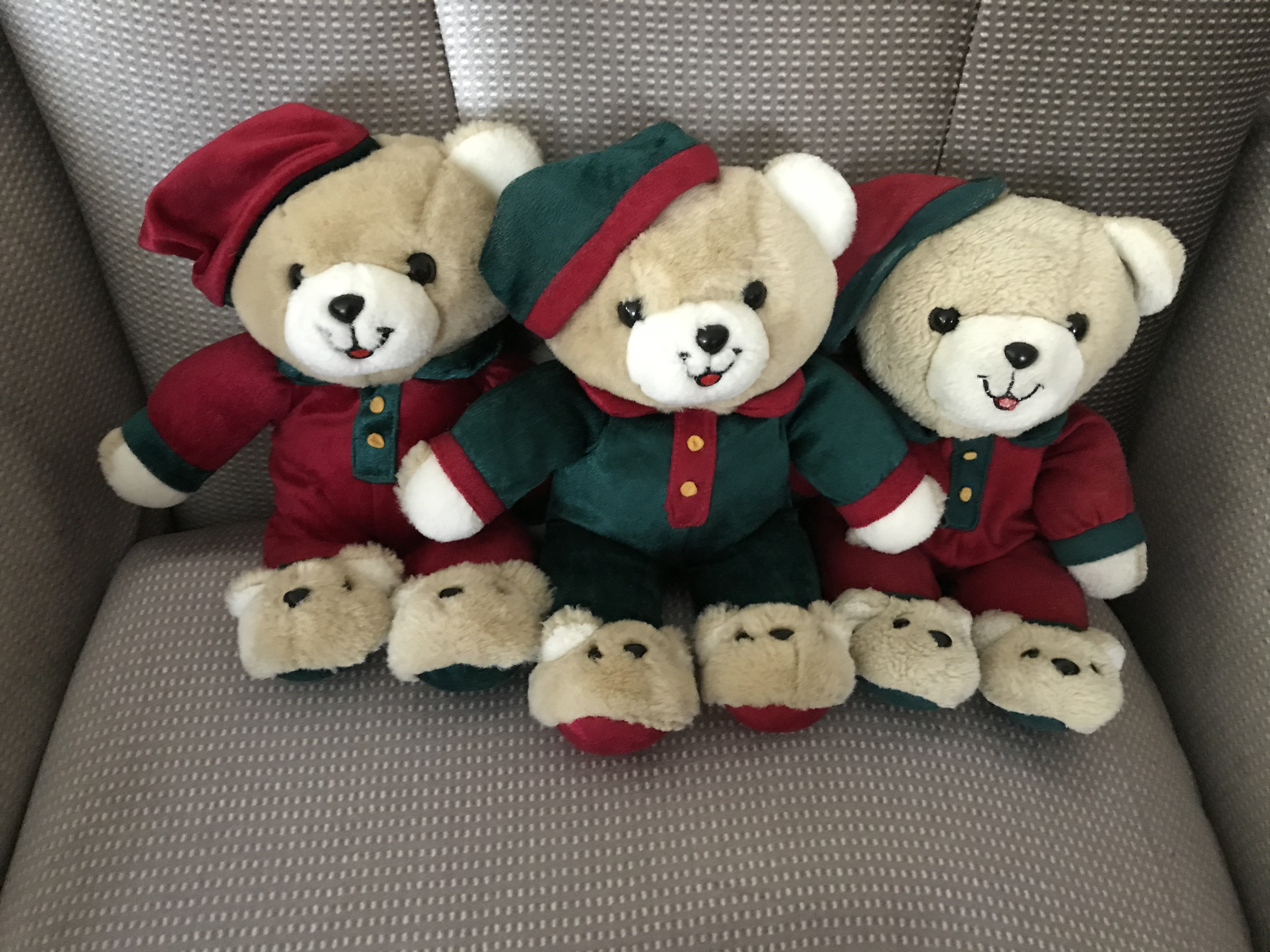
Teddy Bears

A distinction is often made between dolls and action figures, which are generally of plastic or semi-metallic construction and poseable to some extent, and often are merchandising from television shows or films which feature the characters. Modern action figures, such as Action Man, are often marketed towards boys, whereas dolls are often marketed towards girls.

Toy soldiers, perhaps a precursor to modern action figures, have been a popular toy for centuries. They allow children to act out battles, often with toy military equipment and a castle or fort. Miniature animal figures are also widespread, with children perhaps acting out farm activities with animals and equipment centered on a toy farm.

=== Vehicles ===
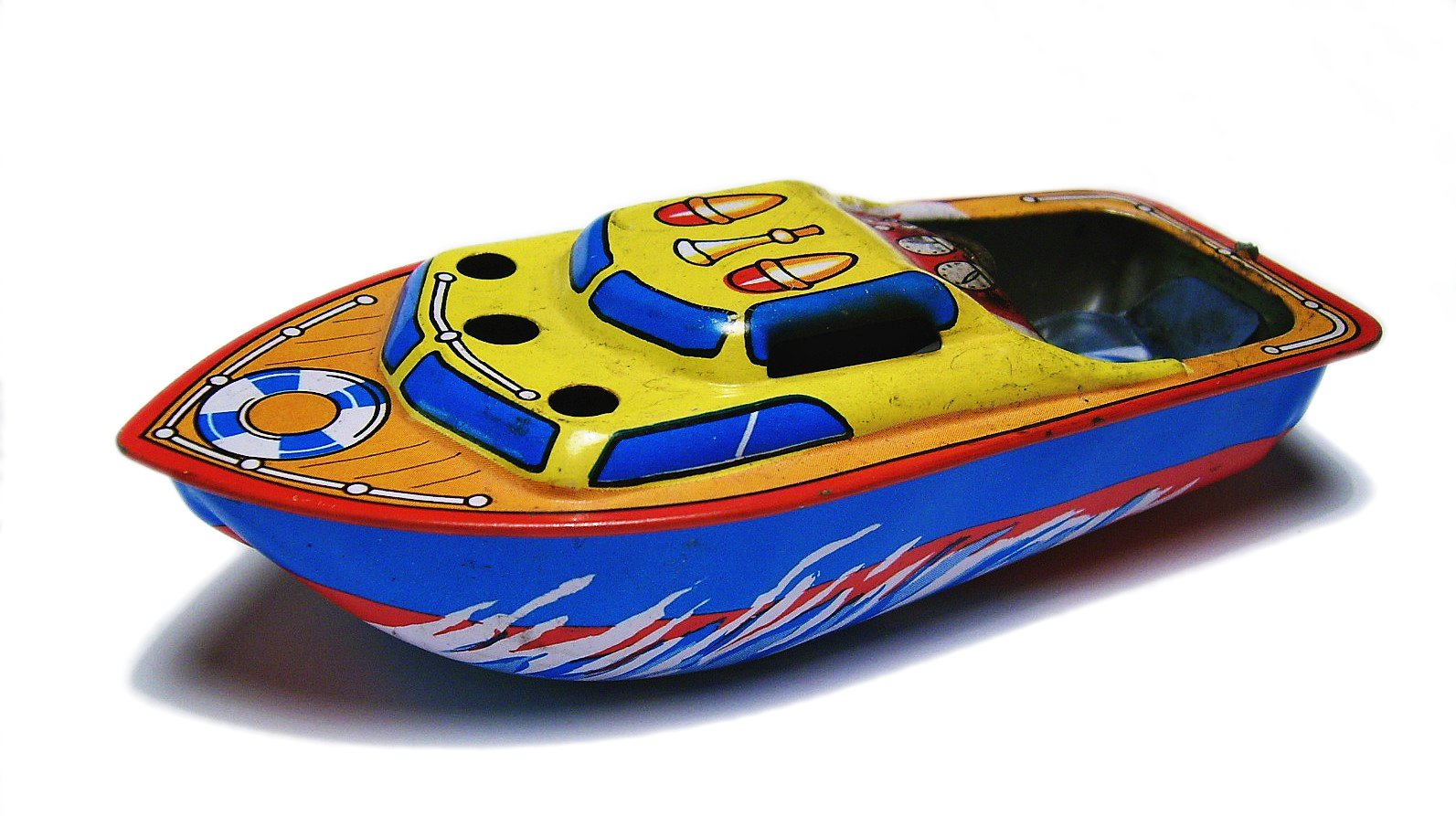
A toy boat

Children have played with miniature versions of vehicles since ancient times, with toy two-wheeled carts being depicted on ancient Greek vases. Wind-up toys have also played a part in the advancement of toy vehicles. Modern equivalents include toy cars such as those produced by Matchbox or Hot Wheels, miniature aircraft, toy boats, military vehicles, and trains. Examples of the latter range from wooden sets for younger children such as BRIO to more complicated realistic train models like those produced by Lionel, Doepke and Hornby. Larger die-cast vehicles, 1:18 scale, have become popular toys; these vehicles are produced with a great attention to detail.

=== Puzzles ===
A Rubik's Cube

A puzzle is a problem or enigma that challenges ingenuity. Solutions to puzzles may require recognizing patterns and creating a particular order. People with a high inductive reasoning aptitude may be better at solving these puzzles than others. Puzzles based on the process of inquiry and discovery to complete may be solved faster by those with good deduction skills. A popular puzzle toy is the Rubik's Cube, invented by Hungarian Ernő Rubik in 1974. Popularized in the 1980s, solving the cube requires planning and problem-solving skills and involves algorithms.

There are many different types of puzzles; for example, a maze is a type of tour puzzle. Other categories include: construction puzzles, stick puzzles, tiling puzzles, disentanglement puzzles, sliding puzzles, logic puzzles, picture puzzles, lock puzzles, and mechanical puzzles.

=== Collectibles ===
Some toys, such as Beanie Babies, attract large numbers of enthusiasts, eventually becoming collectibles. Other toys, such as Boyds Bears are marketed to adults as collectibles. Some people spend large sums of money in an effort to acquire larger and more complete collections. The record for a single Pez dispenser at an auction, for example, is US$1100.

=== Promotional merchandise ===
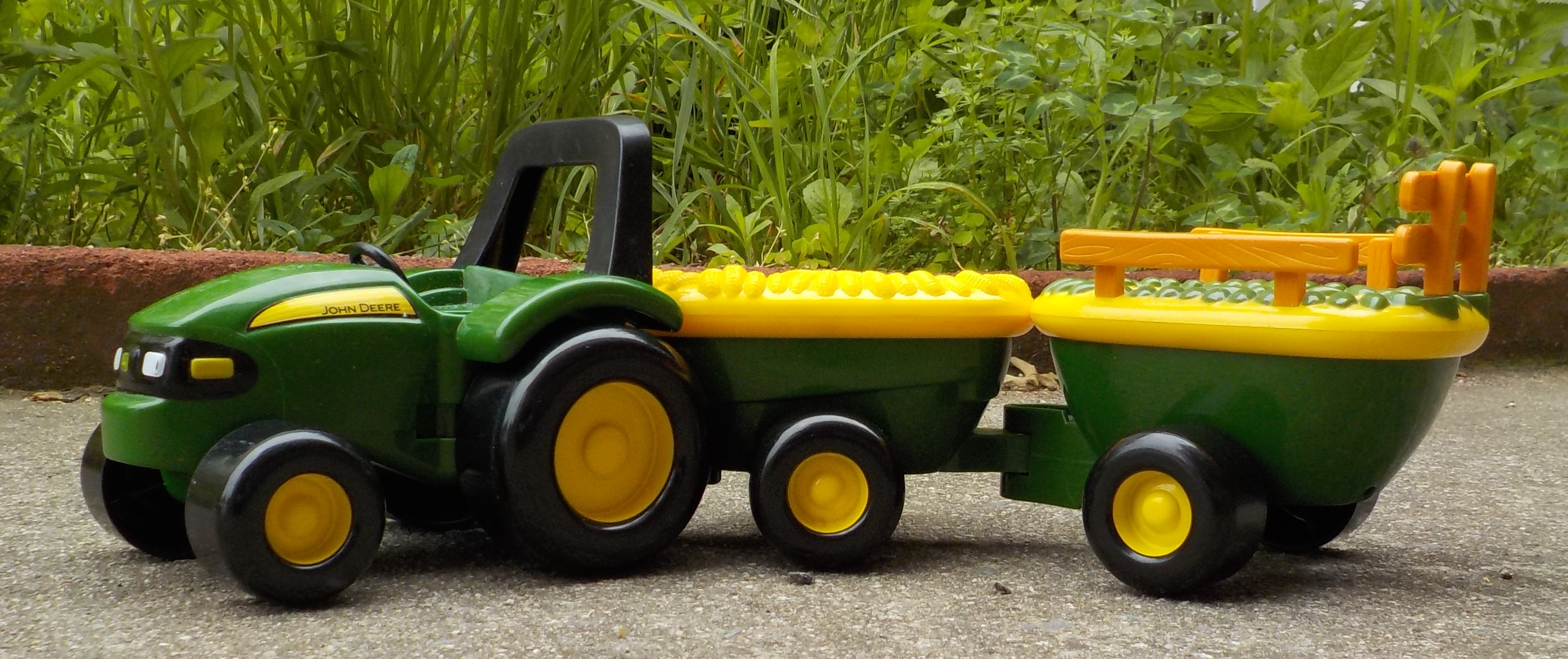
This toy tractor also serves as an advertisement for John Deere.

Many successful films, television programs, books and sport teams have official merchandise, which often includes related toys. Some notable examples are Star Wars (a space fantasy franchise) and Arsenal, an English football club.

Likewise, many successful children's films, television series, books or franchises extend their marketing campaign to fast food chains by including small toys of fictional characters or the series' associated symbols in a sealed plastic bag within their kids' meals. One famous example is the Happy Meal from McDonald's.

Promotional toys can fall into any of the other toy categories; for example, they can be dolls or action figures based on the characters of movies or professional athletes, or they can be balls, yo-yos, or lunch boxes with logos on them. Sometimes they are given away for free as a form of advertising. Model aircraft are often toys that are used by airlines to promote their brand, just as toy cars and trucks and model trains are used by trucking, railroad and other companies as well. Many food manufacturers run promotions where a toy is included with the main product as a prize. Toys are also used as premiums, where consumers redeem proofs of purchase from a product and pay shipping and handling fees to get the toy. Some people go to great lengths to collect these sorts of promotional toys.

=== Digital toys ===
Digital toys are toys that incorporate some form of interactive digital technology. Examples of digital toys include virtual pets and handheld electronic games. Among the earliest digital toys are Mattel Auto Race and the Little Professor, both released in 1976. The concept of using technology in a way that bridges the digital with the physical world, providing unique interactive experiences for the user, has also been referred to as phygital.

=== Physical activity ===
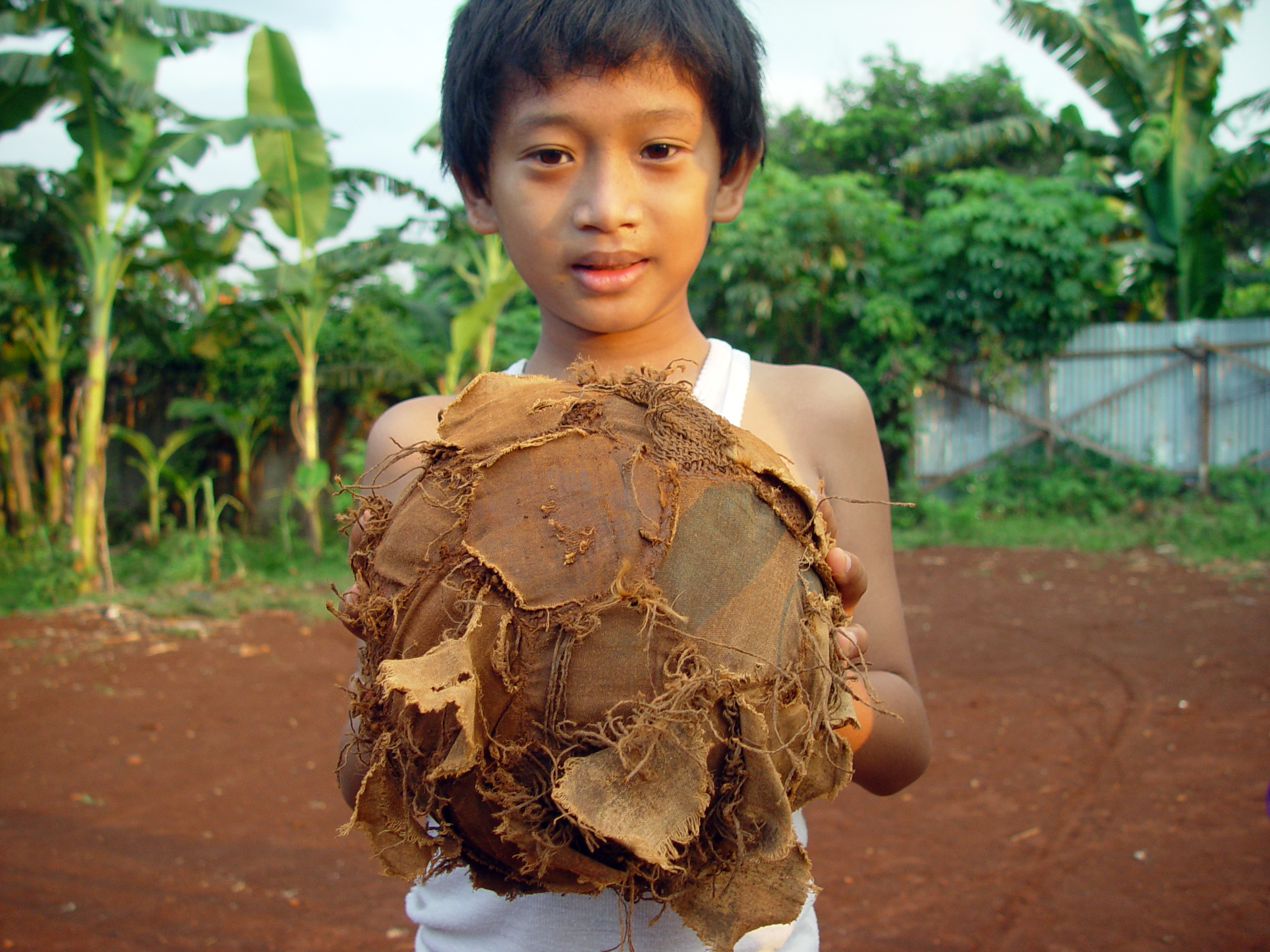
A boy from Jakarta with his ball. Ball games are good exercise, and are popular worldwide.

A large amount of toys are part of active play. These include traditional toys such as hoops, tops, jump ropes, and balls, as well as more modern toys like Frisbees, foot bags, fidget toys, astrojax, and Myachi.

Playing with these sorts of toys allows children to exercise, building strong bones and muscles and aiding in physical fitness. Throwing and catching balls and Frisbees can improve hand–eye coordination. Jumping rope, (also known as skipping) and playing with foot bags can improve balance.

== Safety regulations ==
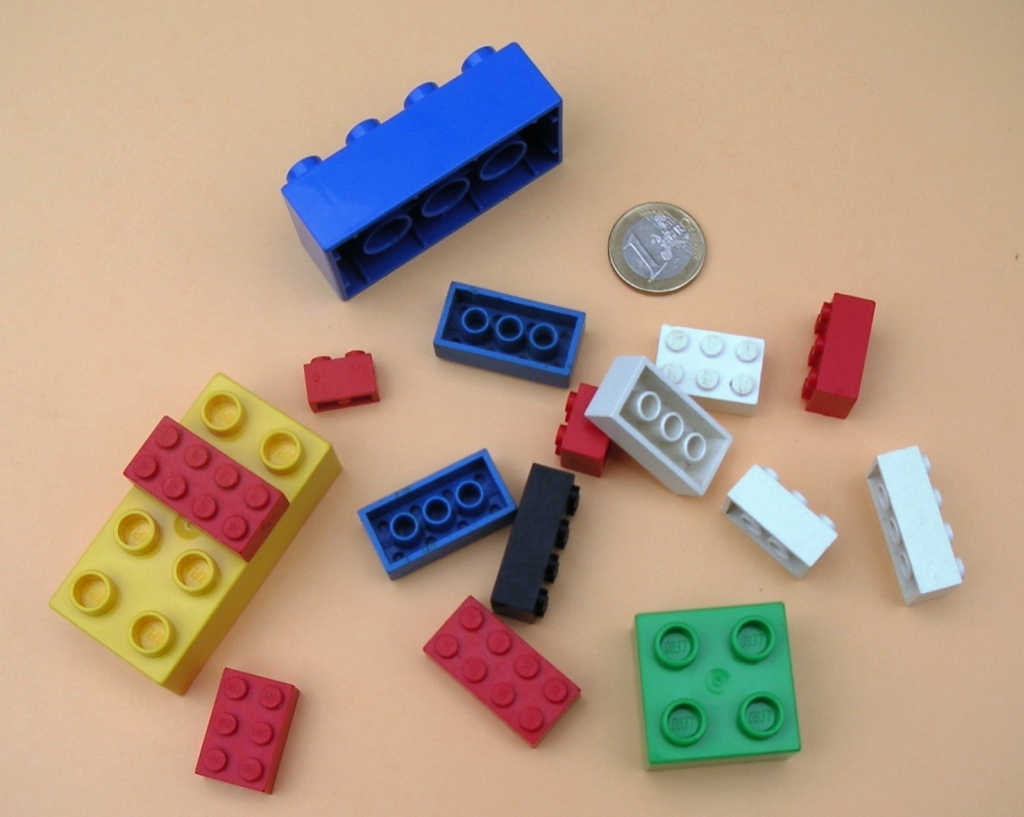
Toys with small parts, such as these Lego elements are required by law in some countries to have warnings about choking hazards.

Many countries have passed safety standards limiting the types of toys that can be sold. Most of these seek to limit potential hazards, such as choking or fire hazards that could cause injury. Children, especially very young ones, often put toys into their mouths, so the materials used to make a toy are regulated to prevent poisoning. Materials are also regulated to prevent fire hazards. Young children cannot judge what is safe and what is dangerous, and parents do not always think of all possible situations, so such warnings and regulations are important on toys.

Every country has its own regulations on toy safety, but since the globalization and opening of markets, most of them try to harmonize their regulations. The most common danger for younger children is to put toys in their mouths. This is why chemicals contained in paint and other components of children's products are carefully regulated. Countries or trade zones such as the European Union regularly publish lists to regulate the quantities or ban chemicals from toys and juvenile products. The globalization of toys has had negative effects on locally produced toys in various countries, pushing out traditional ways of play and presenting new risks to children in areas where parental literacy levels make it hard for parents to understand the risks and age-appropriateness of various imported toys.

There have also been issues of toy safety regarding lead paint. Some toy factories, when projects become too large for them to handle, outsource production to other less known factories, often in other countries. In 2007, Fisher-Price recalled about 967,000 licensed character toys made in China because surface paints on the toys could contain excessive levels of lead. The subcontractors may not be watched as closely and sometimes use improper manufacturing methods. The U.S. government, along with mass market stores, is now moving towards requiring companies to submit their products to testing before they end up on shelves.

== Disposal ==
In 2007, massive recalls of toys produced in China led many U.S.-based charities to cut back on, or even discontinue, their acceptance of used toys. Goodwill stopped accepting donations of any toys except for stuffed animals, and other charities checked all toys against government-issued checklists.

The WEEE directive (Waste Electrical and Electronic Equipment), which aims at increasing re-using, reducing, and recycling electronic waste, applies to toys in the United Kingdom as of 2 January 2007.

Toys may also be created from discarded items, rather than becoming waste themselves. For example, in India, science educator and toy inventor Arvind Gupta has been credited with designing over 1,300 toys from ordinary materials and recycled rubbish to promote sustainability and science education in underprivileged village schools.

== Toy use in animals ==
It is not unusual for some animals to play with toys. An example of this is a dolphin being trained to nudge a ball through a hoop. Young chimpanzees use sticks as dolls–the social aspect is seen by the fact that young females more often use a stick this way than young male chimpanzees. They carry their chosen stick and put it in their nest. Such behaviour is also seen in some adult female chimpanzees, but never after they have become mothers.

== See also ==
- Antique toy show
- Boys' games and toys
- Battery recycling
- Board games
- Card games
- Girls' games and toys
- List of toys
- List of toys and children's media awards
- List of wooden toys
- National Toy Hall of Fame (United States)
- Toy museums
- Toy Story, a franchise about anthropomorphic toys
- Traditional Mexican handcrafted toys
