= Mumblety-peg =

Knife-throwing game

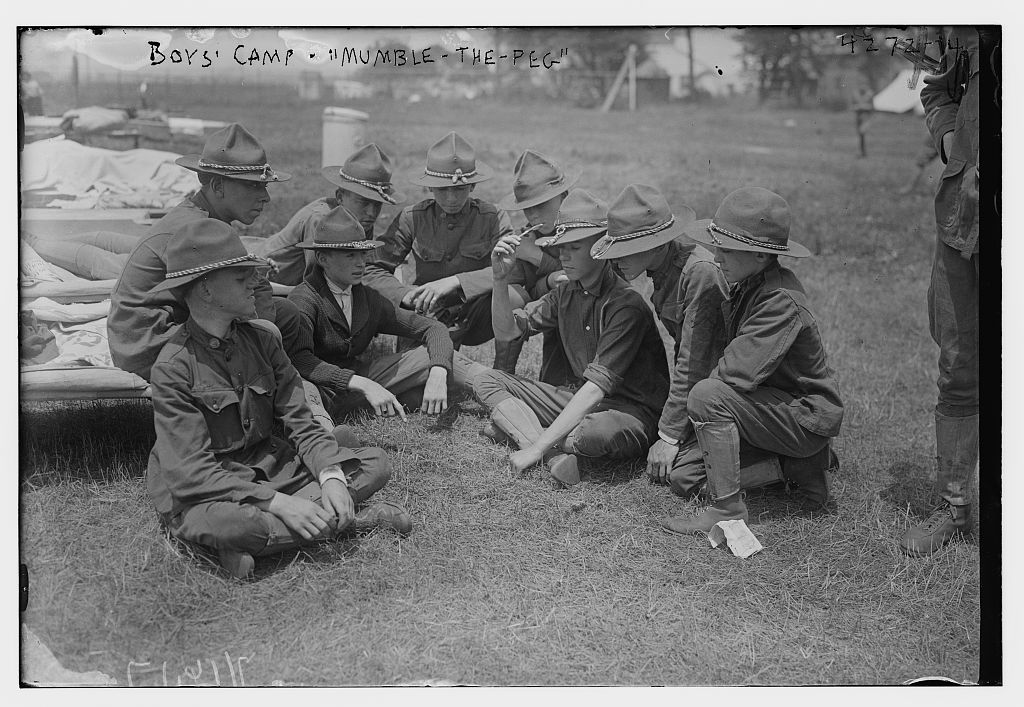
Boy Scouts playing "mumble the peg", circa 1915

Mumblety-peg (also known as mumbley-peg, mumbly-peg, mumblepeg, mumble-the-peg, mumbledepeg, mumble peg or mumble-de-peg) is an old outdoor children's game played using pocketknives. The term "mumblety-peg" came from the practice of putting a peg of about 2 to 3 in (5 to 8 cm) into the ground. The loser of the game had to take it out with his teeth. When the loser would go to remove the peg, it would sound as if he or she was mumbling.

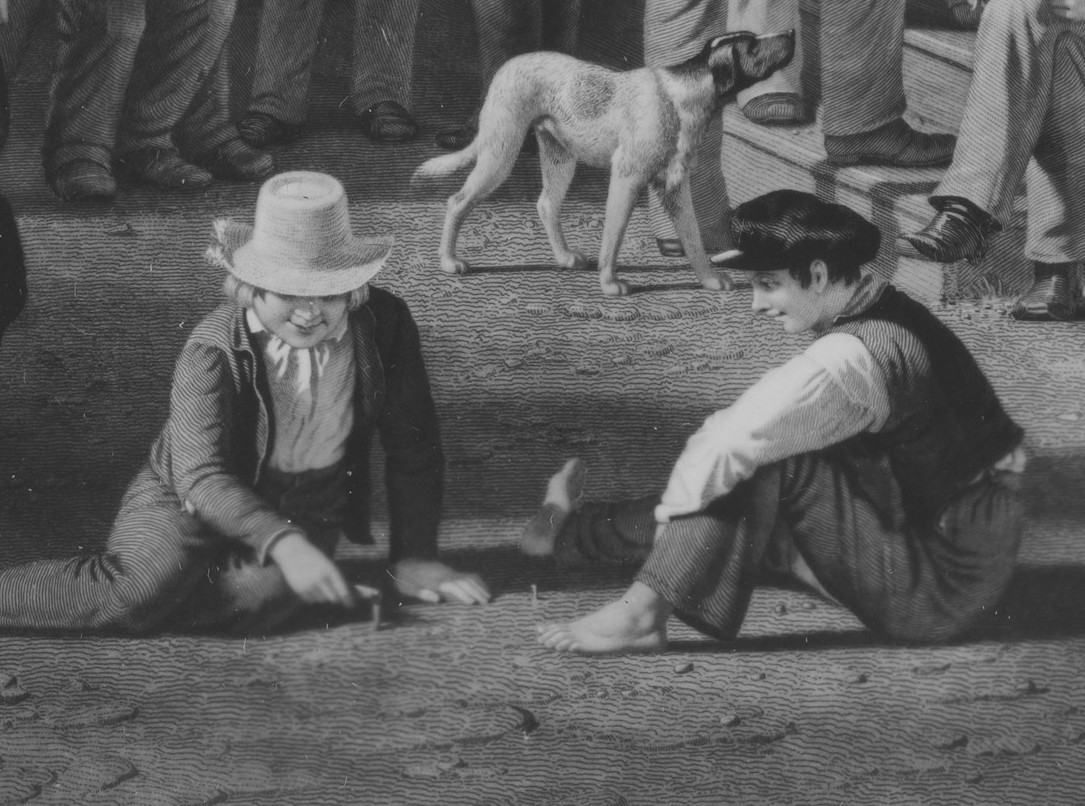
Detail of George Caleb Bingham's 1852 work The County Election, showing two boys playing a game described as mumblety-peg

== Overview ==
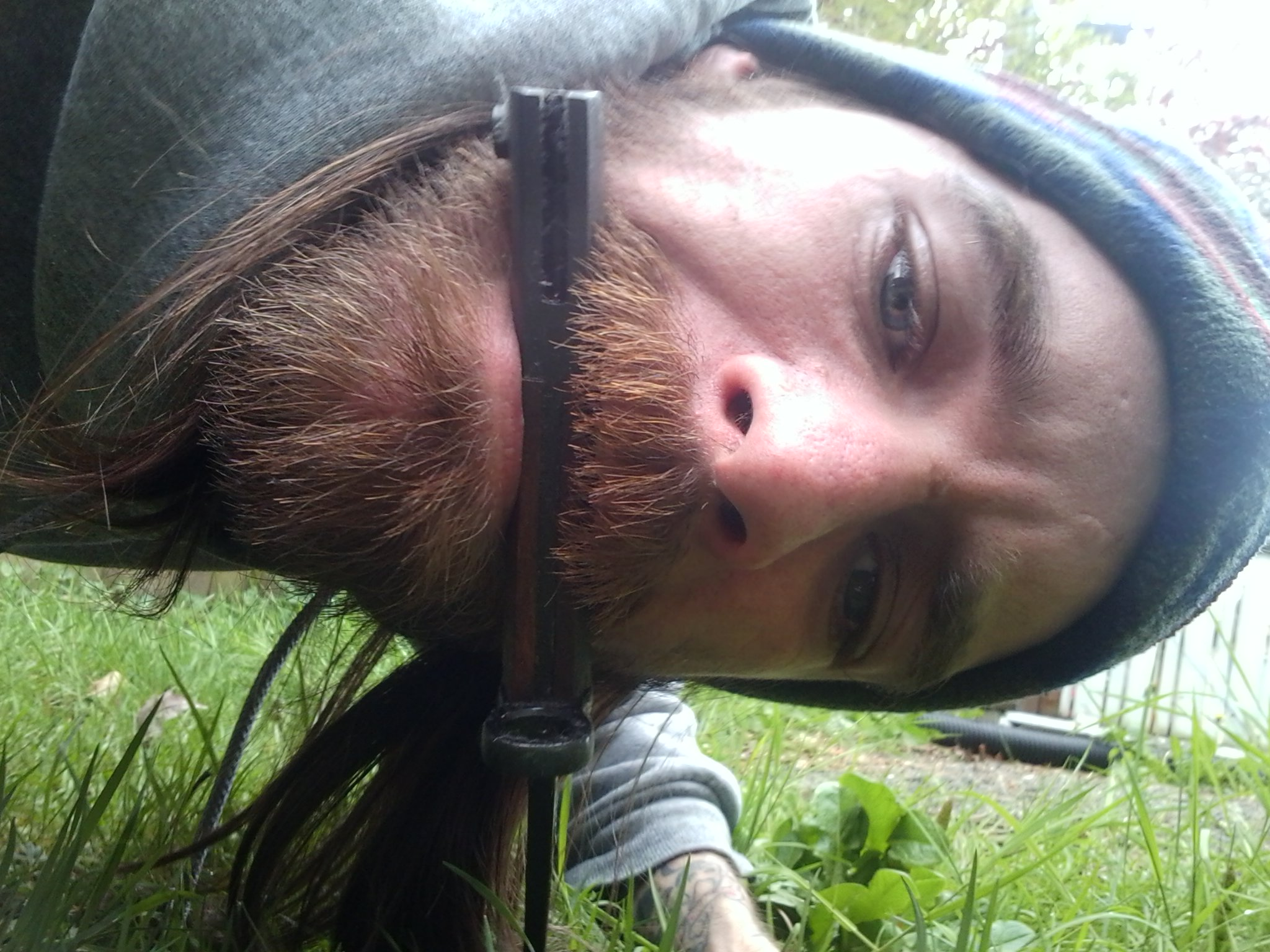
In one basic version of the game, a knife is embedded in the ground and players attempt to extract it using only their teeth. In other versions this is a forfeit for the loser of the game.

In the most basic version of the game, one contestant throws a knife end over end (i.e., tumbling) to stick it as deeply as possible into the ground, after which another player tries to extract it with his or her teeth.

There are many variants of the basic game. One relatively safe version is very similar to H-O-R-S-E basketball. Here, the first player attempts to stick his knife in the ground using some unusual technique, such as behind the back or off his knee. If he is successful, the second player must duplicate the feat. The other player is sometimes given more than one try. The game repeats until one player cannot duplicate the "trick". If there are multiple players then play continues to "knock out" a player until only one player remains. In some cases, just getting the knife to stick at all can be the objective but in others, the players attempt to stick their knives into the peg or as close to it as possible.

In the variant known as "Stretch," the object of the game is to make the other player fall over from having to spread his legs too far apart. The players begin facing each other some distance apart with their own heels and toes touching, and take turns attempting to stick their knives in the ground outboard of the other player's feet. If the knife sticks, the other player must move his foot out to where the knife stuck while keeping the other foot in place, provided the distance between foot and knife is about twelve inches or less. Play continues until one player falls or is unable to make the required stretch.

The highly dangerous "Chicken" variant is the opposite of "Stretch". Here, one player bets the other how many sticks he will allow the other to make between his feet. The betting player then stands with his feet as far apart as possible and the other player throws his knife into the gap between them. If the knife sticks, the betting player moves whichever foot is closer to the knife to where the knife stuck. Therefore, hitting as close to the center as possible is desirable to make the opponent's feet come close to each other with the fewest throws. The process repeats until either the agreed-upon number of sticks has been accomplished (betting player wins), either player refuses to go any further (whichever player did not "chicken out" wins), or the knife hits the betting player (betting player wins). Approximately halving the distance between the feet at each stick, five sticks is essentially the upper limit that still leaves the feet very slightly apart, so such bets are rarely made or taken.

== In popular culture ==
- Mark Twain's 1896 book Tom Sawyer, Detective describes "mumbletypeg" as one of boys' favorite outdoor games.
- In the 1925 film Too Many Kisses, Richard Dix's character demonstrates his contempt for the family business by playing the game in the office, with an office boy. Dix shows considerable skill. Later, in the wild Basque country, villain William Powell tries to intimidate Dix by throwing a short sword into a distant target. Dix shows off his mumbletypeg prowess, leaving Powell speechless. Villagers crowd around the table trying to imitate his tricks—with wicked-looking daggers and swords.
- In the opening of Robert A. Heinlein's 1948 short story "The Black Pits of Luna", the protagonist Dick Logan plays mumblety-peg with his younger brother in a hotel suite in Luna City. While he feels he's normally too old for the game, he allows that "[...] on the Moon, it's a right good game. The knife practically floats and you can do all kinds of things with it. We made up a lot of new rules."
- The H-O-R-S-E version of the game is shown in part one of the television miniseries Lonesome Dove between the characters Deets, Newt and Pea Eye.
- In the episode "A Nice Place to Visit" of The Twilight Zone, Sebastian Cabot's character Mr. Pip reminds Larry Blyden's character "Rocky" Valentine that as a child he was quite fond of mumblety-peg. In the episode "The Little People" of the same show, Joe Maross's character Peter Craig sarcastically mentions mumblety-peg as a game he would like to play.
- Andy Griffith and Don Knotts spent their spare time playing mumblety-peg backstage on the Broadway set of No Time for Sergeants, a bonding activity that bolstered their budding friendship in the mid-1950s.
- In the episode "Diogenes, Won't You Please Go Home?" (S1E31, 1965) of Gilligan's Island, Gilligan is witnessed throwing a bayonet onto the ground. When asked by The Skipper why he is doing that, Gilligan answers "mumbly-peg".

== See also ==
- Bloody knuckles
- Knife game
