= Pencil fighting =

Attack game played with pencils

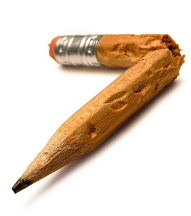
A broken pencil

Pencil fighting involves two players trying to break each other's pencils.

== Overview ==
Pencil fighting typically involves two players attempting to break each other's pencils. Players take turns in which one player holds their pencil horizontally with both hands while the other player flicks their pencil at it attempting to break it. The first player to break the other's pencil is the winner. Foul plays have been suggested, such as intentionally hitting a player on the fingers, dropping the pencil, and missing the pencil when striking. When a foul has occurred, the offender may be required to allow a free extra strike against their pencil.

== Risks ==
Some risk of eye injury exists in pencil fighting, because pieces of wood and graphite inside the pencil can be launched when pencils are struck.

== History ==
It has been suggested that pencil fighting became popular toward the end of the 1970s, played by students despite the disapproval of school educators, i.e., "the teachers who would commonly issue two pencils to each student at the beginning of the school year and later only as required."

Pencil fighting in the late 1970s was also and more commonly known as "Pencil Break", "Cracks" or "Pencils." Elementary, middle (junior high) school, and high school students played the game often. It was such a beloved activity, students would either purchase, seek out, and or trade certain brands of pencils, known for their design and durability characteristics, e.g., strength of the wood, ability to bend backwards without breaking, so as to develop the greatest possible amount of force. Often, students would simply walk up to classmates & hold one end of their pencil with both hands in a state of readiness. The other student almost instinctively knew and understood the meaning and request to play on sight. Students held word of mouth competitions before, after, and even during class in some instances; often near the back of a classroom, as students were required to line-up in order to use one of two industrial strength and wall mounted pencil sharpeners for regular pencil sharpening before, during, and after classes. Students sometimes would gather in small and even large circles and groups to play. Often, most one-on-one competitions were held on the school grounds, i.e., classroom hallways, in the school bathroom, in the school yard, next to and by the side or back of a class, while riding the school bus to and from school, and while on the way to events, trips, etc. Games commonly lasted less than half of one minute.

Pencil break was enjoyed most when the opponent's pencil was either new or freshly sharpened. However, the game was often played twice or several times, based on the final length left after a loss. A standard No. 2 pencil could be realistically broken four times by an expert player. Novice players required several strikes before their opponents pencil was broken if ever. Some players removed the rubber eraser, forming the metal clamp into an edged point that was able to concentrate the cutting, sawing, and breaking power for each strike. Other players might chew on their pencil, compressing the wood so as to make it tougher to break a pencil. In most cases however, superior technique and method over the type of pencil and any upgrade was the preferred approach to winning consistently. It was common for an advanced player's pencil to last over several games before his pencil broke.

== World Extreme Pencil Fighting League ==
The World Extreme Pencil Fighting League (WXPFL) was an organization and competitive league of pencil fighters based in Seattle, Washington that engages in pencil fighting competitions. WXPFL events include wrestling-style theatrics, and are held monthly at a Seattle bar named Re-Bar. Number 2 style pencils are used, and the referee is the only person allowed to distribute the pencils. The events are monitored by referees, and penalties exist for delaying the event, pencil tilting and dropping a pencil. Those called on a foul can have their pencil struck with any sized pencil, as long as "it’s made of wood and you can actually write with it". The competition includes a champion who holds a championship belt.
