= Trading blows =

Endurance test

Trading blows or trading licks is an endurance test in which the participants (usually two boys or young men) take turns, alternating between administering a blow to an opponent and assuming the agreed exposed position (e.g. bending over an object or grabbing the ankles) to endure the next one, using the same implement (e.g. a fraternity paddle), until only the winner can still bring himself to endure the gradually increasing pain in the progressively tormented target part of their anatomy (usually the posterior, in which case it is a form of spanking or the cheeks), which in the interest of fairness should be covered by a common uniform. This can be anything from regular jeans or pants, underwear, and finally, bared (naked) buttocks. As the blows are not given by the same person but by the parties themselves, the strongest-armed one actually has an unfair (but not always decisive) physical advantage.

Such rather macho displays of willpower, restraining the instinct to avoid pain, can serve various purposes, including:

- a physical punishment, especially for quarreling, possibly the origin of the practice (this ritualized alternative to a more disabling or even lethal duel should also make its participants realize the futility of physical aggression)
- a motivation test, especially as part of an initiation process, such as hazing
- an obedience test, as in certain paddle games (possibly really an excuse for the rather sadistic amusement of the seniors)
- a duel, either personal or as champions representing similar, especially rivaling, groups; in certain fraternities, refusing such a challenge may result in exclusion from the membership, even for an alumnus
- as a game, either to 'proudly' display one's tenacity (often to impress some audience) or in the pursuit of a sadist and/or masochistic, erotic or pain-addicted, kick.
- as a sexual fetish

Another game with the same name is often played among boys or young men, where two people agree on a place to hit the other (e.g. the shoulder or chest) and the two take turns trading punches until one person cannot stand the pain any longer. The first person to give up is the loser.

== See also ==
- One-upmanship

== Sources ==
- Game in a scout troop in St.Louis, Missouri in the 1950s- scroll to "the Baker paddle"
