= Girls' toys and games =

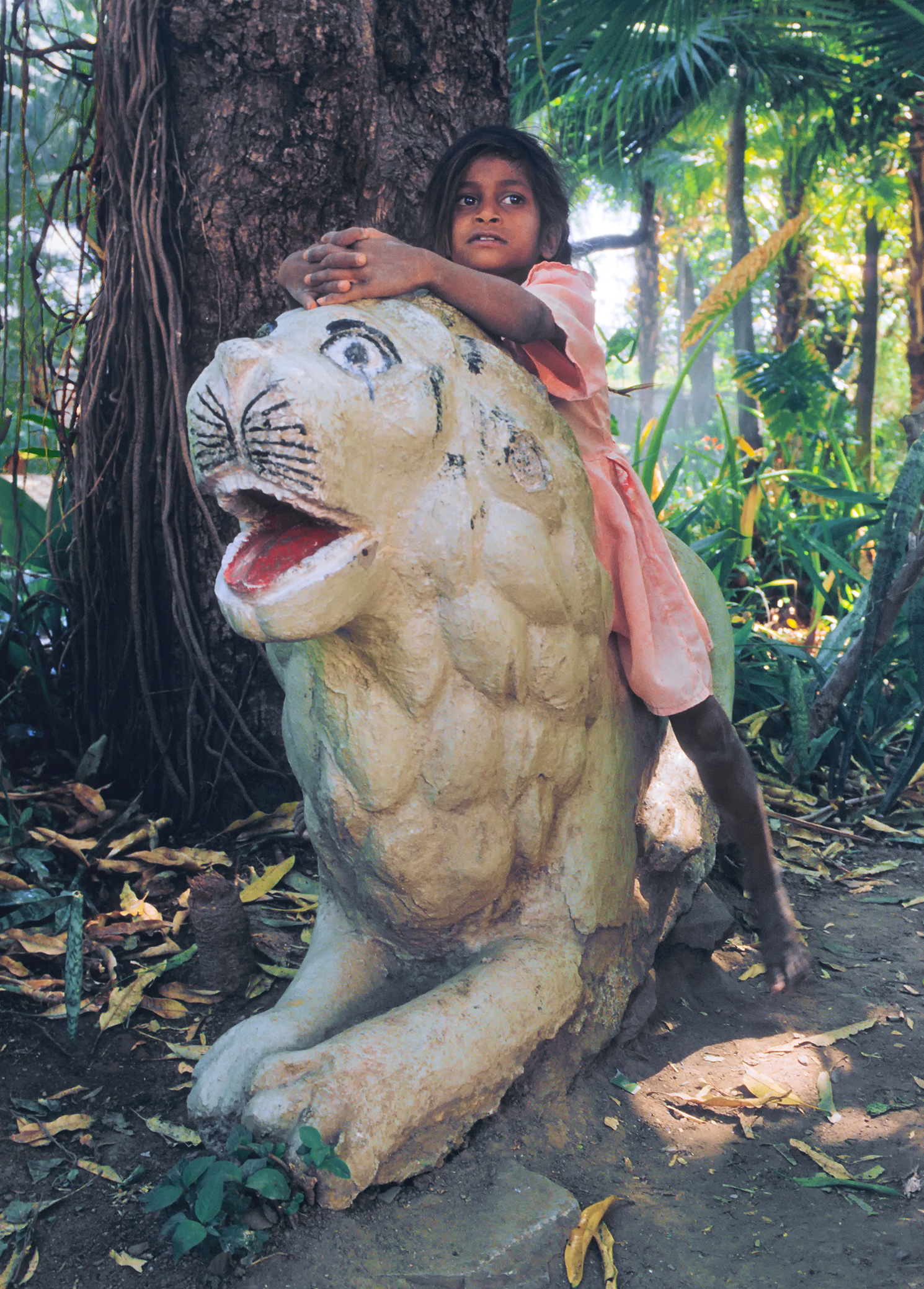
A girl in Udaipur playing "Jungle Child"

Girls' toys and games, as opposed to boys' toys and games, are toys and games specifically targeted at girls by the toy industry. They may be traditionally associated either exclusively or primarily with girls by adults and used by girls as an expression of identity.

== Background ==
Games and toys, or types of play, in many cultures are gender (and age) neutral, but some are given a gender role (masculine or feminine). Games given a gender role are exclusive or segregationist, and a game labelled as such is often considered by both children and adults as appropriate for boys or girls but not both. Members of a culture that designated a game's gender role, as well as outsiders, may have difficulty discerning why it has that gender role. Some games, such as many sports, are or were officially gender segregated, and the gender role given a toy or game may affect its marketing.

== Age compression ==
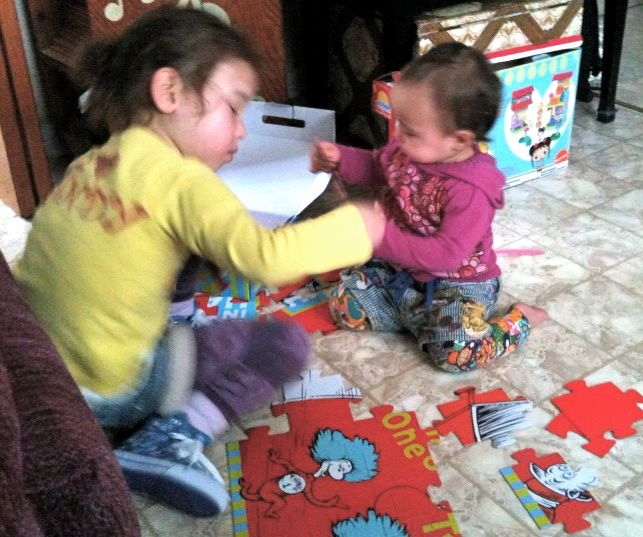
Girls assembling a puzzle

Age compression is the modern trend of children moving through play stages faster than they did in the past. Children have a desire to progress to more complex toys at a faster pace, girls in particular. Barbie dolls, for example, were once marketed to girls around 8 years old but have been found to be more popular in recent years with girls around 3 years old. The packaging for the dolls labels them appropriate for ages 3 and up. Boys, in contrast, apparently enjoy toys and games over a longer timespan, gravitating towards toys that meet their interest in assembling and disassembling mechanical toys, and toys that "move fast and things that fight". An industry executive points out that girls have entered the "tween" phase by the time they are 8 years old and want non-traditional toys, whereas boys have been maintaining an interest in traditional toys until they are 12 years old, meaning the traditional toy industry holds onto their boy customers for 50% longer than their girl customers.

Girls gravitate towards "music, clothes, make-up, television talent shows and celebrities". As young children are more exposed to and drawn to music intended for older children and teens, companies are having to rethink how they develop and market their products to them. Girls also demonstrate a longer loyalty to characters in toys and games marketed towards them. A variety of global toy companies have marketed themselves to this aspect of girls' development, for example, the Hello Kitty brand, and the Disney Princess franchise. Boys have shown an interest in computer games at an ever-younger age in recent years.

== Pink phenomenon ==
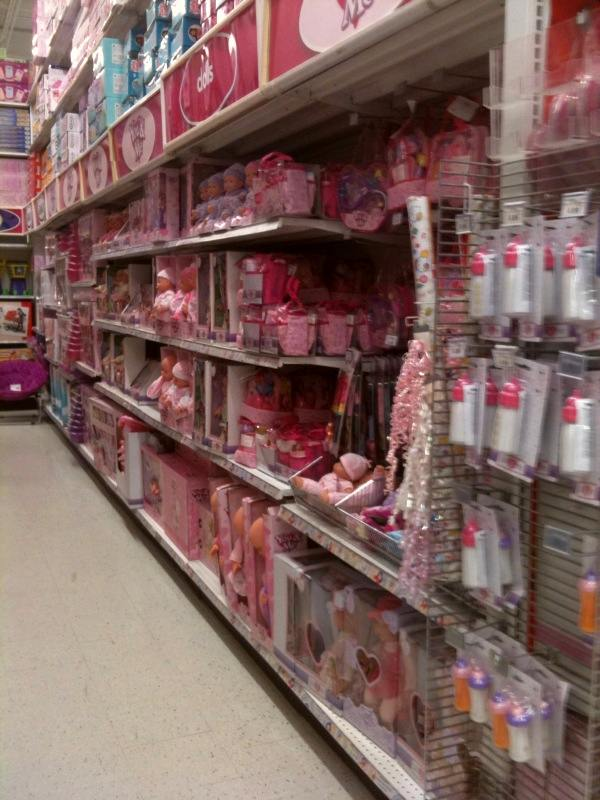
Rows of pink girls' toys in a Canadian store, 2011

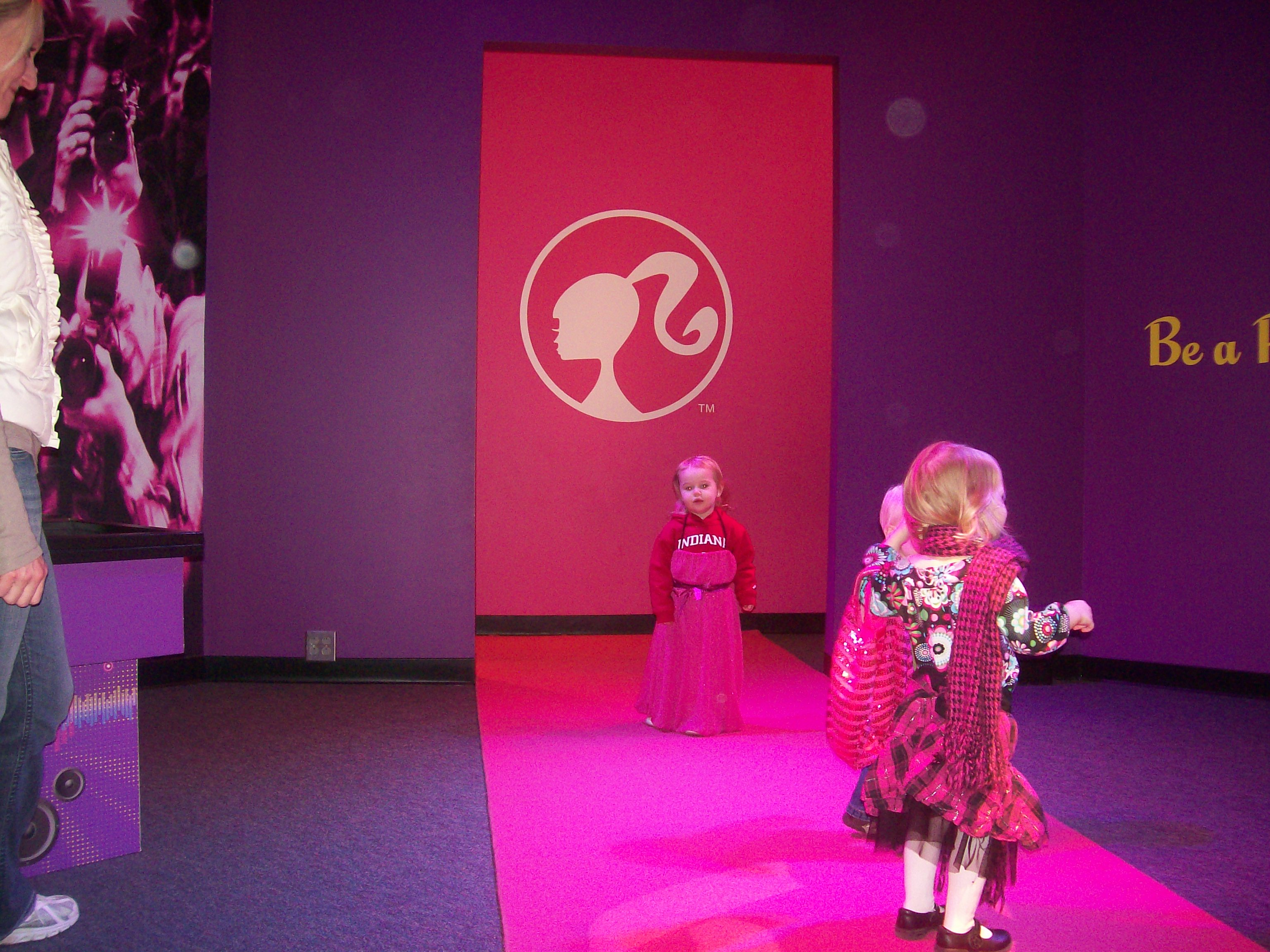
Girls in Barbie Fashion Show in Children's Museum of Indianapolis

In Western countries in recent years, girls' toys and games have shifted towards a dominant use of the colour pink. Those shopping for girls' toys can easily spot the girls' toy section in a store because of the rows of aisles almost entirely stacked with bright pink products. There has been a backlash against the predominant use of pink in girls' toys. One British parent launched a campaign called Pinkstinks against retailers marketing educational toys to girls in pink. The almost exclusive use of pink for girls' toys has raised concern that it is polarizing gender identity from an early age, to the detriment of girls, by over-emphasizing beauty and passivity over fun and creativity.

The reasons why girls may as a group prefer pink are not clear. Theories are divided between the nature versus nurture question. Social conditioning is one possible factor, since girls are surrounded by pink accessories and clothing from birth in some cultures. However, it has been proposed that a preference for pink is "hard-wired". One recent study showed "a marked preference for pink among girls and women in different cultures". Ben Goldacre has noted that it is likely to be cultural given that less than a hundred years ago pink was deemed the most appropriate colour for boys.

Amplifying gender identity differences between boys and girls is to the benefit of toy sellers. Targeted marketing has for many decades used the technique of categorizing children into segments for marketing purposes, much as the industry does with adults. Childhood age segments that are popularly believed to be identified by psychologists were in fact invented by children's clothing and toy manufacturers. Peggy Orenstein has drawn attention to research by Daniel Cook (a "historian of childhood consumerism"), that reveals the marketing origins of the age group known as "toddler":

Trade publications counselled department stores that, in order to increase sales, they should create a "third stepping stone" between infant wear and older kids' clothes. They also advised segregating girls' and boys' clothing no later than age two: parents whose sons were "treated like a little man" were thought to be looser with their purse strings. It was only after "toddler" became common shoppers' parlance that it evolved into a broadly accepted developmental stage.

== Tween marketing ==
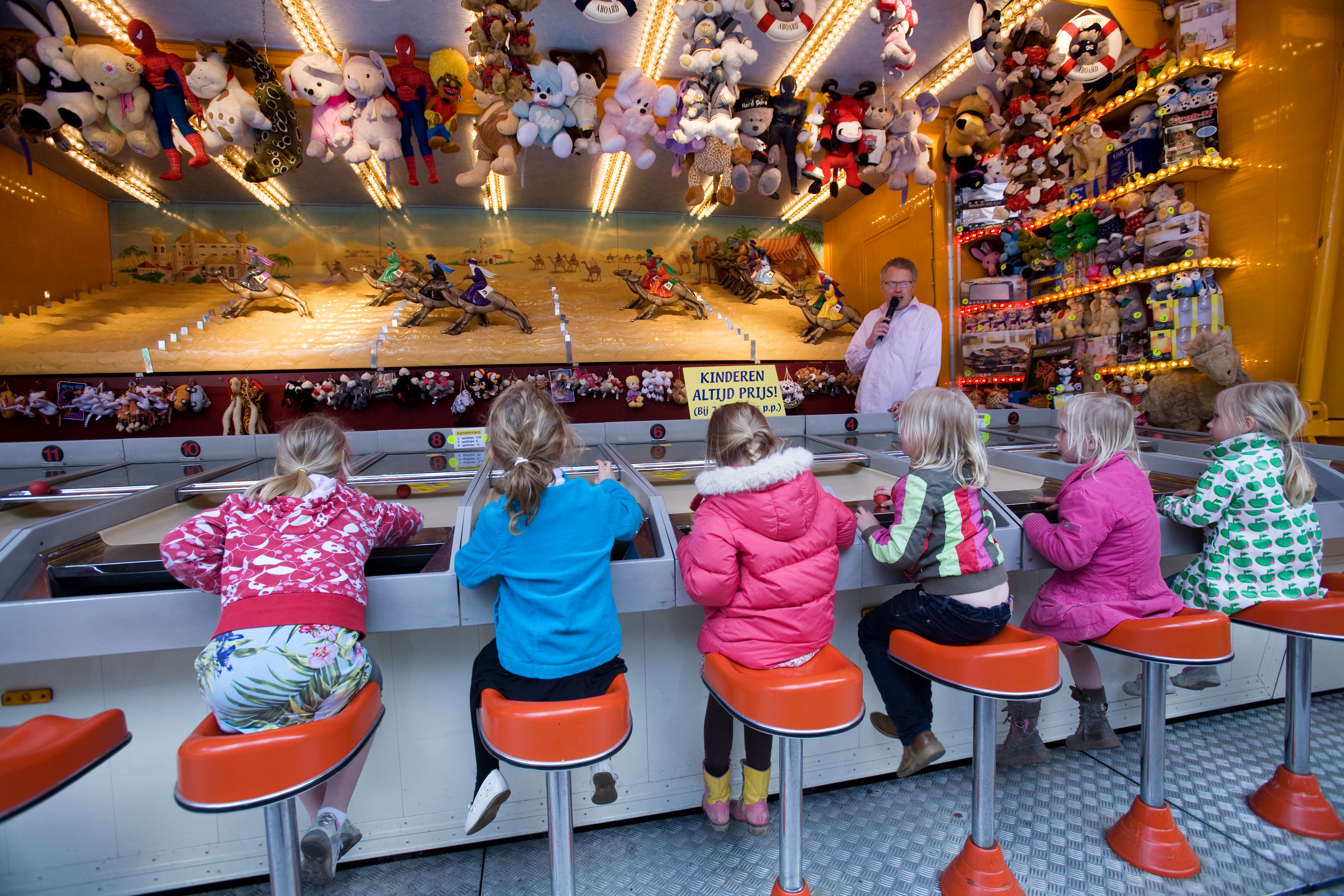
Girls playing in a park in the Netherlands

Similarly, the age group known as tweens was a marketing invention dating to the mid-1980s to describe children aged eight to 15. Tween marketing has spread beyond Western countries. In India, marketing research shows children in the 8- to 14-year-old age range, predominantly girls, shifting their preferences away from traditional products towards mass-marketed merchandise such as the Disney Princess and Frozen franchises.

Tween girls became identified as a huge market during the 1990s. The pop music group the Spice Girls were an act based on a group of female performers representing character traits, with nicknames such as Scary Spice, Baby Spice, and Sporty Spice. They were originally a less edgy variation on the girl-group character acts such as the Mary Jane Girls organized by Rick James and Vanity 6 created by Prince, with an intended teenage audience. To the surprise of the recording industry, the Spice Girls were an enormous success with prepubescent tween girls, who identified with the flirtatious sexuality of the group and the "Girl Power" theme, which marketers subsequently promoted to the hilt. In 1998, the year the Spice Girls enjoyed their peak success, tweens spent an estimated $1.4 billion, according to a YTV Tween report. Marketing to tween girls is a full-fledged entertainment industry trend today, with toys and merchandise associated with television shows, music groups and celebrities, for example Justin Bieber, Miley Cyrus and Selena Gomez.

In addition to toys such as dolls marketing to girls, they use common ideas and representations of toys that will make the biggest profits. Taking a look at Barbie dolls, there are many different editions of Barbie that make tributes to celebrities and other aspects of culture. Some of these editions include Marilyn Monroe, Diana Ross, Audrey Hepburn, Harley Davidson, and many more. The company Mattel uses idea they know will sell best, in addition to this they make sure the dolls have a certain appearance; small waist, thin legs, and large breasts. They are marketing not only what gives the biggest dollar value, but as well as following the guidelines for typical views of beauty within these types of toys. The toys along with the messages they send about body images are then mass produced to be sold to the audience of mostly girls ranging from toddlers to tweens. The dolls often lack many features that would help make them more realistic, and send believable body image message to girls. Some of the features neglected to be shown on dolls such as Barbie's include: nipples, wombs, skin flaws, and the various skin tones found around the globe. This leaves the realistic view of women out, and instead changes it for blank features that is wanted by the public.

== Technology and toys ==
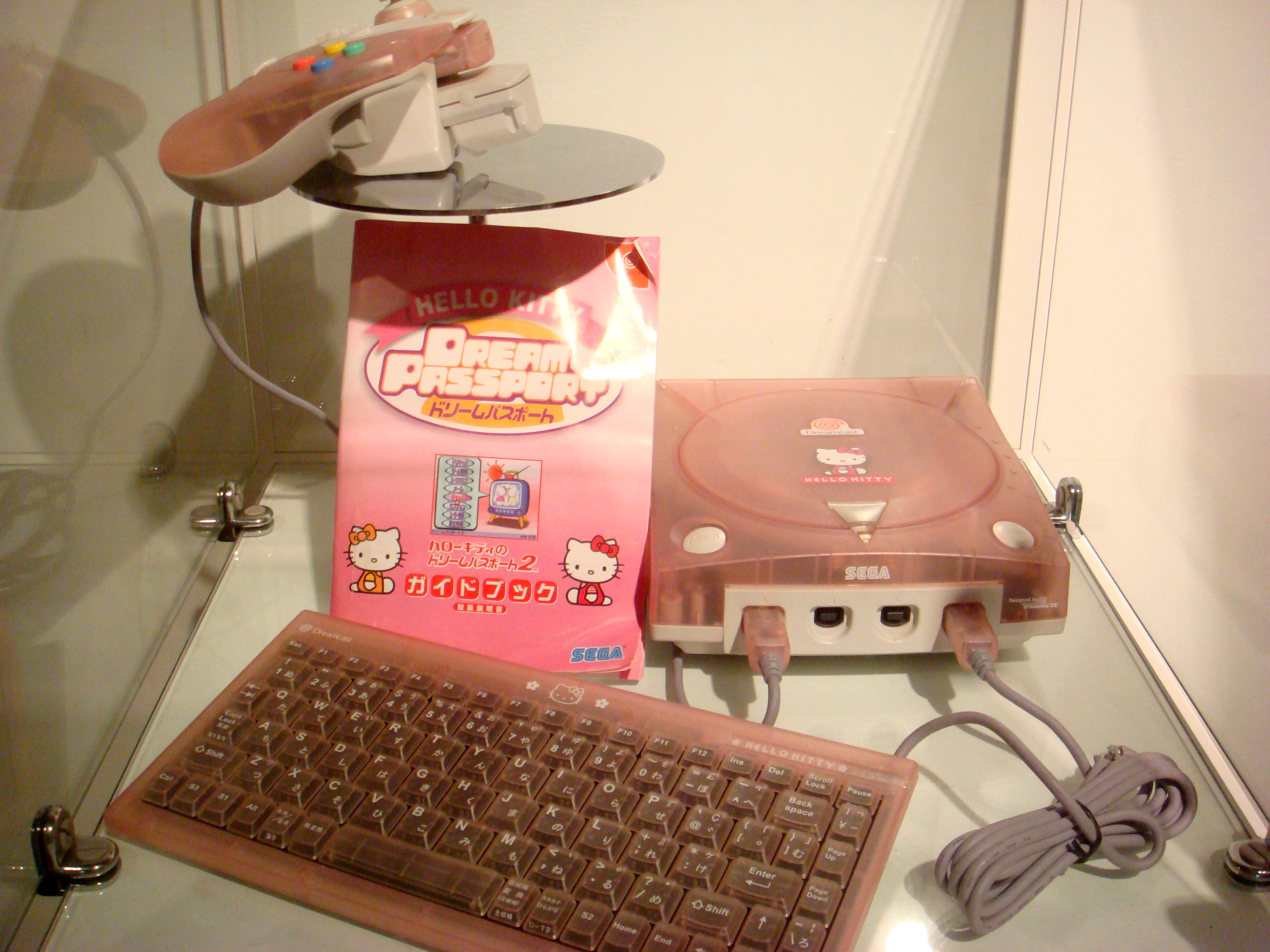
Hello Kitty Dreamcast set, 2009

Technology has been embraced by many toy companies because of the gender-neutral best-selling toys that it helps create. One example is the popular Tamagotchi toy invented in Japan in the 1990s. It has sold tens of millions of units worldwide in its various versions. The Tamagotchi is an egg-shaped computerized toy that mimics a pet, and requires that the user update it regularly to feed it and provide other care. It remains particularly popular with young girls, however, and recent marketing is targeted towards girls; girls "like the new outfits and other items that can be downloaded via cellphone and transferred to their Tamagotchi device".

Girls' video games were a trend in the 1990s where video game developers attempted to make video games aimed specifically at girls. The genre did not see much critical or commercial success, and a leading developer, Purple Moon, was bought by Mattel in 1999.

In 2014, Moose Toys developed Shopkins toys which are about one inch in size and targeted at girls. Shopkins later released a number of Shopkins games for Android and iOS devices, and in Adobe Flash format. The most popular game in the series is Shopkins World, which crossed 5 million downloads.

Worldwide video game sales have soared beyond traditional toy and game sales in the past decade, particularly in North America and the Middle East. The Nintendo Wii console sells games aimed at either girls or boys, or both. Large traditional toy companies such as Hasbro have also created game applications for the iPhone and other smartphones, which are increasingly being used by children in affluent countries.

=== STEM toys ===
In 2020, the Australian market research group PLAY reported that STEM toys (science, technology, engineering, and mathematics) were trending in the toy industry, specifically those aimed at young girls. Traditionally these toys have been solely marketed towards boys, with both masculine explicit and implicit labels. "Pinkification" is a common strategy used in marketing to create a binary or segment the toy market by colour. This is seen in girls’ toy brands like Barbie, but it is also apparent in some of the new rebranding efforts of STEM toy makers, like GoldieBlox and Lego, who are trying to appeal to feminine audiences. While it might be a “good faith attempt at progress it could remind girls to shun anything that isn’t pink.” and be a limiting factor both girls, and the boys who may avoid pink packaging altogether. A study by Coyle and Liben examined the effects of gender–typed packaging in STEM toys on mother-child dyads. This study found that children had differential comfort with toys packaged for their own experienced gender but resulted less attention and mastery of the specific STEM concept. Girls were found to generally learn the concept better playing with the masculine version but were freer to play and explore the pieces with original version, and vice versa for boys.

== History ==
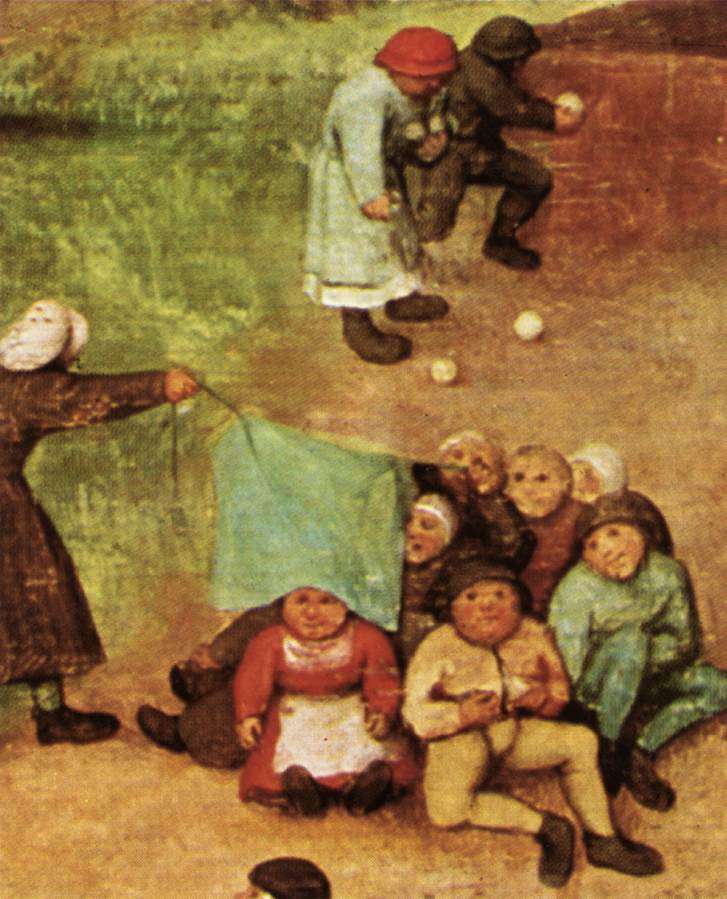
Detail from Children's Games by Pieter Bruegel the Elder (1560), showing Flemish girls playing popular games of the era

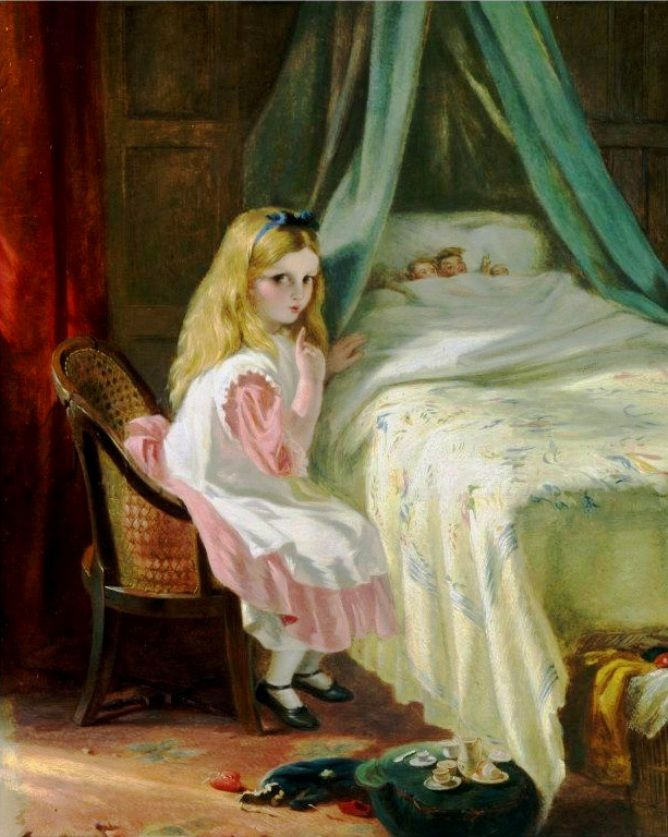
Paintings of girl with dolls

The oldest toys for girls are dolls that date from around 2000 BCE in Egypt. Children in Ancient Greece played with dolls made of rags, wood, wax or clay, sometimes with moveable arms and legs. Rattles, hoops and yo-yos were other common toys. When a young woman was to be married in Ancient Greece, she would sacrifice her dolls and toys and other youthful possessions to Artemis the night before her wedding.

Children's games during the Middle Ages and earlier are something of a mystery, since the rules of the games were passed from generation to generation orally. In rare cases, the games survived long enough to be recorded in later centuries. Pieter Bruegel's painting Children's Games (1560) depicts many games popular with Flemish children of the time. Girls can be shown playing games that involve balls, musical instruments, and games that involved carrying other children or performing other challenges. Hide-and-seek, leapfrog and tag are some perennially popular games that seem to have survived over the centuries in Europe and North America.

Fashion dolls were creations used by adults in early modern Europe. Fashion dolls were prototype samples of clothing styles, passed between adults who were involved in designing or purchasing expensive dresses and suits. Once the dolls were outdated, they were apparently given to girls as toys. A recent trend in the Barbie doll line in particular is to produce "collectors" versions of the doll marketed to adults, with Barbie wearing historic couture reproductions.

Board games, paper dolls, doll houses and other toys were creations of the Victorian era that remain popular today. Other historic and vintage girls' pastimes include Paper fortune tellers, which date from the 1920s.

== See also ==
- Bratz
- Toy museum
