= February 1974 United Kingdom general election in England =

- 28 February 1974

All 516 English seats in the House of Commons
- Turnout: 79.0% (▲7.6 pp)
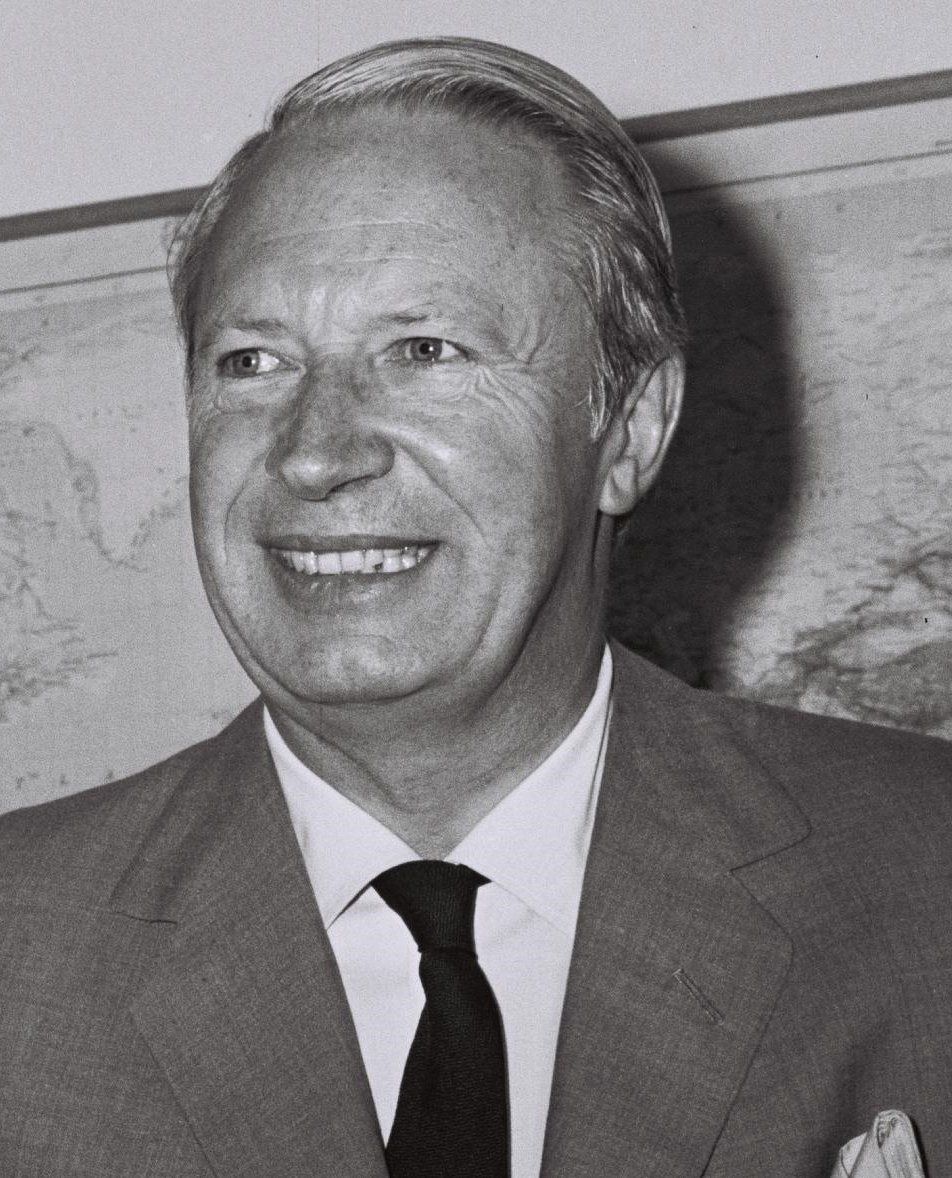

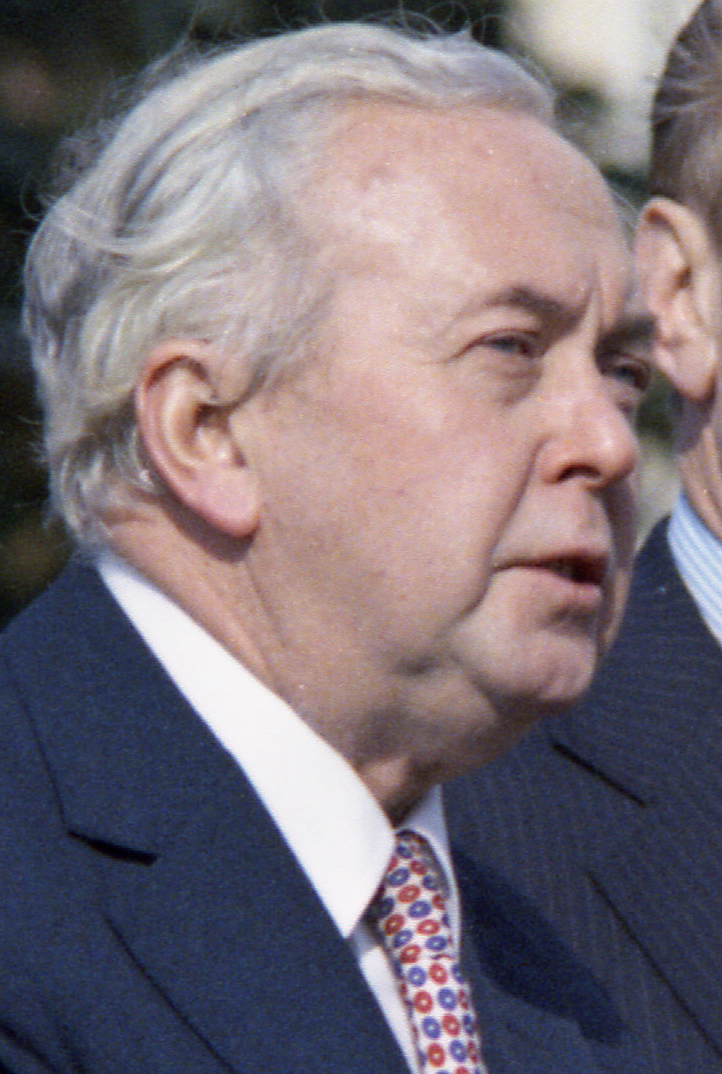
	First party	Second party	Third party
			Lib
Leader	Edward Heath	Harold Wilson	Jeremy Thorpe
Party	Conservative	Labour	Liberal
Leader since	28 July 1965	14 February 1963	18 January 1967
Leader's seat	Sidcup	Huyton	North Devon
Last election	292 seats, 48.3%	217 seats, 43.4%	2 seats, 7.9%
Seats before	302†	212†	2†
Seats won	268 (Note: Figure includes Speaker of the House of Commons Selwyn Lloyd in Wirral.)	237	9
Seat change	▼34*	▲25*	▲7*
Popular vote	10,508,977	9,842,468	5,574,934
Percentage	40.2%	37.7%	21.3%
Swing	▼8.1 pp	▼5.8 pp	▲13.4 pp
- ^{†}Notional 1970 results if held on the 1974 boundaries *Indicates boundary change—so this is a notional figure.

On Thursday 28 February 1974, the February 1974 United Kingdom general election was held in England, to elect all 635 members of the House of Commons, with 516 constituencies being in England.

When combined with results from across the UK, the election resulted in a hung parliament, the first since 1929. Labour, led by Leader of the Opposition and former Prime Minister Harold Wilson, ended up as the largest party, but seventeen short of an overall majority. The Conservatives, led by incumbent Prime Minister Edward Heath, lost 28 seats (though they polled a higher share of the vote than Labour). Heath sought a coalition with the Liberals, but the two parties failed to come to an agreement and so Wilson became prime minister for a second time, his first with a minority government. Wilson called another early election in September, which was held in October and resulted in a slim Labour majority.

== Boundary Review ==
As part of the second periodic review of Westminster constituencies, the boundaries were changed in England, with the number of constituencies being increased from the 511 used between 1955 and 1970, to 516 seats. As a result, the Conservative Party notionally held 302 seats in England compared with Labour's 212 on a notional basis. The Liberal Party and all other parties were, in essence, unaffected in terms of seats.

There were also significant changes in around two thirds of the constituency boundaries in England and the wider United Kingdom, and there was an alignment towards the new ceremonial county boundaries established in the 1974 local government reforms, particularly in Greater London.

== Candidates ==
Below is a table summarising the candidates of the February 1974 general election in England.

Affiliation	Candidates
Labour Party	516
Conservative and Unionist Party	516
Liberal Party	452
National Front	54
Independent	29
Communist Party of Great Britain	23
Independent Conservative	18 (Note: Includes 5 candidates that stood as Powellite Conservatives in Bradford South, South West Norfolk, St Marylebone, Gloucester and Stroud.)
Workers Revolutionary Party	7
Other	59
Total	1,674

== Analysis ==
=== Labour and Conservatives ===
As a result of the extensive changes in constituency boundaries, the Conservative Party had held ten more seats than it had won in 1970 by way of notional wins. However, in England, the Conservatives won 268 seats to Labour's 237. The Conservative Party lost several seats to the Labour Party, however managed to take Brentford and Isleworth, Acton and Bromsgrove and Redditch from Labour. This was brought about in a loss of 37 seats but with a gain of three. Amongst the Conservative Party's gains were Upminster in its creation as a new seat, along with the newly created North West Norfolk. 32 of the Conservative's losses went to the Labour Party.

In the House of Commons, when combined with the national results, there emerged a hung parliament with the Labour Party winning 301 seats to the 297 won by the Conservative Party.

The Labour Party led by former prime minister Harold Wilson formed a minority government on 4 March 1974 after the incumbent Conservative government led by Prime Minister Edward Heath failed to form a coalition government with the Liberal Party led by Jeremy Thorpe, whose party saw a national resurgence. As no party commanded a majority, a second general election was held in October in which the Labour Party gained a wafer-thin majority in the House of Commons. However, even in that election, Labour failed to win a majority of seats in England, winning just two seats more than the defeated Conservatives.

Notable figures who entered Parliament in English seats included future Chancellor of the Exchequer Nigel Lawson in Blaby and Jonathan Aitken in East Thanet for the Conservatives.

=== Liberal Party ===
The Liberal Party saw a resurgence in England, with a large increase in vote share, which matched what had occurred in Scotland and Wales. The party held North Cornwall, with Leader of the Liberal Party Jeremy Thorpe retaining North Devon.

The Liberal Party won the seats of Bodmin, Isle of Wight and Berwick-upon-Tweed from the Conservatives, along with notionally wining the seat of Hazel Grove from the Conservatives. It held the seat of Isle of Ely, which it had won in the 1973 Isle of Ely by-election. The Liberal candidate Clement Freud holding the seat represented a gain from the Conservatives compared with the previous election. It also won Colne Valley from the Labour Party (with Richard Wainwright re-entering Parliament). It won Rochdale by way of retaining the seat in this election from the 1972 Rochdale by-election. As such, the party grew from two to nine seats in England.

=== Minor candidates ===
Amongst the candidates other than those in Labour, the Conservatives or the Liberal Party, former Labour Party MP Dick Taverne had formed the Democratic Labour Party following his de-selection by the Labour Party. Taverne re-contested his seat of Lincoln and therefore represented a gain from the Labour Party. He would narrowly lose the seat at the next election to Labour.

Separately, in Blyth Valley, another former Labour Member of Parliament, Eddie Milne, re-contested his seat as an Independent Labour candidate. He won the seat, however would also lose to Labour at the following election, and unsuccessfully re-contest the seat in 1979.

== Results ==
Party	Seats					Aggregate votes		
Party	Total	Gains	Losses	Net	Of all (%)	Total	Of all (%)	Change (%)
Conservative	268	3	37	▼34	51.9	10,508,977	40.2	▼8.1
Labour	237	32	7	▲25	45.9	9,842,468	37.7	▼5.8
Liberal	9	7	0	▲7	1.7	5,574,934	21.3	▲13.4
National Front	0	0	0	Steady	—	76,865	0.3	▲0.3
Independent	0	0	0	Steady	—	25,198	0.1	Steady
Independent Labour	1	Did not stand in 1970		▲1	0.2	22,918	0.1	—N/a
Independent Liberal	0	0	0	Steady	—	21,172	0.1	▲0.1
Democratic Labour	1	New		▲1	0.2	14,780	0.1	New
Communist	0	0	0	Steady	—	13,379	0.1	Steady
Ind. Conservative	0	0	0	Steady	—	10,338	0.0	Steady
PEOPLE	0	New			—	4,576	0.0	New
Workers Revolutionary	0	New			—	3,979	0.0	New
Social Democracy	0	New			—	2,646	0.0	New
Independent Democratic	0	New			—	1,976	0.0	New
National Independence	0	New			—	1,602	0.0	New
Anti-EEC	0	New			—	1,447	0.0	Steady
Marxist-Leninist (England)	0	New			—	1,419	0.0	New
Anti-Immigration	0	0	0	Steady	—	1,164	0.0	Steady
National Democratic	0	0	0	Steady	—	1,161	0.0	Steady
Ind. Labour Party	0	0	0	Steady	—	991	0.0	Steady
Democratic Christian	0	New			—	875	0.0	New
Mebyon Kernow	0	0	0	Steady	—	850	0.0	Steady
Democratic Conservative	0	New			—	720	0.0	New
British Movement	0	0	0	Steady	—	711	0.0	Steady
Ind. Social Democrat	0	New			—	661	0.0	New
Ind. Socialist	0	New			—	628	0.0	New
International Marxist	0	New			—	626	0.0	New
Labour and Democrat	0	New			—	570	0.0	New
Wessex Regionalists	0	New			—	521	0.0	New
English National	0	New			—	482	0.0	—N/a
National Coalition	0	New			—	463	0.0	New
Independent Progressive	0	Did not stand in 1970			—	337	0.0	—N/a
Anti-Helmet	0	New			—	310	0.0	New
Anti-Common Market Conservative	0	New			—	288	0.0	New
Independent Democrat	0	New			—	254	0.0	New
More Prosperous Britain	0	New			—	234	0.0	New
UK Front	0	New			—	228	0.0	New
New Freedom	0	New			—	203	0.0	—N/a
British Exports Campaign	0	New			—	191	0.0	New
Community	0	New			—	151	0.0	New
World Government	0	New			—	118	0.0	New
Social Credit	0	0	0	Steady	—	106	0.0	Steady
Technical Consultant	0	New			—	101	0.0	New
Blank and invalid votes						32,208	—	—
Total	516			0	100.0	26,141,618 (Note: All valid votes excluding spoiled votes.)	100.0	0.0
Registered voters, and turnout						33,077,573	79.0	▲7.6

Popular vote
Conservative	40.2%
Labour	37.7%
Liberal	21.3%
Other	0.8%

Parliament seats
Conservative	51.9%
Labour	45.9%
Liberal	1.7%
Other	0.4%

== By region ==
Note: the following tables indicate the results according to the regions of England which were established in 1994. These regions were not used at the time for the purposes of this election.

The number of seats for each region that were changed under the second periodic review of Westminster constituencies are indicated respectively.

=== East Midlands ===
Party	Seats					Aggregate votes		
Party	Total	Gains	Losses	Net	Of all (%)	Total	Of all (%)	Change (%)
Conservative	19	—N/a		Steady	48.7	—N/a	40.8	▼7.5
Labour	19	—N/a		▲1	48.7	—N/a	40.7	▼6.8
Liberal	0	0	0	Steady	0.0	—N/a	16.8	▲12.3
Others	1 (Note: This seat was retained by Dick Taverne for the Democratic Labour Party in Lincoln. Taverne retained the seat in the 1973 Lincoln by-election against Labour after the previous election following his de-selection and resignation, though had held Lincoln for the Labour Party in 1970.)	0	0	Steady	2.6	—N/a	1.8	▲1.3
Total	39			▲1		—N/a		

=== East of England ===
Party	Seats					Aggregate votes		
Party	Total	Gains	Losses	Net	Of all (%)	Total	Of all (%)	Change (%)
Conservative	35	0	2	▼2	77.8	—N/a	41.2	▼11.0
Labour	9	5	0	▲5	20.0	—N/a	33.1	▼7.1
Liberal	1	1	0	▲1	2.2	—N/a	25.5	▲18.1
Others	0	0	0	Steady	0.0	—N/a	0.2	Steady
Total	45			▲4		—N/a		

=== Greater London ===
Party	Seats					Aggregate votes		
Party	Total	Gains	Losses	Net	Of all (%)	Total	Of all (%)	Change (%)
Labour	50	—N/a		▼5	54.3	—N/a	40.5	▼5.3
Conservative	42	—N/a		▼5	45.7	—N/a	37.6	▼9.0
Liberal	0	0	0	Steady	0.0	—N/a	20.7	▲13.8
Others	0	0	0	Steady	0.0	—N/a	1.2	▲0.5
Total	92			▼10		—N/a		

Greater London

=== North East England ===
Party	Seats					Aggregate votes		
Party	Total	Gains	Losses	Net	Of all (%)	Total	Of all (%)	Change (%)
Labour	25	0	1	▼1	80.6	—N/a	52.4	▼7.2
Conservative	4	0	1	▼1	12.9	—N/a	33.4	▼4.8
Liberal	1	1	0	▲1	3.2	—N/a	12.4	▲10.2
Others	1	1 (Note: Eddie Milne won Blyth Valley against Labour as an independent after being de-selected by the Labour Party.)	0	▲1	3.2	—N/a	1.8	▲1.8
Total	31			Steady		—N/a		

=== North West England ===
Party	Seats					Aggregate votes		
Party	Total	Gains	Losses	Net	Of all (%)	Total	Of all (%)	Change (%)
Labour	51	8	1	▲7	62.2	—N/a	41.5	▼4.2
Conservative	29	0	10	▼10	35.4	—N/a	38.5	▼8.2
Liberal	2	2	0	▲2	2.4	—N/a	19.3	▲12.1
Others	0	0	0	Steady	0.0	—N/a	0.7	▲0.3
Total	82			▼1		—N/a		

=== South East England ===
Party	Seats					Aggregate votes		
Party	Total	Gains	Losses	Net	Of all (%)	Total	Of all (%)	Change (%)
Conservative	64	—N/a		▲6	91.4	—N/a	46.8	▼7.7
Labour	5	—N/a		▲2	7.1	—N/a	25.2	▼6.9
Liberal	1	1	0	▲1	1.4	—N/a	27.5	▲14.7
Others	0	0	0	Steady	0.0	—N/a	0.4	▼0.3
Total	70			▲9		—N/a		

=== South West England ===
Party	Seats					Aggregate votes		
Party	Total	Gains	Losses	Net	Of all (%)	Total	Of all (%)	Change (%)
Conservative	36	—N/a		▼1	78.3	—N/a	43.8	▼7.7
Labour	7	—N/a		▲1	15.2	—N/a	26.4	▼7.4
Liberal	3	1	0	▲1	6.5	—N/a	29.5	▲15.0
Others	0	0	0	Steady	0.0	—N/a	0.4	▲0.3
Total	46			▲1		—N/a		

=== West Midlands ===
Party	Seats					Aggregate votes		
Party	Total	Gains	Losses	Net	Of all (%)	Total	Of all (%)	Change (%)
Labour	33	9	0	▲9	58.9	—N/a	43.1	▼1.8
Conservative	23	0	7	▼7	41.1	—N/a	40.8	▼9.7
Liberal	0	0	0	Steady	0.0	—N/a	14.9	▲10.7
Others	0	0	0	Steady	0.0	—N/a	1.1	▲0.7
Total	56			▲2		—N/a		

=== Yorkshire and the Humber ===
Party	Seats					Aggregate votes		
Party	Total	Gains	Losses	Net	Of all (%)	Total	Of all (%)	Change (%)
Labour	38	3	1	▲2	69.1	—N/a	44.7	▼5.5
Conservative	16	0	4	▼4	29.1	—N/a	35.2	▼6.6
Liberal	1	1	0	▲1	1.8	—N/a	19.5	▲11.7
Others	0	0	0	Steady	0.0	—N/a	0.6	▲0.3
Total	55			▼1		—N/a		

== See also ==
- February 1974 United Kingdom general election in Scotland
- February 1974 United Kingdom general election in Wales
- February 1974 United Kingdom general election in Northern Ireland
