= February 1974 United Kingdom general election in Scotland =

- 28 February 1974

All 71 Scottish seats to the House of Commons
- Turnout: 79.0% (▲4.9 pp)
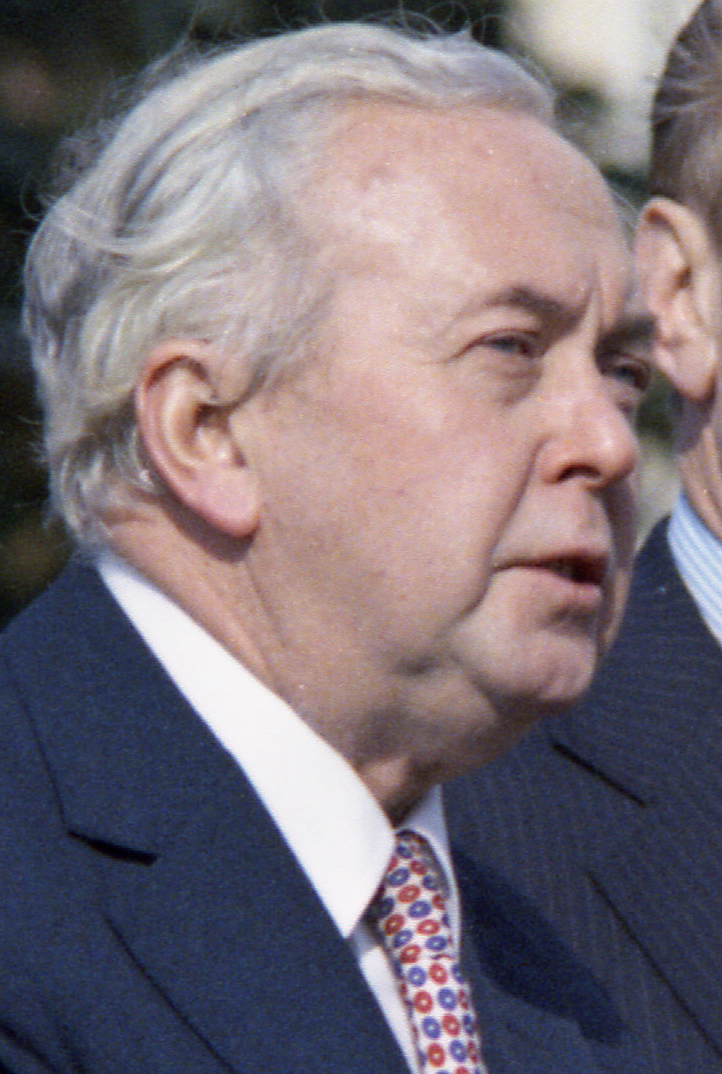

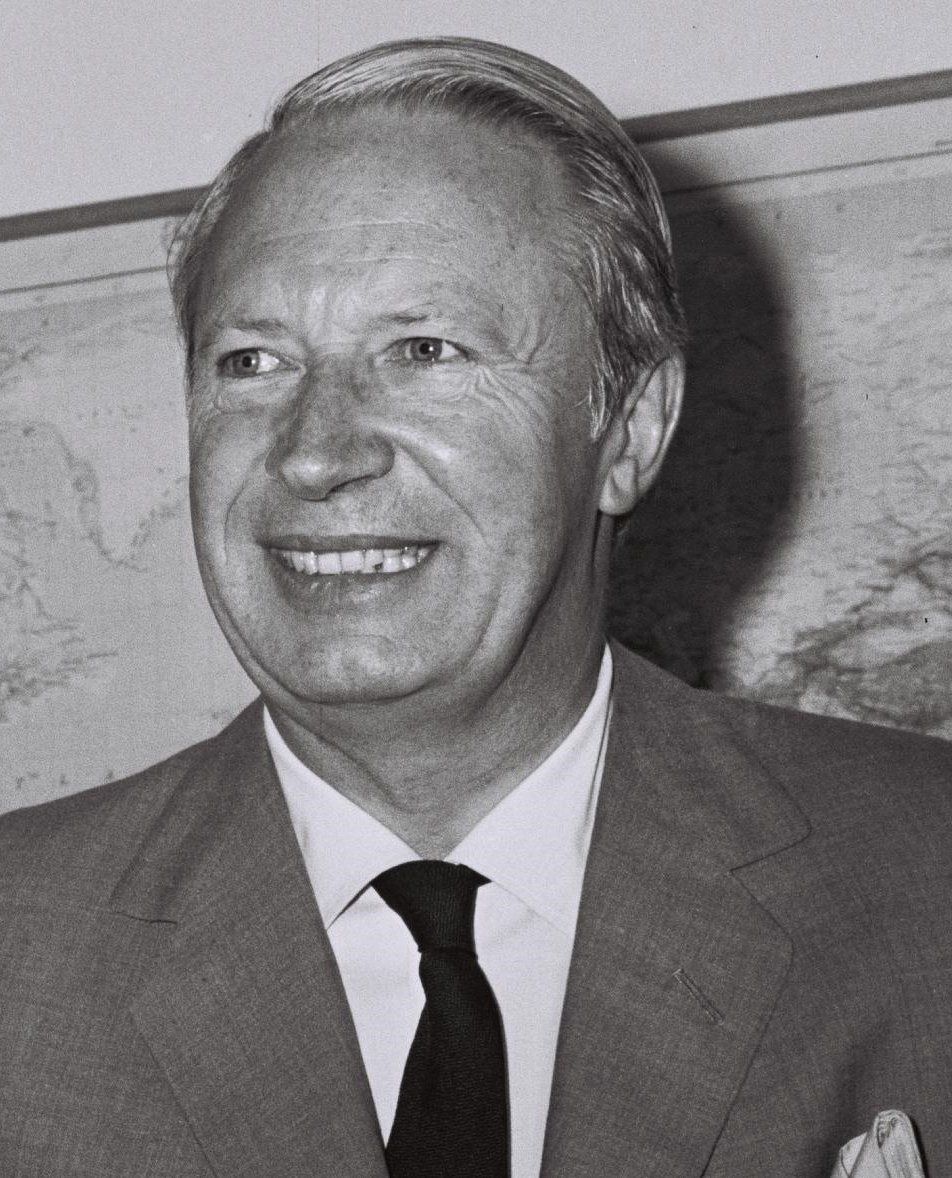
	First party	Second party
Leader	Harold Wilson	Edward Heath
Party	Labour	Conservative
Leader since	14 February 1963	28 July 1965
Leader's seat	Huyton	Sidcup
Last election	44 seats, 44.5%	23 seats, 38.0%
Seats before	43^{†}	24^{†}
Seats won	40	21
Seat change	▼3*	▼3*
Popular vote	1,057,601	950,668
Percentage	36.6%	32.9%
Swing	▼7.9 pp	▼5.1 pp
	Third party	Fourth party
	SNP	Lib
Leader	William Wolfe	Jeremy Thorpe
Party	SNP	Liberal
Alliance		Liberal
Leader since	1 June 1969	18 January 1967
Leader's seat	Ran in West Lothian (defeated)	North Devon
Last election	1 seat, 11.4%	3 seats, 5.5%
Seats before	1^{†}	3^{†}
Seats won	7	3
Seat change	▲6*	*
Popular vote	633,180	229,162
Percentage	21.9%	7.9%
Swing	▲10.5 pp	▲2.4 pp
- ^{†}Notional 1970 results if held on the 1974 boundaries *Indicates boundary change—so this is a notional figure.

On Thursday 28 February 1974, the February 1974 United Kingdom general election was held in Scotland, to elect all 635 members of the House of Commons, with 71 constituencies being in Scotland.

When combined with results from across the United Kingdom, the election resulted in a hung parliament, the first since 1929. Labour, led by Leader of the Opposition and former Prime Minister Harold Wilson, ended up as the largest party, but seventeen short of an overall majority. The Conservatives, led by incumbent Prime Minister Edward Heath, lost 28 seats (though they polled a higher share of the vote than Labour). Heath sought a coalition with the Liberals, but the two parties failed to come to an agreement and so Wilson became prime minister for a second time, his first with a minority government. Wilson called another early election in September, which was held in October and resulted in a slim Labour majority.

== Boundary Review ==
As part of the second periodic review of Westminster constituencies, the boundaries were changed in Wales, with the number of constituencies being unchanged in number to those used between 1955 and 1970. There were also significant changes to many of the 71 constituency boundaries in Scotland, and more widely across the United Kingdom.

As a result, the Conservative Party notionally held 24 seats in England compared with Labour's 43 on a notional basis (one change between the two major parties). The Liberal Party and Scottish National Party were, in essence, unaffected in terms of seats.

== Candidates ==
Below is a table summarising the candidates of the February 1974 general election in Scotland.

Affiliation	Candidates
Labour Party	71
Conservative and Unionist Party	71
Scottish National Party	70
Scottish Liberal Party	34
Communist Party of Great Britain	15
Workers Revolutionary Party	1 (Note: Candidate S. Hammond stood in Central Dunbartonshire.)
United Labour Party	1 (Note: Candidate Malcolm Macmillan stood in Western Isles.)
International Marxist Group	1 (Note: Candidate Robert McGoven Purdie stood in Glasgow Queen's Park.)
Christian Democratic Socialist	1 (Note: Candidate James Gourlay stood in Dundee East.)
Total	265

== Analysis ==
The Labour Party won almost twice as many Scottish seats as the Conservative Party, although both main parties suffered a drop in seats and vote share compared to the previous election. However, the Conservatives won Berwick and East Lothian and East Dunbartonshire from the Labour Party. As such, combined with losses both parties suffered to the SNP, the Conservatives lost two seats with Labour losing four in total. The Labour Party won the seat of Lanark, due to it being notionally won by the Conservatives on the new boundaries in 1970.

Between the Conservatives and Labour, the Conservative Party lost three seats notionally when compared with the previous election, including some to the Scottish National Party. The Labour Party also lost three seats when compared to the previous election, including two also to the SNP.

When combined with results from across the UK, the election resulted in a hung parliament, the first since 1929. Labour, led by Leader of the Opposition and former Prime Minister Harold Wilson, ended up as the largest party, but seventeen short of an overall majority. The Conservatives, led by incumbent Prime Minister Edward Heath, lost 28 seats (though they polled a higher share of the vote than Labour). Heath sought a coalition with the Liberals, but the two parties failed to come to an agreement and so Wilson became prime minister for a second time, his first with a minority government. Wilson called another early election in September, which was held in October and resulted in a slim Labour majority.

The Scottish Liberal Party increased its vote share and retained its seat in Inverness, with former Leader of the Liberal Party Jo Grimond retaining Orkney and Shetland and future Leader David Steel retaining Roxburgh, Selkirk and Peebles.

The Scottish National Party achieved significant success at the election by increasing its share of the popular vote in Scotland from 11% to 22%, and its number of MPs from one to seven. They had campaigned widely on the political slogan "It's Scotland's oil" following the discovery of North Sea oil off the coast of Scotland. In terms of seats, the SNP retained its single seat in Western Isles. It also won Argyllshire, Banffshire, East Aberdeenshire and Moray and Nairn from the Conservatives, as well as Clackmannan and Eastern Stirlingshire and Dundee East from the Labour Party.

== Results ==
Party	Seats					Aggregate votes		
Party	Total	Gains	Losses	Net	Of total (%)	Total	Of total (%)	Change (%)
Labour	40	1	4	▼3	56.3	1,057,601	36.6	▼7.9
Conservative	21	2	5	▼3	29.6	950,668	32.9	▼5.1
SNP	7	6	0	▲6	9.9	633,180	21.9	▲10.5
Liberal	3	0	0	Steady	4.2	229,162	7.9	▲2.4
Communist	0	0	0	Steady	—	15,071	0.5	▲0.1
United Labour Party	0	New			—	1,031	0.0	New
Christian Democratic Socialist	0	New			—	220	0.0	New
Workers Revolutionary	0	New			—	52	0.0	New
International Marxist	0	New			—	90	0.0	New
Blank and invalid votes						3,217	—	—
Total	71			0	100.0	2,887,075 (Note: All valid votes excluding spoiled votes.)	100.0	0.0
Registered voters, and turnout						1,993,516	79.0	▲4.9

Popular vote
Labour	36.63%
Conservative	32.93%
SNP	21.93%
Liberal	7.94%
Other	0.57%

Parliamentary seats
Labour	56.34%
Conservative	29.58%
SNP	9.86%
Liberal	4.23%

== See also ==
- February 1974 United Kingdom general election in England
- February 1974 United Kingdom general election in Wales
- February 1974 United Kingdom general election in Northern Ireland
- List of MPs for constituencies in Scotland (February 1974–October 1974)
