= February 1974 United Kingdom general election in Wales =

- 28 February 1974

All 36 Welsh seats to the House of Commons
- Turnout: 80.0% (▲2.6 pp)
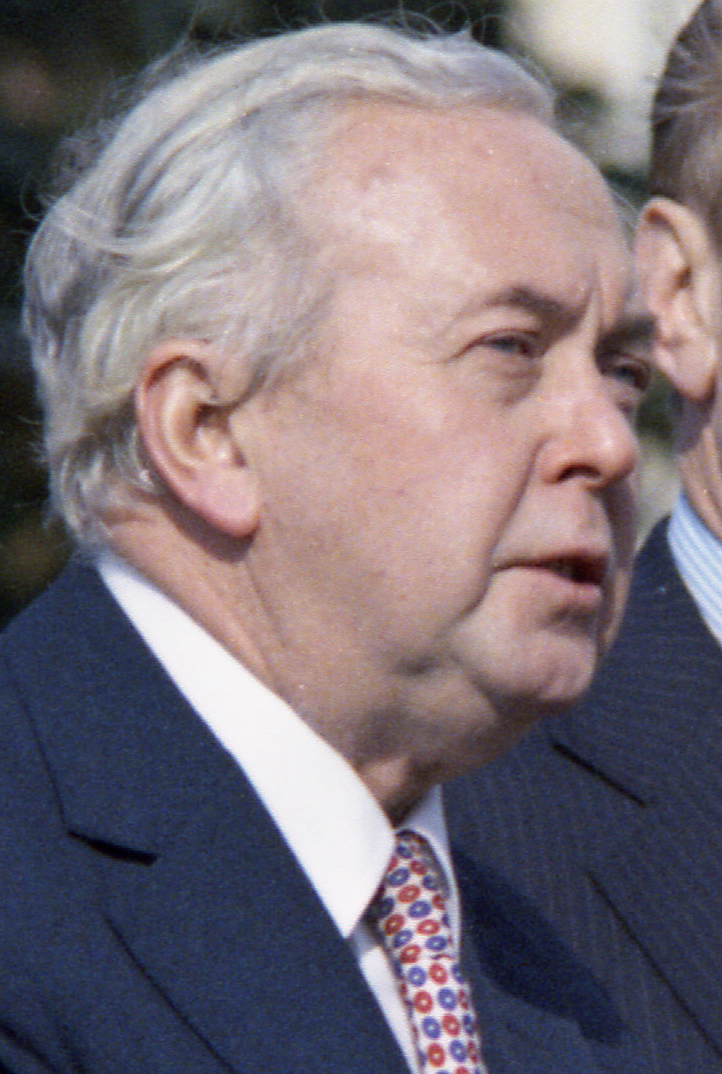

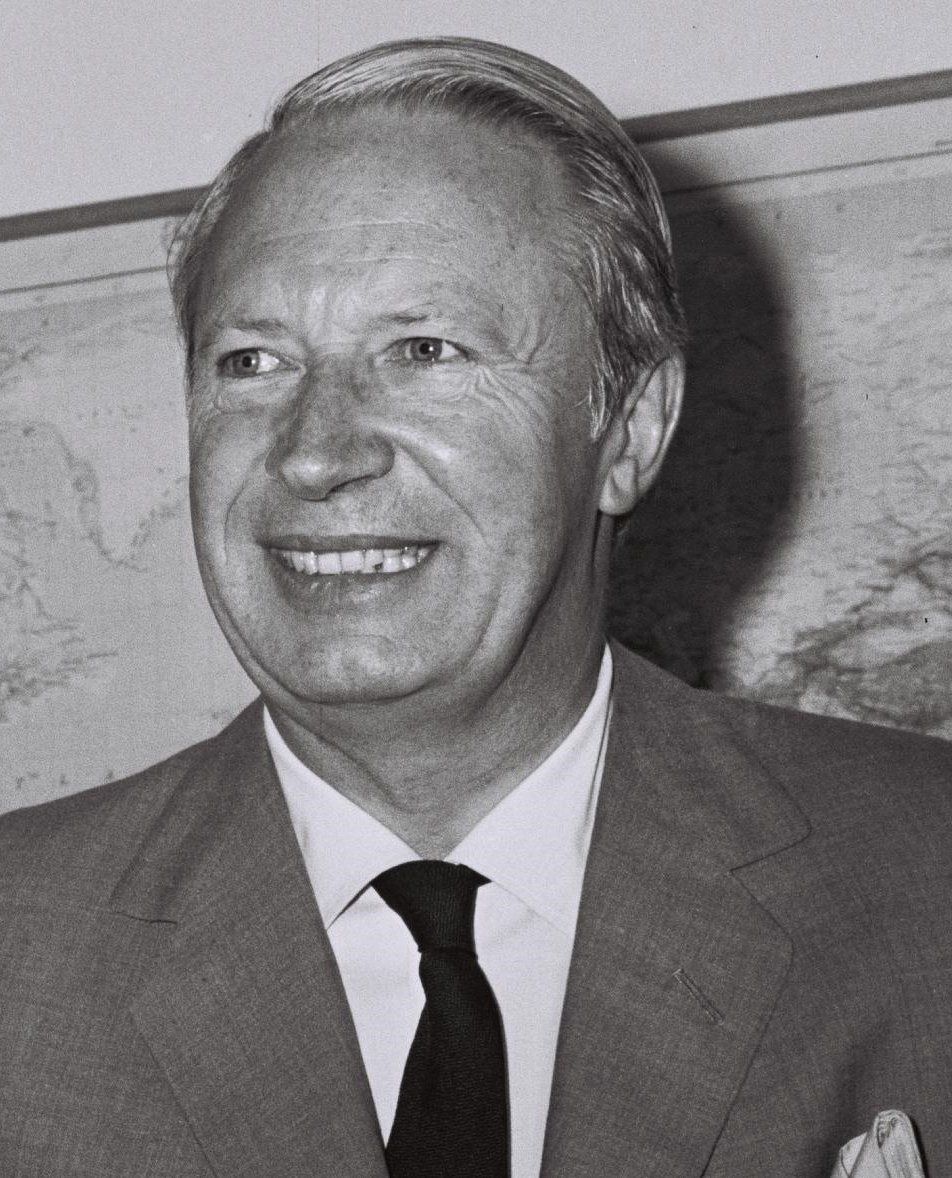

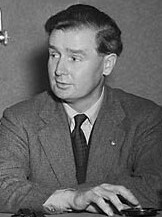
	First party	Second party
Leader	Harold Wilson	Edward Heath
Party	Labour	Conservative
Leader since	14 February 1963	28 July 1965
Leader's seat	Huyton	Sidcup
Last election	27 seats, 51.6%	7 seats, 27.7%
Seats before	26^{†}	8^{†}
Seats won	24	8
Seat change	▼2*	*
Popular vote	745,547	412,535
Percentage	46.8%	25.9%
Swing	▼4.8 pp	▼1.8 pp
	Third party	Fourth party
	Lib
Leader	Jeremy Thorpe	Gwynfor Evans
Party	Liberal	Plaid Cymru
Leader since	18 January 1967	1 August 1945
Leader's seat	North Devon	Ran in Carmarthen (defeated)
Last election	1 seat, 6.8%	0 seats, 11.5%
Seats before	1*	2^{†}
Seats won	2	2
Seat change	▲1^{†}	▲2*
Popular vote	255,423	171,374
Percentage	16.0%	10.8%
Swing	▲9.2 pp	▼0.7 pp
- ^{†}Notional 1970 results if held on the 1974 boundaries *Indicates boundary change—so this is a notional figure.

On Thursday 28 February 1974, the February 1974 United Kingdom general election was held in Wales, to elect all 635 members of the House of Commons, with 36 constituencies being in Wales.

When combined with results from across the UK, the election resulted in a hung parliament, the first since 1929. Labour, led by Leader of the Opposition and former Prime Minister Harold Wilson, ended up as the largest party, but seventeen short of an overall majority. The Conservatives, led by incumbent Prime Minister Edward Heath, lost 28 seats (though they polled a higher share of the vote than Labour). Heath sought a coalition with the Liberals, but the two parties failed to come to an agreement and so Wilson became prime minister for a second time, his first with a minority government. Wilson called another early election in September, which was held in October and resulted in a slim Labour majority.

== Boundary Review ==
As part of the second periodic review of Westminster constituencies, the boundaries were changed in Wales, with the number of constituencies being unchanged in number to those used between 1955 and 1970. There were also boundary changes to many of the 38 constituency boundaries in Wales, and more widely across the United Kingdom.

As a result, the Conservative Party notionally held 8 seats in England compared with Labour's 26 on a notional basis (one change between the two major parties). The Liberal Party was, in essence, unaffected in terms of seats.

== Candidates ==
Below is a table summarising the candidates of the February 1974 general election in Wales.

Affiliation	Candidates
Labour Party	36
Conservative and Unionist Party	36
Plaid Cymru	36
Liberal Party	31
Communist Party of Great Britain	6
Independent Liberal	1 (Note: Candidate Christopher Bailey stood in Cardiff South East.)
Workers Revolutionary Party	1 (Note: Candidate R. Battersby stood in Merthyr Tydfil.)
Independent	1 (Note: Candidate D.H. Bevan stood in Caerphilly.)
Total	148

== Analysis ==
The election saw the Labour Party win the most votes and seats in Wales. Labour gained Merthyr Tydfil from the seat being previously held by Independent Labour MP S. O. Davies. Davies passed away in 1972, leading to Labour retaking the seat in the 1972 Merthyr Tydfil by-election.

Labour, although gaining one seat via a retention from the by-election, lost four seats. These included Caernarvon and Merionethshire to Plaid Cymru. These were the first seats Plaid had won at a general election and outside a by-election, with Dafydd Wigley entering Parliament in Caernarvon, and Dafydd Elis-Thomas entering in Merionethshire.

Labour also lost the seat of Cardiganshire to the Liberal Party, with Geraint Howells entering Parliament in the seat. The Liberal Party also retained Montgomeryshire. The MP was Emlyn Hooson. Much like in the rest of the United Kingdom, the Liberal Party stood a far greater number of candidate than it had in previous decades, seeing a large universal swing in favour of the Liberal Party from the Conservatives and Labour.

Labour also lost a seat by way of the redistribution of the second periodic review, with Rhondda being created from Rhondda West and Rhondda East. Alec Jones, who had represented Rhondda West, won the new seat. Elfed Davies retired from the House of Commons following the abolition of Rhondda East, thereby constituting a loss.

The Conservative Party gained the newly created seat of Cardiff North West. It retained the seats of Pembrokeshire, Barry, Cardiff North, West Flintshire, Denbigh, Conway and Monmouth. Therefore, the Conservative Party managed to increase its seat from seven to eight, despite the slight drop in vote share.

== Results ==
Below is a table summarising the results of the February 1974 general election in Wales.

Party	Seats					Aggregate votes		
Party	Total	Gains	Losses	Net	Of total (%)	Total	Of total (%)	Change (%)
Labour	24	1	3	▼2	66.7	745,547	46.8	▼4.8
Conservative	8	0	0	Steady	22.2	412,535	25.9	▼1.8
Liberal	2	1	0	▲1	5.6	255,423	16.8	▲9.2
Plaid Cymru	2	2	0	▲2	5.6	171,372	10.8	▼0.7
Communist	0	0	0	Steady	—	4,293	0.3	▼0.1
Independent Liberal	0	Did not stand in 1970			—	3,800	0.2	—N/a
Independent	0	Did not stand in 1970			—	711	0.0	—N/a
Workers Revolutionary	0	New			—	160	0.0	New
Other non-contested	0	—N/a		▼1 (Note: Independent Labour MP S. O. Davies in Merthyr Tydfil.)	—	0	0.0	—N/a
Blank and invalid votes						2,171	—	—
Total	36			0	100.0	1,593,843 (Note: All valid votes excluding spoiled votes.)	100.0	0.0
Registered voters, and turnout						1,993,516	80.0	▲2.6

Popular vote
Labour	46.8%
Conservative	25.9%
Liberal	16.8%
Plaid Cymru	10.8%
Other	0.6%

Parliament seats
Labour	66.7%
Conservative	22.2%
Liberal	5.6%
Plaid Cymru	5.6%

== See also ==
- February 1974 United Kingdom general election in England
- February 1974 United Kingdom general election in Scotland
- February 1974 United Kingdom general election in Northern Ireland
- List of MPs for constituencies in Wales (February 1974–October 1974)
