= February 1974 United Kingdom general election =

- 28 February 1974

All 635 seats in the House of Commons 318 seats needed for a majority
- Opinion polls
- Registered: 39,753,965
- Turnout: 31,340,162; 78.8% (▲6.8 pp)
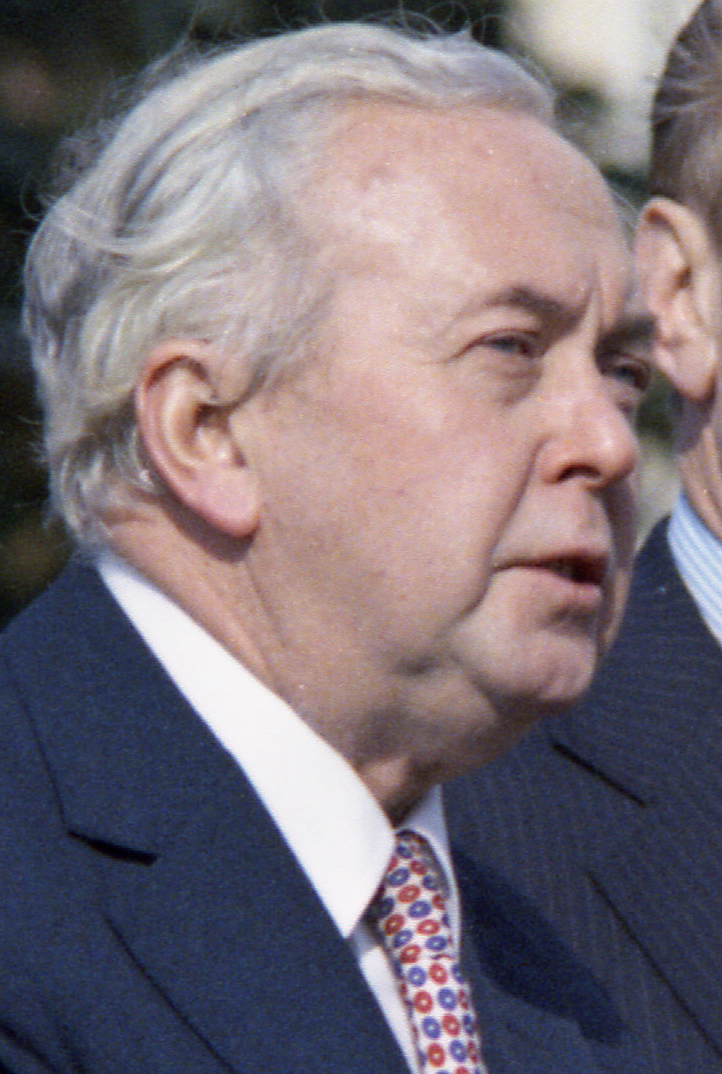

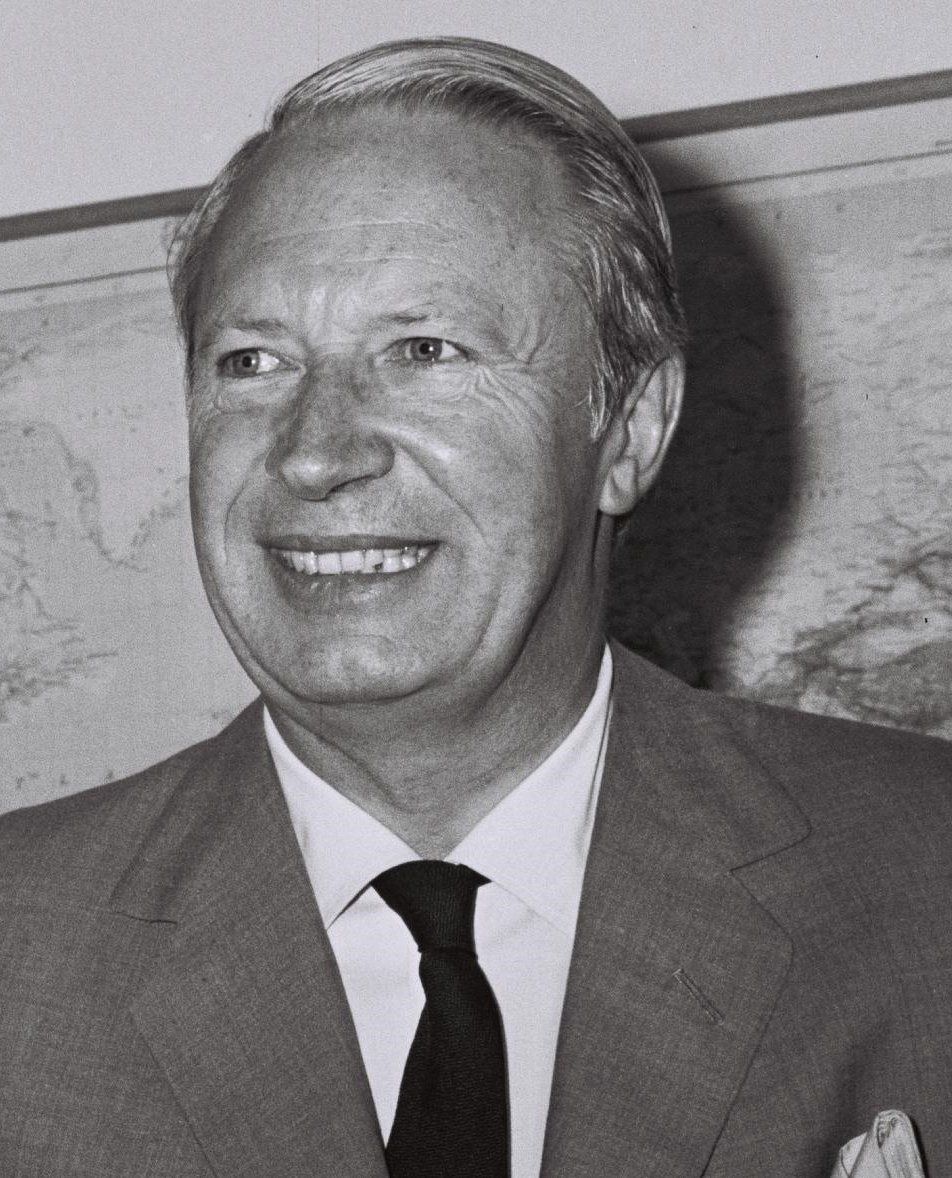
	First party	Second party
Leader	Harold Wilson	Edward Heath
Party	Labour	Conservative
Leader since	14 February 1963	28 July 1965
Leader's seat	Huyton	Sidcup (Note: Represented Bexley prior to dissolution. Sidcup was one of direct successor seats under new constituency boundaries.)
Last election	288 seats, 43.1%	330 seats, 46.4%
Seats before	281†	342†
Seats won	301	297 (Note: Figure includes Speaker of the House of Commons Selwyn Lloyd in Wirral.)
Seat change	▲20*	▼45*
Popular vote	11,645,616	11,872,180
Percentage	37.2%	37.9%
Swing	▼5.9 pp	▼8.5* pp
	Third party	Fourth party
	Lib	SNP
Leader	Jeremy Thorpe	William Wolfe
Party	Liberal	SNP
Leader since	18 January 1967	1 June 1969
Leader's seat	North Devon	Ran in West Lothian (lost)
Last election	6 seats, 7.5%	1 seat, 1.1%
Seats before	6†	1†
Seats won	14	7
Seat change	▲8*	▲6*
Popular vote	6,059,519	633,180
Percentage	19.3%	2.0%
Swing	▲11.8 pp	▲0.9 pp
- Colours denote the winning party—as shown in § Results * Indicates boundary change, so this is a nominal figure.^{†} Notional 1970 results on new boundaries.

- Composition of the House of Commons after the election
Prime Minister before election
Edward Heath
Conservative
Prime Minister after election
Harold Wilson
Labour

A general election was held in the United Kingdom on Thursday 28 February 1974. The Labour Party, led by former Prime Minister Harold Wilson, gained seats, and became the largest party, but was short of an overall majority. The governing Conservative Party, led by Prime Minister Edward Heath, lost seats, even though it polled a higher vote share than Labour. This resulted in the first hung parliament since 1929.

Heath sought a coalition with the Liberals, but the two parties failed to come to an agreement and so Wilson became prime minister for a second time, his first with a minority government. Wilson called another early election in September, which was held in October and resulted in a Labour majority. The February election was also the first general election to be held with the United Kingdom as a member state of the European Communities (EC), which was widely known as the "Common Market".

Its results saw Northern Ireland diverging heavily from the rest of the United Kingdom, with all twelve candidates elected being from local parties (eleven of them representing unionist parties) after the decision of the Ulster Unionist Party to withdraw support from the Conservative Party in protest over the Sunningdale Agreement. The Scottish National Party achieved significant success at the election by increasing its share of the popular vote in Scotland from 11% to 22%, and its number of MPs from one to seven. Plaid Cymru also succeeded for the first time in getting candidates elected at a general election in Wales (its sole previous seat was won at a by-election in 1966).

Although Heath's incumbent Conservative government polled the most votes by a small margin, the Conservatives were overtaken in terms of seats by Wilson's Labour Party because of a more efficiently distributed Labour vote. Ultimately, the decision by the seven Ulster Unionist MPs not to take the Conservative whip proved decisive in giving Labour a slim plurality of seats. The other four unionists elected were hardliners who were not affiliated with the UUP.

Both the Labour and the Conservative parties lost a considerable share of the popular vote, largely to the Liberal Party under Jeremy Thorpe's leadership, which polled two-and-a-half times its share of the vote in the previous election. However, even with over 6,000,000 votes, only 14 Liberal MPs were elected. There had been some media projections that the Liberals could take twice as many seats.

Given that it was not obvious who could command the support of the House, Heath did not resign immediately as prime minister. However, he knew that even if he could persuade all eleven of Northern Ireland's unionist MPs to support a Conservative government, at least on confidence matters, over one led by Wilson, he would still need the support of the Liberals to have a workable majority. Heath, therefore, started negotiations with Thorpe to form a coalition government. Thorpe, never enthusiastic about supporting the Conservatives, demanded major electoral reforms in exchange for such an agreement. Unwilling to accept such terms, Heath resigned, and Wilson returned for his second stint as Prime Minister.

The election night was covered live on the BBC and was presented by Alastair Burnet, David Butler, Robert McKenzie and Robin Day. ITV also covered the election, with the results being presented by Robert Kee, Peter Snow, Peter Jay, Richard Rose and Andrew Gardner.

Prominent members of Parliament who retired or were defeated at the election included Gordon Campbell, Bernadette McAliskey, Enoch Powell, Richard Crossman, Tom Driberg and Patrick Gordon Walker. It was the first of two United Kingdom general elections held that year, the first to take place after the United Kingdom became a member of the European Communities on 1 January 1973, and the first since 1929 not to produce an overall majority in the House of Commons for a single party. This was also the first time since 1910 that two general elections were held in the same year.

== Background ==
On 20 October 1973, a group of Arab nations led by King Faisal of Saudi Arabia imposed a total oil embargo on the United States to punish the Americans for a perceived pro-Israel bias during the October war, which led to the so-called "oil shock" that plunged the world into the steepest recession since the Great Depression. The United Kingdom was not subject to the embargo, but the embargo led to the price of oil quadrupling worldwide in late 1973 as the shortage of oil in the United States made American consumers willing to pay higher oil prices, which in turn led to higher worldwide oil prices including in Britain as oil producers would not ship oil to nations that would not pay the same prices relative to American consumers. Oil was discovered in the North Sea in 1969, but only started to be pumped in 1975, making Britain in 1973–1974 almost entirely dependent upon imported oil. At the time, it was believed that oil from the North Sea would be extracted only by the end of the 1970s. The end of the "long summer" of post-war prosperity caused an immense psychological shock in the Western nations, leading the Financial Times to run a famous headline in December 1973 reading: "The Future Will Be Subject to Delay".

In December 1973 Heath warned in a series of speeches that because of the "oil shock" that the United Kingdom was headed into a recession and the British people should expect economic austerity. The need to avoid importing the now considerably more expensive oil to help manage the balance-of-payments led the Heath government to turn towards coal (which Britain was self-sufficient in) as a substitute source of energy, which gave the coal miners union immense leverage over the government to press for higher wages for the coal miners. Prior to the oil shock, the government could always threaten to convert electricity plants powered by coal to oil, a threat that could no longer be credibly made. In the years prior to the "oil shock", there had been a tendency to switch from coal to oil to power electricity plants, a policy that reduced the need for coal and hence coal miners. Heath offered the coal miners a 7% wage increase, which was rejected as insufficient by the miners who wanted a 35% wage increase. In late 1973-early 1974, Heath held a series of inconclusive meetings with Joe Gormley, the president of the National Union of Mineworkers. Several times, Heath threatened to call a snap election with the aim of seeking a mandate to oppose the demands of Gormley and the other union leaders, a tactic that was considered to be counterproductive by the union leaders. In a bid to save electricity, in December 1973 the Heath government passed a bill to impose what was known as the "Three-Day Week" that came into effect on 1 January 1974, which greatly contributed to the crisis atmosphere. Heath decided in early 1974 to call a snap election to provide him with the mandate to oppose the NUM. In the early 1970s, the Liberals under Jeremy Thorpe had won 5 by-elections and public opinion polls showed that the Liberals would win at least 20% of the popular vote in a general election. Heath calculated that under the first-the-post system that the Liberals would not be able to translate their support into winning many seats, but that the Liberals would draw away many Labour voters disenchanted with Harold Wilson.

== Electoral system ==
=== Boundary review ===
As part of the second periodic review of Westminster constituencies under the House of Commons (Redistribution of Seats) Act 1949, the boundaries were changed in all four nations of the United Kingdom, with the number of constituencies being increased from the 630 used between 1955 and 1970, to 635 seats. England saw an increased from 511 seats to 516 with significant boundary changes. Within Wales, Scotland and Northern Ireland, each saw no change in the number of seats but received several boundary alterations.

=== Notional 1970 results ===
The new boundaries, which were significantly different from the previous boundaries used in 1970, brought about several gains and losses notionally in comparison to the previous election. This led to many seats changing hands on the new notional boundaries. The first studied attempts to find the notional results for a United Kingdom general election were brought about for the purposes of an election prediction for 1974, given the difficulties to do so under the extensive boundary changes.

Notional election results from the 1970 general election were calculated on behalf of the BBC by Michael Steed to compare constituency results with those of February 1974. Similar efforts were taken by ITN and the Press Association.

However, given the difficult nature of the exercise and relatively untested new methods used, newly created seats and significant boundary changed presented a challenge to bring about a level of precision for an early presentation of this method. The suggested result would have been at the very least five to fifteen difference between the Conservative Party and Labour, although a more precise change was given for the election. Nevertheless, Steed, along with similar estimates that were made, suggested that this would have been around an increase of 12 Conservative MPs over the Labour Party losing roughly seven and all other parties being unaffected overall.

The most substantial changes came from England, with the seats counts in Scotland, Wales and Northern Ireland being relatively unaffected, though with two thirds of the boundaries changed to a large extent. This left a minor mark, despite the rejection of the changes by the Labour Party in the House of Commons on the belief that the boundary changes would have a much greater effect. Rather, the changes in boundaries, despite the significance in changes, led to rather minor alterations in seat counts between to the two major parties.

The Ulster Unionist Party remained under the Conservative Party count due to being under the Conservative Party's Whip since the very creation of the party until 1972.

Notional 1970 results on 1974 boundaries
Party	1970 MPs		
Party	Actual	Notional	Difference
Conservative	330	342	▲12
Labour	288	281	▼7
Liberal	6	6	Steady
SNP	1	1	Steady
DUP	1	1	Steady
Independent Labour	1	1	Steady
Republican Labour	1	1	Steady

== Campaign ==
On Thursday 7 February, Prime Minister Edward Heath revealed that he had asked Queen Elizabeth II, then in New Zealand for the 1974 British Commonwealth Games, to dissolve Parliament for a general election to take place on 28 February. Because of the Queen's being abroad, the dissolution of parliament was required to be promulgated by Counsellors of State, in this case Queen Elizabeth The Queen Mother and Princess Margaret, on her express instructions. The severe economic circumstances in which the election was held prompted both The Sun and the Daily Mirror to characterise it as a "crisis election". Heath had been elected on a platform in 1970 that in some ways anticipated the policies later pursued by Margaret Thatcher as he called for less state involvement in the economy, but during his time in office he performed a series of "u-turns" that instead led to greater state involvement in the British economy, which had damaged his reputation. Heath by his various "u-turns" performed between 1970 and 1974 acquired the image of a leader who reacted to events instead of being a leader who shaped events, which contributed in part to his defeat in 1974. A number of ministers in Heath's government, most notably William Whitelaw, were opposed to calling an election in early 1974 and would preferred to wait until later in 1974 or even 1975 out of the hope the economy might be in better shape. With the notable exception of the question of British membership in the European Economic Community, foreign policy was not a factor in the election with the attention being paid mainly to domestic issues.

On 10 February, the National Union of Mineworkers, as expected, went on strike, but it was more of a low-key affair than the high-profile clashes of 1972, with no violence and only six men on each picket line. Jim Prior later wrote that the miners had been "as quiet and well-behaved as mice". The Three-Day Week continued throughout the election, although Heath allowed the late-night television curfew to be lifted to allow more coverage of the campaign. The low profile of the miners' strike allowed worries over inflation to dominate the election. On 15 February, the Retail Price Index showed a 20% increase in prices over the previous year.

On 21 February, the Pay Board released a report on miners' pay, which unexpectedly revealed that they were paid less than other manufacturing workers, contrary to the claims of the National Coal Board. That came as a severe blow to the Conservative position, and led to accusations that the National Coal Board did not understand its own pay system and that the strike was unnecessary. Further bad news for Heath and his party came four days later, with the latest trade figures showing that the current account deficit for the previous month had been £383,000,000, the worst in recorded history. Heath claimed the figures confirmed "the gravity of the situation" and the need for a new mandate, which prompted Roy Jenkins to quip: "He [Heath] presumably thinks a still worse result would have given him a still stronger claim".

One of the most unexpected and explosive events of the campaign was when the outspoken Conservative MP Enoch Powell, who had already rejected the Conservative manifesto, urged people to vote against Heath for bringing about UK membership of the European Communities. In a speech in Birmingham on 23 February 1974, Powell claimed the main issue in the campaign was whether Britain was to "remain a democratic nation ... or whether it will become one province in a new Europe super-state"; he said it was people's "national duty" to oppose those who had deprived Parliament of "its sole right to make the laws and impose the taxes of the country". The speech prompted The Sun to run the headline "Enoch puts the boot in". A few days later, he said he hoped for victory by "the party which is committed to a fundamental renegotiation of the Treaty of Brussels and to submitting to the British People ... the outcome of that renegotiation". Those were the explicit manifesto promises of the Labour Party.

A further unforeseen blow to the Conservative campaign came on 26 February when Campbell Adamson, Director-General of the Confederation of British Industry (CBI), called for the repeal of the Heath Government's Industrial Relations Act, saying that the Act had "sullied every relationship between employers and unions at national level". Adamson had been closely involved with the Downing Street talks over the mining dispute. Although Heath emphasised that Adamson was voicing a personal opinion and that his views did not express the official position of the CBI, he after the election acknowledged that the intervention had a negative impact on the Conservative campaign. Labour, meanwhile, cited Adamson's comments as proving the need "for everything they (had)... been urging on the Government".

=== Conservative campaign ===
Heath addressed the country on television on the evening of 7 February, and asked:

Do you want a strong Government which has clear authority for the future to take decisions which will be needed? Do you want Parliament and the elected Government to continue to fight strenuously against inflation? Or do you want them to abandon the struggle against rising prices under pressure from one particularly powerful group of workers ... This time of strife has got to stop. Only you can stop it. It's time for you to speak — with your vote. It's time for your voice to be heard — the voice of the moderate and reasonable people of Britain: the voice of the majority. It's time for you to say to the extremists, the militants, and the plain and simply misguided: we've had enough. There's a lot to be done. For heaven's sake, let's get on with it.

The Conservative campaign was, thus, encapsulated by the now-famous phrase "Who governs Britain?"

The party's manifesto, which was largely written by the future Chancellor Nigel Lawson, was entitled Firm Action for a Fair Britain and characterised by the historian Dominic Sandbrook as "strident rhetoric". It claimed the Labour opposition had been taken over by "a small group of power-hungry trade union leaders", who were "committed to a left-wing programme more dangerous and more extreme than ever before in its history". It went on to assert that a Labour victory would be a "major national disaster". Sandbrook criticised the Conservative manifesto as "very vague and woolly" and lacking in "detailed policies or [a] sense of direction."

Edward Heath played a dominant and crucial role in the campaign. In public, he appeared calm and in control. David Watt, in the Financial Times, called him "statesmanlike" and "relaxed". In his party's final broadcast of the campaign he said: "I'll do all that I can for this country ... We've started a job together. With your will, we shall go on and finish the job".

One Conservative political broadcast attracted controversy for its ferocity. The film warned that Labour would confiscate "your bank account, your mortgage and your wage packet" while pictures of Harold Wilson and James Callaghan dissolved into those of Michael Foot and Tony Benn. It went on to allege that Labour would not have to move much further to the left before "you could find yourself not even owning your own home". Wilson was reportedly furious, and Lord Carrington, the Secretary of State for Energy, made a formal apology.

=== Labour campaign ===
The Labour manifesto, Let us work together, consisted of ten pages only, the shortest since 1955. It had been greatly influenced by the economist Stuart Holland and Shadow Industry Secretary Tony Benn. In it, Labour promised "a fundamental and irreversible shift in the balance of power and wealth in favour of working people and their families". It advocated planning agreements with industry and the creation of a National Enterprise Board. That section attracted criticism from some figures within the party. For example, Anthony Crosland privately called the programme "half-baked" and "idiotic". The manifesto also committed the party to renegotiating the terms of Britain's entry into the European Economic Community and to holding a national referendum on the issue.

The Labour campaign presented the party's leadership as competent negotiators, who would restore peace with the unions. Unlike in previous elections, Wilson took something of a back seat and allowed James Callaghan, Denis Healey and Shirley Williams to play equal, if not greater, roles in the campaign. In the final broadcast of the campaign, a series of leading figures claimed Labour could put Britain "on the road to recovery". In the film, Wilson asserted: "Trades unionists are people. Employers are people. We can't go on setting one against the other except at the cost of damage to the nation itself".

=== Liberal campaign ===
The Liberal Party had undergone a revival under the leadership of Jeremy Thorpe by winning a string of by-elections in 1972 and 1973. It had begun to appeal to disaffected Conservative voters and continued to do so throughout the campaign. In a number of constituencies in England whose population was predominantly middle class that were held by Conservative MPs, the Liberals attracted significant support. Thorpe came across as young and charismatic, often attempting to appear above the two-party fray. The manifesto, You can Change the Face of Britain, promised voting reform and devolution, but Sandbrook described its economic policy as "impossibly vague". The Liberals began to contest more seats, standing in 517 constituencies across the country. In the 1974 election, the Liberals seemed to have drawn away more voters from the Conservatives than Labour.

=== Scottish National Party campaign ===
During the election, the Scottish National Party campaigned widely on the political slogan "It's Scotland's oil". It was argued that the discovery of North Sea oil off the coast of Scotland and the revenue that it created would not benefit Scotland to any significant degree while it remained part of the United Kingdom.

=== Position of press ===
The historian Dominic Sandbrook describes the "level of partisanship" amongst the national newspapers during the election as "unprecedented" in post-war Britain, with most of the media prejudiced in favour of Heath and the Conservatives. The Daily Mirror was one of the few national newspapers to support Labour, with many others urging their readers to re-elect Heath. In the right-wing media, there was fierce condemnation of Wilson and his party. The Sun, which had supported Labour in 1970, claimed a Labour victory would result in "galloping inflation", and an editorial in The Daily Telegraph said a Labour government would be "complete ruin public and private" and condemned what it saw as Wilson's "craven subservience to trade union power". The Evening Standard published a piece by Kingsley Amis calling the Labour politician Tony Benn, who was to be appointed Secretary of State for Industry after the election, "the most dangerous man in Britain", and in the Daily Express, the cartoonist Cummings depicted the miners' leader Joe Gormley, Wilson and other Labour figures as French revolutionaries guillotining Heath. The Guardian, in contrast, chose to support no party openly. Its columnist Peter Jenkins claimed the last ten years had proved that "neither party" had the ability to deal with the country's problems.

== Economic background ==
It was the first general election in the United Kingdom to be held during an economic crisis since the 1931 general election, which had been held in the depths of the Great Depression.

== Opinion polls ==
Throughout the campaign 25 of the 26 opinion polls had a Conservative lead and one even by 9%. Of the six polls on election day (28 February), two had a 2% lead, two a 4% lead, one a 3% lead and one a 5% lead.

== Timeline ==
As the Queen was in New Zealand on 7 February, the Prime Minister notified her of his intentions via telegram, rather than by the usual protocol of visiting Buckingham Palace. The key dates were as follows:

Friday 8 February	Dissolution of the 45th Parliament and official beginning of campaign
Monday 18 February	Last day to file nomination papers; 2,135 candidates enter to contest 635 seats
Wednesday 27 February	Campaigning officially ends
Thursday 28 February	Polling day
Friday 1 March	Election results in a hung parliament with Labour narrowly ahead as the largest party but short of a majority
Sunday 3 March	Edward Heath begins meetings with Liberal Party leader Jeremy Thorpe to discuss the terms of a potential coalition
Monday 4 March	Conservative Prime Minister Edward Heath resigns shortly after the Liberals reject his coalition terms, which allows Harold Wilson to return to power as leader of a Labour minority government
Wednesday 6 March	46th Parliament assembles
Tuesday 12 March	State Opening of Parliament

== Analysis ==
For the first time since 1929, the two largest political parties had received less than a combined share of 80% of the vote, and the Liberals had also won more than 10% of the vote. The Liberals under Thorpe made their strongest showing since the 1929 election, which reflected a disenchantment with both Labour and the Conservatives by sections of the public. The Liberals won six million votes, but because of the first-past-the-post system won only 14 seats. After the election, there were talks for a Conservative-Liberal coalition, which fell apart, leading for the Queen to ask Wilson to form a minority Labour government. The main stumbling block in the Heath-Thorpe talks were the latter's demand for the end of the first-past-the-post electoral system, which did not favor the Liberals. Even if the Liberals and the Conservatives had formed a coalition, the government would have been 14 seats short of a majority. Heath had wanted to stay on as prime minister and intended to govern as if he had a majority by threatening another general election in the event of a no-confidence vote. Heath's plans led to serious questions about the constitutional probity about this course if Heath should stay on and ask the Queen for another election if his government should be defeated in the Commons. The historian Sir John Wheeler-Bennett when asked for his opinion advised the courtier Martin Charteris by quoting Arthur Balfour "no constitution can subside on a diet of dissolutions", which was understood to mean that an attempt should be made to form a government before dissolving the House of Commons for another election just fresh after an election. Wheeler-Bennett was a Conservative, but he argued Heath had been given the election he had asked for and to allow him to continue as the prime minister even if he formed a coalition with the Liberals would lead to serious problems of democratic legitimacy.

The Conservatives or any other England-based political party has never won a single seat from Northern Ireland since the defeat of all sitting Northern Irish Conservative MPs in this election, due to the popular outrage against the 1972 prorogation of the Parliament of Northern Ireland & the Suningdale Agreement. Since then, all Northern Irish MPs have belonged to local political outfits.

== Results ==
=== Summary of seats returned ===
Party	Leader	MPs		Aggregate votes	
Party	Leader		Of total		Of total
Labour Party	Harold Wilson	301 (Note: Includes 14 Co-operative Party MP, as part of the Labour-Co-op alliance.)	47.4%	11,645,616	37.2%
Conservative and Unionist Party	Edward Heath	297	46.8%	11,872,180	37.9%
Liberal Party	Jeremy Thorpe	14	2.2%	6,059,519	19.3%
Scottish National Party	William Wolfe	7	1.1%	633,180	2.0%
Ulster Unionist Party	Harry West	7	1.1%	232,103	0.7%
Vanguard Unionist Progressive Party	William Craig	3	0.5%	75,944	0.2%
Plaid Cymru	Gwynfor Evans	2	0.3%	171,374	0.5%
Social Democratic and Labour Party	Gerry Fitt	1	0.2%	160,437	0.5%
Democratic Unionist Party	Ian Paisley	1	0.2%	58,656	0.2%
Independent Labour	—N/a	1	0.2%	22,918	0.1%
Democratic Labour Party	Dick Taverne	1	0.2%	14,780	0.1%

=== Full results ===

Results of the February 1974 general election to the House of Commons of the United Kingdom
Party	Leader	Candidates	MPs					Aggregate votes		
Party	Leader	Candidates	Total	Gains	Losses	Net	Of total (%)	Total	Of total (%)	Change (%)
Conservative	Edward; Heath	623	297	5	50	▼45	46.8	11,872,180	37.9	▼8.5
Labour	Harold; Wilson	623 (Note: Includes 25 Co-operative Party candidates, as part of the Labour-Co-op alliance.)	301 (Note: Includes 14 Co-operative Party MPs, as part of the Labour-Co-op alliance.)	34	14	▲20 (Note: Includes ▼1 Co-operative Party MPs, as part of the Labour-Co-op alliance.)	47.4 (Note: Includes 2.2% for the Co-operative Party, as part of the Labour-Co-op alliance.)	11,645,616 (Note: Includes 518,981 for the Co-operative Party, as part of the Labour-Co-op alliance.)	37.2 (Note: Includes 1.7% for the Co-operative Party, as part of the Labour-Co-op alliance.)	▼5.9 (Note: Includes ▼0.2% for the Co-operative Party, as part of the Labour-Co-op alliance.)
Liberal	Jeremy; Thorpe	517	14	8	0	▲8	2.2	6,059,519	19.3	▲11.8
SNP	William; Wolfe	70	7	6	0	▲6	1.1	633,180	2.0	▲0.9
UUP	Harry; West	7	7	Split from Conservative Whip		▲7 (Note: Increase compared with affiliation with Conservative Party in previous elections. Gained 1 seat (Fermanagh and South Tyrone) and 'gained' 6 by UPP retentions but leaving the Conservative Whip. The UPP also 'lost' 2 seats to the Vanguard Unionist Progressive Party; however these 2 losses are counted for the Conservative Party in comparison to 1970 due to the UUP's initial national affiliation in that election.)	1.1	232,103	0.7	—N/a
Plaid Cymru	Gwynfor; Evans	36	2	2	0	▲2	0.3	171,374	0.5	▼0.1
SDLP	Gerry; Fitt	12	1 (Note: Gerry Fitt in Belfast West.)	New		▲1	0.2	160,437	0.5	New
Pro-Assembly Unionist	Brian; Faulkner	7	0	New			—	94,301	0.3	New
National; Front	John; O'Brien	54	0	0	0	Steady	—	76,865	0.2	▲0.2
Vanguard; Unionist	William; Craig	3	3	New		▲3	0.5	75,944	0.2	New
DUP	Ian; Paisley	2	1 (Note: Ian Paisley in North Antrim.)	0	0	Steady	0.2	58,656	0.2	▲0.1
Communist	John; Gollan	44	0	0	0	Steady	—	32,743	0.1	Steady
Independent	—N/a	31	0	0	0	Steady	—	27,071	0.1	Steady
Independent; Liberal	—N/a	5	0	0	0	Steady	—	24,972	0.1	▲0.1
Independent; Labour	—N/a	1	1	1 (Note: Eddie Milne in Blyth Valley.)	1 (Note: S. O. Davies in Merthyr Tydfil.)	Steady	0.2	22,918	0.1	Steady
Alliance	Oliver; Napier	2	0	New			—	22,660	0.1	New
Unity	—N/a	2	0	0	2	▼2	—	17,593	0.1	▼0.4
Independent; Socialist	—N/a	2	0	New			—	17,300	0.1	New
NI; Labour	Alan; Carr	5	0	Split from Labour			—	17,284	0.1	—N/a
Republican; Clubs	Tomás; Mac Giolla	4	0	New			—	15,152	0.1	New
Democratic; Labour	Dick; Taverne	1	1 (Note: Leader Dick Taverne in Lincoln.)	New		▲1	0.2	14,780	0.1	New
Independent; Conservative	—N/a	18	0	0	0	Steady	—	10,338	0.0	Steady
Independent; Republican	—N/a	1 (Note: Candidate Albert Price stood in Belfast West.)	0	Did not stand in 1970			—	5,662	0.0	—N/a
PEOPLE	Tony; Whittaker	6	0	New			—	4,576	0.0	New
Workers; Revolutionary	Gerry; Healy	9	0	New			—	4,191	0.0	New
Campaign for Social Democracy	Dick; Taverne	4	0	New			—	2,646	0.0	New
Independent; Democratic	John; Creasey	6	0	New			—	1,976	0.0	New
National; Independence	John; Davis	2	0	New			—	1,602	0.0	New
Anti- EEC	—N/a	2	0	New			—	1,447	0.0	New
Marxist-Leninist (England)	John; Buckle	6	0	New			—	1,419	0.0	New
Anti- Immigration	—N/a	1 (Note: Candidate Jim Merrick stood in Bradford West.)	0	0	0	Steady	—	1,164	0.0	New
National Democratic	David; Brown	1 (Note: Candidate David R. M. Brown stood in Ipswich.)	0	0	0	Steady	—	1,161	0.0	▼0.1
United; Labour	—N/a	1 (Note: Candidate Malcolm Macmillan stood in Western Isles.)	0	New			—	1,031	0.0	New
Ind. Labour Party	Emrys; Thomas	1 (Note: Candidate M. Pikestood in St Helens.)	0	0	0	Steady	—	991	0.0	Steady
Democratic; Christian	—N/a	1 (Note: Candidate J. E. Stringfellow stood in Harrogate.)	0	New			—	875	0.0	New
Mebyon; Kernow	Richard; Jenkin	1 (Note: Candidate James Whetter stood in Truro.)	0	0	0	Steady	—	850	0.0	Steady
Democratic; Conservative	—N/a	1 (Note: Candidate J.E. Tippett stood in Yeovil.)	0	New			—	720	0.0	New
International; Marxist Group	—N/a	3	0	New			—	716	0.0	New
British; Movement	Colin; Jordan	1 (Note: Leader Colin Jordan stood in Wolverhampton North East.)	0	New			—	711	0.0	New
Independent; Social Democrat	—N/a	1 (Note: Candidate W. Stone stood in Dover and Deal.)	0	New			—	661	0.0	New
Labour and Democrat	—N/a	1 (Note: Candidate D. Fallon stood in Islington North.)	0	New			—	570	0.0	New
Wessex; Regionalists	Alexander Thynn	1 (Note: Candidate Alexander Thynn stood in Westbury.)	0	New			—	521	0.0	New
English; National	—N/a	1 (Note: Candidate David Maxwell stood in South West Staffordshire.)	0	New			—	482	0.0	New
National; Coalition	—N/a	1 (Note: Candidate DB Foster stood in North West Surrey.)	0	New			—	463	0.0	New
Independent; Progressive	—N/a	1 (Note: Candidate C. C. Fairhead stood in South Norfolk.)	0	0	0	Steady	—	337	0.0	Steady
Anti- Helmet	—N/a	1 (Note: Candidate Baldev Singh Chahal stood in Southall.)	0	New			—	310	0.0	New
Anti-Common Market Conservative	—N/a	1 (Note: Candidate M.J. Christie stood in Kingston-upon-Thames.)	0	New			—	288	0.0	New
Independent; Democrat	—N/a	1 (Note: Candidate Mervyn Taggart stood in Reigate.)	0	New			—	254	0.0	New
More Prosperous Britain	Tom; Keen	1 (Note: Candidate and co-founder Harold Smith stood in Huyton.)	0	New			—	234	0.0	New
United Kingdom; Front	—N/a	1 (Note: Candidate S Rowe stood in Newcastle-under-Lyme.)	0	New			—	228	0.0	New
Christian; Democratic Socialist	—N/a	1 (Note: Candidate James Gourlay stood in Dundee East.)	0	New			—	220	0.0	New
New; Freedom	Frank Hansford-Miller	1 (Note: Candidate Frank Hansford-Miller stood in Lewisham East.)	0	New			—	203	0.0	New
British; Exports	—N/a	1 (Note: Candidate John Richard Michael Murphy stood in Woolwich East.)	0	New			—	191	0.0	New
Community	—N/a	1 (Note: Candidate E. Dignan stood in Faversham.)	0	New			—	151	0.0	New
World; Government	Gilbert; Young	1 (Note: Leader Gilbert Young stood in Bath.)	0	0	0	Steady	—	118	0.0	Steady
Social; Credit	—N/a	1 (Note: Candidate Archie S. Frost stood in Rugby.)	0	0	0	Steady	—	106	0.0	Steady
Technical; Consultant	—N/a	1 (Note: Candidate PHH Bishop stood in Petersfield.)	0	New			—	101	0.0	New
Other non-contested		0	0	—N/a		▼1 (Note: 1 Republican Labour Party seat, although MP Gerry Fitt retained his seat as a Social Democratic and Labour Party MP.)	—	0	0.0	—N/a
Blank and invalid votes								42,252	—	—
Total		2,135	635			0	100.0	31,340,162 (Note: All valid votes excluding spoiled votes.)	100.0	0.0
Registered voters, and turnout								39,753,965	78.8	▲6.8

=== Votes summary ===
Popular vote
Conservative	37.90%
Labour	37.18%
Liberal	19.35%
SNP	2.02%
Others	3.55%

=== Seats summary ===
Parliamentary seats
Labour	47.40%
Conservative	46.77%
Liberal	2.20%
SNP	1.10%
Others	2.52%

== Incumbents defeated ==
Party	Name	Constituency	Office held whilst in Parliament	Defeated by	Party
Conservative	Patricia Hornsby-Smith	Chislehurst, contested Aldridge-Brownhills		Geoff Edge	Labour
Conservative	Patrick Wolrige-Gordon	Aberdeenshire East		Douglas Henderson	Scottish National Party
Conservative	Wilfred Baker	Banffshire		Hamish Watt	Scottish National Party
Conservative	Eric Cockeram	Bebington, contested Bebington and Ellesmere Port		Alf Bates	Labour
Conservative	Geoffrey Stewart-Smith	Belper		Roderick MacFarquhar	Labour
Conservative	Sydney Chapman	Birmingham Handsworth		John Lee	Labour
Conservative	Joseph Kinsey	Birmingham Perry Barr		Jeff Rooker	Labour
Conservative	Derek Coombs	Birmingham Yardley		Syd Tierney	Labour
Conservative	Robert Hicks	Bodmin		Paul Tyler	Liberal
Conservative	Laurance Reed	Bolton East		David Young	Labour
Conservative	John Wilkinson	Bradford West		Edward Lyons	Labour
Conservative	Fergus Montgomery	Brierley Hill, contested Dudley West		Colin Phipps	Labour
Conservative	Wilfred Proudfoot	Brighouse and Spenborough		Colin Jackson	Labour
Conservative	Constance Monks	Chorley		George Rodgers	Labour
Conservative	Peter Trew	Dartford		Sydney Irving	Labour
Conservative	Roger White	Gravesend		John Ovenden	Labour
Conservative	Albert Cooper	Ilford South		Arnold Shaw	Labour
Conservative	Mark Woodnutt	Isle of Wight		Stephen Ross	Liberal
Conservative	Joan Hall	Keighley		Bob Cryer	Labour
Conservative	John Gummer	Lewisham West		Christopher Price	Labour
Conservative	Charles Simeons	Luton, contested Luton East		Ivor Clemitson	Labour
Conservative	Frank Taylor	Manchester Moss Side		Frank Hatton	Labour
Conservative	Keith Speed	Meriden		John Tomlinson	Labour
Conservative	John Sutcliffe	Middlesbrough West, contested Thornaby		Ian Wrigglesworth	Labour
Conservative	Alan Haselhurst	Middleton and Prestwich		Jim Callaghan	Labour
Conservative	Gordon Campbell	Moray and Nairn	Secretary of State for Scotland	Winnie Ewing	Scottish National Party
Conservative	Thomas Stuttaford	Norwich South		John Garrett	Labour
Conservative	Harold Soref	Ormskirk		Robert Kilroy-Silk	Labour
Conservative	Nicholas Scott	Paddington South, contested Paddington		Arthur Latham	Labour
Conservative	Joan Vickers	Plymouth Devonport		David Owen	Labour
Conservative	Mary Holt	Preston North		Ronald Atkins	Labour
Conservative	Alan Green	Preston South		Stan Thorne	Labour
Conservative	Idris Owen	Stockport North		Andrew Bennett	Labour
Conservative	Anthony Trafford	The Wrekin		Gerald Fowler	Labour
Labour	Nigel Spearing	Acton		George Young	Conservative
Labour	Terry Davis	Bromsgrove, contested Bromsgrove and Redditch		Hal Miller	Conservative
Labour	Ivor Richard	Barons Court, contested Blyth		Eddie Milne	Independent Labour
Labour	John Mackintosh	Berwick and East Lothian		Michael Ancram	Conservative
Labour	Michael Barnes	Brentford and Chiswick, contested Brentford and Isleworth		Barney Hayhoe	Conservative
Labour	Goronwy Roberts	Caernarvon		Dafydd Wigley	Plaid Cymru
Labour	Elystan Morgan	Cardiganshire	Chairman of Welsh Labour	Geraint Howells	Liberal
Labour	Dick Douglas	Clackmannan and East Stirlingshire		George Reid	Scottish National Party
Labour	David Clark	Colne Valley		Richard Wainwright	Liberal
Labour	George Machin	Dundee East		Gordon Wilson	Scottish National Party
Labour	William Edwards	Merionethshire		Dafydd Elis-Thomas	Plaid Cymru
Liberal	David Austick	Ripon		Keith Hampson	Conservative
Liberal	Graham Tope	Sutton and Cheam		Neil Macfarlane	Conservative
Scottish National Party	Margo MacDonald	Glasgow Govan		Harry Selby	Labour
Pro-Assembly Unionist	Rafton Pounder	Belfast South	Former UUP MP	Robert Bradford	Vanguard Unionist Progressive
Ulster Unionist	Stanley McMaster	Belfast East		William Craig	Vanguard Unionist Progressive
Unity	Frank McManus	Fermanagh and South Tyrone		Harry West	Ulster Unionist
Independent Socialist	Bernadette McAliskey	Mid Ulster		John Dunlop	Vanguard Unionist Progressive

== See also ==
- List of MPs elected in the February 1974 United Kingdom general election
- February 1974 United Kingdom general election in England
- February 1974 United Kingdom general election in Scotland
- February 1974 United Kingdom general election in Wales
- February 1974 United Kingdom general election in Northern Ireland
