= Opinion polling for the 1974 United Kingdom general elections =

Opinion polling for both the February and October 1974 United Kingdom general elections was carried out by various organisations to gauge voting intention. Such polls are listed in this article, ranging from the previous election on 18 June 1970 to the first polling day on 28 February 1974, and again up to the second polling day on 10 October 1974.

== October 1974 general election ==
=== Graphical summary ===

Date(s) conducted	Pollster	Client	Con	Lab	Lib	Lead
10 Oct 1974	October 1974 general election (Note: GB result only)		36.6%	40.2%	18.8%	3.6
9 Oct	ORC	Evening Standard	34.4%	41.8%	19.4%	7.4
8–9 Oct	Harris	Daily Express	34.6%	43%	19.3%	8.4
8 Oct	ORC	The Times	35%	44%	17%	9
8 Oct	Marplan	The Sun	33.3%	43.8%	19.5%	10.5
3–7 Oct	Gallup	The Daily Telegraph	36%	41.5%	19%	5.5
5–6 Oct	ORC	Evening Standard	33%	43%	20%	10
5–6 Oct	Harris	Daily Express	33.5%	43.5%	20%	10
2–5 Oct	NOP	Daily Mail	31%	45.5%	19.5%	14.5
4 Oct	Marplan	News of the World	33.1%	42.9%	19.7%	9.8
2–3 Oct	Harris	London Weekend Television	34%	43%	20%	9
28 Sep – 3 Oct	Gallup	The Daily Telegraph	37%	42.5%	17.5%	5.5
2 Oct	Business Decisions	The Observer	35.5%	40%	20%	4.5
27–30 Sep	Gallup	The Daily Telegraph	35%	42.5%	19%	7.5
26–29 Sep	ORC	The Times	33%	42%	21%	9
26–29 Sep	Harris	Daily Express	35%	43.5%	18.5%	8.5
25–27 Sep	NOP	N/A	33%	44%	22%	11
19–26 Sep	Gallup	The Daily Telegraph	39%	44%	15%	5
25 Sep	Business Decisions	The Observer	36%	40%	20%	4
25 Sep	Harris	London Weekend Television	34%	43%	20%	9
19–22 Sep	Gallup	The Daily Telegraph	37.5%	42.5%	18%	5
19–22 Sep	ORC	Evening Standard	31%	45%	20%	14
18–22 Sep	Harris	Daily Express	36.5%	42.5%	19%	6
20 Sep	Dissolution of Parliament and the official start of the election campaign					
19 Sep	Business Decisions	The Observer	36%	39.5%	20%	3.5
18–19 Sep	Harris	London Weekend Television	33%	45%	19%	12
18–19 Sep	ORC	The Sunday Times	35%	43%	19%	8
18 Sep	Prime Minister Harold Wilson announces a snap general election for 10 October					
11–17 Sep	Gallup	The Daily Telegraph	34%	42%	20.5%	8
10–15 Sep	ORC	The Times	34%	38%	23%	4
10–15 Sep	NOP	Daily Mail	32%	46.6%	18.2%	14.6
11–12 Sep	NOP	N/A	41%	40%	16%	1
11–12 Sep	ORC	The Sunday Times	36%	46%	16%	10
28 Aug – 4 Sep	Gallup	The Daily Telegraph	37.5%	40.5%	18%	3
Aug	ORC	Evening Standard	34%	40.5%	21%	6.5
31 Aug	NOP	N/A	39.1%	37%	19.1%	2.1
8–12 Aug	Gallup	The Daily Telegraph	35.5%	39.5%	21%	4
Jul	ORC	Evening Standard	37%	37%	22%	Tie
23–28 Jul	NOP	N/A	35.4%	44.8%	18.2%	9.4
10–15 Jul	Gallup	The Daily Telegraph	35%	38%	21%	3
Jun	Harris	Daily Express	35.5%	42%	20.5%	6.5
Jun	ORC	Evening Standard	34%	46%	18%	12
18–23 Jun	NOP	N/A	37.7%	45.8%	14%	8.1
12–17 Jun	Gallup	The Daily Telegraph	35.5%	44%	17%	8.5
May	ORC	Evening Standard	35%	45%	16%	10
23 May	Newham South by-election					
8–13 May	Gallup	The Daily Telegraph	33%	46.5%	17%	13.5
7 May	Local elections in Scotland					
2 May	Local elections in London					
Apr	ORC	Evening Standard	35.5%	42.5%	18%	7
9–16 Apr	Gallup	The Daily Telegraph	33%	49%	15.5%	16
2–7 Apr	NOP	N/A	36.4%	45.1%	16.5%	8.7
Mar	ORC	Evening Standard	35%	44%	17%	9
19–24 Mar	NOP	N/A	33.6%	47.7%	15%	14.1
13–18 Mar	Gallup	The Daily Telegraph	35%	43%	19%	8
12–17 Mar	NOP	N/A	35.7%	43.3%	17.9%	7.6
7 Mar	Three Day Week restrictions end					
28 Feb 1974	February 1974 general election (Note: GB result only)		38.6%	38.0%	19.8%	0.6

Data is sourced from PollBase.

== February 1974 general election ==
=== 1974 ===
Date(s) conducted	Pollster	Client	Con	Lab	Lib	Lead
28 Feb 1974	February 1974 general election (Note: GB result only)		38.6%	38.0%	19.8%	0.6
27 Feb	Marplan	London Weekend Television	36.5%	34.5%	25%	2
Feb	ORC	The Times	38.7%	34.9%	23%	3.8
27 Feb	ORC	Evening Standard	39.7%	36.7%	21.2%	3
26–27 Feb	Gallup	The Daily Telegraph	39.5%	37.5%	20.5%	2
26–27 Feb	Harris	Daily Express	40.2%	35.2%	22%	7
Feb	Harris	Daily Express	38%	34.5%	25%	3.5
Feb	ORC	Evening Standard	36.5%	35%	25.5%	1.5
23–27 Feb	NOP	Daily Mail	39.5%	35.5%	22%	4
23–26 Feb	NOP	Daily Mail	40.5%	35.5%	22%	5
Feb	Marplan	London Weekend Television	38.5%	31.5%	28%	7
21 Feb	Business Decisions	The Observer	35%	37.5%	23.5%	2.5
18–21 Feb	Gallup	The Daily Telegraph	42%	40%	16.5%	2
Feb	Harris	Daily Express	40%	33.5%	23.5%	6.5
16–18 Feb	Gallup	The Daily Telegraph	41%	40.5%	16.5%	0.5
14–17 Feb	NOP	Daily Mail	43.4%	37.8%	16.9%	5.6
Feb	ORC	Evening Standard	41%	35%	21%	6
Feb	Harris	Daily Express	43.5%	38%	17%	5.5
Feb	Business Decisions	The Observer	40.5%	38%	19.5%	2.5
Feb	Marplan	London Weekend Television	44%	35%	17%	9
12–14 Feb	Gallup	The Daily Telegraph	42.5%	41.5%	14%	1
12–13 Feb	Harris	Daily Express	46%	35%	18%	11
8–11 Feb	Gallup	The Daily Telegraph	44.5%	43%	11%	1.5
8–10 Feb	ORC	The Times	42%	40%	16%	2
8–9 Feb	Marplan	London Weekend Television	45%	39%	12%	6
7 Feb	Dissolution of Parliament and the official start of the election campaign					
7 Feb	Business Decisions	The Observer	44.9%	37.2%	11.9%	7.7
1–4 Feb	Gallup	The Daily Telegraph	39.5%	42.5%	16%	3
Jan	Harris	Daily Express	41%	37%	20%	4
Jan	ORC	Evening Standard	41%	37%	19%	4
8–13 Jan	NOP	Daily Mail	39.4%	42%	16.5%	2.6
8–13 Jan	Gallup	The Daily Telegraph	40%	38%	19%	2

=== 1973 ===
Date(s) conducted	Pollster	Client	Con	Lab	Lib	Lead
Dec	Harris	Daily Express	36%	38.5%	23%	2.5
Dec	ORC	Evening Standard	35%	40%	23%	5
12–18 Dec	Gallup	The Daily Telegraph	36%	42.5%	18.5%	6.5
27 Nov – 2 Dec	NOP	Daily Mail	35.6%	43.2%	20%	7.6
Nov	ORC	Evening Standard	33%	38.5%	25.5%	5.5
18 Nov	NOP	Daily Mail	36.5%	39.9%	21.2%	3.4
14–18 Nov	Gallup	The Daily Telegraph	36.5%	38.5%	22.5%	2
8 Nov	Berwick-upon-Tweed, Edinburgh North, Glasgow Govan and Hove by-elections					
Oct	ORC	Evening Standard	33%	37.5%	27.5%	4.5
23–28 Oct	NOP	Daily Mail	37.5%	39.7%	21.3%	2.2
17–21 Oct	Gallup	The Daily Telegraph	33%	39.5%	25.5%	6.5
13 Oct	NOP	Daily Mail	34.2%	35.4%	29.1%	1.2
Sep	ORC	Evening Standard	30.5%	38%	29%	7.5
5–9 Sep	Gallup	The Daily Telegraph	33.5%	43%	22%	9.5
4–9 Sep	NOP	Daily Mail	33.9%	40.9%	23.8%	7
Aug	ORC	Evening Standard	30%	41%	26%	11
7–15 Aug	NOP	Daily Mail	28.9%	41.7%	27.6%	12.8
8–12 Aug	Gallup	The Daily Telegraph	31.5%	38%	28%	6.5
26 Jul	Isle of Ely and Ripon by-elections					
Jul	ORC	Evening Standard	38.5%	39%	18.5%	0.5
11–15 Jul	Gallup	The Daily Telegraph	35.5%	45%	17.5%	9.5
27 Jun	Manchester Exchange by-election					
Jun	ORC	Evening Standard	39%	37%	21%	2
19–24 Jun	NOP	Daily Mail	39.3%	43.9%	14.8%	4.6
12–17 Jun	NOP	Daily Mail	41.3%	41.6%	15.7%	0.3
6–10 Jun	Gallup	The Daily Telegraph	41%	42%	14.5%	1
7 Jun	Final round of local elections in England and Wales					
30 May	Local elections in Northern Ireland					
24 May	West Bromwich and Westhoughton by-elections					
May	Harris	Daily Express	37%	45%	16%	8
May	ORC	Evening Standard	34%	41%	22%	7
10–13 May	Gallup	The Daily Telegraph	38%	43.5%	14.5%	5.5
10 May	Further local elections in England and Wales					
1–6 May	NOP	Daily Mail	31.9%	50.1%	16.9%	18.2
1 May	Local elections in Scotland					
Apr	ORC	Evening Standard	36%	41%	20%	5
Apr	Harris	Daily Express	38%	42%	17%	4
11–15 Apr	Gallup	The Daily Telegraph	38%	41%	17.5%	3
10–16 Apr	NOP	Daily Mail	36.6%	45%	17%	8.4
12 Apr	Local elections in England and Wales and Greater London Council election					
Mar	ORC	Evening Standard	38%	43%	16%	5
Mar	Harris	Daily Express	36%	47%	15%	11
9–12 Mar	Gallup	The Daily Telegraph	39%	43%	16%	4
6–11 Mar	NOP	Daily Mail	38%	45.2%	14.9%	7.2
8 Mar	1973 Northern Ireland border poll					
1 Mar	Chester-le-Street, Dundee East and Lincoln by-elections					
Feb	Harris	Daily Express	39%	46%	14%	7
Feb	ORC	Evening Standard	39%	41%	17%	2
8–11 Feb	Gallup	The Daily Telegraph	38%	47%	12.5%	9
Jan	Harris	Daily Express	37%	47%	14%	10
Jan	ORC	Evening Standard	39%	41%	17%	2
23–28 Jan	NOP	Daily Mail	39.9%	42.7%	15.4%	2.8
9–15 Jan	NOP	Daily Mail	39.4%	39%	20.6%	0.4
10–14 Jan	Gallup	The Daily Telegraph	38.5%	44%	15.5%	5.5

=== 1972 ===
Date(s) conducted	Pollster	Client	Con	Lab	Lib	Lead
Dec	ORC	Evening Standard	36%	45%	16%	9
12–18 Dec	NOP	Daily Mail	39.7%	42.6%	15.7%	2.9
6–10 Dec	Gallup	The Daily Telegraph	38%	46.5%	12.5%	8.5
7 Dec	Sutton and Cheam and Uxbridge by-elections					
28 Nov – 4 Dec	NOP	Daily Mail	37%	47.4%	13.7%	10.4
Nov	Harris	Daily Express	40%	46%	12%	6
Nov	ORC	Evening Standard	37%	45%	16%	8
14–20 Nov	Gallup	The Daily Telegraph	40.5%	45.4%	12.9%	4.9
9–12 Nov	Gallup	The Daily Telegraph	37.5%	45.5%	15%	8
Oct	Harris	Daily Express	37%	50%	11%	13
Oct – 2 Nov	NOP	Daily Mail	36.7%	50.5%	11.2%	13.8
26 Oct	Rochdale by-election					
18–22 Oct	Gallup	The Daily Telegraph	40%	48%	8.5%	8
10–26 Oct	NOP	Daily Mail	38.6%	49.7%	9.9%	11.1
Sep	Harris	Daily Express	40%	48%	11%	8
Sep	ORC	Evening Standard	39%	46%	12%	7
12–17 Sep	NOP	Daily Mail	35.7%	53.5%	9.1%	17.8
3–17 Sep	Gallup	The Daily Telegraph	38.5%	49.5%	9.5%	11
Aug	Harris	Daily Express	41%	49%	9%	8
Aug	ORC	Evening Standard	44%	49%	6%	5
9–13 Aug	Gallup	The Daily Telegraph	40%	49%	7.5%	9
Jul	Harris	Daily Express	42%	48%	9%	6
Jul	ORC	Evening Standard	37%	50%	10%	13
25–30 Jul	NOP	Daily Mail	41%	47%	10%	6
12–16 Jul	Gallup	The Daily Telegraph	41%	47%	10%	6
Jun	Harris	Daily Express	38%	52%	9%	14
Jun	ORC	Evening Standard	42%	46%	10%	4
8–11 Jun	Gallup	The Daily Telegraph	41%	47%	10%	6
May	Harris	Daily Express	44%	47%	8%	3
May	ORC	Evening Standard	43%	44.5%	10.5%	1.5
11–14 May	NOP	Daily Mail	40.5%	46.5%	11%	6
2–7 May	NOP	Daily Mail	40.9%	46.9%	10.8%	6
4 May	Kingston-upon-Thames and Southwark by-elections					
May	Local elections					
Apr	Harris	Daily Express	42%	50%	6%	8
Apr	ORC	Evening Standard	40%	51%	7%	11
12–16 Apr	Gallup	The Daily Telegraph	43.5%	44.5%	10%	1
11–16 Apr	NOP	Daily Mail	44.8%	46.8%	7.5%	2
13 Apr	Merthyr Tydfil by-election					
Mar	Harris	Daily Express	41%	50%	8%	9
Mar	ORC	Evening Standard	39%	49%	10%	10
8–12 Mar	Gallup	The Daily Telegraph	39.5%	48.5%	9.5%	9
Feb	Harris	Daily Express	39%	53%	7%	14
Feb	ORC	Evening Standard	35%	55%	8%	20
15–20 Feb	NOP	Daily Mail	42%	49%	8%	7
9–13 Feb	Gallup	The Daily Telegraph	40.5%	49%	8.5%	8.5
Jan	Harris	Daily Express	43%	49%	7%	6
Jan	ORC	Evening Standard	43%	47%	8%	4
24–30 Jan	NOP	Daily Mail	39.1%	49.8%	9.6%	10.7
12–16 Jan	Gallup	The Daily Telegraph	40.5%	48%	9%	7.5
11–16 Jan	NOP	Daily Mail	42.7%	49.4%	6.8%	6.7

=== 1971 ===
Date(s) conducted	Pollster	Client	Con	Lab	Lib	Lead
Dec	ORC	Evening Standard	39.5%	49.5%	9%	10
8–12 Dec	Gallup	The Daily Telegraph	42%	48%	7.5%	6
Nov	Harris	Daily Express	38%	54%	7%	16
Nov	ORC	Evening Standard	40%	51%	7.5%	11
23–29 Nov	NOP	Daily Mail	38.8%	51.8%	8.4%	13
10–14 Nov	Gallup	The Daily Telegraph	42.5%	48.5%	7%	6
Oct	Harris	Daily Express	40%	52%	7%	10
Oct	ORC	Evening Standard	42%	48%	8%	6
13–17 Oct	Gallup	The Daily Telegraph	40%	50%	8%	10
Sep	Harris	Daily Express	42%	50%	7%	8
Sep	ORC	Evening Standard	42%	46%	9%	4
30 Sep	Macclesfield by-election					
23 Sep	Widnes by-election					
16–20 Sep	Gallup	The Daily Telegraph	35%	54%	8.5%	19
16 Sep	Stirling and Falkirk by-election					
14–20 Sep	NOP	Daily Mail	41.8%	49.3%	7.9%	7.5
Aug	Harris	Daily Express	42%	50%	7%	8
Aug	ORC	Evening Standard	42%	47%	9%	5
11–15 Aug	Gallup	The Daily Telegraph	42%	48.5%	7%	6.5
Jul	Harris	Daily Express	42%	51%	7%	9
Jul	ORC	Evening Standard	39%	50%	8%	11
9–12 Jul	Gallup	The Daily Telegraph	33.5%	55%	8.5%	21.5
6–12 Jul	NOP	Daily Mail	38.1%	53.7%	7.6%	15.6
8 Jul	Greenwich by-election					
Jun	Harris	Daily Express	36%	57%	5%	21
Jun	ORC	Evening Standard	40%	51%	7%	11
17 Jun	Hayes and Harlington by-election					
8–14 Jun	NOP	Daily Mail	38.3%	52%	7.9%	13.7
10–13 Jun	Gallup	The Daily Telegraph	36%	54%	8%	18
May	Harris	Daily Express	39%	54%	7%	15
May	ORC	Evening Standard	45%	45%	8%	Tie
27 May	Bromsgrove and Goole by-elections					
May	NOP	Daily Mail	40.7%	51.7%	6.6%	11
13–16 May	Gallup	The Daily Telegraph	38%	50%	9.5%	12
May	Local elections					
Apr	Harris	Daily Express	44%	47%	7%	3
Apr	ORC	Evening Standard	48.5%	41.5%	8.5%	7
13–19 Apr	NOP	Daily Mail	42%	48.8%	7.3%	6.8
8–13 Apr	Gallup	The Daily Telegraph	44%	45.5%	9.5%	1.5
1–4 Apr	Gallup	The Daily Telegraph	44.5%	48%	6%	3.5
1 Apr	Liverpool Scotland and Arundel and Shoreham by-elections					
Mar	Harris	Daily Express	42%	49%	8%	7
Mar	ORC	Evening Standard	41%	46%	11%	5
11–14 Mar	Gallup	The Daily Telegraph	38.5%	50.5%	8%	12
9–15 Mar	NOP	Daily Mail	39.9%	50.4%	8.9%	10.5
Feb	Harris	Daily Express	41%	49%	8%	8
Feb	ORC	Evening Standard	41.5%	48%	9%	6.5
8–14 Feb	Gallup	The Daily Telegraph	41.5%	49%	8%	7.5
Jan	Harris	Daily Express	42%	49%	8%	7
Jan	ORC	Evening Standard	45%	45%	9%	Tie
14–17 Jan	Gallup	The Daily Telegraph	42.5%	47%	8.5%	4.5
12–18 Jan	NOP	Daily Mail	46.3%	44.3%	8.3%	2

=== 1970 ===
Date(s) conducted	Pollster	Client	Con	Lab	Lib	Lead
Dec	ORC	Evening Standard	41.5%	47%	9.5%	5.5
10–13 Dec	Gallup	The Daily Telegraph	46%	44.5%	6%	1.5
Nov	Harris	Daily Express	45%	48%	7%	3
Nov	ORC	Evening Standard	51%	40%	7%	11
19 Nov	Enfield West by-election					
12–15 Nov	Gallup	The Daily Telegraph	43.5%	48%	6.5%	4.5
Oct	Harris	Daily Express	48%	44%	7%	4
Oct	ORC	Evening Standard	48%	43%	7%	5
22 Oct	St Marylebone by-election					
16–18 Oct	Gallup	The Daily Telegraph	46.5%	46.5%	6.5%	Tie
13–18 Oct	NOP	Daily Mail	45.8%	46.6%	6.7%	0.8
Sep	Harris	Daily Express	49%	45%	5%	4
Sep	ORC	Evening Standard	50%	42%	6%	8
10–13 Sep	Gallup	The Daily Telegraph	46.5%	44%	8%	2.5
Aug	ORC	Evening Standard	49%	41%	8%	8
13–16 Aug	Gallup	The Daily Telegraph	47%	43.5%	7.5%	3.5
11–16 Aug	NOP	Daily Mail	47.3%	44.2%	6.9%	3.1
Jul	ORC	Evening Standard	51%	40%	8%	11
7–13 Jul	NOP	Daily Mail	51.2%	40.4%	6.5%	10.8
18 Jun 1970	1970 general election (Note: GB result only)		46.2%	43.8%	7.6%	2.4

Data is sourced from PollBase.
