= February 1974 United Kingdom general election in Northern Ireland =

- 28 February 1974

All 12 Northern Ireland seats in the House of Commons
- Turnout: 69.9% (▼6.7 pp)
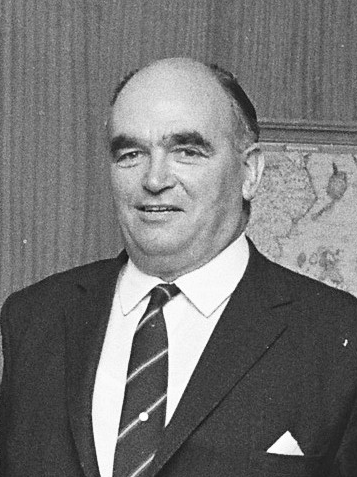

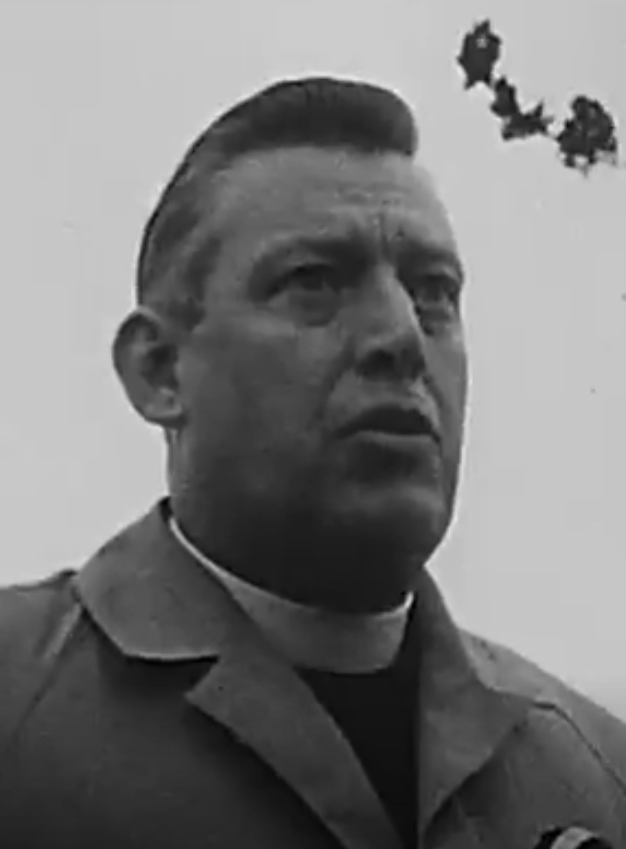
	First party	Second party
		VUPP
Leader	Harry West	William Craig
Party	UUP	Vanguard
Alliance	UUUC	UUUC
Leader since	January 1974	1973
Leader's seat	Ran in Fermanagh and South Tyrone (won)	Ran in Belfast East (won)
Last election	8 seats, 54.2%	Did not stand
Seats before	8^{†}	0^{†}
Seats won	7	3
Seat change	▼1*	▲3*
Popular vote	232,103	75,944
Percentage	32.3%	10.6%
Swing	▼22.1 pp	New Party
	Third party	Fourth party
	SDLP
Leader	Gerry Fitt	Ian Paisley
Party	SDLP	DUP
Alliance		UUUC
Leader since	1970	1971
Leader's seat	Belfast West	Antrim North
Last election	Did not stand	1 seat, 4.5%
Seats before	0^{†}	1^{†}
Seats won	1	1
Seat change	*	*
Popular vote	160,437	58,656
Percentage	22.2%	8.2%
Swing	New party	▲3.7 pp
- ^{†}Notional 1970 results if held on the 1974 boundaries *Indicates boundary change—so this is a notional figure.

On 28 February 1974, the February 1974 United Kingdom general election was held in Northern Ireland, to elect all 635 members of the House of Commons, with 12 constituencies being in Northern Ireland.

== Boundary Review ==
As part of the second periodic review of Westminster constituencies, the boundaries were changed in Northern Ireland, with the number of constituencies being unchanged in number to those used between 1955 and 1970. There were also some changes to the 12 constituency boundaries in Northern Ireland, and more widely across the United Kingdom.

As a result, however, there were no parties in Northern Ireland who saw any notional seat changes as a result of the otherwise minor alterations in seat boundaries.

== Candidates ==
Below is a table summarising the candidates of the February 1974 general election in Northern Ireland.

Affiliation	Candidates
Social Democratic and Labour Party	12
Ulster Unionist Party	7
Pro-Assembly Unionist	7
Northern Ireland Labour Party	5
Republican Clubs	4
Vanguard Progressive Unionist Party	3
Alliance Party of Northern Ireland	3
Democratic Unionist Party	2
Unity	2
Independent	1
Independent Republican	1
Independent Socialist	1
Total	48

== Analysis ==
The election took place soon after the Sunningdale Agreement, signed 9 December 1973. On 1 January 1974, an Executive was formed under the terms of the Agreement, based on the result of the 1973 Northern Ireland Assembly election, with Ulster Unionist Party leader Brian Faulkner as Chief Executive. It had six members from the UUP, four from the nationalist SDLP and one from the Alliance Party. These parties had both been founded in 1970.

Later in January 1974, the Ulster Unionist Council voted against participation in the Executive and Faulkner lost the leadership of the UUP to Harry West. West formed the United Ulster Unionist Council with the Vanguard Unionist Progressive Party (VUPP), founded in 1972 by William Craig, and the Democratic Unionist Party (DUP), founded in 1971 by Ian Paisley. They agreed that only one anti-Sunningdale Unionist would stand in each constituency. This strategy proved successful, with the UUUC winning 11 of the 12 seats. Seven supporters of Faulkner stood as Pro-Assembly Unionists, including outgoing MPs Stanley McMaster and Rafton Pounder.

On the nationalist side, former Republican Labour Party leader Gerry Fitt had formed the Social Democratic and Labour Party (SDLP). Fitt held his seat in Belfast West, but the split in the nationalist vote in Fermanagh and South Tyrone allowed Harry West to gain a seat from Unity. Bernadette McAliskey, who had held a seat for Unity since 1969 for Mid Ulster, contested as an independent but lost, again where a split in the nationalist vote allowed a new Unionist MP to gain.

In the election as a whole, the Conservative Party failed to return to government and the Labour Party formed a minority government led by Harold Wilson as Prime Minister.

== Results ==
Party	Seats					Aggregate Votes		
Party	Total	Gains	Losses	Net	Of total (%)	Total	Of total (%)	Change (%)
UUP	7	1	2	▼1	58.3	232,103	32.1	▼22.1
SDLP	1	New		▲1	8.3	160,437	22.2	New
Pro-Assembly Unionist	0	New			—	94,301	13.0	New
Vanguard	3	New		▲3	25.0	75,944	10.5	New
DUP	1	0	0	Steady	8.3	58,656	8.2	▲3.7 (Note: compared with the Protestant Unionist Party in 1970.)
Alliance	0	New			—	22,660	3.1	New
Unity	0	0	2	▼2	—	17,593	2.5	▼15.6
NI Labour	0	0	0	Steady	—	17,284	2.4	▼10.2
Ind. Socialist	0	New			—	16,672	2.3	New
Republican Clubs	0	New			—	15,152	2.1	New
Ind. Republican	0	Did not stand in 1970			—	5,662	0.8	—N/a
Independent	0	0	0	Steady	—	1,162	0.2	▼0.3
Other	0	—N/a		▼1 (Note: 1 Republican Labour Party seat, however MP Gerry Fitt won as a SDLP MP.)	—	0	0.0	—N/a
Blank and invalid votes						4,656	—	—
Total	12			0	100.0	717,626 (Note: All valid votes excluding spoiled votes.)	100.0	0.0
Registered voters, and turnout						1,027,155	69.9	▼6.7

=== Popular vote ===
Popular vote
UUP	32.3%
SDLP	22.4%
PAU	13.1%
Vanguard	10.6%
DUP	8.2%
APNI	3.2%
Unity	2.5%
NI Labour	2.4%
Republican Clubs	2.1%
Other	3.3%

Popular vote (alliances)
UUUC	51.1%
SDLP	22.4%
PAU	13.1%
APNI	3.2%
Unity	2.5%
NI Labour	2.4%
Republican Clubs	2.1%
Other	3.3%

=== Parliament seats ===
Parliamentary seats
UUP	58.3%
Vanguard	25.0%
SDLP	8.3%
DUP	8.3%

Parliamentary seats
UUUC	91.7%
SDLP	8.3%

== MPs elected ==
Constituency	Party	MP
Antrim North	DUP	Ian Paisley
Antrim South	UUP	James Molyneaux
Armagh	UUP	Harold McCusker
Belfast East	Vanguard	William Craig
Belfast North	UUP	John Carson
Belfast South	Vanguard	Robert Bradford
Belfast West	SDLP	Gerry Fitt
Down North	UUP	Jim Kilfedder
Down South	UUP	Lawrence Orr
Fermanagh and South Tyrone	UUP	Harry West
Londonderry	UUP	William Ross
Mid Ulster	Vanguard	John Dunlop

== See also ==
- February 1974 United Kingdom general election in England
- February 1974 United Kingdom general election in Scotland
- February 1974 United Kingdom general election in Wales
