= List of United Kingdom Parliament constituencies (1974–1983) =

Constituencies in 1955–1974 | Feb 1974 MPs | Oct 1974 MPs | 1979 MPs | Constituencies in 1983–1997

This is a list of all constituencies that were in existence in the February 1974, October 1974 and 1979 General Elections.

Table of contents:

A B C D E F G H I J K L M N O P Q R S T U V W X Y Z

== A ==
Constituency	Region	Successor
Aberavon	Glamorgan	same constituency
Aberdare	Glamorgan	
Aberdeen North	Aberdeenshire	same constituency
Aberdeen South	Aberdeenshire	same constituency
Aberdeenshire East	Aberdeenshire	
Aberdeenshire West	Aberdeenshire	
Abertillery	Monmouthshire	
Abingdon	Berkshire	
Accrington	Lancashire	
Aldershot	Hampshire	same constituency
Aldridge-Brownhills	Staffordshire	same constituency
Altrincham and Sale	Cheshire	same constituency
Anglesey	Anglesey	known as Ynys Môn
Angus North and Mearns	Angus and Kincardineshire	
Angus South	Angus	
Antrim North	Northern Ireland	
Antrim South	Northern Ireland	
Argyll	Argyll	
Armagh	Northern Ireland	
Arundel	Sussex	
Ashfield	Nottinghamshire	
Ashford	Kent	
Ashton-under-Lyne	Lancashire	
Aylesbury	Buckinghamshire	
Ayr	Ayrshire	
Ayrshire Central	Ayrshire	
Ayrshire North and Bute	Ayrshire and Buteshire	
Ayrshire South	Ayrshire	

== B ==
Constituency	Region	Successor
Banbury	Oxfordshire	
Banffshire	Banffshire	
Barking	Greater London	
Barkston Ash	Yorkshire, North Riding	
Barnsley	Yorkshire, West Riding	
Barrow-in-Furness	Lancashire	
Barry	Glamorgan	
Basildon	Essex	
Basingstoke	Hampshire	
Bassetlaw	Nottinghamshire	
Bath	Somerset	
Batley and Morley	Yorkshire, West Riding	
Battersea North	Greater London	
Battersea South	Greater London	
Beaconsfield	Buckinghamshire	
Bebington and Ellesmere Port	Cheshire	
Beckenham	Greater London	
Bedford	Bedfordshire	
Bedfordshire Mid	Bedfordshire	
Bedfordshire South	Bedfordshire	
Bedwellty	Monmouthshire	
Beeston	Nottinghamshire	
Belfast East	Northern Ireland	
Belfast North	Northern Ireland	
Belfast South	Northern Ireland	
Belfast West	Northern Ireland	
Belper	Derbyshire	
Bermondsey	Greater London	
Berwick and East Lothian	Berwickshire and East Lothian	
Berwick-upon-Tweed	Northumberland	
Bethnal Green and Bow	Greater London	
Bexleyheath	Greater London	
Birkenhead	Cheshire	
Birmingham Edgbaston	Warwickshire	
Birmingham Erdington	Warwickshire	
Birmingham Hall Green	Warwickshire	
Birmingham Handsworth	Warwickshire	
Birmingham Ladywood	Warwickshire	
Birmingham Northfield	Warwickshire	
Birmingham Perry Barr	Warwickshire	
Birmingham Selly Oak	Warwickshire	
Birmingham Small Heath	Warwickshire	
Birmingham Sparkbrook	Warwickshire	
Birmingham Stechford	Warwickshire	
Birmingham Yardley	Warwickshire	
Bishop Auckland	County Durham	
Blaby	Leicestershire	
Blackburn	Lancashire	
Blackpool North	Lancashire	
Blackpool South	Lancashire	
Blaydon	County Durham	
Blyth	Northumberland	
Bodmin	Cornwall	
Bolsover	Derbyshire	
Bolton East	Lancashire	
Bolton West	Lancashire	
Bootle	Lancashire	
Bosworth	Leicestershire	
Bothwell	Lanarkshire	
Bournemouth East	Hampshire	
Bournemouth West	Hampshire	
Bradford North	Yorkshire, West Riding	
Bradford South	Yorkshire, West Riding	
Bradford West	Yorkshire, West Riding	
Braintree	Essex	
Brecon and Radnor	Breconshire and Radnorshire	
Brent East	Greater London	
Brent North	Greater London	
Brent South	Greater London	
Brentford and Isleworth	Greater London	
Brentwood and Ongar	Essex	
Bridgwater	Somerset	
Bridlington	Yorkshire, East Riding	
Brigg and Scunthorpe	Lincolnshire	
Brighouse and Spenborough	Yorkshire, West Riding	
Brighton Kemptown	Sussex	
Brighton Pavilion	Sussex	
Bristol North East	Gloucestershire	
Bristol North West	Gloucestershire	
Bristol South	Gloucestershire	
Bristol South East	Gloucestershire	
Bristol West	Gloucestershire	
Bromsgrove and Redditch	Worcestershire	
Buckingham	Buckinghamshire	
Burnley	Lancashire	
Burton	Staffordshire	
Bury and Radcliffe	Lancashire	
Bury St Edmunds	Suffolk	same constituency

== C ==
Constituency	Region	Successor
Caernarfon	Caernarfonshire	
Caerphilly	Glamorgan	
Caithness and Sutherland	Caithness and Sutherland	
Cambridge	Cambridgeshire	
Cambridgeshire	Cambridgeshire	
Cannock	Staffordshire	
Canterbury	Kent	
Cardiff North	Glamorgan	
Cardiff North West	Glamorgan	
Cardiff South East	Glamorgan	
Cardiff West	Glamorgan	
Cardigan	Cardiganshire	
Carlisle	Cumberland	
Carlton	Nottinghamshire	Gedling
Carmarthen	Carmarthenshire	
Carshalton	Greater London	
Cheadle	Cheshire	
Chelmsford	Essex	
Chelsea	Greater London	
Cheltenham	Gloucestershire	
Chertsey and Walton	Surrey	
Chesham and Amersham	Buckinghamshire	
Chester	Cheshire	
Chesterfield	Derbyshire	
Chester-le-Street	County Durham	
Chichester	Sussex	
Chingford	Greater London	
Chippenham	Wiltshire	
Chipping Barnet	Greater London	
Chislehurst	Greater London	
Chorley	Lancashire	
Christchurch and Lymington	Dorset	
Cirencester and Tewkesbury	Gloucestershire	
City of London and Westminster South	Greater London	
Cleveland and Whitby	Yorkshire, North Riding	
Clitheroe	Lancashire	
Coatbridge and Airdrie	Lanarkshire	
Colchester	Essex	
Colne Valley	Yorkshire, West Riding	
Consett	County Durham	
Conway	Caernarfonshire	
Cornwall North	Cornwall	
Coventry North East	Warwickshire	
Coventry North West	Warwickshire	
Coventry South East	Warwickshire	
Coventry South West	Warwickshire	
Crewe	Cheshire	
Crosby	Lancashire	
Croydon Central	Greater London	
Croydon North East	Greater London	
Croydon North West	Greater London	
Croydon South	Greater London	

== D ==
Constituency	Region	Successor
Dagenham	Greater London	
Darlington	County Durham	
Dartford	Kent	
Darwen	Lancashire	
Daventry	Northamptonshire	
Dearne Valley	Yorkshire, West Riding	
Denbigh	Denbighshire	
Deptford	Greater London	
Derby North	Derbyshire	
Derby South	Derbyshire	
Derbyshire North East	Derbyshire	
Derbyshire South East	Derbyshire	
Derbyshire West	Derbyshire	
Devizes	Wiltshire	
Devon North	Devon	
Devon West	Devon	
Dewsbury	Yorkshire, West Riding	
Doncaster	Yorkshire, West Riding	
Don Valley	Yorkshire, West Riding	
Dorking	Surrey	
Dorset North	Dorset	
Dorset South	Dorset	
Dorset West	Dorset	
Dover and Deal	Kent	
Down North	Northern Ireland	
Down South	Northern Ireland	
Dudley East	Worcestershire	
Dudley West	Worcestershire	
Dulwich	Greater London	
Dumfries	Dumfriesshire	
Dunbartonshire Central	Dunbartonshire	
Dunbartonshire East	Dunbartonshire	
Dunbartonshire West	Dunbartonshire	
Dundee East	Angus	
Dundee West	Angus	
Dunfermline	Fife	
Durham	County Durham	
Durham North West	County Durham	

== E ==
Constituency	Region	Successor
Ealing Acton	Greater London	
Ealing North	Greater London	
Easington	County Durham	
Eastbourne	Sussex	
East Grinstead	Sussex	
East Kilbride	Lanarkshire	
Eastleigh	Hampshire	
Ebbw Vale	Monmouthshire	
Eccles	Lancashire	
Edinburgh Central	Midlothian	
Edinburgh East	Midlothian	
Edinburgh Leith	Midlothian	
Edinburgh North	Midlothian	
Edinburgh Pentlands	Midlothian	
Edinburgh South	Midlothian	
Edinburgh West	Midlothian	
Edmonton	Greater London	
Enfield North	Greater London	
Epping Forest	Essex	
Epsom and Ewell	Surrey	
Erith and Crayford	Greater London	
Esher	Surrey	
Essex South East	Essex	
Eton and Slough	Buckinghamshire	
Exeter	Devon	
Eye	Suffolk	Suffolk Central

== F ==
Constituency	Region	Successor
Falmouth and Camborne	Cornwall	
Fareham	Hampshire	
Farnham	Surrey	
Farnworth	Lancashire	
Faversham	Kent	
Feltham and Heston	Greater London	
Fermanagh and South Tyrone	Northern Ireland	
Fife Central	Fife	
Fife East	Fife	
Finchley	Greater London	
Flint East	Flintshire	
Flint West	Flintshire	
Folkestone and Hythe	Kent	
Fulham	Greater London	
Fylde North	Lancashire	
Fylde South	Lancashire	

== G ==
Constituency	Region	Successor
Gainsborough	Lincolnshire	
Galloway	Kirkcudbrightshire and Wigtownshire	
Gateshead East	County Durham	
Gateshead West	County Durham	
Gillingham	Kent	
Glasgow Cathcart	Lanarkshire	
Glasgow Central	Lanarkshire	
Glasgow Craigton	Lanarkshire	
Glasgow Garscadden	Lanarkshire	
Glasgow Govan	Lanarkshire	
Glasgow Hillhead	Lanarkshire	
Glasgow Kelvingrove	Lanarkshire	
Glasgow Maryhill	Lanarkshire	
Glasgow Pollok	Lanarkshire	
Glasgow Provan	Lanarkshire	
Glasgow Queen's Park	Lanarkshire	
Glasgow Shettleston	Lanarkshire	
Glasgow Springburn	Lanarkshire	
Gloucester	Gloucestershire	
Gloucestershire South	Gloucestershire	
Gloucestershire West	Gloucestershire	
Goole	Yorkshire, East	
Gosport	Hampshire	
Gower	Glamorgan	
Grantham	Lincolnshire	
Gravesend	Kent	
Greenock and Port Glasgow	Renfrewshire	
Greenwich	Greater London	
Grimsby	Lincolnshire	
Guildford	Surrey	

== H ==
Constituency	Region	Successor
Hackney Central	Greater London	
Hackney North and Stoke Newington	Greater London	
Hackney South and Shoreditch	Greater London	
Halesowen and Stourbridge	Worcestershire	
Halifax	Yorkshire, West Riding	
Haltemprice	Yorkshire, East Riding	
Hamilton	Lanarkshire	
Hammersmith North	Greater London	
Hampstead	Greater London	
Harborough	Leicestershire	
Harlow	Essex	
Harrogate	Yorkshire, North Riding	
Harrow Central	Greater London	
Harrow East	Greater London	
Harrow West	Greater London	
Hartlepool	County Durham	
Harwich	Essex	
Hastings	Sussex	
Havant and Waterloo	Hampshire	
Hayes and Harlington	Greater London	
Hazel Grove	Cheshire	
Hemel Hempstead	Hertfordshire	
Hemsworth	Yorkshire, West Riding	
Hendon North	Greater London	
Hendon South	Greater London	
Henley	Oxfordshire	
Hereford	Herefordshire	
Hertford and Stevenage	Hertfordshire	
Hertfordshire East	Hertfordshire	
Hertfordshire South	Hertfordshire	
Hertfordshire South East	Hertfordshire	
Hexham	Northumberland	
Heywood and Royton	Lancashire	
High Peak	Derbyshire	
Hitchin	Hertfordshire	
Holborn and St Pancras	Greater London	
Holland and Boston	Lincolnshire	
Honiton	Devon	
Horncastle	Lincolnshire	
Hornchurch	Greater London	
Hornsey	Greater London	
Horsham and Crawley	Sussex	
Houghton-le-Spring	County Durham	
Hove	Sussex	
Howden	Yorkshire, East Riding	
Huddersfield East	Yorkshire, West Riding	
Huddersfield West	Yorkshire, West Riding	
Huntingdonshire	Huntingdonshire	
Huyton	Lancashire	

== I ==
Constituency	Region	Successor
Ilford North	Greater London	
Ilford South	Greater London	
Ilkeston	Derbyshire	
Ince	Cheshire	
Inverness	Inverness-shire	
Ipswich	Suffolk	same constituency
Isle of Ely	Cambridgeshire	
Isle of Wight	Isle of Wight	
Islington Central	Greater London	
Islington North	Greater London	
Islington South and Finsbury	Greater London	

== J ==
Constituency	Region	Successor
Jarrow	County Durham	

== K ==
Constituency	Region	Successor
Keighley	Yorkshire, West Riding	
Kensington	Greater London	
Kettering	Northamptonshire	
Kidderminster	Worcestershire	
Kilmarnock	Ayrshire	
Kingston upon Hull Central	Yorkshire, East Riding	
Kingston upon Hull East	Yorkshire, East Riding	
Kingston upon Hull West	Yorkshire, East Riding	
Kingston-upon-Thames	Greater London	
Kingswood	Gloucestershire	
Kinross and West Perthshire	Kinross-shire and Perthshire	
Kirkcaldy	Fife	
Knutsford	Cheshire	

== L ==
Constituency	Region	Successor
Lambeth Central	Greater London	
Lanark	Lanarkshire	
Lanarkshire North	Lanarkshire	
Lancaster	Lancashire	
Leeds East	Yorkshire, West Riding	
Leeds North East	Yorkshire, West Riding	
Leeds North West	Yorkshire, West Riding	
Leeds South	Yorkshire, West Riding	
Leeds South East	Yorkshire, West Riding	
Leeds West	Yorkshire, West Riding	
Leek	Staffordshire	
Leicester East	Leicestershire	
Leicester South	Leicestershire	
Leicester West	Leicestershire	
Leigh	Lancashire	
Leominster	Herefordshire	
Lewes	Sussex	
Lewisham East	Greater London	
Lewisham West	Greater London	
Leyton	Greater London	
Lichfield and Tamworth	Staffordshire	
Lincoln	Lincolnshire	
Liverpool Edge Hill	Lancashire	
Liverpool Garston	Lancashire	
Liverpool Kirkdale	Lancashire	
Liverpool Scotland Exchange	Lancashire	
Liverpool Toxteth	Lancashire	
Liverpool Walton	Lancashire	
Liverpool Wavertree	Lancashire	
Liverpool West Derby	Lancashire	
Llanelli	Carmarthenshire	
Londonderry	Northern Ireland	
Loughborough	Leicestershire	
Louth, Lincolnshire	Lincolnshire	
Lowestoft	Suffolk	Waveney and Northern half of Suffolk Coastal
Ludlow	Shropshire	
Luton East	Bedfordshire	
Luton West	Bedfordshire	

== M ==
Constituency	Region	Successor
Macclesfield	Cheshire	
Maidstone	Kent	
Maldon	Essex	
Manchester Ardwick	Lancashire	
Manchester Blackley	Lancashire	
Manchester Central	Lancashire	
Manchester Gorton	Lancashire	
Manchester Moss Side	Lancashire	
Manchester Openshaw	Lancashire	
Manchester Withington	Lancashire	
Manchester Wythenshawe	Lancashire	
Mansfield	Nottinghamshire	
Melton	Leicestershire	
Meriden	Warwickshire	
Merionethshire	Merionethshire	
Merthyr Tydfil	Glamorgan	
Middlesbrough	Yorkshire, North Riding	
Middleton and Prestwich	Lancashire	
Midlothian	Midlothian	
Mitcham and Morden	Greater London	
Monmouth	Monmouthshire	
Montgomeryshire	Montgomeryshire	
Moray and Nairn	Morayshire and Nairnshire	
Morecambe and Lonsdale	Lancashire	
Morpeth	Northumberland	
Motherwell and Wishaw	Lanarkshire	

== N ==
Constituency	Region	Successor
Nantwich	Cheshire	
Neath	Glamorgan	
Nelson and Colne	Lancashire	
Newark	Nottinghamshire	
Newbury	Berkshire	
Newcastle-under-Lyme	Staffordshire	
Newcastle upon Tyne Central	Northumberland	
Newcastle upon Tyne East	Northumberland	
Newcastle upon Tyne North	Northumberland	
Newcastle upon Tyne West	Northumberland	
New Forest	Hampshire	
Newham North East	Greater London	
Newham North West	Greater London	
Newham South	Greater London	
Newport (Monmouthshire)	Monmouthshire	
Newton	Lancashire	
Norfolk North	Norfolk	
Norfolk North West	Norfolk	
Norfolk South	Norfolk	
Norfolk South West	Norfolk	
Normanton	Yorkshire, West Riding	
Northampton North	Northamptonshire	
Northampton South	Northamptonshire	
Northwich	Cheshire	
Norwich North	Norfolk	
Norwich South	Norfolk	
Norwood	Greater London	
Nottingham East	Nottinghamshire	
Nottingham West	Nottinghamshire	
Nuneaton	Warwickshire	

== O ==
Constituency	Region	Successor
Ogmore	Glamorgan	
Oldham East	Lancashire	
Oldham West	Lancashire	
Orkney and Shetland	Orkney and Shetland	
Ormskirk	Lancashire	
Orpington	Greater London	
Oswestry	Shropshire	
Oxford	Oxfordshire	
Oxfordshire Mid	Oxfordshire	

== P ==
Constituency	Region	Successor
Paddington	Greater London	
Paisley	Renfrewshire	
Peckham	Greater London	
Pembroke	Pembrokeshire	
Penistone	Yorkshire, West Riding	
Penrith and the Border	Cumberland	
Perth and East Perthshire	Perthshire	
Peterborough	Northamptonshire	
Petersfield	Hampshire	
Plymouth Devonport	Devon	
Plymouth Drake	Devon	
Plymouth Sutton	Devon	
Pontefract and Castleford	Yorkshire, West Riding	
Pontypool	Monmouthshire	
Pontypridd	Glamorgan	
Poole	Dorset	
Portsmouth North	Hampshire	
Portsmouth South	Hampshire	
Preston North	Lancashire	
Pudsey	Yorkshire, West Riding	
Putney	Greater London	

== R ==
Constituency	Region	Successor
Ravensbourne	Greater London	
Reading North	Berkshire	
Reading South	Berkshire	
Redcar	Yorkshire, North Riding	
Reigate	Surrey	
Renfrewshire East	Renfrewshire	
Renfrewshire West	Renfrewshire	
Rhondda	Glamorgan	
Richmond upon Thames	Greater London	
Richmond (Yorks)	Yorkshire, North Riding	
Ripon	Yorkshire, North Riding	
Rochdale	Lancashire	
Rochester and Chatham	Kent	
Romford	Greater London	
Ross and Cromarty	Ross and Cromarty	
Rossendale	Lancashire	
Rotherham	Yorkshire, West Riding	
Rother Valley	Yorkshire, West Riding	
Roxburgh, Selkirk and Peebles	Roxburghshire, Selkirkshire and Peeblesshire	
Rugby	Warwickshire	
Ruislip Northwood	Greater London	
Runcorn	Cheshire	
Rushcliffe	Nottinghamshire	
Rutherglen	Lanarkshire	
Rutland and Stamford	Leicestershire	
Rye	Sussex	

== S ==
Constituency	Region	Successor
Saffron Walden	Essex	
St Albans	Hertfordshire	
St Helens	Lancashire	
St Ives	Cornwall	
St Marylebone	Greater London	
St Pancras North	Greater London	
Salford East	Lancashire	
Salford West	Lancashire	
Salisbury	Wiltshire	
Scarborough	Yorkshire, North Riding	
Sevenoaks	Kent	
Sheffield Attercliffe	Yorkshire, West Riding	
Sheffield Brightside	Yorkshire, West Riding	
Sheffield Hallam	Yorkshire, West Riding	
Sheffield Heeley	Yorkshire, West Riding	
Sheffield Hillsborough	Yorkshire, West Riding	
Sheffield Park	Yorkshire, West Riding	
Shipley	Yorkshire, West Riding	
Shoreham	Sussex	
Shrewsbury	Shropshire	
Sidcup	Greater London	
Skipton	Yorkshire, North Riding	
Solihull	Warwickshire	
Somerset North	Somerset	
Southall	Greater London	
Southampton Itchen	Hampshire	
Southampton Test	Hampshire	
Southend East	Essex	
Southend West	Essex	
Southgate	Greater London	
Southport	Lancashire	
South Shields	County Durham	
Sowerby	Yorkshire, West Riding	
Spelthorne	Surrey	
Stafford and Stone	Staffordshire	
Staffordshire South West	Staffordshire	
Stalybridge and Hyde	Cheshire	
Stepney and Poplar	Greater London	
Stirling, Falkirk and Grangemouth	Stirlingshire	
Stirlingshire East and Clackmannan	Stirlingshire and Clackmannanshire	
Stirlingshire West	Stirlingshire	
Stockport North	Cheshire	
Stockport South	Cheshire	
Stockton	County Durham	
Stoke-on-Trent Central	Staffordshire	
Stoke-on-Trent North	Staffordshire	
Stoke-on-Trent South	Staffordshire	
Stratford-on-Avon	Warwickshire	
Streatham	Greater London	
Stretford	Lancashire	
Stroud	Gloucestershire	
Sudbury and Woodbridge	Suffolk	Suffolk South and southern half of Suffolk Coastal
Sunderland North	County Durham	
Sunderland South	County Durham	
Surbiton	Greater London	
Surrey East	Surrey	
Surrey North West	Surrey	
Sussex Mid	Sussex	
Sutton and Cheam	Greater London	
Sutton Coldfield	Warwickshire	
Swansea East	Glamorgan	
Swansea West	Glamorgan	
Swindon	Wiltshire	

== T ==
Constituency	Region	Successor
Taunton	Somerset	
Thanet East	Kent	
Thanet West	Kent	
Thirsk and Malton	Yorkshire, North Riding	
Thornaby	Yorkshire, North Riding	
Thurrock	Essex	
Tiverton	Devon	
Tonbridge and Malling	Kent	
Tooting	Greater London	
Torbay	Devon	
Totnes	Devon	
Tottenham	Greater London	
Truro	Cornwall	
Tunbridge Wells	Kent	
Twickenham	Greater London	
Tynemouth	Northumberland	

== U ==
Constituency	Region	Successor
Mid Ulster	Northern Ireland	
Upminster	Greater London	
Uxbridge	Greater London	

== V ==
Constituency	Region	Successor
Vauxhall	Greater London	

== W ==
Constituency	Region	Successor
Wakefield	Yorkshire, West Riding	
Wallasey	Cheshire	
Wallsend	Northumberland	
Walsall North	Staffordshire	
Walsall South	Staffordshire	
Walthamstow	Greater London	
Wanstead and Woodford	Greater London	
Warley East	Worcestershire	
Warley West	Worcestershire	
Warrington	Lancashire	
Warwick and Leamington	Warwickshire	
Watford	Hertfordshire	
Wellingborough	Northamptonshire	
Wells	Somerset	
Welwyn and Hatfield	Hertfordshire	
West Bromwich East	Staffordshire	
West Bromwich West	Staffordshire	
Westbury	Wiltshire	
Western Isles	Inverness-shire, Ross and Cromarty	
Westhoughton	Lancashire	
West Lothian	West Lothian	
Westmorland	Westmorland	
Weston-super-Mare	Somerset	
Whitehaven	Cumberland	
Widnes	Lancashire	
Wigan	Lancashire	
Wimbledon	Greater London	
Winchester	Hampshire	
Windsor and Maidenhead	Berkshire	
Wirral	Cheshire	
Woking	Surrey	
Wokingham	Berkshire	
Wolverhampton North East	Staffordshire	
Wolverhampton South East	Staffordshire	
Wolverhampton South West	Staffordshire	
Wood Green	Greater London	
Woolwich East	Greater London	
Woolwich West	Greater London	
Worcester	Worcestershire	
Worcestershire South	Worcestershire	
Workington	Cumberland	
Worthing	Sussex	
The Wrekin	Shropshire	
Wrexham	Denbighshire	
Wycombe	Buckinghamshire	

== Y ==
Constituency	Region	Successor
Yarmouth	Norfolk	
Yeovil	Somerset	
York	Yorkshire	

Note: All regions used are those in force when the constituencies were created.
