= 1971 United Kingdom local elections =

Local elections were held in the United Kingdom in 1971, the year after the Conservatives under Edward Heath had taken office.

The opposition Labour Party, which had lost the general election in the previous year, enjoyed its best results since the 1945 local elections. They were able to win wards in cities including Glasgow, Liverpool and Manchester which they had not even in 1945, as well as some wards they had not previously contested.

The Conservatives lost overall control of councils such as Harrow, Sutton, Basildon, Havant-Waterloo and Salford which had previously been considered safe for them.

The Liberals lost seats overall, despite making striking progress in Merseyside. Both the Scottish National Party and Plaid Cymru suffered very poor results.

== See also ==
- 1971 London local elections
- 1971 Scottish local elections
