= 1967 Liberal Party leadership election =

18 January 1967	1976 →
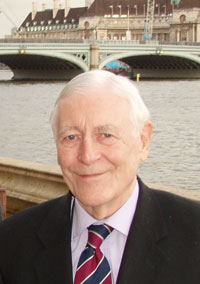
Candidate	Jeremy Thorpe	Emlyn Hooson	Eric Lubbock
Popular vote	6	3	3
Percentage	50%	25%	25%
Leader before election
Jo Grimond
Elected Leader
Jeremy Thorpe

The 1967 Liberal Party leadership election was called following the resignation of Jo Grimond, in the wake of disappointing results in the 1966 general election.

== Background ==
There were three candidates (Jeremy Thorpe, Emlyn Hooson and Eric Lubbock), who were elected by a ballot of the Liberal Parliamentary Party using Alternative Vote. Jeremy Thorpe secured the most votes in the first round, but did not win overall, as the rules said that he needed to win more than half of votes cast. Both Hooson and Lubbock's second preferences voted for one another, cancelling one another out, so faced with a deadlock, both other candidates withdrew from the contest to endorse Thorpe who was consequentially elected unopposed.

Although the vote was by a secret ballot, Liberal MP Peter Bessell later published a memoir in which he asserted that Jo Grimond, John Pardoe, David Steel, James Davidson and himself all voted for Thorpe; Alasdair Mackenzie and Russell Johnston voted for Hooson; and Michael Winstanley and Richard Wainwright voted for Lubbock. All three candidates voted for themselves. Bessell also confesses to having caused some confusion by pledging his vote to both Thorpe and Hooson, although he ultimately cast his vote for Thorpe after realising that he had greater momentum.

== First round results ==
Candidate	Votes	%
Jeremy Thorpe ✓	6	50
Emlyn Hooson	3	25
Eric Lubbock	3	25
