= Sidcup (UK Parliament constituency) =

UK Parliament constituency (1974–1983)

- Former borough constituency for the House of Commons
- County: Greater London

1974–1983
- Seats: One
- Created from: Bexley
- Replaced by: Old Bexley and Sidcup

Sidcup was a parliamentary constituency centred on Sidcup, an outer suburb of London in the London Borough of Bexley. It returned one Member of Parliament (MP) to the House of Commons of the Parliament of the United Kingdom.

The constituency was created for the February 1974 general election, and abolished for the 1983 general election, when it was partially replaced by the Old Bexley and Sidcup constituency. It was held throughout that time by Edward Heath, who was still Prime Minister for four days between the indecisive February general election and his resignation from the post on 4 March.

== Boundaries ==
The London Borough of Bexley wards of Lamorbey East, Lamorbey West, North Cray, St Mary's, Sidcup East, and Sidcup West.

== Members of Parliament ==
Election	Member	Party
Feb 1974	Edward Heath	Conservative
1983	constituency abolished	

== Election results ==
General election February 1974: Sidcup
Party	Candidate	Votes	%	±%
Conservative	Edward Heath	20,448	49.1	
Labour	Colin Frances Hargrave	10,750	25.8	
Liberal	Oliver Moxon	9,847	23.6	
Anti-EEC	Don Bennett	613	1.5	
Majority		9,698	23.3	
Turnout		41,658	84.9	
Conservative win (new seat)				

General election October 1974: Sidcup
Party	Candidate	Votes	%	±%
Conservative	Edward Heath	18,991	50.5	+1.4
Labour	William John Jennings	11,448	30.4	+4.6
Liberal	Ian Richard Philip Josephs	6,954	18.5	−5.1
Independent	Douglas Hartley Jones	174	0.5	New
Independent	Marcus John Norton	61	0.2	New
Majority		7,543	20.0	−3.2
Turnout		37,628	75.9	−9.0
Conservative hold		Swing	-3.0	

General election 1979: Sidcup
Party	Candidate	Votes	%	±%
Conservative	Edward Heath	23,692	59.8	+9.3
Labour	Francis Keohane	10,236	25.8	−4.6
Liberal	Peter Vickers	4,908	12.4	−6.1
National Front	Alan Webb	774	2.0	New
Majority		13,456	34.0	+13.9
Turnout		39,610	79.3	+3.4
Conservative hold		Swing	+6.9	

Parliament of the United Kingdom
Preceded by Bexley	Constituency represented by the prime minister 28 February – 4 March 1974	Succeeded by Huyton
Preceded by Huyton	Constituency represented by the leader of the opposition 1974–1975	Succeeded by Finchley
