= Lists of United Kingdom MPs =

The following is a partial list of United Kingdom MPs.

== By surname ==
- List of United Kingdom MPs: A
- List of United Kingdom MPs: B
- List of United Kingdom MPs: C
- List of United Kingdom MPs: D
- List of United Kingdom MPs: E
- List of United Kingdom MPs: F
- List of United Kingdom MPs: G
- List of United Kingdom MPs: H
- List of United Kingdom MPs: I
- List of United Kingdom MPs: J
- List of United Kingdom MPs: K
- List of United Kingdom MPs: L
- List of United Kingdom MPs: M
- List of United Kingdom MPs: N
- List of United Kingdom MPs: O
- List of United Kingdom MPs: P
- List of United Kingdom MPs: Q
- List of United Kingdom MPs: R
- List of United Kingdom MPs: S
- List of United Kingdom MPs: T
- List of United Kingdom MPs: U
- List of United Kingdom MPs: V
- List of United Kingdom MPs: W
- List of United Kingdom MPs: Y
- List of United Kingdom MPs: Z

== By general election ==
- List of MPs elected in the 1945 UK general election
- List of MPs elected in the 1950 UK general election
- List of MPs elected in the 1951 UK general election
- List of MPs elected in the 1955 UK general election
- List of MPs elected in the 1959 UK general election
- List of MPs elected in the 1964 UK general election
- List of MPs elected in the 1966 UK general election
- List of MPs elected in the 1970 UK general election
- List of MPs elected in the February 1974 UK general election
- List of MPs elected in the October 1974 UK general election
- List of MPs elected in the 1979 UK general election
- List of MPs elected in the 1983 UK general election
- List of MPs elected in the 1987 UK general election
- List of MPs elected in the 1992 UK general election
- List of MPs elected in the 1997 UK general election
- List of MPs elected in the 2001 UK general election
- List of MPs elected in the 2005 UK general election
- List of MPs elected in the 2010 UK general election
- List of MPs elected in the 2015 UK general election
- List of MPs elected in the 2017 UK general election
- List of MPs elected in the 2019 UK general election
- List of MPs elected in the 2024 UK general election

== By term ==
- 1st (1801–1802)
- 2nd (1802–1806)
- 3rd (1806–1807)
- 4th (1807–1812)
- 5th (1812–1818)
- 6th (1818–1820)
- 7th (1820–1826)
- 8th (1826–1830)
- 9th (1830–1831)
- 10th (1831–1832)
- 11th (1832–1835)
- 12th (1835–1837)
- 13th (1837–1841)
- 14th (1841–1847)
- 15th (1847–1852)
- 16th (1852–1857)
- 17th (1857–1859)
- 18th (1859–1865)
- 19th (1865–1868)
- 20th (1868–1874)
- 21st (1874–1880)
- 22nd (1880–1885)
- 23rd (1885–1886)
- 24th (1886–1892)
- 25th (1892–1895)
- 26th (1895–1900)
- 27th (1900–1906)
- 28th (1906–Jan. 1910)
- 29th (1910)
- 30th (Dec. 1910–1918)
- 31st (1918–1922)
- 32nd (1922–1923)
- 33rd (1923–1924)
- 34th (1924–1929)
- 35th (1929–1931)
- 36th (1931–1935)
- 37th (1935–1945)
- 38th (1945–1950)
- 39th (1950–1951)
- 40th (1951–1955)
- 41st (1955–1959)
- 42nd (1959–1964)
- 43rd (1964–1966)
- 44th (1966–1970)
- 45th (1970–Feb. 1974)
- 46th (1974)
- 47th (Oct. 1974–1979)
- 48th (1979–1983)
- 49th (1983–1987)
- 50th (1987–1992)
- 51st (1992–1997)
- 52nd (1997–2001)
- 53rd (2001–2005)
- 54th (2005–2010)
- 55th (2010–2015)
- 56th (2015–2017)
- 57th (2017–2019)
- 58th (2019–2024)
- 59th (2024–present)

== By constituency ==
=== England ===
- List of MPs for constituencies in England (2005–2010) (54th)
- List of MPs for constituencies in England (2010–2015) (55th)
- List of MPs for constituencies in England (2015–2017) (56th)
- List of MPs for constituencies in England (2017–2019) (57th)
- List of MPs for constituencies in England (2019–2024) (58th)
- List of MPs for constituencies in England (2024–present) (59th)

=== Northern Ireland ===
- List of parliamentary constituencies in Northern Ireland (overall list since 1801)
- List of MPs for constituencies in Northern Ireland (2024–present)
- List of MPs for constituencies in Northern Ireland (2019–2024)
- List of MPs for constituencies in Northern Ireland (2017–2019)
- List of MPs for constituencies in Northern Ireland (2015–2017)
- List of MPs for constituencies in Northern Ireland (2010–2015)
- List of MPs for constituencies in Northern Ireland (2005–2010)

=== Scotland ===
- List of MPs for constituencies in Scotland (1945–1950) (38th)
- List of MPs for constituencies in Scotland (1950–1951) (39th)
- List of MPs for constituencies in Scotland (1951–1955) (40th)
- List of MPs for constituencies in Scotland (1955–1959) (41st)
- List of MPs for constituencies in Scotland (1959–1964) (42nd)
- List of MPs for constituencies in Scotland (1964–1966) (43rd)
- List of MPs for constituencies in Scotland (1966–1970) (44th)
- List of MPs for constituencies in Scotland (1970–February 1974) (45th)
- List of MPs for constituencies in Scotland (February 1974–October 1974) (46th)
- List of MPs for constituencies in Scotland (October 1974–1979) (47th)
- List of MPs for constituencies in Scotland (1979–1983) (48th)
- List of MPs for constituencies in Scotland (1983–1987) (49th)
- List of MPs for constituencies in Scotland (1987–1992) (50th)
- List of MPs for constituencies in Scotland (1992–1997) (51st)
- List of MPs for constituencies in Scotland (1997–2001) (52nd)
- List of MPs for constituencies in Scotland (2001–2005) (53rd)
- List of MPs for constituencies in Scotland (2005–2010) (54th)
- List of MPs for constituencies in Scotland (2010–2015) (55th)
- List of MPs for constituencies in Scotland (2015–2017) (56th)
- List of MPs for constituencies in Scotland (2017–2019) (57th)
- List of MPs for constituencies in Scotland (2019–2024) (58th)
- List of MPs for constituencies in Scotland (2024–present) (59th)

=== Wales ===
- 1st (1801–1802)
- 2nd (1802–1806)
- 3rd (1806–1807)
- 4th (1807–1812)
- 5th (1812–1818)
- 6th (1818–1820)
- 7th (1820–1826)
- 8th (1826–1830)
- 9th (1830–1831)
- 10th (1831–1832)
- 11th (1832–1835)
- 12th (1835–1837)
- 13th (1837–1841)
- 14th (1841–1847)
- 15th (1847–1852)
- 16th (1852–1857)
- 17th (1857–1859)
- 18th (1859–1865)
- 19th (1865–1868)
- 20th (1868–1874)
- 21st (1874–1880)
- 22nd (1880–1885)
- 23rd (1885–1886)
- 24th (1886–1892)
- 25th (1892–1895)
- 26th (1895–1900)
- 27th (1900–1906)
- 28th (1906–January 1910)
- 29th (January 1910–December 1910)
- 30th (December 1910–1918)
- 31st (1918–1922)
- 32nd (1922–1923)
- 33rd (1923–1924)
- 34th (1924–1929)
- 35th (1929–1931)
- 36th (1931–1935)
- 37th (1935–1945)
- 38th (1945–1950)
- 39th (1950–1951)
- 40th (1951–1955)
- 41st (1955–1959)
- 42nd (1959–1964)
- 43rd (1964–1966)
- 44th (1966–1970)
- 45th (1970–February 1974)
- 46th (February 1974–October 1974)
- 47th (October 1974–1979)
- 48th (1979–1983)
- 49th (1983–1987)
- 50th (1987–1992)
- 51st (1992–1997)
- 52nd (1997–2001)
- 53rd (2001–2005)
- 54th (2005–2010)
- 55th (2010–2015)
- 56th (2015–2017)
- 57th (2017–2019)
- 58th (2019–2024)
- 59th (2024–present)

== Other lists ==
- Category:British MPs
- List of MPs for Northern Ireland
- List of MPs for Scotland
- List of MPs for Wales
- List of British MPs not elected from a major party
- List of current United Kingdom MPs
- List of United Kingdom MPs who died in the 1990s
- List of United Kingdom MPs who died in the 2000s
- List of United Kingdom MPs who died in the 2010s
- List of United Kingdom MPs who died in the 2020s
