= List of MPs for constituencies in Wales (1983–1987) =

- Colours on map indicate the party allegiance of each constituency's MP.

This is a list of members of Parliament in Wales, elected for the Forty Ninth Parliament of the United Kingdom in the 1983 general election.

== List ==
MP	Constituency	Party	In constituency since
Leo Abse	Torfaen	Labour Party	1958 by-election
Donald Anderson	Swansea East	Labour Party	October 1974
Keith Best	Anglesey	Conservative Party	1970
James Callaghan	Cardiff South and Penarth	Labour Party	1983: Cardiff South East (1950–1983); Cardiff South (1945–1950)
Alex Carlile	Montgomeryshire	Liberal Party	1983
Donald Coleman	Neath	Labour Party	1964
Denzil Davies	Llanelli	Labour Party	1970
Ron Davies	Caerphilly	Labour Party	1983
Nicholas Edwards	Pembrokeshire	Conservative Party	1970
Ioan Evans	Cynon Valley	Labour Party	1983 Aberdare (February 1974)
Michael Foot	Ebbw Vale	Labour Party	1960 by-election
Ian Grist	Cardiff Central	Conservative Party	1983 (Cardiff North 1974)
Raymond Gower	Vale of Glamorgan	Conservative Party	1983 (Barry 1951)
Robert Harvey	Clwyd South West	Conservative Party	1983
Tom Hooson	Brecon and Radnorshire	Conservative Party	1979
Geraint Howells	Ceredigion and Pembroke North	Liberal Party	February 1974
Peter Hubbard-Miles	Bridgend	Conservative Party	1983
Roy Hughes	Newport	Labour Party	1966
Brynmor John	Pontypridd	Labour Party	1970
Barry Jones	Flint East	Labour Party	1970
Gwilym Jones	Cardiff North	Conservative Party	1983
Neil Kinnock	Bedwellty	Labour Party	1970
John Marek	Wrexham	Labour Party	1983
Anthony Meyer	Clwyd North West	Conservative Party	1970
John Morris	Abervaon	Labour Party	1959
Ray Powell	Ogmore	Labour Party	1979
Keith Raffan	Delyn	Conservative Party	1983
Wyn Roberts	Conwy	Conservative Party	1970
Mark Robinson	Newport West	Conservative Party	1983
Allan Rogers	Rhondda	Labour Party	1983
Ted Rowlands	Merthyr Tydfil	Labour Party	1972 by-election
Stefan Terlezki	Cardiff West	Conservative Party	1983
Dafydd Elis-Thomas	Meirionnydd Nant Conwy	Plaid Cymru	February 1974
Roger Thomas	Carmarthen	Labour Party	1979
John Stradling Thomas	Monmouth	Conservative Party	1970
Gareth Wardell	Gower	Labour Party	1982 Gower by-election
Dafydd Wigley	Caernarfon	Plaid Cymru	February 1974
Alan Williams	Swansea West	Labour Party	1964

=== By-elections ===
- Ann Clwyd won the 1984 Cynon Valley by-election
- Richard Livsey won the 1985 Brecon and Radnor by-election

== See also ==
- Lists of MPs for constituencies in Wales
