= List of MPs for constituencies in Wales (1979–1983) =

- Colours on map indicate the party allegiance of each constituency's MP.

This is a list of members of Parliament in Wales, elected for the Forty Eighth Parliament of the United Kingdom in the 1979 general election.

== List ==
MP	Constituency	Party	In constituency since
Leo Abse	Pontypool	Labour Party	1958 by-election
Donald Anderson	Swansea East	Labour Party	October 1974
Keith Best	Anglesey	Conservative Party	1970
James Callaghan	Cardiff South East	Labour Party	1945
Alex Carlile	Montgomeryshire	Liberal Party	1983
Donald Coleman	Neath	Labour Party	1964
Denzil Davies	Llanelli	Labour Party	1970
Ifor Davies	Gower	Labour Party	1959
Nicholas Edwards	Pembrokeshire	Conservative Party	1970
Tom Ellis	Wrexham	Labour Party	1970
Ioan Evans	Aberdare	Labour Party	February 1974
Michael Foot	Ebbw Vale	Labour Party	1960 by-election
Ian Grist	Cardiff North	Conservative Party	February 1974
Raymond Gower	Barry	Conservative Party	1951
Tom Hooson	Brecon and Radnorshire	Conservative Party	1979
Geraint Howells	Ceredigion and Pembroke North	Liberal Party	February 1974
Ednyfed Hudson Davies	Caerphilly	Labour Party	1979
Roy Hughes	Newport	Labour Party	1966
Brynmor John	Pontypridd	Labour Party	1970
Alec Jones	Rhondda	Labour Party	February 1974
Barry Jones	East Flintshire	Labour Party	1970
Neil Kinnock	Bedwellty	Labour Party	1970
Anthony Meyer	West Flintshire	Conservative Party	1970
Geraint Morgan	Denbigh	Conservative Party	1959
John Morris	Abervaon	Labour Party	1959
Ray Powell	Ogmore	Labour Party	1979
Wyn Roberts	Conwy	Conservative Party	1970
Ted Rowlands	Merthyr Tydfil	Labour Party	1972 by-election
Stefan Terlezki	Cardiff West	Conservative Party	1983
George Thomas	Cardiff West	Labour Party (Speaker)	1945
Dafydd Elis-Thomas	Merioneth	Plaid Cymru	February 1974
Roger Thomas	Carmarthen	Labour Party	1979
John Stradling Thomas	Monmouth	Conservative Party	1970
Dafydd Wigley	Caernarfon	Plaid Cymru	February 1974
Alan Williams	Swansea West	Labour Party	1964

=== By-elections ===
- Gareth Wardell won the 1982 Gower by-election

== See also ==
- Lists of MPs for constituencies in Wales
