= List of MPs for constituencies in Wales (1987–1992) =

- Colours on map indicate the party allegiance of each constituency's MP.

This is a list of members of Parliament in Wales, elected for the Fiftieth Parliament of the United Kingdom in the 1987 general election.

== List ==
MP	Constituency	Party	In constituency since
Donald Anderson	Swansea East	Labour Party	October 1974
Nicholas Bennett	Pembrokeshire	Conservative Party	1987
Alex Carlile	Montgomery	Liberal Party	1983
Ann Clwyd	Cynon Valley	Labour Party	1984 by-election
Donald Coleman	Neath	Labour Party	1964
Denzil Davies	Llanelli	Labour Party	1970
Ron Davies	Caerphilly	Labour Party	1983
Paul Flynn	Newport West	Labour Party	1987
Michael Foot	Blaenau Gwent	Labour Party	1960 by-election
Win Griffiths	Bridgend	Labour Party	1987
Ian Grist	Cardiff Central	Conservative Party	1983 (Cardiff North 1974)
Raymond Gower	Vale of Glamorgan	Conservative Party	1983 (Barry 1951)
Geraint Howells	Ceredigion and Pembroke North	Liberal Party	February 1974
Roy Hughes	Newport	Labour Party	1966
Brynmor John	Pontypridd	Labour Party	1970
Barry Jones	Alyn and Deeside	Labour Party	1970
Gwilym Jones	Cardiff North	Conservative Party	1983
Martyn Jones	Clwyd South West	Labour Party	1987
Ieuan Wyn Jones	Ynys Môn	Plaid Cymru	1987
Neil Kinnock	Islwyn	Labour Party	1970
Richard Livsey	Brecon and Radnorshire	Liberal Party	1985 by-election
John Marek	Wrexham	Labour Party	1983
Anthony Meyer	Clwyd North West	Conservative Party	1970
Alun Michael	Cardiff South and Penarth	Labour Party	1987
John Morris	Abervaon	Labour Party	1959
Rhodri Morgan	Cardiff West	Labour Party	1987
Paul Murphy	Torfaen	Labour Party	1987
Ray Powell	Ogmore	Labour Party	1979
Keith Raffan	Delyn	Conservative Party	1983
Wyn Roberts	Conwy	Conservative Party	1970
Allan Rogers	Rhondda	Labour Party	1983
Ted Rowlands	Merthyr Tydfil & Rhymney	Labour Party	1972 by-election
Dafydd Elis-Thomas	Meirionnydd Nant Conwy	Plaid Cymru	February 1974
John Stradling Thomas	Monmouth	Conservative Party	1970
Gareth Wardell	Gower	Labour Party	1982 Gower by-election
Dafydd Wigley	Caernarfon	Plaid Cymru	February 1974
Alan Williams	Swansea West	Labour Party	1964
Alan Wynne Williams	Carmarthen	Labour Party	1987

=== By-elections ===
- Kim Howells won the 1989 Pontypridd by-election
- John Smith won the 1989 Vale of Glamorgan by-election
- Huw Edwards won the 1991 Monmouth by-election

== See also ==
- Lists of MPs for constituencies in Wales
