= List of MPs for constituencies in Wales (1997–2001) =

- Colours on map indicate the party allegiance of each constituency's MP.

This is a list of members of Parliament in Wales, elected for the Fifty-Second Parliament of the United Kingdom in the 1997 general election. They are arranged by party.

== Labour Party ==
- Nicholas Ainger
- Donald Anderson
- Martin Caton
- Ann Clwyd
- Denzil Davies
- Ron Davies
- Huw Edwards
- Paul Flynn
- Win Griffiths
- Peter Hain
- Dave Hanson
- Alan Howarth
- Kim Howells
- Jackie Lawrence
- Barry Jones
- Jon Owen Jones
- Martyn Jones
- Alun Michael
- Julie Morgan
- Rhodri Morgan
- Paul Murphy
- John Morris
- Ray Powell
- Allan Rogers
- Ted Rowlands
- Chris Ruane
- John Smith
- Llew Smith
- Gareth Thomas
- Don Touhig
- Alan Williams
- Betty Williams

== Liberal Democrats ==
- Richard Livsey
- Lembit Öpik

== Plaid Cymru ==
- Cynog Dafis
- Ieuan Wyn Jones
- Elfyn Llwyd
- Dafydd Wigley
- Alan Williams

== See also ==
- Lists of MPs for constituencies in Wales
