= List of MPs for constituencies in Wales (1992–1997) =

This is a list of members of Parliament in Wales, elected for the Fifty-First Parliament of the United Kingdom in the 1992 general election.

== MPs ==
- Donald Anderson
- Nick Ainger
- Alex Carlile
- Ann Clwyd
- Cynog Dafis
- Denzil Davies
- Ron Davies
- Jonathan Evans
- Roger Evans
- Paul Flynn
- Win Griffiths
- Peter Hain
- David Hanson
- Kim Howells
- Royston John Hughes
- Barry Jones
- Gwilym Jones
- Martyn David Jones
- Ieuan Wyn Jones
- Jon Owen Jones
- Neil Kinnock
- John Marek
- Elfyn Llwyd
- Alun Michael
- John Morris
- Rhodri Morgan
- Paul Murphy
- Ray Powell
- Keith Raffan
- Allan Rogers
- Rod Richards
- Wyn Roberts
- Ted Rowlands
- John Smith
- Llew Smith
- Walter Sweeney
- Don Touhig
- Gareth Wardell
- Dafydd Wigley
- Alan Williams
- Alan Wynne Williams

== See also ==
- Lists of MPs for constituencies in Wales
