= List of United Kingdom MPs: D =

Following is an incomplete list of past and present Members of Parliament (MPs) of the United Kingdom whose surnames begin with D. The dates in parentheses are the periods for which they were MPs.

- Cynog Dafis (1992–2000)
- Paul Daisley (2001–2003)
- Simon Ramsay, 16th Earl of Dalhousie (1945–1950)
- Hugh Dalton (1924–1931), (1935–1959)
- Tam Dalyell (1962–2005)
- John Danvers (1625–1639)
- George Darby (1780–1784)
- George Darby (1837–1841)
- Christopher Darby-Griffith (1857–1868)
- Alistair Darling (1987–2015)
- George Darling (1950–1974)
- Keith Darvill (1997–2001)
- Edward Davey (1997–present)
- Valerie Davey (1997–2005)
- Wayne David (2001–2024)
- Frances Davidson, Viscountess Davidson (1937–1959)
- Ian Davidson (1992–2015)
- J. C. C. Davidson, 1st Viscount Davidson (1920–1937)
- Ann Davies (2024–present)
- Chris Davies (1995–1997)
- Clement Davies (1929–1962)
- David Davies (1874–1886)
- David Davies (2005–present)
- Denzil Davies (1970–2005)
- Geraint Davies (1997–2005), (2010–present)
- Philip Davies (2005–present)
- Quentin Davies, Baron Davies of Stamford (1987–2010)
- Ron Davies (1983–2001)
- David Davis (1987–present)
- Hart Davis (1812–1818)
- Richard Hart Davis (1807–1831)
- Terry Davis (1971–1974), (1979–2004)
- William Davison, 1st Baron Broughshane (1918–1945)
- Hilton Dawson (1997–2005)
- Stephen Day (1987–2001)
- William Sidney, 1st Viscount De L'Isle (1944–1945)
- Janet Dean (1997–2010)
- Bill Deedes (1950–1974)
- Edmund Dell (1964–1979)
- John Denham (1992–2015)
- Nirj Deva (1992–1997)
- Jim Devine (2005–2010)
- Donald Dewar (1966–1970), (1978–2000)
- Parmjit Dhanda (2001–2010)
- Tanmanjeet Singh Dhesi
- John Diamond, Baron Diamond (1945–1951), (1957–1970)
- Quintin Dick (1848–1852)
- Terry Dicks (1983–1997)
- Andrew Dismore (1997–2010)
- Benjamin Disraeli (1837–1876)
- Samantha Dixon (2022–present)
- John Dixwell (1654–1659)
- Jonathan Djanogly (2001–present)
- Jim Dobbin (1997–2014)
- Alfred Dobbs (1945)
- Frank Dobson (1979–2015)
- Nigel Dodds (2001–present)
- Pat Doherty (2001–2017)
- Jeffrey Donaldson (1997–present)
- John Donne (1601, 1614)
- Patrick Donner (1931–1955)
- Brian Donohoe (1992–2015)
- Frank Doran (1987–1992), (1997–2015)
- Reginald Dorman-Smith (1935–1941)
- Stephen Dorrell (1979–2015)
- Nadine Dorries (2005–present)
- Sue Doughty (2001–2005)
- Dick Douglas (1970–1974), (1979–1992)
- Douglas Douglas-Hamilton, 14th Duke of Hamilton (1930–1940)
- James Douglas-Hamilton, Baron Selkirk of Douglas (1974–1997)
- Alec Douglas-Home (1931–1945), (1950–1951), (1963–1974)
- Den Dover (1979–1997)
- Jim Dowd (1992–2017)
- David Drew (1997–2010)
- Tom Driberg (1942–1955), (1959–1974)
- Julia Drown (1997–2005)
- Alf Dubs, Baron Dubs (1979–1987)
- Richard Du Cane (1715–1722)
- James Duddridge (2005–present)
- Patrick Duffy (1963–1966), (1970–1992)
- Thomas Dugdale, 1st Baron Crathorne (1929–1959)
- Iain Duncan Smith (1992–present)
- Andrew Rae Duncan (1940–1950)
- Peter Duncan (2001–2005)
- Lawrence Dundas, 1st Earl of Zetland (1801–1820)
- Lawrence Dundas, 1st Marquess of Zetland (1872–1873)
- Thomas Dundas, 2nd Earl of Zetland (1818–1832), (1835–1839)
- William Dundas (1801–1808), (1810–1831)
- John Dunlop (1974–1983)
- Bob Dunn (1979–1997)
- Philip Dunne (2005–present)
- Gwyneth Dunwoody (1966–1970), (1974–2008)
- John Dunwoody (1966–1970)
- Tony Durant (1974–1997)
- Mark Durkan (2005–2017)
