= List of MPs for constituencies in Scotland (1983–1987) =

- Colours on map indicate the party allegiance of each constituency's MP.

This is a list of the 72 Members of Parliament (MPs) elected to the House of Commons of the United Kingdom by Scottish constituencies for the Forty-Ninth parliament of the United Kingdom (1983 to 1987) at the 1983 general election.

== Composition ==
Affiliation	Members
Labour Party	41
Alliance	8
Scottish National Party	2
Conservative Party	21
Total	72

== List ==
Constituency	MP	Party	Notes
Aberdeen North	Robert Hughes	Labour	
Aberdeen South	Gerry Malone	Conservative	
Argyll and Bute	John Mackay	Conservative	
Ayr	George Younger	Conservative	
Banff and Buchan	Albert McQuarrie	Conservative	
Caithness and Sutherland	Robert Maclennan	Alliance (SDP)	
Carrick, Cumnock and Doon Valley	George Foulkes	Labour Co-operative	
Central Fife	Willie Hamilton	Labour	
Clackmannan	Martin O'Neill	Labour	
Clydebank and Milngavie	Hugh McCartney	Labour	
Clydesdale	Judith Hart	Labour	
Cumbernauld and Kilsyth	Norman Hogg	Labour	
Cunninghame North	John Corrie	Conservative	
Cunninghame South	David Lambie	Labour	
Dumbarton	Ian Campbell	Labour	
Dumfries	Hector Monro	Conservative	
Dundee East	Gordon Wilson	SNP	
Dundee West	Ernie Ross	Labour	
Dunfermline East	Gordon Brown	Labour	
Dunfermline West	Dick Douglas	Labour Co-operative	
East Angus	Peter Fraser	Conservative	
East Kilbride	Maurice Miller	Labour	
East Lothian	John Home Robertson	Labour	
Eastwood	Allan Stewart	Conservative	
Edinburgh Central	Alex Fletcher	Conservative	
Edinburgh East	Gavin Strang	Labour	
Edinburgh Leith	Ron Brown	Labour	
Edinburgh Pentlands	Malcolm Rifkind	Conservative	
Edinburgh South	Michael Ancram	Conservative	
Edinburgh West	James Douglas-Hamilton	Conservative	
Falkirk East	Harry Ewing	Labour	
Falkirk West	Dennis Canavan	Labour	
Galloway and Upper Nithsdale	Ian Lang	Conservative	
Glasgow Cathcart	John Maxton	Labour	
Glasgow Central	Bob Mctaggart	Labour	
Glasgow Garscadden	Donald Dewar	Labour	
Glasgow Govan	Bruce Millan	Labour	
Glasgow Hillhead	Roy Jenkins	Alliance (SDP)	
Glasgow Maryhill	Jim Craigen	Labour Co-operative	
Glasgow Pollok	James White	Labour	
Glasgow Provan	Hugh Brown	Labour	
Glasgow Rutherglen	Gregor Mackenzie	Labour	
Glasgow Shettleston	David Marshall	Labour	
Glasgow, Springburn	Michael Martin	Labour	
Gordon	Malcolm Bruce	Alliance (Liberal)	
Greenock and Port Glasgow	Norman Godman	Labour	
Hamilton	George Robertson	Labour	
Inverness, Nairn and Lochaber	Russell Johnston	Alliance (Liberal)	
Kilmarnock and Loudoun	Willie McKelvey	Labour	
Kincardine and Deeside	Alick Buchanan-Smith	Conservative	
Kirkcaldy	Harry Gourley	Labour	
Linlithgow	Sir Tam Dalyell	Labour	
Livingston	Robin Cook	Labour	
Midlothian	Alex Eadie	Labour	
Monklands East	John Smith	Labour	
Monklands West	Tom Clarke	Labour	
Moray	Alex Pollock	Conservative	
Motherwell North	Jimmy Hamilton	Labour	
Motherwell South	Jeremy Bray	Labour	
North East Fife	Barry Henderson	Conservative	
North Tayside	Bill Walker	Conservative	
Orkney and Shetland	Jim Wallace	Alliance (Liberal)	
Paisley North	Allen Adams	Labour	
Paisley South	Norman Buchan	Labour	
Perth and Kinross	Nicholas Fairbairn	Conservative	
Renfrew West and Inverclyde	Anna McCurley	Conservative	
Ross, Cromarty and Skye	Charles Kennedy	Alliance (SDP)	
Roxburgh and Berwickshire	Archy Kirkwood	Alliance (Liberal)	
Stirling	Michael Forsyth	Conservative	
Strathkelvin and Bearsden	Michael Hirst	Conservative	
Tweeddale, Ettrick and Lauderdale	David Steel	Alliance (Liberal)	
Western Isles	Donald Stewart	SNP	

== See also ==
- Lists of MPs for constituencies in Scotland
