= List of MPs for constituencies in Scotland (February 1974–October 1974) =

- Colours on map indicate the party allegiance of each constituency's MP.

This is a list of the 71 members of Parliament (MPs) elected to the House of Commons of the United Kingdom by Scottish constituencies for the Forty-sixth parliament of the United Kingdom (Feb. 1974 to Oct. 1974) at the February 1974 United Kingdom general election.

== Composition ==
Affiliation	Members
Labour Party	40
Conservative Party	21
Liberal	3
Scottish National Party	7
Total	71

== List ==
Constituency	MP	Party	Notes
Aberdeen North	Robert Hughes	Labour	
Aberdeen South	Ian Sproat	Conservative	
Argyll	Iain MacCormick	SNP	
Ayr	George Younger	Conservative	
Banffshire	Hamish Watt	SNP	
Berwick and East Lothian	Michael Ancram	Conservative	
Bothwell	James Hamilton	Labour	
Bute and North Ayrshire	John Corrie	Conservative	
Caithness and Sutherland	Robert Maclennon	Labour	
Central Ayrshire	David Lambie	Labour	
Central Dunbartonshire	Hugh McCartney	Labour	
Central Fife	Willie Hamilton	Labour	
Clackmannan and East Stirlingshire	George Reid	SNP	
Coatbridge and Airdrie	James Dempsey	Labour	
Dumfriesshire	Sir Hector Munro	Conservative	
Dundee East	Gordon Wilson	SNP	
Dundee West	Peter Doig	Labour	
Dunfermline	Adam Hunter	Labour	
East Aberdeenshire	Douglas Henderson	SNP	
East Dunbartonshire	Barry Henderson	Conservative	
East Fife	John Gilmour	Conservative	
East Kilbride	Maurice Miller	Labour	
East Renfrewshire	Betty Harvie Anderson	Conservative	
Edinburgh Central	Robin Cook	Labour	
Edinburgh East	Gavin Strang	Labour	
Edinburgh Leith	Ronald King Murray	Labour	
Edinburgh North	Alex Fletcher	Conservative	
Edinburgh Pentlands	Malcolm Rifkind	Conservative	
Edinburgh South	Michael Clark Huchison	Conservative	
Edinburgh West	Anthony Stodart, Baron Stodart of Leaston	Conservative	
Galloway	John Brewis	Conservative	
Glasgow Cathcart	Teddy Taylor	Conservative	
Glasgow Central	Thomas McMillan	Labour	
Glasgow Craigton	Bruce Millan	Labour	
Glasgow Garscadden	Willie Small	Labour	
Glasgow Govan	Harry Selby	Labour	
Glasgow Hillhead	Tom Galbraith	Conservative	
Glasgow Kelvingrove	Neil Carmichael	Labour	
Glasgow Maryhill	Jim Craigen	Labour Co-operative	
Glasgow Pollok	James White	Labour	
Glasgow Provan	Hugh Brown	Labour	
Glasgow Queen's Park	Frank McElhone	Labour	
Glasgow Shettleston	Myer Galpern	Labour	
Glasgow Springburn	Dick Buchanan	Labour	
Greenock and Port Glasgow	Dickson Mabon	Labour Co-operative	
Hamilton	Alex Wilson	Labour	
Inverness	Russell Johnston	Liberal	
Kilmarnock	William Ross	Labour	
Kinross and West Perthshire	Sir Alec Douglas-Home	Conservative	
Kirkcaldy	Harry Gourley	Labour	
Lanark	Judith Hart	Labour	
Midlothian	Alex Eadie	Labour	
Moray and Nairn	Winnie Ewing	SNP	
Motherwell and Wishaw	George Lawson	Labour	
North Angus and Mearns	Alick Buchanan-Smith	Conservative	
North Lanarkshire	John Smith	Labour	
Orkney and Zetland	Jo Grimond	Liberal	
Paisley	John Robertson	Labour	
Perth and East Perthshire	Ian MacArthur	Conservative	
Ross and Cromarty	Hamish Grey	Conservative	
Roxburgh Selkirk and Peebles	David Steel	Liberal	
Rutherglen	Gregor Mackenzie	Labour	
South Angus	Jock Bruce-Gardyne	Conservative	
South Ayrshire	Jim Sillars	Labour	
Stirling Falkirk and Grangemouth	Harry Ewing	Labour	
West Aberdeenshire	Russell Fairgrieve	Conservative	
West Dunbartonshire	Ian Campbell	Labour	
West Lothian	Tom Dalyell	Labour	
West Renfrewshire	Norman Buchan	Labour	
West Stirlingshire	William Baxter	Labour	
Na h-Eileanan an lar	Donald Stewart	SNP	

== See also ==
- Lists of MPs for constituencies in Scotland
