= List of United Kingdom MPs: R =

Following is an incomplete list of past and present Members of Parliament (MPs) of the United Kingdom whose surnames begin with R. The dates in parentheses are the periods for which they were MPs.

- Dominic Raab
- Giles Radice, Baron Radice
- William Rae
- Keith Raffan
- Henry Cecil Raikes
- Bill Rammell
- Archibald Maule Ramsay
- John Randall
- Tom Randall
- Syd Rapson
- Eleanor Rathbone
- Angela Rayner
- Nick Raynsford
- Martin Redmond
- John Redwood
- Andy Reed
- Jamie Reed
- Stanley Reed
- Steve Reed
- Christina Rees
- Merlyn Rees
- Peter Rees
- Jacob Rees-Mogg
- David Rees-Williams, 1st Baron Ogmore
- Ellie Reeves
- Joseph Reeves
- Rachel Reeves
- Alan Reid
- George Reid
- John Reid
- John Reith, 1st Baron Reith
- David Rendel
- Willie Rennie
- David Renton, Baron Renton
- Timothy Renton
- Jonathan Reynolds
- Bell Ribeiro-Addy
- Ivor Richard, Baron Richard
- Jo Richardson
- Nicholas Ridley, Baron Ridley of Liddesdale
- Malcolm Rifkind
- Linda Riordan
- Geoffrey Rippon
- Charles Ritchie, 1st Baron Ritchie of Dundee
- Andrew Robathan
- Alfred Robens, Lord Robens of Woldingham
- Angus Robertson
- George Robertson
- Hugh Robertson
- John Robertson
- John Robertson
- Laurence Robertson
- Geoffrey Robinson
- George Robinson, 1st Marquess of Ripon
- Iris Robinson
- Peter Robinson
- Barbara Roche
- Maurice Roche, 4th Baron Fermoy
- James Roche, 3rd Baron Fermoy
- William Rodgers, Baron Rodgers of Quarry Bank
- John Rodgers
- Marion Roe
- John Arthur Roebuck
- Allan Rogers
- George Rogers
- Dan Rogerson
- Jeff Rooker
- Terry Rooney
- John Bonfoy Rooper
- John Roper
- Paul Rose
- Andrew Rosindell
- Ernie Ross
- Stephen Ross, Baron Ross of Newport
- William Ross
- William Ross, Baron Ross of Marnock
- Baron Ferdinand de Rothschild
- Lionel de Rothschild
- Andrew Rowe
- Paul Rowen
- Ted Rowlands
- William Bowen Rowlands
- Frank Roy
- Chris Ruane
- Joan Ruddock
- David Ruffley
- Walter Runciman, 1st Viscount Runciman of Doxford
- Bob Russell
- Christine Russell
- Francis Russell, 2nd Earl of Bedford
- Joan Ryan
- Richard Ryder, Baron Ryder of Wensum
- Dudley Ryder, 1st Earl of Harrowby
- Robert Ryder
