= List of United Kingdom MPs: L =

Following is an incomplete list of past and present Members of Parliament (MPs) of the United Kingdom whose surnames begin with L. The dates in parentheses are the periods for which they were MPs.

- Stephen Ladyman
- Eleanor Laing
- Jacqui Lait
- Norman Lamb
- George Lambert, 1st Viscount Lambert
- George Lambert, 2nd Viscount Lambert
- Antony Lambton
- Alexander Baillie-Cochrane
- David Lammy
- Norman Lamont
- Mark Lancaster
- Ian Lang
- George Lansbury
- Andrew Lansley
- Peter Law
- Jackie Lawrence
- David Laws
- Jack Lawson
- Nigel Lawson
- Robert Laxton
- Mark Lazarowicz
- Jennie Lee
- John Leech
- Hastings Lees-Smith
- Barry Legg
- Harry Legge-Bourke
- R. C. Lehmann
- Edward Leigh
- David Lepper
- Chris Leslie
- Oliver Letwin
- Tom Levitt
- Ivan Lewis
- Julian Lewis
- Matthew Lewis
- Terence Lewis
- Helen Liddell
- Ian Liddell-Grainger
- David Lidington
- Simon Lightwood
- Peter Lilley
- Martin Linton
- Michael Livesey
- Ken Livingstone
- Richard Livsey, Baron Livsey of Talgarth
- John Llewellin, 1st Baron Llewellin
- Gwilym Lloyd George, 1st Viscount Tenby
- Megan Lloyd George
- Selwyn Lloyd
- Tony Lloyd
- Elfyn Llwyd
- David Lock
- Charles William Vane, 3rd Marquess of Londonderry
- Michael Lord
- Robert Reid, 1st Earl Loreburn
- Tim Loughton
- Andy Love
- Evan Luard (1966–1970), (1974–1979)
- Eric Lubbock, 4th Baron Avebury
- Caroline Lucas
- Henry Lucas
- Ian Lucas
- Peter Luff
- Iain Luke
- Lawrence Lumley, 11th Earl of Scarbrough
- Nicholas Lyell
- Holly Lynch
- Liz Lynne
- Alex Lyon
- John Lyons
- Alfred Lyttelton
- Oliver Lyttelton, 1st Viscount Chandos
