= List of United Kingdom MPs: N =

Following is an incomplete list of past and present Members of Parliament (or "MPs") of the United Kingdom whose surnames begin with N. The dates in parentheses are the periods for which they were MPs.

- Gerald Nabarro (1950–1964)
- Lisa Nandy (2010–present)
- Dadabhai Naoroji (1896)
- Doug Naysmith (1997–2010)
- Airey Neave (1953–1979)
- Richard Needham (1979–1983)
- Michael Neubert (1974–1997)
- Walton Newbold (1922–1923)
- Stanley Newens
- Brooks Newmark
- George Newnes (1885–1895)
- Isaac Newton (1689–1690), (1701–1702)
- Tony Newton (1974–1997)
- Patrick Nicholls
- David Nicholson
- Emma Nicholson
- Jim Nicholson
- Harold Nicolson (1935–1945)
- Nigel Nicolson (1952–1959)
- Michael Noble, Baron Glenkinglas
- Philip Noel-Baker
- Caroline Nokes
- Archie Norman
- Sir Henry Norman, 1st Baronet (1910–1923)
- Tom Normanton
- Dan Norris
- Steven Norris
- Sir Gregory Norton, 1st Baronet (1645–1652)
- John Nott
- George Nugent
- Anthony Nutting
