= List of United Kingdom MPs: T =

Following is an incomplete list of past and present Members of Parliament (MPs) of the United Kingdom whose surnames begin with t. The dates in parentheses are the periods for which they were MPs.

- Thomas Noon Talfourd (1835–1841), (1847–1849)
- Mark Tami (2001–present)
- Peter Tapsell (1959–1964), (1966–2018)
- Dick Taverne (1962–1974)
- Ann Taylor (1974–1983), (1987–2005)
- Dari Taylor (1997–2010)
- David Taylor (1997–2009)
- Herbert Taylor (1820–1823)
- Ian Taylor (1987–2010)
- John Taylor, Baron Kilclooney (1983–2001)
- John Mark Taylor (1983–2005)
- Matthew Taylor, Baron Taylor of Goss Moor (1987–2010)
- Richard Taylor (2001–2010)
- Robert Taylor (1970–1981)
- Teddy Taylor (1964–2005)
- Sarah Teather
- Norman Tebbit
- Peter Temple-Morris, Baron Temple-Morris
- James Emerson Tennent
- Margaret Thatcher (1959–1992)
- Cameron Thomas
- Gareth Thomas
- George Thomas, 1st Viscount Tonypandy (1945–1983)
- James Henry Thomas (1910–1936)
- Peter Thomas
- Simon Thomas
- Donald Thompson
- Charles Poulett Thomson, 1st Baron Sydenham
- George Thomson, Baron Thomson of Monifieth
- Emily Thornberry
- Will Thorne
- Peter Thorneycroft
- Jeremy Thorpe
- Henry Thrale
- Ernest Thurtle
- Stephen Timms
- Edward Timpson
- Paddy Tipping
- William Tite
- Mark Todd
- Jenny Tonge
- Graham Tope
- Don Touhig
- John Townend
- Cyril Townsend
- David Tredinnick
- Michael Trend
- Jon Trickett
- Neville Trotter
- Paul Truswell
- George Clement Tryon, 1st Baron Tryon
- Andrew Turner
- Dennis Turner
- Des Turner
- George Turner
- Neil Turner
- Edward Turnour, 6th Earl Winterton
- Derek Twigg
- Stephen Twigg
- Paul Tyler
- Bill Tynan
- Andrew Tyrie
