= List of United Kingdom MPs: S =

Following is an incomplete list of past and present Members of Parliament (MPs) of the United Kingdom whose surnames begin with S. The dates in parentheses are the periods for which they were MPs.

- Michael Thomas Sadler
- Timothy Sainsbury
- Shapurji Saklatvala
- Alex Salmond
- Titus Salt
- Alfred Salter
- Martin Salter (1997–2010)
- David Samuel, 3rd Viscount Samuel
- Herbert Samuel, 1st Viscount Samuel
- Adrian Sanders
- Bobby Sands
- Duncan Sandys
- Mohammad Sarwar
- Philip Sassoon
- Malcolm Savidge
- Phil Sawford
- Jonathan Sayeed
- C. P. Scott
- Lee Scott
- Edwin Scrymgeour
- Alison Seabeck (2005–present)
- Brian Sedgemore
- Charles Sedley
- Charles Seely
- Sir Charles Seely, 2nd Baronet
- Sir Charles Seely, 1st Baronet
- Andrew Selous
- David Shackleton (1902–1910)
- Edward Shackleton, Baron Shackleton
- Grant Shapps
- Richard Sharples
- Jonathan Shaw
- Hartley Shawcross
- Barry Sheerman
- Robert Sheldon
- Gillian Shephard
- Richard Shepherd
- William Shepherd
- James Sheridan
- Michael Shersby
- Baron Sherwood
- Hugh Seely, 1st Baron Sherwood
- Manny Shinwell
- Debra Shipley
- Peter Shore
- Clare Short (1983–2010)
- Edward Short, Baron Glenamara
- Edward Shortt
- Lewis Silkin, 1st Baron Silkin
- Samuel Silkin, Baron Silkin of Dulwich
- Jim Sillars
- Sydney Silverman
- Mark Simmonds
- John Simon
- Siôn Simon
- Alan Simpson
- David Simpson
- Keith Simpson
- Archibald Sinclair, 1st Viscount Thurso
- John Sinclair, 3rd Viscount Thurso
- Marsha Singh
- Trevor Skeet
- Dennis Skinner
- Andy Slaughter
- William Small
- Andrew Smith
- Angela Smith of Basildon
- Angela Smith (of South Yorkshire)
- Cyril Smith
- F. E. Smith, 1st Earl of Birkenhead
- Geraldine Smith
- Jacqui Smith
- John Smith
- John Smith
- Llew Smith
- Sir Robert Smith, 3rd Baronet
- Tim Smith
- Sir John Smyth, 1st Baronet
- Martin Smyth
- Peter Snape, Baron Snape
- Anne Snelgrove
- Harry Snell, 1st Baron Snell
- Philip Snowden, 1st Viscount Snowden
- Christopher Soames, Baron Soames
- Nicholas Soames
- Clive Soley
- Donald Bradley Somervell, Baron Somervell
- Frank Soskice
- Anna Soubry
- Peter Soulsby
- Helen Southworth
- Keith Speed
- John Spellar
- Caroline Spelman
- Michael Spicer
- Bob Spink
- Richard Spring
- Rachel Squire
- Robin Squire
- Nick St Aubyn
- Henry St John
- Norman St John-Stevas, Baron St John of Fawsley
- Edward Stanley, Lord Stanley
- John Stanley
- Oliver Stanley
- Phyllis Starkey
- David Steel
- Tom Steele
- Anthony Steen
- Gerry Steinberg
- Nicol Stephen
- George Stevenson
- David Stewart
- Donald Stewart
- Ian Stewart
- Michael Stewart
- Sir William Stirling-Maxwell, 9th Baronet
- Howard Stoate
- Richard Stokes
- John Stonehouse
- Roger Stott
- Gavin Strang
- Innes Harold Stranger
- George Smythe, 7th Viscount Strangford
- Jack Straw
- Graham Stringer
- Richard Strode
- Gisela Stuart
- Graham Stuart
- James Stuart, 1st Viscount Stuart of Findhorn
- Charles Beilby Stuart-Wortley, 1st Baron Stuart of Wortley
- Andrew Stunell
- Thomas Stuttaford
- David Sumberg
- Joseph Sunlight
- Gerry Sutcliffe
- Desmond Swayne
- John Swinburne, 7th Baronet
- John Swinney
- Jo Swinson
- Hugo Swire
- Robert Syms
