= List of United Kingdom MPs: J =

Following is an incomplete list of past and present Members of Parliament (MPs) of the United Kingdom whose surnames begin with J. The dates in parentheses are the periods for which they were MPs.

- Alister Jack
- Michael Jack
- Glenda Jackson
- Helen Jackson
- Stewart Jackson
- Robert V. Jackson
- James Berkeley, 3rd Earl of Berkeley
- Archibald James
- David James
- Henry James, 1st Baron James of Hereford
- Sian James
- David Jamieson
- Greville Janner
- Sajid Javid
- Lena Jeger
- Santo Jeger
- Bernard Jenkin
- Patrick Jenkin
- Brian Jenkins
- Toby Jessel
- Roy Jenkins
- John Coventry
- Alan Johnson
- Boris Johnson
- Diana Johnson
- Melanie Johnson
- Geoffrey Johnson-Smith
- Thomas Johnston
- Barry Jones, Baron Jones
- David Jones
- Elwyn Jones, Baron Elwyn-Jones
- Fiona Jones
- Helen Jones
- Ieuan Wyn Jones
- Jon Owen Jones
- Kevan Jones
- Lynne Jones
- Martyn Jones
- Nigel Jones
- Ruth Jones
- Michael Jopling
- Keith Joseph
- Tessa Jowell
- William Jowitt, 1st Earl Jowitt
- Eric Joyce
- William Joynson-Hicks, 1st Viscount Brentford
