= List of United Kingdom MPs: P =

Following is an incomplete list of past and present Members of Parliament (MPs) of the United Kingdom whose surnames begin with P. The dates in parentheses are the periods for which they were MPs.

- Richard Page
- Lord Clarence Paget
- James Paice
- Ian Paisley
- Nick Palmer
- John Pardoe
- Gilbert Parker
- John Parker
- John Parker
- John Parker
- John Parker
- John Parker, 1st Baron Boringdon
- Cecil Parkinson
- Charles Cripps, 1st Baron Parmoor
- Matthew Parris (1979–1986)
- Sidney James Webb, 1st Baron Passfield
- Terry Patchett
- Owen Paterson
- Irvine Patnick
- Chris Patten
- John Patten, Baron Patten
- Joseph Paxton
- Ian Pearson
- Charles Pearson, Lord Pearson
- Fred Peart, Baron Peart
- Joseph Pease (1832–1841)
- Sir Joseph Pease, 1st Baronet (1865–1903)
- Joseph Albert Pease, 1st Baron Gainford (1892–1917)
- John Peel
- Andrew Pelling
- Tom Pendry, Baron Pendry
- Isaac Penington
- Mike Penning
- John Penrose
- Samuel Pepys
- Algernon Percy, 6th Duke of Northumberland
- Eustace Percy, 1st Baron Percy of Newcastle
- Henry Percy
- Henry Percy, 7th Duke of Northumberland
- Linda Perham
- Samuel Morton Peto
- John Peyton
- Mark Philips
- Robert Needham Philips
- Marion Phillips
- Eric Pickles
- Colin Pickthall
- Peter Pike
- Phil Piratin
- Bill Pitt
- Thomas Pitt, 1st Earl of Londonderry
- James Plaskitt
- Leonard Plugge
- Kerry Pollard
- Chris Pond
- Arthur Ponsonby, 1st Baron Ponsonby of Shulbrede
- Vere Ponsonby, 9th Earl of Bessborough
- Greg Pope
- Stephen Pound
- Enoch Powell
- Ray Powell
- Bridget Prentice
- Gordon Prentice
- Reginald Prentice
- John Prescott
- Dawn Primarolo
- David Prior
- James Prior, Baron Prior
- Mark Prisk
- Mark Pritchard
- Harvey Proctor
- Gwyn Prosser
- John Pugh
- A. A. Purcell
- Ken Purchase
- James Purnell
