= List of United Kingdom MPs: V =

Following is a list of past and present Members of Parliament (MPs) of the United Kingdom whose surnames begin with V. The dates in parentheses are the periods for which they were MPs. This list is complete for MPs since 1919.

- Ed Vaizey (2005–present)
- William van Straubenzee (1959–1987)
- William Fletcher-Vane, 1st Baron Inglewood (1945–1964)
- Shailesh Vara (2005–present)
- Eric Varley (1964–1984)
- Frank Varley (1923–1929)
- David Vaughan (1929–1931)
- Gerard Folliott Vaughan (1970–1997)
- Sir Robert Vaughan, 2nd Baronet (1792–1836)
- Matthew Vaughan-Davies, 1st Baron Ystwyth (1895–1921)
- John Vaughan-Morgan, Baron Reigate (1950–1970)
- Kenyon Vaughan-Morgan
- Keith Vaz (1987–present)
- John Venn (1641–1650)
- Wilfrid Vernon (1945–1951)
- Samuel Viant (1923–1931), (1935–1959)
- Douglas Vickers (1918–1922)
- Joan Vickers, Baroness Vickers (1955–1974)
- Peter Viggers (1974–2010)
- Nicholas Aylward Vigors (1832–1840)
- Charles Pelham Villiers (1835–1898)
- Theresa Villiers (2005–present)
- Edgar Vincent, 1st Viscount D'Abernon (1899–1906)
- Rudi Vis (1997–2010)
- Henry Vivian, 1st Baron Swansea (1852–1893)
- John Henry Vivian (1832–1855)
- Dennis Vosper, Baron Runcorn (1950–1964)
