= List of United Kingdom MPs: G =

Following is an incomplete list of past and present Members of Parliament (MPs) of the United Kingdom whose surnames begin with G. The dates in parentheses are the periods for which they were MPs.

- Sam Galbraith
- Roger Gale
- Willie Gallacher
- Phil Gallie
- George Galloway
- Caroline Ganley
- Mike Gapes
- Barry Gardiner
- Tristan Garel-Jones
- Edward Garnier
- Robert Gascoyne-Cecil, 5th Marquess of Salisbury
- Robert Gascoyne-Cecil, 7th Marquess of Salisbury
- David Gauke
- Andrew George
- Bruce George
- Neil Gerrard
- Nick Gibb
- Ian Gibson
- Thomas Milner Gibson
- Sandra Gidley
- John Gilbert, Baron Gilbert
- Michelle Gildernew
- Christopher Gill
- Parmjit Singh Gill
- Cheryl Gillan
- Ian Gilmour
- Linda Gilroy
- Herbert John Gladstone, 1st Viscount Gladstone
- Norman Godman
- Roger Godsiff
- Paul Goggins
- John Golding
- Llin Golding, Baroness Golding
- Julia Goldsworthy
- Alastair Goodlad
- Helen Goodman
- Paul Goodman
- Robert Goodwill
- Patrick Gordon Walker, Baron Gordon-Walker
- Eileen Gordon
- Mildred Gordon
- Teresa Gorman
- Donald Gorrie
- John Eldon Gorst
- Bryan Gould
- Michael Gove
- Ian Gow
- Sir James Graham, 2nd Baronet
- Bernie Grant
- George Grant
- John Grant
- William Grantham (1874–1886)
- James Gray
- Chris Grayling
- Damian Green
- Matthew Green
- Justine Greening
- John Greenway
- Arthur Greenwood
- Edward Grey, 1st Viscount Grey of Fallodon
- Thomas Grey, Lord Grey of Groby
- Dominic Grieve
- Nia Griffith
- Arthur Griffith-Boscawen
- Jane Griffiths
- Jim Griffiths
- Nigel Griffiths
- Peter Griffiths
- Win Griffiths
- P.J. Grigg
- Jo Grimond
- Bruce Grocott, Baron Grocott
- John Grogan
- John Josiah Guest
- Gwendolen Guinness, Countess of Iveagh
- Walter Edward Guinness, 1st Baron Moyne
- John Gummer
- John Gunnell
- Andrew Gwynne
