= List of United Kingdom MPs: E =

Following is an incomplete list of past and present Members of Parliament (MPs) of the United Kingdom whose surnames begin with E. The dates in parentheses are the periods for which they were MPs.

- Angela Eagle (1992–present)
- Maria Eagle (1997–present)
- Sir James Buller East, 2nd Baronet
- Anthony Eden (1923–1959)
- Huw Edwards (1991–1992), (1997–2005)
- Nicholas Edwards (1970–1987)
- Clive Efford (1997–present)
- Hugh Montgomerie, 12th Earl of Eglinton (1780–1781), (1784–1789), (1796)
- John Eliot (1614–1629)
- Dafydd Elis-Thomas (1974–1992)
- John Ellison-Macartney
- Walter Elliot (1918–1923), (1924–1945), (1946–1958)
- Charles Ellis, 1st Baron Seaford
- Louise Ellman (1997–present)
- Tobias Ellwood (2005–present)
- Chris Elmore (2016–present)
- Charles Isaac Elton (1884–1885), (1886–1892)
- Peter Emery (1959–2001)
- Natascha Engel (2005–present)
- David Ennals (1964–1970), (1974–1983)
- Jeffrey Ennis (1996–2010)
- Michael English
- Derek Enright (1991–1995)
- Henry Erskine (1806–1807)
- Thomas Sotheron-Estcourt (1835–1865)
- Bill Etherington (1992–2010)
- Chris Evans (2010–present)
- Gwynfor Evans (1966–1970), (1974–1979).
- Jonathan Evans (1992–1997)
- Nigel Evans (1992–present)
- David Evennett (1983–1997), (2005–present)
- Annabelle Ewing (2001–2005)
- Margaret Ewing (1974–1979)
- Winnie Ewing (1967–1970), (1974–1979)
- Bolton Eyres-Monsell, 1st Viscount Monsell (1910–1935)
