= List of United Kingdom MPs: M =

Following is an incomplete list of past and present Members of Parliament (MPs) of the United Kingdom whose surnames begin with M. The dates in parentheses are the periods for which they were MPs.

- John McAllion
- Tommy McAvoy
- Steve McCabe
- Christine McCafferty
- Ian McCartney
- Siobhain McDonagh
- Alan Mak
- Calum MacDonald
- Malcolm MacDonald
- Ramsay MacDonald
- John McDonnell
- John MacDougall
- John McFall
- John MacGregor
- Anne McGuire
- Shona McIsaac
- Frederick Coleridge Mackarness
- Andrew MacKay
- Ann McKechin
- Rosemary McKenna
- Halford Mackinder
- Andrew Mackinlay
- John Scott Maclay, 1st Viscount Muirshiel
- David Maclean
- Donald Maclean
- Fitzroy Maclean
- Kenneth Marks
- Neil Maclean
- Henry McLeish
- Robert Maclennan, Baron Maclennan of Rogart
- Iain Macleod
- Frank McManus
- Gordon McMaster
- Maurice Macmillan
- Kevin McNamara
- Angus MacNeil
- Tony McNulty
- Denis MacShane
- Fiona Mactaggart
- Tony McWalter
- John McWilliam
- Diana Maddock
- David Madel
- Bryan Magee
- Ken Maginnis
- Frank Maguire
- Khalid Mahmood
- Alice Mahon
- Anne Main
- John Major
- Ian Malcolm
- Shahid Malik
- Humfrey Malins
- Judy Mallaber
- Seamus Mallon
- Cecil L'Estrange Malone
- John Mann
- Leah Manning
- Reginald Manningham-Buller, 1st Viscount Dilhorne
- John Maples
- John Marek
- David Margesson, 1st Viscount Margesson
- Ernest Marples
- Rob Marris
- Gordon Marsden
- Paul Marsden
- Arthur Harold Marshall (1910–1918), (1922–1923)
- David Marshall
- Jim Marshall
- Bob Marshall-Andrews
- Michael Martin
- Eric Martlew
- Glyn Mason, 2nd Baron Blackford
- Roy Mason
- Charles Masterman
- Michael Mates
- Matthew Decker
- Angus Maude
- Francis Maude
- Reginald Maudling
- Sir Thomas Mauleverer, 1st Baronet
- Brian Mawhinney
- James Maxton
- John Maxton, Baron Maxton
- David Maxwell Fyfe, 1st Earl of Kilmuir
- Robert Maxwell
- Theresa May (1997–present)
- Christopher Mayhew
- Patrick Mayhew
- Joan Maynard
- Kerry McCarthy
- Sarah McCarthy-Fry
- Robert McCartney
- William McCrea
- Alasdair McDonnell
- Pat McFadden
- Jim McGovern
- Eddie McGrady
- Martin McGuinness
- Anne McIntosh
- Reginald McKenna
- Anne McLaughlin
- Patrick McLoughlin
- Michael McNair-Wilson
- Hector McNeil
- Ronald McNeill, 1st Baron Cushendun
- Thomas McNally, Baron McNally
- Esther McVey
- Michael Meacher
- Alan Meale
- David Mellor
- Patrick Mercer
- Piers Merchant
- Gillian Merron
- Philip Metcalfe (1784–1802)
- Sir Anthony Meyer, 3rd Baronet (1964–1966), (1970–1992)
- Alun Michael (1987–2012)
- Bill Michie
- Ray Michie
- Ian Mikardo
- Alan Milburn
- Charles William Miles (1882–1885)
- John William Miles (1868)
- Philip John Miles (1820–1826), (1829–1832), (1835–1837)
- Sir Philip Miles, 2nd Baronet (1878–1885)
- Philip William Skinner Miles (1837–1852)
- Sir William Miles, 1st Baronet (1818–1820), (1830–1832), (1834–1865)
- David Miliband (2001–present)
- Ed Miliband (2005–present)
- Bruce Millan
- Andrew Miller
- Maria Miller
- Stephen Milligan
- Ernest Millington
- James Milner, 1st Baron Milner of Leeds
- Anne Milton
- Andrew Mitchell
- Austin Mitchell
- William Mitchell-Thomson, 1st Baron Selsdon
- Anne Moffat
- Laura Moffatt
- Chris Mole
- James Molyneaux
- Walter Monckton, 1st Viscount Monckton of Brenchley
- Hector Monro, Baron Monro of Langholm, (1964–1997)
- Edwin Samuel Montagu
- Samuel Montagu, 1st Baron Swaythling
- Fergus Montgomery
- Madeleine Moon
- Lewis Moonie
- John Moore, Baron Moore of Lower Marsh
- Michael Moore
- Newton Moore
- John Cuthbert Moore-Brabazon, 1st Baron Brabazon of Tara
- Margaret Moran
- Jessica Morden
- E. D. Morel
- Alasdair Morgan
- Julie Morgan
- Rhodri Morgan
- William Morice
- Elliot Morley
- John Morley, 1st Viscount Morley of Blackburn
- Charles Morris
- Estelle Morris
- John Morris
- Michael Morris, Baron Naseby
- Herbert Morrison
- William Morrison, 1st Viscount Dunrossil
- Oswald Mosley
- Malcolm Moss
- William Arthur Mount, 1st Baronet
- William George Mount
- Kali Mountford
- Mo Mowlam
- George Mudie
- H. T. Muggeridge
- Greg Mulholland
- Frederick Mulley
- Chris Mullin
- David Mundell
- Meg Munn
- Tessa Munt
- Conor Murphy
- Denis Murphy
- Jim Murphy
- Paul Murphy
- Andrew Murrison
- Ian Murray
- James Murray, 1st Baron Glenlyon
