= List of United Kingdom MPs: B =

Following is an incomplete list of past and present Members of Parliament (MPs) of the United Kingdom whose surnames begin with B. The dates in parentheses are the periods for which they were MPs.

- Alice Bacon (1945-1955), (1955-1970)
- Richard Bacon (2001–present)
- Gordon Bagier (1964-1987)
- William Bagwell (1801-1819), (1819-1826)
- Adrian Bailey (2000–2019)
- Hugh Duncan Baillie (1830-1831), (1835-1847)
- James Evan Baillie (1813-1818), (1830-1835)
- John Baillie (1820-1830), (1830-1831), (1832-1833)
- William Bain (2009–2015)
- Edward Thomas Bainbridge
- John Baird, 1st Viscount Stonehaven (1910–1925)
- Vera Baird (2001–2010)
- Edward Baker
- Kenneth Baker, Baron Baker of Dorking (1968–1997)
- Nicholas Baker (1979–1997)
- Norman Baker (1997–2015)
- Steve Baker (2010–present)
- Wilfred Baker
- Tony Baldry (1983–2015)
- Harriett Baldwin (2010–present)
- Oliver Baldwin, 2nd Earl Baldwin of Bewdley (1929–1931), (1945–1947)
- Arthur Balfour
- Jabez Balfour (1880–1885), (1889–1893)
- James Maitland Balfour (1841–1847)
- Nisbet Balfour
- Jackie Ballard (1997–2001)
- Ed Balls (2005–2015)
- Sir Frederick Banbury, 1st Baron Banbury of Southam
- Gordon Banks (2005–2015)
- Tony Banks, Baron Stratford (1983–2005)
- Steve Barclay (2010–present)
- Anthony Barber (1951–1974)
- Gregory Barker (2001–2015)
- Thomas Charles Baring
- Alfred Barnes (1880–1892)
- Alfred Barnes (1922–1931), (1935–1955)
- George Nicoll Barnes (1906–1922)
- Harry Barnes (1987–2005)
- Joel Barnett, Baron Barnett (1964–1983)
- John Baron (2001–present)
- John Barrett (2001–2010)
- Kevin Barron (1983–2019)
- Alex Barros-Curtis (2024–present)
- Percy Barstow (1941–1950)
- Vernon Bartlett (1938–1950)
- Gavin Barwell (2010–2017)
- Violet Bathurst
- John Battle (1987–2010)
- John Battley (1945–1950)
- Hugh Bayley (1992–2015)
- Robert Bean (1974–1979)
- Alan Beaney
- Nigel Beard (1997–2005)
- Jack Beattie (1943–1955)
- Henry Frederick Beaumont (1885–1892), (1865–1874)
- Hubert Beaumont (1939–1948)
- Guto Bebb (2010–2019)
- Cecil Beck (1906–1922)
- Margaret Beckett (1974–1979), (1983–present)
- Anne Begg (1997–2015)
- Roy Beggs (1983–2005)
- Alan Beith (1973–2015)
- Charles Bell (1868–1869)
- Martin Bell (1997–2001)
- Richard Bell (1900–1910)
- Stuart Bell (1983–2012)
- Torsten Bell (2024–present)
- Hilaire Belloc (1906–1910)
- David Bellotti (1990–1992)
- Henry Bellingham (1983–1997), (2001–2019)
- Sir John Benn, 1st Baronet (1892–1895), (1904–1910)
- Tony Benn (1950–1960), (1963–1983), (1984–2001)
- Hilary Benn (1999–present)
- William Wedgwood Benn, 1st Viscount Stansgate (1906–1931), (1937–1942)
- Andrew Bennett (1974–2005)
- Don Bennett (1945)
- Lord William Bentinck (1801–1803), (1812–1814), (1816–1828), (1836–1839)
- Joe Benton (1990–2015)
- Richard Benyon (2005–2019)
- John Bercow (1997–present)
- Lord Charles Beresford (1874–1880), (1885–1889), (1898–1900), (1902–1903), (1910–1916)
- Paul Beresford (1992–present)
- Luciana Berger (2010–present)
- Gerry Bermingham (1983–2001)
- Anthony Berry (1964–1984)
- Jake Berry (2010–present)
- Roger Berry (1992–2010)
- Harold Best (1997–2005)
- Clive Betts (1992–present)
- Aneurin Bevan (1929–1960)
- John Biffen (1961–1997)
- Sir Alfred Billson (1892–1907)
- Andrew Bingham (2010–present)
- Brian Binley (2005–present)
- Norman Birkett, 1st Baron Birkett (1923–1924), (1929–1931)
- Augustine Birrell (1889–1900), (1906–1918)
- Gordon Birtwistle (2010–present)
- Edward Stanley Bishop
- Mhairi Black (2015–present)
- Bob Blackman (2010–present)
- Kirsty Blackman (2015–present)
- Liz Blackman (1997–2010)
- Roberta Blackman-Woods (2005–present)
- Tony Blair (1983–2007)
- Olivia Blake (2019–present)
- Hazel Blears (1997–present)
- Bob Blizzard (1997–2010)
- David Blunkett (1987–present)
- Crispin Blunt (1997–present)
- Paul Boateng (1987–2005)
- Richard Body (1955–1959), (1966–2001)
- Margaret Bondfield (1923–1924), (1926–1931)
- Mark Bonham Carter, Baron Bonham-Carter (1958–1959)
- Betty Boothroyd (1973–2000)
- David Borrow (1997–2010)
- Tim Boswell (1987–2010)
- Arthur Bottomley (1945–1959), (1962–1983)
- Horatio Bottomley (1906–1912), (1918–1922)
- Sir Peter Bottomley (1975–present)
- Virginia Bottomley (1984–2005)
- Vansittart Bowater
- Herbert Bowden, Baron Aylestone (1945–1967)
- Thomas Gibson Bowles
- John Bowring (1835–1837), (1841–1849)
- James Boyce (1992–1994)
- Archibald Boyd-Carpenter (1918–1923), (1924–1929), (1931–1937)
- John Boyd-Carpenter, Baron Boyd-Carpenter (1945–1972)
- John Boyd Orr, 1st Baron Boyd-Orr (1945–1946)
- Rhodes Boyson (1974–1997)
- Brendan Bracken, 1st Viscount Bracken (1929–1952)
- Bessie Braddock (1945–1970)
- Charles Bradlaugh (1880–1891)
- Keith Bradley, Baron Bradley (1987–2005)
- Peter Bradley (1997–2005)
- Ben Bradshaw (1997–present)
- Graham Brady (1997–present)
- Bernard Braine (1950–1992)
- Tom Brake (1997–present)
- Ashley Bramall (1946–1950)
- Gyles Brandreth (1992–1997)
- Sir Julian Brazier (1987–2017)
- Colin Breed (1997–2010)
- Kevin Brennan (2001–present)
- Reginald Brett, 2nd Viscount Esher (1880–1885)
- William Bridgeman, 1st Viscount Bridgeman (1906–1929)
- George Bridges (1826 – 1826)
- Leon Brittan (1974–1988)
- George Broadbridge, 1st Baron Broadbridge
- Deidre Brock (2015–present)
- Fenner Brockway, Baron Brockway (1929–1931), (1950–1964)
- Annette Brooke (2001–present)
- Christopher Brooke (1924–1929)
- Henry Brooke, Baron Brooke of Cumnor (1938–1945), (1950–1966)
- Peter Brooke, Baron Brooke of Sutton Mandeville (1977–2001)
- Willie Brooke (1921–1931), (1935–1939)
- Edwin Brooks (1966–1970)
- Thomas Brooks (1942–1950), (1950–1951)
- Edward Brotherton, 1st Baron Brotherton (1902–1910), (1918–1922)
- Sir Alfred Broughton
- Henry Brougham, 1st Baron Brougham and Vaux (1810–1812), (1815–1830)
- Alan Brown (2015–present)
- Ernest Brown (1923–1924), (1927–1945)
- George Brown, Baron George-Brown (1945–1970)
- Gordon Brown (1983–present)
- Michael Brown (1979–2015)
- Nick Brown (1983–present)
- Robert Brown (1966–1987)
- Russell Brown (1997–present)
- Des Browne (1997–2010)
- Anthony Browne (Hedon constituency)
- Jeremy Browne (2005–present)
- Angela Browning (1992–2010)
- Henry Bruce, 1st Baron Aberdare (1852–1873)
- Sir Malcolm Bruce (1983–2015)
- Sir Chris Bryant (2001–present)
- James Bryce, 1st Viscount Bryce (1880–1885), (1885–1907)
- John Buchan, 1st Baron Tweedsmuir (1927–1935)
- Norman Buchan (1964–1983), (1983–1990)
- Patrick Buchan-Hepburn, 1st Baron Hailes (1931–1957)
- George Buchanan (1922–1948)
- Karen Buck (1997–present)
- Nicholas Budgen (1974–1997)
- Henry Bulwer, 1st Baron Dalling and Bulwer
- Richard Burden (1992–present)
- Thomas Burden, 1st Baron Burden (1942–1950)
- Francis Burdett (1801–1844)
- Leslie Burgin (1929–1945)
- Colin Burgon (1997–2010)
- Richard Burgon (2015–present)
- John Burnett, Baron Burnett (1997–2005)
- Dennistoun Burney (1922–1929)
- Andy Burnham (2001–2017)
- John Burns (1892–1918)
- Simon Burns (1987–2017)
- David Burnside (2001–2005)
- Paul Burstow (1997–2015)
- Alistair Burt (1983–1997), (2001–2019)
- Thomas Burt (1874–1918)
- Christine Butler (1997–2001)
- Rab Butler (1929–1965)
- John Butterfill (1983–2010)
- Sir Thomas Buxton, 1st Baronet (1818–1837)
- Stephen Byers (1992–2010)
- Liam Byrne (2004–present)
