= List of United Kingdom MPs: I =

Following is a list of past and present Members of Parliament (MPs) of the United Kingdom whose surnames begin with I. The dates in parentheses are the periods for which they were MPs. This list is complete for MPs since 1919.

- Brian Iddon (1997–2010)
- Edward Iliffe, 1st Baron Iliffe (1923–1929)
- Albert Illingworth, 1st Baron Illingworth (1915–1921)
- Eric Illsley (1987–2011)
- Sir Robert Inglis, 2nd Baronet (1824–1826), (1828–1854)
- Adam Ingram (1987–2010)
- Thomas Inskip, 1st Viscount Caldecote (1918–1929), (1931–1939)
- Tom Iremonger (1954–1974)
- Huw Irranca-Davies (2002–present)
- Arthur Irvine (1947–1978)
- Bryant Irvine (1955–1983)
- Michael Irvine (1987–1992)
- Charles Irving (1974–1992)
- Dan Irving (1918–1924)
- Sydney Irving (1955–1970), (1974–1979)
- William Irving (1945–1955)
- George Isaacs (1923–1924), (1929–1931), (1939–1959)
- Rufus Isaacs, 1st Marquess of Reading (1904–1913)
