= List of United Kingdom MPs: Z =

Following is a list of past and present Members of Parliament (MPs) of the United Kingdom whose surnames begin with Z. The dates in parentheses are the periods for which they were MPs. This list is complete for MPs since 1832.

Colour key: Conservative Labour

Name	Image	Party	First elected	Constituency	Notes
Nadhim Zahawi		Conservative	2010	Stratford-on-Avon (2010–2024)	Parliamentary Under-Secretary for COVID-19 Vaccine Deployment (2020–2021) Secretary of State for Education (2021–2022) Chancellor of the Exchequer (2022) Chancellor of the Duchy of Lancaster and Minister for Intergovernmental Relations (2022) Chairman of the Conservative Party (2022–2023)
Konni Zilliacus		Labour	1945	Gateshead (1945–1950) Manchester Gorton (1955–1967)	
Daniel Zeichner		Labour	2015	Cambridge (2015–present)	Shadow Minister of State for Food, Farming and Fisheries (2020–2024) Shadow Minister of State for Transport (2015–17)
