= List of United Kingdom MPs: K =

Following is an incomplete list of past and present Members of Parliament (MPs) of the United Kingdom whose surnames begin with K. The dates in parentheses are the periods for which they were MPs.

KA

- Mike Kane (2014–present)
- Gerald Kaufman (1970–2017)
- Arthur MacMurrough Kavanagh
- Thomas Kavanagh
- Walter MacMurrough Kavanagh
- Daniel Kawczynski (2005–present) KE
- Sir John Keane, 1st Baronet
- Maurice Keatinge
- John Hodson Kearsley
- Sally Keeble (1997–2010)
- Barbara Keeley (2005–present)
- Alan Keen (1992–2011)
- Ann Keen (1997–2010)
- Whitshed Keene
- Paul Keetch (1997–2010)
- Sir George Kekewich
- Samuel Trehawke Kekewich
- Elaine Kellett-Bowman
- Frederic Arthur Kelley (1918–1923)
- Chris Kelly (2010–2015)
- Ruth Kelly (1997–2010)
- Charles Kemeys-Tynt (1820-1837)
- Charles Kemeys-Tynt (1832–1837);(1847–1865)
- Thomas Arthur Kemmis
- Fraser Kemp (1997–2010)
- Thomas Kemp
- Thomas Read Kemp
- Liz Kendall (2010–present)
- Edmund Hegan Kennard
- Robert Kennard
- Archibald Kennedy, Earl of Cassilis
- Charles Kennedy (1983–2015)
- Jane Kennedy (1992–2010)
- Seema Kennedy (2015–present)
- Thomas Francis Kennedy
- Matthew Joseph Kenny (1882–1895)
- William Kenny (1892–1897)
- Lloyd Kenyon (1830–1832)
- William Keogh
- Augustus Keppel, 5th Earl of Albemarle
- George Keppel
- William Kenrick
- David Ker
- Richard Gervas Ker
- George Kerevan (2015–present)
- Calum Kerr (2015–present)
- Edward Kerrison
- Robert Key (1983–2010)

KH

- Piara Khabra (1992–2007)
- Sadiq Khan (2005–present)

KI

- James Kibblewhite
- David Kidney (1997–2010)
- John Kiely
- James Kilfedder
- Peter Kilfoyle (1991–2010)
- Ged Killen
- Danny Kinahan (2015–present)
- Andy King (1997–2005)
- Edward King, Viscount Kingsbrough
- Horace King (1950–1970)
- John King
- Oona King (1997–2005)
- Admiral Sir Richard King
- Robert King, 4th Earl of Kingston
- Tom King (1970–2001)
- Tess Kingham (1997–2001)
- John Alexander Kinglake
- John Kingston
- Charles Kinnaird
- Douglas Kinnaird
- William Shepherd Kinnersley
- Neil Kinnock (1970–1995)
- Stephen Kinnock (2015–present)
- Julie Kirkbride (1997–2010)
- Timothy Kirkhope (1987–1997)
- Archy Kirkwood, Baron Kirkwood of Kirkhope (1983–2005)

KN

- Roger Knapman
- George Knapp
- Edward Knatchbull-Hugessen
- Sir Edward Knatchbull, 8th Baronet
- Sir Edward Knatchbull, 9th Baronet
- Angela Knight
- Greg Knight
- Sir James Knight
- Jim Knight (2001–2010)
- Jill Knight
- Julian Knight (2015–present)
- Richard Payne Knight
- Robert Knight
- Thomas Knowles
- Sir David Knox
- George Knox
- Thomas Knox, 1st Earl of Ranfurly
- Thomas Knox, 2nd Earl of Ranfurly

KU

- Ashok Kumar (1991–1992, 1997–2010)

KW

- Kwasi Kwarteng (2010–present)

KY

- Peter Kyle (2015–present)
- Sir John Kynaston, 1st Baronet
- George Kynoch
