= List of United Kingdom MPs: U =

Following is a list of past and present Members of Parliament (MPs) of the United Kingdom whose surnames begin with U. The dates in parentheses are the periods for which they were MPs. This list is complete for MPs since 1892.

- Thomas Usborne (1892 – 1900) Conservative for Chelmsford
- Robert Uniacke-Penrose-Fitzgerald (1885–1906) Conservative for Cambridge
- Alexander Ure (1895–1913) Liberal for Linlithgowshire
- Domhnall Ua Buachalla (1918–1922) Sinn Féin for North Kildare
- Lynn Ungoed-Thomas (1945–1962)
- David Urquhart (1847–1852)
- Kitty Ussher (2005–2010)
