= List of United Kingdom MPs: F =

Following is an incomplete list of past and present Members of Parliament (MPs) of the United Kingdom whose surnames begin with F. The dates in parentheses are the periods for which they were MPs.

- David Faber (1992–2001)
- Michael Fabricant (1992–present)
- Nicholas Fairbairn (1974–1983)
- Ferdinando Fairfax, 2nd Lord Fairfax of Cameron (1640–1648)
- Michael Fallon (1997–present)
- Paul Farrelly (2001–present)
- Tim Farron (2005–present)
- Derek Fatchett (1983–1999)
- Andrew Faulds (1966–1997)
- Walter Fawkes (1806–1807)
- Ronnie Fearn, Baron Fearn (1997–2001)
- Lynne Featherstone (2005–2015)
- Sir Henry Ferguson Davie, 1st Baronet (1847–1878)
- Frank Field (1979-present)
- Mark Field (2001–present)
- Terry Fields (1983–1992)
- Robert Finlay, 1st Viscount Finlay (1916–1919)
- Geoffrey Finsberg
- Anna Firth
- Herbert Fisher
- Mark Fisher
- Gerry Fitt
- William Vesey-FitzGerald, 2nd Baron FitzGerald and Vesey
- Jim Fitzpatrick
- Lorna Fitzsimons
- Robert Flello
- Valentine Fleming
- Eric Fletcher, Baron Fletcher
- Howard Flight
- Caroline Flint
- Adrian Flook
- Paul Flynn
- Barbara Follett
- Janet Fookes
- Richard Foord
- Dingle Foot
- Isaac Foot
- Michael Foot
- Vicky Ford
- Michael Forsyth
- Clifford Forsythe
- Eric Forth
- Derek Foster
- Don Foster
- Michael Jabez Foster
- Michael John Foster
- George Foulkes, Baron Foulkes of Cumnock
- Norman Fowler
- Liam Fox
- Marcus Fox
- Hywel Francis
- Mark Francois
- Cecil Franks
- Christopher Fraser
- Sir Hugh Fraser
- John Fraser
- Peter Fraser, Baron Fraser of Carmyllie
- Sir William Fraser, 4th Baronet
- John Freeman
- Roger Freeman
- Freeman Freeman-Thomas, 1st Marquess of Willingdon
- Thomas Fremantle
- Arthur French, 1st Baron de Freyne
- Douglas French
- Clement Freud
- Maria Fyfe
