= List of United Kingdom MPs: C =

Following is an incomplete list of past and present Members of Parliament (MPs) of the United Kingdom whose surnames begin with C. The dates in parentheses are the periods for which they were MPs.

- Vince Cable (1997–present)
- Richard Caborn (1983–2010)
- David Cairns (2001–2011)
- James Callaghan (1945–1987)
- James Callaghan (1974–1997)
- Patsy Calton (2001–2005)
- David Cameron (2001–present)
- Alan Campbell (1997–present)
- Anne Campbell (1992–2005)
- Gordon Campbell, Baron Campbell of Croy (1959–1974)
- Gregory Campbell (2001–present)
- Ronnie Campbell (1987–present)
- Menzies Campbell (1987–present)
- Henry Campbell-Bannerman (1868–1908)
- Dale Campbell-Savours, Baron Campbell-Savours (1979–2001)
- Dennis Canavan (1974–2000)
- Jamie Cann (1992–2001)
- George Canning (1801–1827)
- Ivor Caplin (1997–2005)
- Alex Carlile, Baron Carlile of Berriew (1983–1997)
- Mark Carlisle (1964–1987)
- Alistair Carmichael (2001–present)
- Neil Carmichael (2010–present)
- Robert Carr (1950–1976)
- Owen Carron (1981–1983)
- Edward Carson, Baron Carson (1892–1921)
- John Cartwright (1974–1992)
- Roger Casale (1997–2005)
- Bill Cash (1984–present)
- Barbara Castle, Baroness Castle of Blackburn (1945–1979)
- Martin Caton (1997–present)
- George Cave, 1st Viscount Cave (1906–1918)
- Lord Edward Cavendish (1865–1868), (1880–1891)
- Edward Cavendish, 10th Duke of Devonshire (1923–1938)
- Spencer Cavendish, 8th Duke of Devonshire (1857–1891)
- Victor Cavendish, 9th Duke of Devonshire (1891–1908)
- Ian Cawsey (1997–2010)
- Robert Cecil, 1st Viscount Cecil of Chelwood (1906–1923)
- Colin Challen (2001–2010)
- Austen Chamberlain (1892–1937)
- Neville Chamberlain (1918–1940)
- Tankerville Chamberlayne (1892–1896), (1900–1906)
- Paul Channon, Baron Kelvedon (1959–1997)
- Henry Chaplin, 1st Viscount Chaplin (1868–1916)
- Judith Chaplin (1992–1993)
- Ben Chapman (1997–2010)
- William Chapple (1910–18) (1922–24)
- Sydney Chapman (1970–1974), (1979–2005)
- Christopher Chataway (1959–1966), (1969–1974)
- David Chaytor (1997–2010)
- David Chidgey, Baron Chidgey (1994–2005)
- Rehman Chishti (2010–Present)
- Malcolm Chisholm (1992–2001)
- Christopher Chope (1983–1992), (1997–present)
- Judith Church (1994–2001)
- Randolph Churchill (1940–1945)
- Winston Churchill (1900–1922), (1924–1964)
- Winston Churchill (1970–1997)
- James Chuter Ede (1923), (1929–1931), (1935–1964)
- Michael Clapham (1992–2010)
- James Clappison (1992–present)
- Alan Clark (1974–1992), (1997–1999)
- David Clark, Baron Clark of Windermere (1970–2001)
- Helen Clark (1997–2005)
- Lynda Clark, Baroness Clark of Calton (1997–2005)
- Paul Clark (1997–2010)
- William Clark, Baron Clark of Kempston (1959–1966), (1970–1992)
- Tony Clarke (1997–2005)
- Charles Clarke (1997–2010)
- Eric Clarke (1992–2001)
- Kenneth Clarke (1970–present)
- Tom Clarke (1982–present)
- Nick Clegg (2005–present)
- David Clelland (1985–2010)
- Geoffrey Clifton-Brown, (1945–1950)
- Geoffrey Clifton-Brown, (1992–present)
- Ann Clwyd (1984–present)
- J. R. Clynes (1906–1931), (1935–1945)
- Vernon Coaker (1997–present)
- William Cobbett (1832–1835)
- John Cockcroft (1974–1979)
- Sebastian Coe (1992–1997)
- Thomas Cochrane, 1st Baron Cochrane of Cults (1892–1910)
- Ann Coffey (1992–present)
- Harry Cohen (1983–2010)
- Iain Coleman (1997–2005)
- Tim Collins (1997–2005)
- Tony Colman (1997–2005)
- David Congdon (1992–1997)
- Michael Connarty (1992–present)
- Derek Conway (1983–1997), (2001–2010)
- Henry Peyton Cobb (1885–1895)
- Frank Cook (1983–2010)
- Robin Cook (1974–2005)
- Duff Cooper (1924–1929), (1931–1945)
- Yvette Cooper (1997–present)
- John Cope (
- Ida Copeland (1931–1935)
- Freda Corbet (1945–1974)
- Robin Corbett, Baron Corbett of Castle Vale (1974–1979), (1983–2001)
- Jeremy Corbyn (1983–present)
- Frederick Corfield
- Patrick Cormack, Baron Cormack (1970–2010)
- Jean Corston, Baroness Corston (1992–2005)
- Brian Cotter, Baron Cotter (1997–2005)
- Jim Cousins (1987–2010)
- Joseph Cowen (1874–1886)
- Jo Cox (2015–2016)
- Tom Cox (1970–2005)
- William Craig (1974–1979)
- James Cran (1987–2005)
- Ross Cranston (1997–2005)
- David Crausby (1997–present)
- Richard Crawshaw (1964–1983)
- Mary Creagh (2005–present)
- Thomas Creevey (1802–1818), (1820–1826), (1831–1832)
- Lord Ninian Crichton-Stuart (1910–1915)
- Stafford Cripps (1931–1950)
- Will Crooks (1903–1910), (1910–1921)
- Harry Crookshank, 1st Viscount Crookshank (1924–1956)
- Anthony Crosland (1950–1955), (1959–1977)
- Sir Ronald Cross, 1st Baronet (1931–1945), (1950–1951)
- Richard Crossman (1945–1974)
- Jon Cruddas (2001–present)
- Bob Cryer (1974–1983), (1987–1994)
- Ann Cryer (1997–2010)
- John Cryer (1997–2005), (2010–present)
- George Cubitt, 1st Baron Ashcombe (1860–1892)
- John Cummings (1987–2010)
- Lawrence Cunliffe (1979–2001)
- Philip Cunliffe-Lister, 1st Earl of Swinton (1918–1935)
- George Cunningham (1970–1983)
- Jim Cunningham (1992–present)
- Jack Cunningham, Baron Cunningham of Felling (1970–2005)
- Roseanna Cunningham (1995–2001)
- Tony Cunningham (2001–present)
- Edwina Currie (1983–1997)
- David Curry (1987–2010)
- Claire Curtis-Thomas (1997–2010)
- George Curzon, 1st Marquess Curzon of Kedleston (1886–1898)
