= List of United Kingdom MPs: Q =

Following is a list of past and present Members of Parliament (MPs) of the United Kingdom whose surnames begin with Q.

Name	Image	Party	First elected	Constituency	Notes
Joan Quennell		Conservative	1960	Petersfield (1960–1974)	West Sussex County Councillor (1951–61)
David Quibell		Labour	1929	Brigg (1929–1931;1935–1945)	Mayor of Scunthorpe (1953) Later ennobled as Baron Quibell
Sir Cuthbert Quilter 1st Baronet Quilter		Liberal	1885	Sudbury (1885-1886)	
Sir Cuthbert Quilter 1st Baronet Quilter		Liberal Unionist	1885	Sudbury (1886–1906)	
Sir Cuthbert Quilter 2nd Baronet Quilter		Conservative	1910	Sudbury (1910 – 1918)	
Jeremy Quin		Conservative	2015	Horsham (2015–present)	Minister for Defence Procurement (2020–present) Comptroller of the Household (2019) Lord Commissioner of the Treasury (2018–19)
Joyce Quin		Labour	1987	Gateshead East (1987–1997) Gateshead East and Washington West (1997–2005)	Minister of State for Europe (1998–99) Minister of State for Home Affairs (1997–98) MEP for Tyne and Wear (1984–89) MEP for Tyne South and Wear (1979–84) Later ennobled as Baroness Quin
Will Quince		Conservative	2015	Colchester (2015–present)	Parliamentary Under-Secretary of State for Welfare Delivery (2019–present)
Lawrie Quinn		Labour	1997	Scarborough and Whitby (1997–2005)	
Peter Quinn		Conservative	1859	Newry (1859–1865)	
Thomas Quinn		Irish Parliamentary Party	1886	Kilkenny City (1886–1890)	
Thomas Quinn		Parnellite	1886	Kilkenny City (1890–1891)	
Thomas Quinn		Irish National Federation	1886	Kilkenny City (1891–1892)	
Yasmin Qureshi		Labour	2010	Bolton South East (2010–present)	Shadow Minister for International Development (2020–present) Shadow Minister for Justice (2016–20)
