= List of United Kingdom MPs: H =

This is an incomplete list of past and present Members of Parliament (MPs) of the United Kingdom whose surnames begin with H. The dates in parentheses are the periods for which they were MPs.

- George Hadfield
- William Hague
- Peter Hain
- Louise Haigh
- John Halcomb
- Richard Burdon Haldane, 1st Viscount Haldane
- Charles Montagu, 1st Earl of Halifax
- Leslie Hale, Baron Hale
- Glenvil Hall
- Sir John Hall (1952–1978)
- John Hall (1950–1955)
- Mike Hall
- Patrick Hall
- Angus Valdemar Hambro (1910,–1922,1937,–1945)
- Archie Hamilton
- Sir David Hamilton
- Fabian Hamilton
- James Hamilton, 5th Duke of Abercorn
- Neil Hamilton
- Paulette Hamilton
- Willie Hamilton
- Philip Hammond
- Stephen Hammond
- Sir John Pakington, 1st Baron Hampton
- Matthew Hancock
- Mike Hancock
- Greg Hands
- Sir Jeremy Hanley
- Sir David Hanson
- Lewis Vernon Harcourt, 1st Viscount Harcourt
- Keir Hardie
- Harriet Harman
- Mark Harper
- Evan Harris
- Fred Harris
- John Dove Harris
- Richard Harris
- Tom Harris
- Brian Harrison
- Sir Harwood Harrison
- James Harrison
- David Hartley
- Ian Harvey
- John Harvey
- Sir Nick Harvey
- Sir George Harvie-Watt
- Alan Haselhurst
- Sir Arthur Haselrig
- Sir Patrick Hastings
- Somerville Hastings
- Edward John Littleton, 1st Baron Hatherton
- Roy Hattersley
- Sir Christopher Hatton
- Dai Havard
- Michael Havers, Baron Havers
- Thomas Hawkes (1834–1844)
- Nick Hawkins
- John Hayes
- Helene Hayman
- Helen Hayes
- Walter Hazell
- Antony Head, 1st Viscount Head
- Sylvia Heal
- Oliver Heald
- Cahir Healy
- Denis Healey
- John Healey
- David Heath
- Edward Heath
- David Heathcoat-Amory
- Derick Heathcoat-Amory, 1st Viscount Amory
- John Hemming
- Arthur Henderson
- Doug Henderson
- Douglas Henderson
- Ivan Henderson
- Mark Hendrick
- Charles Hendry
- J. W. Henley
- Stephen Hepburn
- John Heppell
- A. P. Herbert
- Sidney Herbert, 1st Baron Herbert of Lea
- Aubrey Herbert
- Nick Herbert
- Sidney Herbert, 14th Earl of Pembroke
- Margaret Herbison
- Sylvia Hermon
- Michael Heseltine
- Stephen Hesford
- Gordon Hewart, 1st Viscount Hewart
- Patricia Hewitt
- David Heyes
- William Unwin Heygate
- Benjamin Heywood
- Terence Higgins, Baron Higgins
- Archibald Hill
- Keith Hill
- Meg Hillier
- Chris Hinchliff
- David Hinchliffe
- Mark Hoban
- John Hobhouse, 1st Baron Broughton
- Margaret Hodge
- Sharon Hodgson
- Kate Hoey
- Douglas Hogg, 3rd Viscount Hailsham
- Quintin Hogg, Baron Hailsham of St Marylebone
- John Holker
- Henry Holland, 1st Viscount Knutsford
- Stuart Holland
- Philip Hollobone
- Adam Holloway
- Percy Holman
- Paul Holmes (2001–2010)
- Paul Holmes (2019–)
- John Home Robertson
- Jimmy Hood
- Geoff Hoon
- Phil Hope
- Kelvin Hopkins
- John Horam
- Leslie Hore-Belisha, 1st Baron Hore-Belisha
- Frank Hornby
- Robert Stevenson Horne, 1st Viscount Horne
- Frederick John Horniman
- Martin Horwood
- Stewart Hosie
- John Howard (1955–1964)
- Michael Howard
- Alan Howarth
- David Howarth
- George Howarth
- Gerald Howarth
- Geoffrey Howe
- David Howell
- Geraint Howells
- Kim Howells
- Lindsay Hoyle
- Robert Hudson, 1st Viscount Hudson
- Beverley Hughes
- Cledwyn Hughes
- Kevin Hughes
- Robert Hughes, Baron Hughes of Woodside
- Robert Gurth Hughes
- Simon Hughes
- Thomas Hughes
- John Hughes-Hallett
- Chris Huhne
- Joan Humble
- John Hume
- David Hunt
- George Ward Hunt
- Jeremy Hunt
- Mark Hunter
- Anthony Hurd
- Douglas Hurd
- Nick Hurd
- Patrick Hurley
- Alan Hurst
- John Hutton
- Harry Hylton-Foster
