= Cardiff North West =

UK Parliament constituency (1974–1983)

- Former borough constituency for the House of Commons

February 1974–1983
- Seats: one
- Created from: Cardiff North and Cardiff West
- Replaced by: Cardiff North

Cardiff North West was a parliamentary constituency in Cardiff, Wales. It returned one Member of Parliament (MP) to the House of Commons of the Parliament of the United Kingdom.

The constituency was created for the February 1974 general election, and abolished for the 1983 general election.

== Boundaries ==
The County Borough of Cardiff wards of Gabalfa, Llanishen, Rhiwbina, and Whitchurch.

== Members of Parliament ==
Election	Member	Party	Notes
Feb 1974	Michael Roberts	Conservative	Died February 1983
1983	constituency abolished		

== Election results ==
=== Elections in the 1970s ===
General election February 1974: Cardiff North West
Party	Candidate	Votes	%	±%
Conservative	Michael Roberts	16,654	46.74	
Labour	CA Blewett	10,641	29.86	
Liberal	H O'Brien	7,109	19.95	
Plaid Cymru	C Palfrey	1,227	3.44	
Majority		6,013	16.88	
Turnout		35,631	74.26	
Conservative win (new seat)				

General election October 1974: Cardiff North West
Party	Candidate	Votes	%	±%
Conservative	Michael Roberts	15,652	45.27	
Labour	CA Blewett	11,319	32.74	
Liberal	H O'Brien	6,322	18.29	
Plaid Cymru	C Palfrey	1,278	3.70	
Majority		4,333	12.53	
Turnout		34,571	78.95	
Conservative hold		Swing		

General election 1979: Cardiff North West
Party	Candidate	Votes	%	±%
Conservative	Michael Roberts	17,925	50.98	
Labour Co-op	Peter Owen	11,663	33.17	
Liberal	J. T. Roberts	4,832	13.74	
Plaid Cymru	C. Palfrey	743	2.11	
Majority		6,262	17.81	
Turnout		35,163	80.58	
Conservative hold		Swing		
