= Michael Roberts (politician) =

British politician (1927–1983)

Parliamentary Under-Secretary of State for Wales
- In office 5 May 1979 – 10 February 1983 Serving with Wyn Roberts

Member of Parliament for Cardiff North West
- In office 28 February 1974 – 10 February 1983
- Preceded by: Constituency established
- Succeeded by: Constituency abolished

Member of Parliament for Cardiff North
- In office 18 June 1970 – 8 February 1974
- Preceded by: Ted Rowlands
- Succeeded by: Ian Grist

Personal details
- Born: Michael Hilary Arthur Roberts; 6 May 1927 Aberystwyth, Ceredigion, Wales
- Died: 10 February 1983 (aged 55) Westminster, London, England
- Party: Conservative
- Education: University College of Wales, Cardiff
- Profession: Educator

Michael Hilary Arthur Roberts (6 May 1927 – 10 February 1983) was a British Conservative Party politician.

== Early life ==
Roberts was born in Aberystwyth, and was educated at the Neath Grammar School for Boys and the University College of Wales, Cardiff. He was the first Headteacher of the Bishop of Llandaff Church in Wales High School when it opened in 1963, and was president of the Cardiff branch of the National Union of Teachers.

== Parliamentary career ==
Roberts contested Aberdare in a 1954 by-election, placing third. He fought Cardiff South East in 1955 and 1959, being defeated both times by future Labour Prime Minister James Callaghan, on the second occasion by only 868 votes.

He was Member of Parliament for Cardiff North from 1970 to February 1974, and thereafter for Cardiff North West. He became a junior Welsh Office minister when the Margaret Thatcher government came to power in 1979.

== Death ==
At around 9:44PM on 10 February 1983, Roberts collapsed from a massive heart attack while speaking at the despatch box in the House of Commons during an adjournment debate and was pronounced dead, aged 55, on arrival at hospital. Roberts had been in poor health for two years prior to his death. Ordinarily there would have been a by-election to succeed him but none was called due to the impending 1983 general election, in which boundary changes abolished his Cardiff North West seat.

== Bibliography ==
- Times Guide to the House of Commons, 1979
- Leigh Rayment's Peerage Pages

Parliament of the United Kingdom
Preceded by Ted Rowlands	Member of Parliament for Cardiff North; 1970–Feb 1974	Succeeded by Ian Grist
New constituency	Member of Parliament for Cardiff North West; Feb 1974–1983	Constituency abolished
