= 1972 Merthyr Tydfil by-election =

UK parliamentary by-election

The 1972 Merthyr Tydfil by-election of 13 April 1972 was held after the death of S. O. Davies on 25 February the same year. The Labour Party won the by-election in what had traditionally been a safe seat, although Davies had been elected in the 1970 general election as an independent after he had been deselected due to his age.

== Result ==
1972 Merthyr Tydfil by-Election
Party	Candidate	Votes	%	±%
Labour	Edward Rowlands	15,562	48.5	+19.8
Plaid Cymru	Emrys Roberts	11,852	37.0	+27.4
Conservative	Christopher Barr	2,336	7.4	−2.4
Communist	Arthur Lewis Jones	1,519	4.7	N/A
Liberal	Angus Donaldson	765	2.4	N/A
Majority		3,710	11.5	N/A
Turnout		32,034	79.5	+1.6
Registered electors		30,202		
Labour gain from Independent		Swing		
