= Denzil Davies =

British politician (1938–2018)

The Right Honourable Denzil Davies
- Official portrait, 2001

Shadow Secretary of State for Defence
- In office 26 October 1984 – 14 June 1988
- Leader: Neil Kinnock
- Preceded by: John Silkin
- Succeeded by: Martin O'Neill

Shadow Secretary of State for Wales
- In office 20 March 1983 – 31 October 1983
- Leader: Michael Foot
- Preceded by: Alec Jones
- Succeeded by: Barry Jones

Minister of State at the Treasury
- In office 17 June 1975 – 4 May 1979
- Prime Minister: James Callaghan
- Preceded by: Robert Sheldon
- Succeeded by: Arthur Cockfield; Peter Rees

Member of Parliament for Llanelli
- In office 19 June 1970 – 11 April 2005
- Preceded by: Jim Griffiths
- Succeeded by: Nia Griffith

Personal details
- Born: David John Denzil Davies; 9 October 1938 Carmarthen
- Died: 10 October 2018 (aged 80)
- Party: Labour
- Spouse: Mary Ann Finlay (div.) Ann Carlton
- Education: Pembroke College, Oxford

David John Denzil Davies PC (9 October 1938 – 10 October 2018) was a Welsh Labour Party politician. He served for 35 years as the Member of Parliament (MP) for Llanelli from 1970 to 2005. He was a Treasury Minister (1975–1979); a member of Labour's Shadow Cabinet team (1979–1988); and a member of the Privy Council.

== Early life ==
The son of a colliery blacksmith, Denzil Davies was born and brought up in Cynwyl Elfed, in rural Carmarthenshire. From his childhood in this Welsh-speaking area, Davies spoke Welsh fluently. He attended Queen Elizabeth's Grammar School for Boys in Carmarthen, and then Pembroke College, Oxford, where he graduated with a First Class Honours BA in Law and Gray's Inn where he qualified as a barrister. He lectured in Law at the University of Chicago in 1963 and the University of Leeds from 1964. He practised at the tax bar between 1967 and 1975. Later he also practised in the field of personal injuries and served as a head of chambers.

== Parliamentary career ==
Davies unsuccessfully sought the Labour nomination for the 1966 Carmarthen by-election, losing out to Gwilym Prys-Davies.

Davies was elected in the 1970 general election as the Member of Parliament for Llanelli, following Jim Griffiths.

From June 1975 to May 1979, he was a Treasury Minister in the Labour Government first of Harold Wilson and then of James Callaghan.

A Eurosceptic, Davies campaigned against Britain's entry into the EEC.

He was a supporter of Welsh devolution in the 1979 Referendum. In 1997, he was a strong critic of the Labour Government's plans for limited devolution for Wales, challenging them as inadequate and undemocratic.

Davies served in a number of posts when Labour formed the Official Opposition after the election of Margaret Thatcher in 1979, including Shadow Secretary of State for Wales in Michael Foot's Shadow Cabinet and Shadow Secretary of State for Defence in Neil Kinnock's. He was popular among Labour MPs, and was regularly elected to the Shadow Cabinet without being part of any factional “slate” and without any organised campaign: in 1986 he reached third place in the Shadow Cabinet ballot.

Like his predecessor as Shadow Defence Secretary, John Silkin, he resigned from the front bench in June 1988 in protest at Neil Kinnock's management style. The trigger for his resignation was Kinnock's announcement, without reference to Davies or the Shadow Cabinet, of a change in Labour's defence policy, from unilateral nuclear disarmament to multilateral nuclear disarmament and then back to unilateral nuclear disarmament, over a period of three days. He made an unsuccessful bid for the Labour Party deputy leadership in 1983.

Davies was one of the few Labour MPs with ministerial experience at the time of the 1997 landslide that returned the party to power after 18 years in opposition. However, he was not included in any of the governments formed by Tony Blair. As a backbencher Davies continued to oppose Britain's membership of the EU.

In March 2003, he was one of the Labour MPs who voted against the Iraq War.

He stood down at the 2005 general election, and was succeeded by Nia Griffith. He died on 10 October 2018.

== Personal life ==
He married Mary Ann Finlay in 1963. They had a son and daughter. They divorced in 1988. He married Ann Carlton in 1989.

== Publications ==
- Booth: Residence and Domicile in U.K. Taxation (successive editions)
- Maximise Damages, Minimise Taxes (1993)
- World Trade Organisation and GATT (1994)
- The Galilean and the Goose – How Christianity converted the Roman Empire (2010 ISBN 978-0-9566489-0-7)

Parliament of the United Kingdom
Preceded by Jim Griffiths	Member of Parliament for Llanelli; 1970–2005	Succeeded by Nia Griffith
