= Ted Rowlands, Baron Rowlands =

Welsh politician (born 1940)

The Right Honourable The Lord Rowlands CBE

Member of Parliament for Merthyr Tydfil and Rhymney Merthyr Tydfil (1972–1983)
- In office 13 April 1972 – 14 May 2001
- Preceded by: S. O. Davies
- Succeeded by: Dai Havard

Member of Parliament for Cardiff North
- In office 31 March 1966 – 29 May 1970
- Preceded by: Donald Box
- Succeeded by: Michael Roberts

Member of the House of Lords
- Lord Temporal
- Life peerage 28 June 2004

Personal details
- Born: 23 January 1940 (age 86)
- Party: Labour
- Education: King's College London

Edward Rowlands, Baron Rowlands CBE (born 23 January 1940) is a Welsh politician, who served as a Labour Party Member of Parliament for over thirty years, including a period as a junior minister in the 1960s and 1970s.

== Education ==
He attended Rhondda Grammar School and Wirral Grammar School, and then King's College London, where he obtained a BA in History in 1962.

== Political career ==
Rowlands was first elected to the Commons at the 1966 general election as Member of Parliament for Cardiff North, but lost his seat at the 1970 election. He was elected to represent Merthyr Tydfil at the 1972 by-election called after the death of the long-standing MP S. O. Davies. Rowlands served as Member of Parliament for Merthyr Tydfil until the constituency boundaries were redrawn and renamed for the 1983 general election, when he was returned for the new Merthyr Tydfil and Rhymney constituency. He was returned at three further elections before he stepped down at the 2001 general election.

He had served as a junior minister in Harold Wilson's governments, as Parliamentary Under-Secretary of State in the Welsh Office from 1969 to 1970, and again from 1974 to 1975, when he was appointed to the Foreign and Commonwealth Office. From 1976, under James Callaghan's premiership, he was Minister of State at the Foreign Office until Labour was defeated at the 1979 general election.

In a debate on the Falklands War on 3 April 1982, Rowlands revealed that the British were reading Argentine diplomatic traffic. Rowlands was criticised (but not prosecuted as per parliamentary privilege) for revealing this intelligence source, as the likely result of his disclosure was that the Argentinians would secure their systems and the intelligence would dry up.

Argentine embassies used the same, top of the line, Swiss Crypto AG machine systems as their armed forces, so this was the precise equivalent of publicly announcing, during World War II, that the Allies had broken the Enigma system used by the Nazis. It is unlikely we shall ever know how much damage this betrayal of trust did to national security, but if anyone else than an MP had given the information to the Argentines they would have been prosecuted.

He was appointed a Commander of the Order of the British Empire (CBE) in the 2002 Birthday Honours, and on 28 June 2004 was created a life peer, as Baron Rowlands, of Merthyr Tydfil and of Rhymney in the County of Mid-Glamorgan.

Lord Rowlands sat on the Richard Commission which reported on 31 March 2004 on whether the National Assembly for Wales should have additional legislative powers.

Parliament of the United Kingdom
Preceded by Donald Box	Member of Parliament for Cardiff North; 1966–1970	Succeeded by Michael Roberts
Preceded by S. O. Davies	Member of Parliament for Merthyr Tydfil; 1972–1983	Constituency abolished
New constituency	Member of Parliament for Merthyr Tydfil and Rhymney; 1983–2001	Succeeded by Dai Havard
Orders of precedence in the United Kingdom
Preceded by The Lord Young of Norwood Green	Gentlemen; Baron Rowlands	Followed by The Lord Cameron of Dillington
