= List of MPs elected in the October 1974 United Kingdom general election =

October 1974–1979 Parliament of the United Kingdom
←	February–October 1974 Parliament	1979–1983 Parliament	→
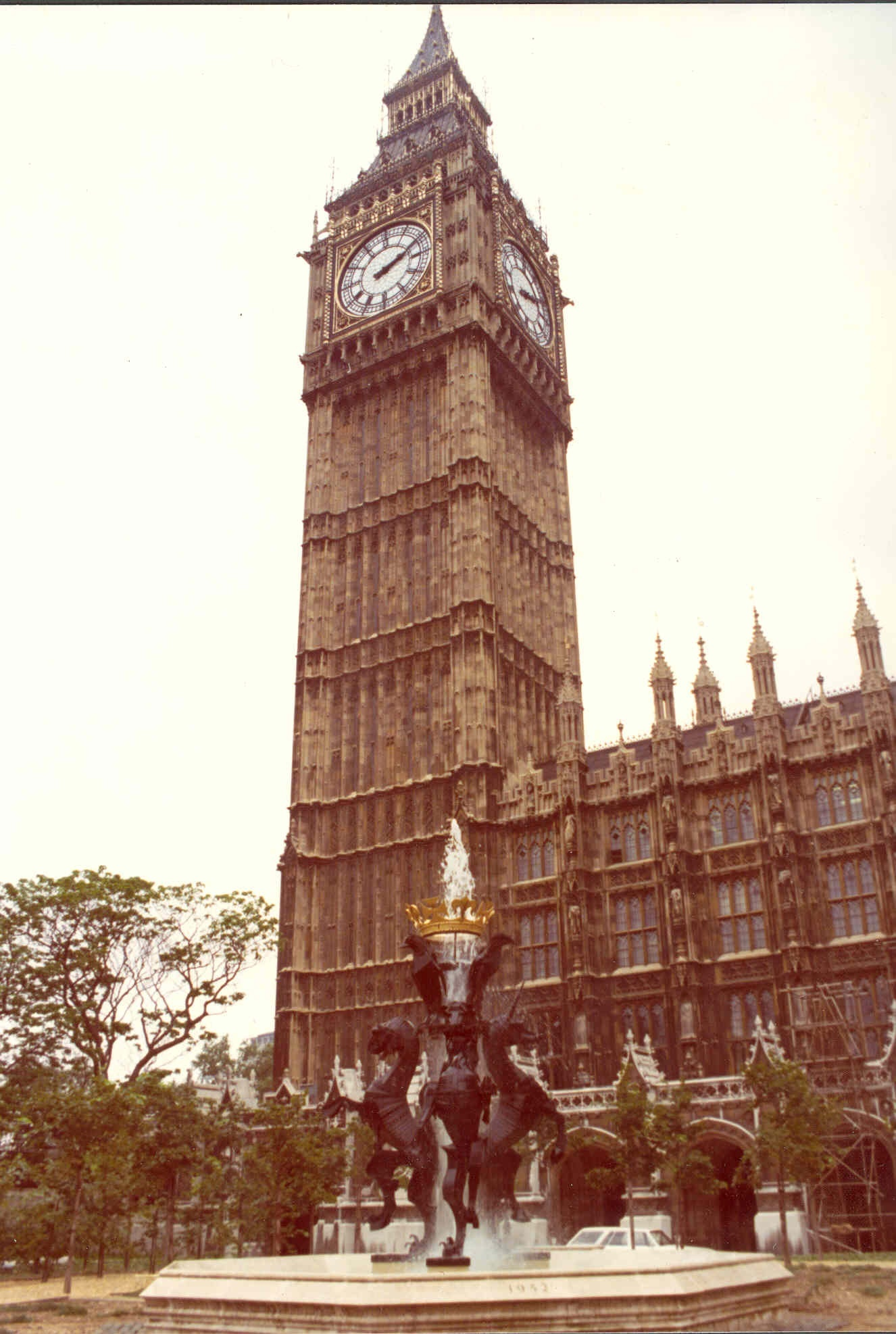
- Palace of Westminster in 1977

Overview
- Legislative body: Parliament of the United Kingdom
- Term: 10 October 1974 – 7 April 1979
- Election: October 1974 United Kingdom general election
- Government: Fourth Wilson ministry Callaghan ministry

House of Commons
- Members: 635
- Speaker: Selwyn Lloyd; George Thomas
- Leader: Michael Foot; Edward Short
- Prime Minister: Harold Wilson; James Callaghan
- Leader of the Opposition: Edward Heath; Margaret Thatcher
- Third-party leader: Jeremy Thorpe; Jo Grimond; David Steel

House of Lords
- Lord Chancellor: Baron Elwyn-Jones

Crown-in-Parliament Elizabeth II

Sessions
- 1st: 22 October 1974 – 12 November 1975
- 2nd: 19 November 1975 – 22 November 1976
- 3rd: 24 November 1976 – 26 October 1977
- 4th: 3 November 1977 – 24 October 1978
- 5th: 1 November 1978 – 4 April 1979

This is a list of members of Parliament (MPs) elected in the October 1974 general election, held on 10 October. This Parliament was dissolved in 1979.

== Composition ==
These representative diagrams show the composition of the parties in the October 1974 general election.

Note: The Scottish National Party and Plaid Cymru sit together as a party group. This is not the official seating plan of the House of Commons, which has five rows of benches on each side, with the government party to the right of the speaker and opposition parties to the left, but with room for only around two-thirds of MPs to sit at any one time.

Affiliation	Members
Labour Party	319
Conservative Party	277
Liberal Party	13
Scottish National Party	11
Ulster Unionist Party	6
Plaid Cymru	3
Vanguard Unionist Progressive Party	3
Democratic Unionist Party	1
Social Democratic and Labour Party	1
Independent Republican	1
Total	635
Notional government majority	0 (-5)
Effective government majority	2

This is a list of Members of Parliament elected to the Parliament of the United Kingdom in October 1974 general election, held on 10 October. This was the second general election to be held that year. The Parliament lasted until 1979.

Notable newcomers to the House of Commons included Margaret Jackson (later Margaret Beckett), David Penhaligon, Bryan Gould, Margaret Bain (later Margaret Ewing), Helene Hayman and Ann Taylor.

Table of contents:

A B C D E F G H I J K L M N O P Q R S T U V W X Y Z By-elections

== A ==
Constituency	MP	Party
Aberavon	John Morris	Labour
Aberdare	Ioan Evans	Labour Co-operative
Aberdeen, North	Robert Hughes	Labour
Aberdeen, South	Iain Sproat	Conservative
Aberdeenshire East	Douglas Henderson	Scottish National Party
Aberdeenshire West	Russell Fairgrieve	Conservative
Abertillery	Jeffrey Thomas	Labour
Abingdon	Airey Neave	Conservative
Accrington	Arthur Davidson	Labour
Aldershot	Julian Critchley	Conservative
Aldridge-Brownhills	Geoff Edge	Labour
Altrincham and Sale	Fergus Montgomery	Conservative
Anglesey	Cledwyn Hughes	Labour
Angus North and Mearns	Alick Buchanan-Smith	Conservative
Angus South	Andrew Welsh	Scottish National Party
Antrim, North	Rev. Ian Paisley	Democratic Unionist
Antrim, South	James Molyneaux	Ulster Unionist
Argyll	Iain MacCormick	Scottish National Party
Armagh	Harold McCusker	Ulster Unionist
Arundel	Michael Marshall	Conservative
Ashfield	David Marquand	Labour
Ashford	Keith Speed	Conservative
Ashton-under-Lyne	Robert Sheldon	Labour
Aylesbury	Timothy Raison	Conservative
Ayr	Hon. George Younger	Conservative
Ayrshire, Central	David Lambie	Labour
Ayrshire, North, and Bute	John Corrie	Conservative
Ayrshire, South	James Sillars	Labour
== B ==
Banbury	Neil Marten	Conservative
Banffshire	Hamish Watt	Scottish National Party
Barking, Barking	Josephine Richardson	Labour
Barking, Dagenham	John Parker	Labour
Barkston Ash	Michael Alison	Conservative
Barnet, Chipping Barnet	Reginald Maudling	Conservative
Barnet, Finchley	Margaret Thatcher	Conservative
Barnet, Hendon, North	John Gorst	Conservative
Barnet, Hendon, South	Peter Thomas	Conservative
Barnsley	Roy Mason	Labour
Barrow-in-Furness	Albert Booth	Labour
Barry	Sir Raymond Gower	Conservative
Basildon	Eric Moonman	Labour
Basingstoke	David Mitchell	Conservative
Bassetlaw	Joseph Ashton	Labour
Bath	Sir Edward Brown	Conservative
Batley and Morley	Sir Alfred Broughton	Labour
Beaconsfield	Ronald Bell	Conservative
Bebington and Ellesmere Port	Alfred Bates	Labour
Bedford	Trevor Skeet	Conservative
Bedfordshire, Mid	Stephen Hastings	Conservative
Bedfordshire, South	David Madel	Conservative
Bedwellty	Neil Kinnock	Labour
Beeston	James Lester	Conservative
Belfast, East	William Craig	Vanguard Progressive Unionist
Belfast, North	John Carson	Ulster Unionist
Belfast, South	Rev. Robert Bradford	Vanguard Progressive Unionist
Belfast, West	Gerard "Gerry" Fitt	Social Democratic and Labour
Belper	Roderick MacFarquhar	Labour
Berwick and East Lothian	John Mackintosh	Labour
Berwick-upon-Tweed	Alan Beith	Liberal
Bexley, Bexleyheath	Cyril Townsend	Conservative
Bexley, Erith and Crayford	James Wellbeloved	Labour
Bexley, Sidcup	Edward Heath	Conservative
Birkenhead	Edmund Dell	Labour
Birmingham Edgbaston	Jill Knight	Conservative
Birmingham Erdington	Julius Silverman	Labour
Birmingham Hall Green	Reginald Eyre	Conservative
Birmingham Handsworth	John Lee	Labour
Birmingham Ladywood	Brian Walden	Labour
Birmingham, Northfield	Raymond Carter	Labour
Birmingham Perry Barr	Jeff Rooker	Labour
Birmingham Selly Oak	Thomas Litterick	Labour
Birmingham Small Heath	Denis Howell	Labour
Birmingham Sparkbrook	Roy Hattersley	Labour
Birmingham Stechford	Roy Jenkins	Labour
Birmingham Yardley	Sydney Tierney	Labour
Bishop Auckland	James Boyden	Labour
Blaby	Nigel Lawson	Conservative
Blackburn	Barbara Castle	Labour
Blackpool, North	Norman Miscampbell	Conservative
Blackpool, South	Peter Blaker	Conservative
Blaydon	Robert Woof	Labour
Blyth	John Ryman	Labour
Bodmin	Robert Hicks	Conservative
Bolsover	Dennis Skinner	Labour
Bolton East	David Young	Labour
Bolton West	Ann Taylor	Labour
Bootle	Simon Mahon	Labour
Bosworth	Hon. Adam Butler	Conservative
Bothwell	James Hamilton	Labour
Bournemouth East	John Cordle	Conservative
Bournemouth West	Sir John Eden	Conservative
Bradford North	Benjamin Ford	Labour
Bradford South	Thomas Torney	Labour
Bradford West	Edward Lyons	Labour
Braintree	Antony Newton	Conservative
Brecon and Radnor	Caerwyn Roderick	Labour
Brent East	Reginald Freeson	Labour
Brent North	Rhodes Boyson	Conservative
Brent South	Laurence Pavitt	Labour Co-operative
Brentwood and Ongar	Robert McCrindle	Conservative
Bridgwater	Tom King	Conservative
Bridlington	Hon. Richard Wood	Conservative
Brigg and Scunthorpe	John Ellis	Labour
Brighouse and Spenborough	Colin Jackson	Labour
Brighton Kemptown	Andrew Bowden	Conservative
Brighton, Pavilion	Julian Amery	Conservative
Bristol North East	Arthur Palmer	Labour Co-operative
Bristol North West	Ronald Thomas	Labour
Bristol South	Michael Cocks	Labour
Bristol South East	Tony Benn	Labour
Bristol West	Robert Cooke	Conservative
Bromley, Beckenham	Philip Goodhart	Conservative
Bromley, Chislehurst	Roger Sims	Conservative
Bromley, Orpington	Ivor Stanbrook	Conservative
Bromley, Ravensbourne	John Hunt	Conservative
Bromsgrove and Redditch	Hal Miller	Conservative
Buckingham	William Benyon	Conservative
Burnley	Dan Jones	Labour
Burton	Ivan Lawrence	Conservative
Bury and Radcliffe	Frank White	Labour
Bury St Edmunds	Eldon Griffiths	Conservative
== C ==
Caernarfon	Dafydd Wigley	Plaid Cymru
Caerphilly	Alfred Evans	Labour
Caithness and Sutherland	Robert Maclennan	Labour
Cambridge	David Lane	Conservative
Cambridgeshire	Francis Pym	Conservative
Camden, Hampstead	Geoffrey Finsberg	Conservative
Camden, Holborn and St Pancras South	Lena Jeger	Labour
Camden, St Pancras, North	Albert Stallard	Labour
Cannock	Gwilym Roberts	Labour
Canterbury	David Crouch	Conservative
Cardiff, North	Ian Grist	Conservative
Cardiff North West	Michael Roberts	Conservative
Cardiff South East	James Callaghan	Labour
Cardiff, West	George Thomas	Labour
Cardigan	Geraint Howells	Liberal
Carlisle	Ronald Lewis	Labour
Carlton	Philip Holland	Conservative
Carmarthen	Gwynfor Evans	Plaid Cymru
Cheadle	Tom Normanton	Conservative
Chelmsford	Norman St John-Stevas	Conservative
Cheltenham	Charles Irving	Conservative
Chertsey and Walton	Geoffrey Pattie	Conservative
Chesham and Amersham	Ian Gilmour	Conservative
Chester, City of	Hon. Peter Morrison	Conservative
Chesterfield	Eric Varley	Labour
Chester-le-Street	Giles Radice	Labour
Chichester	Anthony Nelson	Conservative
Chippenham	Daniel Awdry	Conservative
Chorley	George Rodgers	Labour
Christchurch and Lymington	Robert Adley	Conservative
Cirencester and Tewkesbury	Hon. Nicholas Ridley	Conservative
City of London and Westminster South	Christopher Tugendhat	Conservative
City of Westminster, Paddington	Arthur Latham	Labour
City of Westminster, St Marylebone	Kenneth Baker	Conservative
Cleveland and Whitby	Leon Brittan	Conservative
Clitheroe	David Walder	Conservative
Coatbridge and Airdrie	James Dempsey	Labour
Colchester	Antony Buck	Conservative
Colne Valley	Richard Wainwright	Liberal
Consett	David Watkins	Labour
Conway	Wyn Roberts	Conservative
Cornwall, North	John Pardoe	Liberal
Coventry North East	George Park	Labour
Coventry North West	Maurice Edelman	Labour
Coventry South East	William Wilson	Labour
Coventry South West	Audrey Wise	Labour
Crewe	Gwyneth Dunwoody	Labour
Crosby	Graham Page	Conservative
Croydon, Central	John Moore	Conservative
Croydon North East	Bernard Weatherill	Conservative
Croydon North West	Robert Taylor	Conservative
Croydon, South	William Clark	Conservative
== D ==
Darlington	Edward Fletcher	Labour
Dartford	Sydney Irving	Labour Co-operative
Darwen	Charles Fletcher-Cooke	Conservative
Daventry	Arthur Jones	Conservative
Dearne Valley	Edwin Wainwright	Labour
Denbigh	Geraint Morgan	Conservative
Derby North	Phillip Whitehead	Labour
Derby South	Walter Johnson	Labour
Derbyshire, North East	Thomas Swain	Labour
Derbyshire, South East	Peter Rost	Conservative
Derbyshire, West	James Scott-Hopkins	Conservative
Devizes	Hon. Charles Morrison	Conservative
Devon, North	Jeremy Thorpe	Liberal
Devon, West	Peter Mills	Conservative
Dewsbury	David Ginsburg	Labour
Doncaster	Harold Walker	Labour
Don Valley	Richard Kelley	Labour
Dorking	Sir George Sinclair	Conservative
Dorset, North	David James	Conservative
Dorset, South	Evelyn King	Conservative
Dorset, West	James Spicer	Conservative
Dover and Deal	Peter Rees	Conservative
Down, North	James Kilfedder	Ulster Unionist
Down, South	Enoch Powell	Ulster Unionist
Dudley East	John Gilbert	Labour
Dudley West	Colin Phipps	Labour
Dumfries	Hector Monro	Conservative
Dunbartonshire, Central	Hugh McCartney	Labour
Dunbartonshire, East	Margaret Bain	Scottish National Party
Dunbartonshire, West	Ian Campbell	Labour
Dundee, East	Gordon Wilson	Scottish National Party
Dundee, West	Peter Doig	Labour
Dunfermline	Adam Hunter	Labour
Durham	Mark Hughes	Labour
Durham, North West	Ernest Armstrong	Labour
== E ==
Ealing, Acton	Sir George Young, 6th Baronet	Conservative
Ealing North	William Molloy	Labour
Ealing, Southall	Sydney Bidwell	Labour
Easington	Jack Dormand	Labour
Eastbourne	Ian Gow	Conservative
East Grinstead	Geoffrey Johnson Smith	Conservative
East Kilbride	Maurice Miller	Labour
Eastleigh	David Price	Conservative
Ebbw Vale	Michael Foot	Labour
Eccles	Lewis Carter-Jones	Labour
Edinburgh Central	Robin Cook	Labour
Edinburgh East	Gavin Strang	Labour
Edinburgh Leith	Ronald King Murray	Labour
Edinburgh North	Alex Fletcher	Conservative
Edinburgh Pentlands	Malcolm Rifkind	Conservative
Edinburgh South	Michael Hutchison	Conservative
Edinburgh West	Lord James Douglas-Hamilton	Conservative
Enfield, Edmonton	Edward Graham	Labour Co-operative
Enfield North	Bryan Davies	Labour
Enfield, Southgate	Hon. Anthony Berry	Conservative
Epping Forest	John Biggs-Davison	Conservative
Epsom & Ewell	Sir Peter Rawlinson	Conservative
Esher	Carol Mather	Conservative
Essex, South East	Sir Bernard Braine	Conservative
Eton and Slough	Joan Lestor	Labour
Exeter	John Hannam	Conservative
Eye	Sir Harwood Harrison	Conservative
== F ==
Falmouth and Camborne	David Mudd	Conservative
Fareham	Reginald Bennett	Conservative
Farnham	Maurice Macmillan	Conservative
Farnworth	John Roper	Labour Co-operative
Faversham	Roger Moate	Conservative
Fermanagh & South Tyrone	Frank Maguire	Independent Republican
Fife, Central	Willie Hamilton	Labour
Fife, East	Sir John E. Gilmour, Bt.	Conservative
Flint, East	Barry Jones	Labour Co-operative
Flint, West	Sir Anthony Meyer	Conservative
Folkestone and Hythe	Albert Costain	Conservative
== G ==
Gainsborough	Marcus Kimball	Conservative
Galloway	George Thompson	Scottish National Party
Gateshead, East	Bernard Conlan	Labour
Gateshead West	John Horam	Labour
Gillingham	Frederick Burden	Conservative
Glasgow, Cathcart	Edward Taylor	Conservative
Glasgow, Central	Thomas McMillan	Labour
Glasgow Craigton	Bruce Millan	Labour
Glasgow Garscadden	William Small	Labour
Glasgow, Govan	Harry Selby	Labour
Glasgow Hillhead	Thomas Galbraith	Conservative
Glasgow Kelvingrove	Neil Carmichael	Labour
Glasgow, Maryhill	James Craigen	Labour Co-operative
Glasgow Pollok	James White	Labour
Glasgow, Provan	Hugh Brown	Labour
Glasgow, Queen's Park	Frank McElhone	Labour
Glasgow, Shettleston	Sir Myer Galpern	Labour
Glasgow, Springburn	Richard Buchanan	Labour
Gloucester	Sally Oppenheim	Conservative
Gloucestershire, South	John Cope	Conservative
Gloucestershire, West	John Watkinson	Labour
Goole	Edmund Marshall	Labour
Gosport	Peter Viggers	Conservative
Gower	Ifor Davies	Labour
Grantham	Joseph Godber	Conservative
Gravesend	John Ovenden	Labour
Greenock and Port Glasgow	Dickson Mabon	Labour Co-operative
Greenwich, Greenwich	Guy Barnett	Labour
Greenwich, Woolwich, East	John Cartwright	Labour
Greenwich, Woolwich, West	William Hamling	Labour
Grimsby	Anthony Crosland	Labour
Guildford	David Howell	Conservative
== H ==
Hackney, Central	Stanley Clinton-Davis	Labour
Hackney North and Stoke Newington	David Weitzman	Labour
Hackney South and Shoreditch	Ronald Brown	Labour
Halesowen and Stourbridge	John Stokes	Conservative
Halifax	Shirley Summerskill	Labour
Haltemprice	Patrick Wall	Conservative
Hamilton	Alexander Wilson	Labour
Hammersmith, Fulham	Michael Stewart	Labour
Hammersmith, North	Frank Tomney	Labour
Harborough	John Farr	Conservative
Haringey, Hornsey	Hugh Rossi	Conservative
Haringey, Tottenham	Norman Atkinson	Labour
Haringey, Wood Green	Joyce Butler	Labour Co-operative
Harlow	Stanley Newens	Labour Co-operative
Harrogate	Robert Banks	Conservative
Harrow Central	Anthony Grant	Conservative
Harrow East	Hugh Dykes	Conservative
Harrow West	John Page	Conservative
Hartlepool	Edward Leadbitter	Labour
Harwich	Julian Ridsdale	Conservative
Hastings	Kenneth Warren	Conservative
Havant and Waterloo	Ian Lloyd	Conservative
Havering, Hornchurch	Alan Lee Williams	Labour
Havering, Romford	Michael Neubert	Conservative
Havering, Upminster	John Loveridge	Conservative
Hazel Grove	Tom Arnold	Conservative
Hemel Hempstead	Robin Corbett	Labour
Hemsworth	Alec Woodall	Labour
Henley	Michael Heseltine	Conservative
Hereford	Colin Shepherd	Conservative
Hertford and Stevenage	Shirley Williams	Labour
Hertfordshire, East	Sir Derek Walker-Smith	Conservative
Hertfordshire, South	Cecil Parkinson	Conservative
Hertfordshire, South West	Geoffrey Dodsworth	Conservative
Hexham	Geoffrey Rippon	Conservative
Heywood and Royton	Joel Barnett	Labour
High Peak	Spencer Le Marchant	Conservative
Hillingdon, Hayes and Harlington	Neville Sandelson	Labour
Hillingdon, Ruislip-Northwood	Petre Crowder	Conservative
Hillingdon, Uxbridge	Michael Shersby	Conservative
Hitchin	Ian Stewart	Conservative
Holland with Boston	Richard Body	Conservative
Honiton	Peter Emery	Conservative
Horncastle	Peter Tapsell	Conservative
Horsham and Crawley	Peter Hordern	Conservative
Houghton-le-Spring	Thomas Urwin	Labour
Hounslow, Brentford and Isleworth	Barney Hayhoe	Conservative
Hounslow, Feltham and Heston	Russell Kerr	Labour
Hove	Hon. Tim Sainsbury	Conservative
Howden	Sir Paul Bryan	Conservative
Huddersfield East	Joseph Mallalieu	Labour
Huddersfield West	Kenneth Lomas	Labour
Huntingdonshire	Sir David Renton	Conservative
Huyton	Harold Wilson	Labour
== I ==
Ilkeston	Raymond Fletcher	Labour
Ince	Michael McGuire	Labour
Inverness	Russell Johnston	Liberal
Ipswich	Kenneth Weetch	Labour
Isle of Ely	Clement Freud	Liberal
Isle of Wight	Stephen Ross	Liberal
Islington Central	John Grant	Labour
Islington North	Michael O'Halloran	Labour
Islington South and Finsbury	George Cunningham	Labour
== J ==
Jarrow	Ernest Fernyhough	Labour
== K ==
Keighley	Robert Cryer	Labour
Kensington and Chelsea, Chelsea	Nicholas Scott	Conservative
Kensington and Chelsea, Kensington	Sir Brandon Rhys-Williams	Conservative
Kettering	Sir Geoffrey de Freitas	Labour
Kidderminster	Esmond Bulmer	Conservative
Kilmarnock	William Ross	Labour
Kingston upon Hull Central	Kevin McNamara	Labour
Kingston upon Hull East	John Prescott	Labour
Kingston upon Hull West	James Johnson	Labour
Kingston-upon-Thames	Norman Lamont	Conservative
Kingswood	Terence Walker	Labour
Kinross and West Perthshire	Nicholas Fairbairn	Conservative
Kirkcaldy	Harry Gourlay	Labour
Knutsford	John Davies	Conservative
== L ==
Lambeth, Central	Marcus Lipton	Labour
Lambeth, Norwood	John Fraser	Labour
Lambeth, Streatham	William Shelton	Conservative
Lambeth, Vauxhall	George Strauss	Labour
Lanark	Judith Hart	Labour
Lanarkshire, North	John Smith	Labour
Lancaster	Elaine Kellett-Bowman	Conservative
Leeds East	Denis Healey	Labour
Leeds North East	Sir Keith Joseph	Conservative
Leeds North West	Sir Donald Kaberry	Conservative
Leeds South	Merlyn Rees	Labour
Leeds South East	Stanley Cohen	Labour
Leeds West	Joseph Dean	Labour
Leek	David Knox	Conservative
Leicester East	Tom Bradley	Labour
Leicester South	Jim Marshall	Labour
Leicester West	Greville Janner	Labour
Leigh	Harold Boardman	Labour
Leominster	Peter Temple-Morris	Conservative
Lewes	Tim Rathbone	Conservative
Lewisham Deptford	Hon. John Silkin	Labour
Lewisham, East	Roland Moyle	Labour
Lewisham, West	Christopher Price	Labour
Lichfield and Tamworth	Bruce Grocott	Labour
Lincoln	Margaret Jackson	Labour
Liverpool Edge Hill	Sir Arthur Irvine	Labour
Liverpool, Garston	Edward Loyden	Labour
Liverpool Kirkdale	James Dunn	Labour
Liverpool Scotland Exchange	Robert Parry	Labour
Liverpool Toxteth	Richard Crawshaw	Labour
Liverpool Walton	Eric Heffer	Labour
Liverpool Wavertree	Anthony Steen	Conservative
Liverpool West Derby	Eric Ogden	Labour
Llanelli	Denzil Davies	Labour
Londonderry	William Ross	Ulster Unionist
Loughborough	John Desmond Cronin	Labour
Louth	Lt.-Cmdr. Michael Brotherton	Conservative
Lowestoft	Jim Prior	Conservative
Ludlow	Jasper More	Conservative
Luton, East	Ivor Clemitson	Labour
Luton West	Brian Sedgemore	Labour
== M ==
Macclesfield	Nicholas Winterton	Conservative
Maidstone	John Wells	Conservative
Maldon	John Wakeham	Conservative
Manchester Ardwick	Gerald Kaufman	Labour
Manchester Blackley	Paul Rose	Labour
Manchester, Central	Harold Lever	Labour
Manchester, Gorton	Kenneth Marks	Labour
Manchester Moss Side	Frank Hatton	Labour
Manchester, Openshaw	Charles Morris	Labour
Manchester Withington	Frederick Silvester	Conservative
Manchester Wythenshawe	Alfred Morris	Labour Co-operative
Mansfield	Don Concannon	Labour
Melton	Michael Latham	Conservative
Meriden	John Tomlinson	Labour
Merioneth	Dafydd Thomas	Plaid Cymru
Merthyr Tydfil	Edward Rowlands	Labour
Mitcham and Morden	Bruce Douglas-Mann	Labour
Merton, Wimbledon	Sir Michael Havers	Conservative
Middleton and Prestwich	James Callaghan	Labour
Midlothian	Alexander Eadie	Labour
Monmouth	John Stradling Thomas	Conservative
Montgomeryshire	Emlyn Hooson	Liberal
Moray and Nairn	Winifred Ewing	Scottish National Party
Morecambe and Lonsdale	Alfred Hall-Davis	Conservative
Morpeth	George Grant	Labour
Motherwell and Wishaw	Jeremy Bray	Labour
== N ==
Nantwich	John Cockcroft	Conservative
Neath	Donald Coleman	Labour
Nelson and Colne	Doug Hoyle	Labour
Newark	Edward Stanley Bishop	Labour
Newbury	Michael McNair-Wilson	Conservative
Newcastle-under-Lyme	John Golding	Labour
Newcastle upon Tyne Central	Edward Short	Labour
Newcastle upon Tyne East	Michael Thomas	Labour Co-operative
Newcastle upon Tyne North	Sir William Elliott	Conservative
Newcastle upon Tyne West	Robert Brown	Labour
New Forest	Patrick McNair-Wilson	Conservative
Newham North East	Reg Prentice	Labour
Newham North West	Arthur Lewis	Labour
Newham South	Nigel Spearing	Labour
Newport	Roy Hughes	Labour
Newton	John Evans	Labour
Norfolk North	Ralph Howell	Conservative
North West Norfolk	Christopher Brocklebank-Fowler	Conservative
Norfolk, South	John MacGregor	Conservative
Norfolk, South West	Paul Hawkins	Conservative
Normanton	Albert Roberts	Labour
Northampton North	Maureen Colquhoun	Labour
Northampton South	Michael Morris	Conservative
North Fylde	Walter Clegg	Conservative
Northwich	Alastair Goodlad	Conservative
Norwich North	David Ennals	Labour
Norwich South	John Garrett	Labour
Nottingham East	Jack Dunnett	Labour
Nottingham North	William Whitlock	Labour
Nottingham, West	Michael English	Labour
Nuneaton	Leslie Huckfield	Labour
== O ==
Ogmore	Walter Padley	Labour
Oldham East	James Lamond	Labour
Oldham, West	Michael Meacher	Labour
Orkney and Shetland	Jo Grimond	Liberal
Ormskirk	Robert Kilroy-Silk	Labour
Oswestry	John Biffen	Conservative
Oxford	Evan Luard	Labour
Oxfordshire, Mid	Hon. Douglas Hurd	Conservative
== P ==
Paisley	John Robertson	Labour
Pembrokeshire	Nicholas Edwards	Conservative
Penistone	John Mendelson	Labour
Penrith and The Border	William Whitelaw	Conservative
Perth and East Perthshire	Douglas Crawford	Scottish National Party
Peterborough	Michael Ward	Labour
Petersfield	Lt.-Col. Michael Mates	Conservative
Plymouth, Devonport	David Owen	Labour
Plymouth Drake	Janet Fookes	Conservative
Plymouth Sutton	Alan Clark	Conservative
Pontefract and Castleford	Joseph Harper	Labour
Pontypool	Leo Abse	Labour
Pontypridd	Brynmor John	Labour
Poole	Oscar Murton	Conservative
Portsmouth North	Frank Judd	Labour
Portsmouth South	Bonner Pink	Conservative
Preston, North	Ronald Atkins	Labour
Preston, South	Stanley Thorne	Labour
Pudsey	Giles Shaw	Conservative
== R ==
Reading North	Anthony Durant	Conservative
Reading South	Gerard Vaughan	Conservative
Redbridge, Ilford, North	Millie Miller	Labour
Redbridge, Ilford, South	Arnold Shaw	Labour
Redbridge, Wanstead and Woodford	Patrick Jenkin	Conservative
Reigate	George Gardiner	Conservative
Renfrewshire, East	Betty Harvie Anderson	Conservative
Renfrewshire, West	Norman Buchan	Labour
Rhondda	Alec Jones	Labour
Richmond upon Thames, Richmond	Sir Anthony Royle	Conservative
Richmond upon Thames, Twickenham	Toby Jessel	Conservative
Richmond (Yorkshire)	Sir Timothy Kitson	Conservative
Ripon	Keith Hampson	Conservative
Rochdale	Cyril Smith	Liberal
Rochester and Chatham	Robert Bean	Labour
Ross and Cromarty	Hamish Gray	Conservative
Rossendale	Michael Noble	Labour
Rotherham	Brian O'Malley	Labour
Rother Valley	Peter Hardy	Labour
Roxburgh, Selkirk and Peebles	David Steel	Liberal
Royal Tunbridge Wells	Patrick Mayhew	Conservative
Rugby	William Price	Labour
Runcorn	Mark Carlisle	Conservative
Rushcliffe	Kenneth Clarke	Conservative
Rutherglen	Gregor Mackenzie	Labour
Rutland and Stamford	Kenneth Lewis	Conservative
Rye	Godman Irvine	Conservative
== S ==
Saffron Walden	Peter Kirk	Conservative
St Albans	Victor Goodhew	Conservative
St Helens	Leslie Spriggs	Labour
St Ives	John Nott	Conservative
Salford East	Frank Allaun	Labour
Salford West	Stan Orme	Labour
Salisbury	Michael Hamilton	Conservative
Scarborough	Michael Shaw	Conservative
Sevenoaks	Sir John Rodgers	Conservative
Sheffield Attercliffe	Patrick Duffy	Labour
Sheffield Brightside	Joan Maynard	Labour
Sheffield, Hallam	John Osborn	Conservative
Sheffield Heeley	Frank Hooley	Labour
Sheffield Hillsborough	Martin Flannery	Labour
Sheffield, Park	Frederick Mulley	Labour
Shipley	Marcus Fox	Conservative
Shoreham	Richard Luce	Conservative
Shrewsbury	Sir John Langford-Holt	Conservative
Skipton	Burnaby Drayson	Conservative
Solihull	Percy Grieve	Conservative
Somerset, North	Paul Dean	Conservative
Southampton Itchen	Bob Mitchell	Labour
Southampton Test	Bryan Gould	Labour
Southend, East	Sir Stephen McAdden	Conservative
Southend, West	Paul Channon	Conservative
South Fylde	Edward Gardner	Conservative
Southport	Ian Percival	Conservative
South Shields	Arthur Blenkinsop	Labour
Southwark, Bermondsey	Robert Mellish	Labour
Southwark, Dulwich	Hon. Samuel Silkin	Labour
Southwark, Peckham	Harry Lamborn	Labour
Sowerby	Max Madden	Labour
Spelthorne	Humphrey Atkins	Conservative
Stafford and Stone	Hon. Hugh Fraser	Conservative
Staffordshire, South West	Patrick Cormack	Conservative
Stalybridge and Hyde	Tom Pendry	Labour
Stirling, Falkirk and Grangemouth	Harry Ewing	Labour
Stirlingshire, East and Clackmannan	George Reid	Scottish National Party
Stirlingshire, West	Dennis Canavan	Labour
Stockport, North	Andrew Bennett	Labour
Stockport, South	Maurice Orbach	Labour
Stoke-on-Trent Central	Robert Cant	Labour
Stoke-on-Trent North	John Forrester	Labour
Stoke-on-Trent South	Jack Ashley	Labour
Stratford-on-Avon	Angus Maude	Conservative
Stretford	Winston Churchill	Conservative
Stroud	Anthony Kershaw	Conservative
Sudbury and Woodbridge	Keith Stainton	Conservative
Sunderland, North	Frederick Willey	Labour
Sunderland, South	Gordon Bagier	Labour
Surbiton	Sir Nigel Fisher	Conservative
Surrey, East	Sir Geoffrey Howe	Conservative
Surrey, North West	Michael Grylls	Conservative
Sussex, Mid	Tim Renton	Conservative
Sutton, Carshalton	Robert Carr	Conservative
Sutton, Sutton and Cheam	Neil Macfarlane	Conservative
Sutton Coldfield	Norman Fowler	Conservative
Swansea, East	Donald Anderson	Labour
Swansea, West	Alan Williams	Labour
Swindon	David Stoddart	Labour
== T ==
Taunton	Edward du Cann	Conservative
Teesside, Middlesbrough	Arthur Bottomley	Labour
Teesside, Redcar	James Tinn	Labour
Teesside, Stockton	William Rodgers	Labour
Teesside, Thornaby	Ian Wrigglesworth	Labour Co-operative
Thanet, East	Jonathan Aitken	Conservative
Thanet, West	William Rees-Davies	Conservative
Thirsk and Malton	John Spence	Conservative
Thurrock	Hugh Delargy	Labour
Tiverton	Robin Maxwell-Hyslop	Conservative
Tonbridge and Malling	John Stanley	Conservative
Torbay	Sir Frederic Bennett	Conservative
Totnes	Ray Mawby	Conservative
Tower Hamlets, Bethnal Green and Bow	Ian Mikardo	Labour
Tower Hamlets, Stepney and Poplar	Peter Shore	Labour
Truro	David Penhaligon	Liberal
Tynemouth	Neville Trotter	Conservative
== U ==
Ulster, Mid	John Dunlop	Vanguard Progressive Unionist
== W ==
Wakefield	Walter Harrison	Labour
Wallasey	Lynda Chalker	Conservative
Wallsend	Ted Garrett	Labour
Walsall North	John Stonehouse	Labour Co-operative
Walsall South	Bruce George	Labour
Waltham Forest, Chingford	Norman Tebbit	Conservative
Waltham Forest, Leyton	Bryan Magee	Labour
Waltham Forest, Walthamstow	Eric Deakins	Labour
Wandsworth, Battersea, North	Douglas Jay	Labour
Wandsworth, Battersea, South	Ernest Perry	Labour
Wandsworth, Putney	Hugh Jenkins	Labour
Wandsworth, Tooting	Tom Cox	Labour
Warley East	Andrew Faulds	Labour
Warley West	Peter Archer	Labour
Warrington	Thomas Williams	Labour Co-operative
Warwick and Leamington	Dudley Smith	Conservative
Watford	Raphael Tuck	Labour
Wellingborough	Peter Fry	Conservative
Wells	Hon. Robert Boscawen	Conservative
Welwyn and Hatfield	Helene Hayman	Labour
West Bromwich East	Peter Snape	Labour
West Bromwich West	Betty Boothroyd	Labour
Westbury	Dennis Walters	Conservative
Western Isles	Donald Stewart	Scottish National Party
Westhoughton	Roger Stott	Labour
West Lothian	Tam Dalyell	Labour
Westmorland	Michael Jopling	Conservative
Weston-super-Mare	Jerry Wiggin	Conservative
Whitehaven	John Cunningham	Labour
Widnes	Gordon Oakes	Labour
Wigan	Alan Fitch	Labour
Winchester	Rear-Adm. Morgan Morgan-Giles	Conservative
Windsor and Maidenhead	Alan Glyn	Conservative
Wirral	Selwyn Lloyd	None - Speaker
Woking	Cranley Onslow	Conservative
Wokingham	William van Straubenzee	Conservative
Wolverhampton North East	Renee Short	Labour
Wolverhampton South East	Robert Edwards	Labour Co-operative
Wolverhampton South West	Nicholas Budgen	Conservative
Worcester	Peter Walker	Conservative
South Worcestershire	Michael Spicer	Conservative
Workington	Fred Peart	Labour
Worthing	Terence Higgins	Conservative
Wrekin, The	Gerald Fowler	Labour
Wrexham	Tom Ellis	Labour
Wycombe	Sir John Hall	Conservative
== Y ==
Yarmouth	Anthony Fell	Conservative
Yeovil	John Peyton	Conservative
York	Alexander Lyon	Labour

== By-elections ==
See the list of United Kingdom by-elections.

Four seats were vacant when Parliament was dissolved preparatory to the 1979 general election:

- Abingdon – Airey Neave (Con)
- Batley and Morley – Alfred Broughton (Lab)
- Chipping Barnet – Reginald Maudling (Con)
- North East Derbyshire – Thomas Swain (Lab)

In addition, Maurice Orbach (Labour MP for Stockport South) died on 24 April, after dissolution but before the general election.

== Defections ==
- 14 April 1976: John Stonehouse (Walsall North) defects from Labour to English National Party
- 26 July 1976: James Sillars (Ayrshire South) and John Robertson (Paisley) resign from Labour Party and sit as Scottish Labour
- 1977–1978: The Vanguard Progressive Unionist Party fell apart. William Craig (East Belfast) and Robert Bradford (South Belfast) joined the Ulster Unionist Party. John Dunlop joined the United Ulster Unionist Party.
- 1977: James Kilfedder (North Down) left the Ulster Unionist Party and sat as an independent unionist.

== Progression of government majority and party totals ==
The government voting total is the total number of Labour MPs, minus the Labour Deputy Speakers (two until 3 Feb 1976, one from that date). The opposition voting total is the total number of other MPs, minus the Speaker and the Conservative Deputy Speakers (one until 3 Feb 1976, two from that date). The majority is the difference between the former and the latter.

The Conservatives began with 276 MPs; the figure of 277 given above includes the Speaker Selwyn Lloyd.

In the Majority column, figures in brackets denote the majority the Lib-Lab pact had during its time of operation.

Date	Event	Govt majority	Labour	Con	Lib	SNP	UUP	Plaid	Vang	SDLP	DUP	UUUP	ENP	SLP	Indep.	Spkr	Vacant
29 October 1974	Opening of Parliament	3	319	276	13	11	6	3	3	1	1	0	0	0	1	1	0
20 March 1975	Hamling (Lab, Woolwich W) dies	2	318	276	13	11	6	3	3	1	1	0	0	0	1	1	1
26 June 1975	Bottomley wins Woolwich W by-election for Cons	1	318	277	13	11	6	3	3	1	1	0	0	0	1	1	0
11 October 1975	Dunlop defects from Vanguard to UUUP	1	318	277	13	11	6	3	2	1	1	1	0	0	1	1	0
19 November 1975	Bradford defects from Vanguard to UUP	1	318	277	13	11	7	3	1	1	1	1	0	0	1	1	0
27 November 1975	Kilfedder defects from UUP, becomes Ind Unionist	1	318	277	13	11	6	3	1	1	1	1	0	0	2	1	0
14 December 1975	Edelman (Lab, Coventry NW) dies	0	317	277	13	11	6	3	1	1	1	1	0	0	2	1	1
15 January 1976	Carr (Con, Carshalton) elevated to Lords	1	317	276	13	11	6	3	1	1	1	1	0	0	2	1	2
3 February 1976	Thomas (Lab) becomes Spkr. Lloyd (Spk) resigns	2	316	276	13	11	6	3	1	1	1	1	0	0	2	1	3
4 March 1976	Robinson wins Coventry NW by-election for Lab	3	317	276	13	11	6	3	1	1	1	1	0	0	2	1	2
11 March 1976	Conservatives win Carshalton & Wirral by-elections	1	317	278	13	11	6	3	1	1	1	1	0	0	2	1	0
6 April 1976	O'Malley (Lab, Rotherham) dies	0	316	278	13	11	6	3	1	1	1	1	0	0	2	1	1
7 April 1976	Stonehouse resigns from Labour	-2	315	278	13	11	6	3	1	1	1	1	0	0	3	1	1
14 April 1976	Stonehouse joins English National Party	-2	315	278	13	11	6	3	1	1	1	1	1	0	2	1	1
4 May 1976	Delargy (Lab, Thurrock) dies	-3	314	278	13	11	6	3	1	1	1	1	1	0	2	1	2
24 June 1976	Crowther wins Rotherham by-election for Lab	-2	315	278	13	11	6	3	1	1	1	1	1	0	2	1	1
15 July 1976	McDonald wins Thurrock by-election for Lab	-1	316	278	13	11	6	3	1	1	1	1	1	0	2	1	0
26 July 1976	Sillars & Robertson leave Labour for Scot Lab	-5	314	278	13	11	6	3	1	1	1	1	1	2	2	1	0
27 August 1976	Stonehouse (Eng Nat, Walsall N) resigns seat	-4	314	278	13	11	6	3	1	1	1	1	0	2	2	1	1
23 September 1976	Peart (Lab, Workington) elevated to Lords	-5	313	278	13	11	6	3	1	1	1	1	0	2	2	1	2
12 October 1976	Lane (Con, Cambridge) resigns seat	-4	313	277	13	11	6	3	1	1	1	1	0	2	2	1	3
21 October 1976	Short (Lab, Newcastle C) resigns seat	-5	312	277	13	11	6	3	1	1	1	1	0	2	2	1	4
4 November 1976	Cons win 2 by-elections, Lab win 1 (Newcastle C)	-6	313	279	13	11	6	3	1	1	1	1	0	2	2	1	1
2 December 1976	Rhodes James (Con) wins Cambridge by-election	-7	313	280	13	11	6	3	1	1	1	1	0	2	2	1	0
5 January 1977	Tugendhat (C), Marquand & Jenkins (Lab) resign	-8	311	279	13	11	6	3	1	1	1	1	0	2	2	1	3
19 February 1977	Crosland (Lab, Great Grimsby) dies	-9	310	279	13	11	6	3	1	1	1	1	0	2	2	1	4
24 February 1977	Brooke (Con) wins London & Wminster by-elect	-10	310	280	13	11	6	3	1	1	1	1	0	2	2	1	3
31 March 1977	MacKay (Con) wins Birmingham Stechford b-e	-11 (15)	310	281	13	11	6	3	1	1	1	1	0	2	2	1	2
16 April 1977	Kirk (Con, Saffron Walden) dies	-10 (16)	310	280	13	11	6	3	1	1	1	1	0	2	2	1	3
28 April 1977	Cons win Ashfield, Lab win Grimsby by-elections	-10 (16)	311	281	13	11	6	3	1	1	1	1	0	2	2	1	1
16 June 1977	Walden (Lab, Birm Ladywood) resigns seat	-11 (15)	310	281	13	11	6	3	1	1	1	1	0	2	2	1	2
7 July 1977	Haselhurst wins Saffron Walden by-el for Cons	-12 (14)	310	282	13	11	6	3	1	1	1	1	0	2	2	1	1
25 July 1977	Cordle (Con, Bournemouth E) resigns seat	-11 (15)	310	281	13	11	6	3	1	1	1	1	0	2	2	1	2
18 August 1977	Sever wins Birm Ladywood by-election for Lab	-10 (16)	311	281	13	11	6	3	1	1	1	1	0	2	2	1	1
8 October 1977	Prentice defects from Labour to Conservatives	-12 (14)	310	282	13	11	6	3	1	1	1	1	0	2	2	1	1
29 October 1977	Miller (Lab, Ilford N) dies	-13 (13)	309	282	13	11	6	3	1	1	1	1	0	2	2	1	2
24 November 1977	Atkinson wins Bournemouth E by-el for Cons	-14 (12)	309	283	13	11	6	3	1	1	1	1	0	2	2	1	1
26 November 1977	Craig defects from Vanguard to UUP	-14 (12)	309	283	13	11	7	3	0	1	1	1	0	2	2	1	1
18 January 1978	Small (Lab, Glasgow Garscadden) dies	-15 (11)	308	283	13	11	7	3	0	1	1	1	0	2	2	1	2
19 January 1978	Hall (Con, Wycombe) dies	-14 (12)	308	282	13	11	7	3	0	1	1	1	0	2	2	1	3
22 February 1978	Lipton (Lab, Lambeth C) dies	-15 (11)	307	282	13	11	7	3	0	1	1	1	0	2	2	1	4
2 March 1978	Bendall wins Ilford N by-election for Cons	-16 (10)	307	283	13	11	7	3	0	1	1	1	0	2	2	1	3
23 March 1978	Wilson (Lab, Hamilton) dies	-17 (9)	306	283	13	11	7	3	0	1	1	1	0	2	2	1	4
6 April 1978	Rawlinson (Con, Epsom & Ewell) resigns seat	-16 (10)	306	282	13	11	7	3	0	1	1	1	0	2	2	1	5
13 April 1978	Dewar wins Glasgow Gars by-election for Lab	-15 (11)	307	282	13	11	7	3	0	1	1	1	0	2	2	1	4
20 April 1978	Tilley wins Lambeth C by-election for Lab	-14 (12)	308	282	13	11	7	3	0	1	1	1	0	2	2	1	3
27 April 1978	Conservatives win Wycombe, Epsom by-elections	-16 (10)	308	284	13	11	7	3	0	1	1	1	0	2	2	1	1
16 May 1978	Hatton (Lab, Manchester Moss Side) dies	-17 (9)	307	284	13	11	7	3	0	1	1	1	0	2	2	1	2
20 May 1978	Mendelson (Lab, Penistone) dies	-18 (8)	306	284	13	11	7	3	0	1	1	1	0	2	2	1	3
31 May 1978	Robertson wins Hamilton by-election for Lab	-17 (9)	307	284	13	11	7	3	0	1	1	1	0	2	2	1	2
24 June 1978	Harper (Lab, Pontefract & Castleford) dies	-18 (8)	306	284	13	11	7	3	0	1	1	1	0	2	2	1	3
13 July 1978	Labour wins Penistone, Moss Side by-elections	-16 (10)	308	284	13	11	7	3	0	1	1	1	0	2	2	1	1
30 July 1978	Mackintosh (Lab, Berwick & E Lothian) dies	-17 (9)	307	284	13	11	7	3	0	1	1	1	0	2	2	1	2
26 October 1978	Labour wins 2 by-elections; Walder (Con) dies	-14	309	283	13	11	7	3	0	1	1	1	0	2	2	1	1
6 November 1978	Davies (Con, Knutsford) resigns seat	-13	309	282	13	11	7	3	0	1	1	1	0	2	2	1	2
15 December 1978	Irvine (Lab, Liverpool Edge Hill) dies	-14	308	282	13	11	7	3	0	1	1	1	0	2	2	1	3
14 February 1979	Maudling (Con, Chipping Barnet) dies	-13	308	281	13	11	7	3	0	1	1	1	0	2	2	1	4
1 March 1979	Conservatives win Clitheroe & Knutsford by-els	-15	308	283	13	11	7	3	0	1	1	1	0	2	2	1	2
2 March 1979	Swain (Lab, NE Derbyshire) dies	-16	307	283	13	11	7	3	0	1	1	1	0	2	2	1	3
29 March 1979	Alton wins Edge Hill by-election for Liberals	-17	307	283	14	11	7	3	0	1	1	1	0	2	2	1	2
30 March 1979	Neave (Con, Abingdon) dies	-16	307	282	14	11	7	3	0	1	1	1	0	2	2	1	3
2 April 1979	Broughton (Lab, Batley & Morley) dies	-17	306	282	14	11	7	3	0	1	1	1	0	2	2	1	4
