= Hamilton by-election =

Hamilton by-election may refer to:

== Australia ==
- 1934 Hamilton state by-election, NSW Assembly, following the death of Hugh Connell

== New Zealand Parliament ==
- 1959 Hamilton by-election, following the death of Hilda Ross
- 2022 Hamilton West by-election, following the resignation of Gaurav Sharma

== Scottish Parliament ==
- 2025 Hamilton, Larkhall and Stonehouse by-election, following the death of Christina McKelvie

== UK Parliament ==
- 1943 Hamilton by-election, following the death of Duncan Graham
- 1945 Hamilton by-election, following the death of Frank Findlay
- 1967 Hamilton by-election, following the resignation of Tom Fraser
- 1978 Hamilton by-election, following the death of Alex Wilson
- 1999 Hamilton South by-election following the appointment of George Robertson as Nato Secretary-General
- 2023 Rutherglen and Hamilton West by-election, following the recall of Margaret Ferrier
