= Tom Fraser =

Scottish coal miner and trade unionist

The Right Honourable Tom Fraser

Minister of Transport
- In office 16 October 1964 – 23 December 1965
- Monarch: Elizabeth II
- Prime Minister: Harold Wilson
- Preceded by: Ernest Marples
- Succeeded by: Barbara Castle

Under-Secretary of State for Scotland
- In office 4 August 1945 – 26 October 1951; Served with George Buchanan, John Robertson and Margaret Herbison.
- Monarch: George VI
- Prime Minister: Clement Attlee
- Sec. of State: Joseph Westwood

Chairman of the North of Scotland Hydro-Electric Board
- In office May 1967 – January 1979
- Preceded by: The Lord Strathclyde
- Succeeded by: The Lord Greenhill of Harrow

Member of Parliament for Hamilton
- In office 29 January 1943 – 14 October 1967
- Preceded by: Duncan Macgregor Graham
- Succeeded by: Winnie Ewing

Personal details
- Born: 18 February 1911
- Died: 21 November 1988 (aged 77)
- Party: Labour

Thomas Fraser PC (18 February 1911 – 21 November 1988) was a Scottish coal miner and trade unionist, who was a Labour Member of Parliament (MP) for the Hamilton constituency between 1943 and 1967.

== Life ==
He was the son of Thomas and Mary Fraser of Kirkmuirhill, Lanarkshire. He was educated at Lesmahagow Higher Grade School until the age of 14, when he began work as a miner, working underground until his entry to parliament. The economist Sir Alec Cairncross, also a pupil at the school, remembered Fraser as "rather shy, quiet spoken, friendly and unassertive ... not a very conspicuous member of the class, nor one who ever showed the gifts one associates with a political career".

Fraser served as a branch official for his union from 1938 until 1943 and, from 1939 until 1943, was secretary of the Lanark divisional Labour Party. He entered parliament at the 1943 Hamilton by-election, defeating an independent candidate by over 8,000 votes and polling 81.1% of the votes cast. Following the Labour Party's victory in the 1945 general election, he was appointed as Joint Under-Secretary of State for Scotland and held the post until his party lost power in 1951 general election.

In opposition, Fraser served as Shadow Secretary of State for Scotland "for many years". Following Labour's victory in the 1964 general election he served as Minister of Transport from 16 October 1964 until 23 December 1965. In December 1965 he introduced the 70 mph (113 km/h) speed limit on motorways as an emergency measure, following a series of multiple low-speed crashes on motorways, mainly in fog. During his tenure as minister, he authorised the closure 1,071 miles (1,724 km) of railway lines, following the recommendations from the Beeching reports, including lines, notably the Oxford to Cambridge Line, that Beeching had not considered closing. On the other hand, he also rejected closure proposals for such lines as the West Highland Line between Fort William and Mallaig.

In May 1967, he resigned from Parliament to become chairman of the North of Scotland Hydro-Electric Board. His resignation caused a by-election, which resulted in a historic victory for the Scottish National Party candidate, Winnie Ewing.

He was made a Privy Counsellor in 1964. He later served on the Wheatley Commission and was in part responsible for the resulting reforms in Scottish local government. He retired to Lesmahagow, where he had previously been employed as a miner, and died in Law Hospital in 1988 after a brief illness. When he died, one of his successors for the seat, George Robertson, noted there was still "immense respect" for him in Hamilton.

== Family ==
In 1935, Fraser married Janet Scanlon of Lesmahagow. They had a son and a daughter.

== Notes ==
Parliament of the United Kingdom
Preceded by Duncan Macgregor Graham	Member of Parliament for Hamilton; 1943–1967	Succeeded by Winnie Ewing
Political offices
Preceded by Ernest Marples	Minister of Transport; 1964–1965	Succeeded by Barbara Castle
