= 1967 Hamilton by-election =

UK by-election

- 2 November 1967

Hamilton parliamentary seat
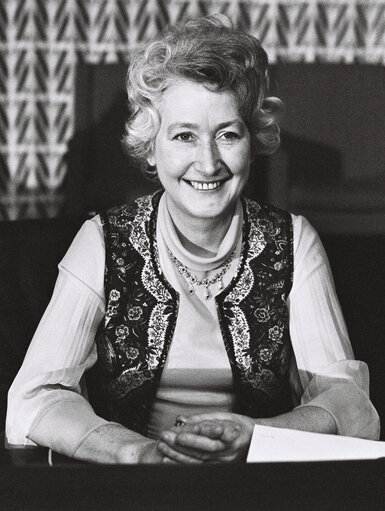
	First party	Second party	Third party
Candidate	Winnie Ewing	Alexander Wilson	Ian Dyer
Party	SNP	Labour	Conservative
Popular vote	18,397	16,598	4,986
Percentage	46.0%	41.5%	12.5%
Swing	▲46.0%	▼29.7%	▼16.4%
MP before election
Tom Fraser
Labour
Subsequent MP
Winnie Ewing
SNP

The 1967 Hamilton by-election in Hamilton, Lanarkshire, Scotland, was held on 2 November 1967. It was called after the former Labour MP, Tom Fraser, resigned in order to take up the position as head of the North of Scotland Hydro-Electric Board. The constituency had been a safe seat for Labour, who had taken over two-thirds of the vote there in every general election from 1945 to 1966, when only the Conservatives had stood against them.

The election saw a surprise victory for the Scottish National Party candidate Winnie Ewing. The SNP took 46% of the vote in a constituency which they had not even contested at the 1966 general election held the previous year, and gained the seat from the Labour Party with a swing of nearly 38%. Ewing did not retain the seat at the following general election, but the SNP have been continuously represented in the House of Commons ever since.

== Background ==
Prior to this by-election, the SNP had been a peripheral movement in Scottish politics. They had taken only 5% of the vote across Scotland in 1966, having stood candidates in 23 out of 71 seats. In the 1950s, they had never stood more than five candidates or taken more than 1% of the Scottish vote in general elections. However, Hamilton was not the first Westminster seat to be won by the SNP; the party had won a short-lived victory at the 1945 Motherwell by-election. In the years before Ewing's victory, there had been other breakthroughs by nationalist parties in Britain – including Gwynfor Evans' similarly groundbreaking victory for Plaid Cymru at the 1966 Carmarthen by-election, a big advance for the SNP at the 1967 Glasgow Pollok by-election, and SNP gains in local elections, including becoming the largest party in local government in Stirling.

On the day of the election it was reported that Labour were strong favourites to win the seat with bookmakers, who made them 10 to 1 on to win the seat, and that Labour candidate Alex Wilson had indicated the previous day that he was more confident than ever of victory.

== Result ==
1967 Hamilton by-election
Party	Candidate	Votes	%	±%
SNP	Winnie Ewing	18,397	46.01	New
Labour	Alexander Wilson	16,598	41.51	−29.66
Conservative	Ian Dyer	4,986	12.47	−16.36
Majority		1,799	4.50	N/A
Turnout		39,981		
SNP gain from Labour		Swing	+37.9	

== Aftermath and legacy ==
The SNP's leadership merely told Ewing to: "try to come a good second in order to encourage the members". "As ever," Ewing later wrote, "I overdid it, and as a result my life changed for ever." After her victory was declared, Ewing famously said to the crowd outside "Stop the World, Scotland wants to get on."

Historian Tom Devine describes the 1967 Hamilton by-election as "the most sensational by-election result in Scotland since 1945" and Isobel Lindsay called it a "watershed" moment in Scottish political history. Gerry Hassan similarly describes it as being a pivotal moment in Scottish politics.

In 2007, on the 40th anniversary of Ewing's victory, the then SNP leader Alex Salmond said: "That by-election was undoubtedly a catalyst for reform, without which the movement for a Scottish Parliament would have been delayed still further. It forced the pace of change and demanded attention for the cause of Scottish independence from Westminster."

The seat would swing back to Labour at the 1970 general election, with Alexander Wilson again the party's candidate, defeating Ewing by 9,000 votes. Ewing would return to Westminster at the February 1974 election, winning the seat of Moray and Nairn from Conservative MP Gordon Campbell, and she'd retain the seat at the October 1974 general election, but would be defeated in 1979. From 1979 to 1999, she served as a Member of the European Parliament for Highlands and Islands, the only ever MEP for that constituency as it was abolished in 1999. In 1999 she was elected to the inaugural Scottish Parliament, serving 1999 to 2003 as one of seven regional list Members of the Scottish Parliament for the Highlands and Islands regional constituency. She served as president of the Scottish National Party from 1987 to 2005.

== See also ==
- Royal Commission on the Constitution (United Kingdom)
- Elections in Scotland
- List of United Kingdom by-elections
