= Peter Meldrum =

Sir Peter Lowrie Meldrum (6 March 1910 – 31 October 1965) was a Scottish politician who served as Lord Provost of Glasgow.

Meldrum became a trade union official, and in 1939 was elected to Glasgow City Council, representing Fairfield ward for the Labour Party. He became a business owner, but remained an active councillor. By the late 1940s, he was the convener of the council's planning committee, in which role he allocated sites for new industrial estates.

Meldrum was the secretary of the Labour group on the council from 1941 until 1958, for the last three years also serving as City Treasurer. In 1958, he instead became the chair of the Labour group, and in 1963 he was elected as Lord Provost of Glasgow. As provost, he led a successful campaign to relocate the Post Office Savings Bank to the city.

Meldrum died whilst still in office on 31 October 1965, at the age of 55.

Civic offices
Preceded by Jean Roberts	Lord Provost of Glasgow; 1963–1965	Succeeded by John Johnston
