= Jean Roberts (politician) =

Scottish politician

- Born: 20 December 1895; Springburn, Glasgow
- Died: 26 March 1988 (aged 92)
- Education: Dundas Vale Teacher Training College
- Occupations: Politician, Lord Provost of Glasgow
- Known for: First female Lord Provost of Glasgow
- Political party: Independent Labour Party
- Honours: Dame Commander of the Order of the British Empire, granted by Queen Elizabeth II in 1961

Dame Jean Barr MacDonald Roberts, DBE (née Weir; 1895 – 1988) was a Scottish politician who served as Lord Provost of Glasgow from 1960 to 1962, the first ever female Lord Provost. She was awarded Dame Commander of the Order of the British Empire by Queen Elizabeth II. She was a member of the Independent Labour Party.

== Life ==
Jean Roberts was born at 36 Avenue Road in Springburn,Glasgow on 20 December 1895 the daughter of Mary Nevin, and her husband Walter Weir (1867-1926), a railway engineer of Fulton & Weir. Her parents seem to have separated soon after (or perhaps slightly before) her birth, as her father then married Helen Granger, his cousin. The family then lived at Ravenslea, a villa in Bearsden. She was raised in the Springburn area of Glasgow. She was educated locally at the Albert School then the Whitehill School in Dennistoun. She trained at Dundas Vale Teacher Training College. She then became a primary school teacher at Bishop Street School in the city centre.

Roberts' political career began in 1929 when she successfully stood for the Kingston ward on the River Clyde. In 1933 Labour gained control of Glasgow and she began being given various committee roles within the town council. In 1936 she was Senior Magistrate for Glasgow and in 1952 was City Treasurer. Becoming leader of the Labour Party in 1955, she was elected Lord Provost (or, technically, "Lady Provost") in 1960. This critical period of tenure involved much slum clearance in the city and she famously toured the Gorbals district with Queen Elizabeth II in 1961, discussing redevelopment proposals and receiving much press coverage during this trip. The Queen created her a Dame Commander of the Order of the British Empire (DBE) in the 1962 Birthday Honours.

Roberts was chair of the Scottish National Orchestra Society. From 1965 to 1972 she was Chair of the Cumbernauld Development Corporation.

== Personal life and death ==
In 1922 she married Cameron Roberts (died 1964), a maths teacher. They had one daughter. Roberts died in Glasgow on 26 March 1988, at the age of 92.

Civic offices
Preceded by Myer Galpern	Lord Provost of Glasgow; 1960–1963	Succeeded by Peter Meldrum
