= 1949 Glasgow Corporation election =

Local election in Scotland

The 1949 Glasgow Corporation elections were held on Tuesday 3 May 1949. The election was held against a wider backdrop of Labour losses across the country, however Labour managed to maintain an overall majority of elected members. The Labour group did see a particularly high-profile loss when the Labour group leader Andrew Hood, the councillor for Provan, lost his seat. The new council was composed entirely of Labour and Progressive members, with all smaller parties having lost their representation.

Whilst the Labour party had won a majority of elected members, the corporation also featured two ex-officio members: the Dean of Guild (Lord Inverclyde) and the Deacon-Convenor. Whilst not party affiliated, these members had traditionally voted with the Progressives. As a result, following the election the Progressives John Donald Kelly took over as council leader; the first Progressive council leader since 1933, when Labour had taken control.

== Election result ==
Glasgow Corporation election, 1949
Party	Seats	Gains	Losses	Net gain/loss	Seats %	Votes %	Votes	+/−
Labour	56							
Progressives	55							

== Ward results ==
=== Anderston ===
Anderston (3) Electorate: 24,815
Party	Candidate	Votes	%	±%
Labour	Neil Johnston*	6,338	63.65	
Labour	Mrs Mary McAlister*	6,223		
Labour	John S. Ratcliffe*	5,578		
Progressives	John F. Gowdie	4681	32.70	
Progressives	David Miller	4638		
Communist	Robert McIlhone	1040	3.65	
Majority		897		
Turnout		28,498 (9,499)	38.28	
Labour hold		Swing		
Labour hold		Swing		
Labour hold		Swing		

=== Calton ===
Calton (3) Electorate: 21,038
Party	Candidate	Votes	%	±%
Labour	Mrs Helen E. Gault*	4,685		
Labour	Joseph McKell*	4,438		
Labour	Thomas G. McLure*	4,437		
Progressives	Andrew Shearer	2,679		
Ind. Labour Party	Francis Kane	555		
Independent	Patrick Farrell	488		
Ind. Labour Party	Charles Hayman	450		
Ind. Labour Party	B. Lavin	354		
Turnout			35.89	

=== Cathcart ===
Cathcart (3) Electorate: 17,591
Party	Candidate	Votes	%	±%
Progressives	Thomas R. Patterson*	8,275		
Progressives	Andrew Donald*	8,271		
Labour	William G. Reid*	8,076		
Labour	James H. Dollan	2097		
Turnout			59.35	

=== Provan ===
Provan (3) Electorate: 15,759
Party	Candidate	Votes	%	±%
Progressives	Alexander Fraser*	4,718		
Progressives	Albert Douglas	4,581		
Labour	David S. Brown*	4,544		
Labour	Andrew Hood* (Labour leader)	4516		
Progressives	Robert Hodgins	4468		
Labour	Robert C. Smith*	4397		
Majority				
Turnout			59.36	
Progressives hold		Swing		
Progressives gain from Labour		Swing		
Labour hold		Swing		

=== Shettleston ===
Shettleston (3) Electorate: 28,165
Party	Candidate	Votes	%	±%
Labour	Myer Galpern	6,597		
Labour	Robert McAllister	6,481		
Labour	Thomas B. Duncan	5,598		
Progressives	James McC. Fergusson	5521		
Progressives	William W. Smith	5389		
Progressives	John J. Macdougall	5175		
Ind. Labour Party	David W. Gibson	3576		
Ind. Labour Party	Cecil Gould	1561		
Ind. Labour Party	Harold I. Maclean	1561		
Communist	Thomas McLaren	973		
Turnout			52.97	
