= 1943 Hamilton by-election =

UK Parliamentary by-election

The 1943 Hamilton by-election was held on 29 January 1943. The by-election was held due to the death of the incumbent Labour MP, Duncan Graham. It was won by the Labour candidate Thomas Fraser.

By-election 1943: Hamilton
Party	Candidate	Votes	%	±%
Labour	Thomas Fraser	10,725	81.1	+15.4
Independent	James Letham	2,503	18.9	New
Majority		8,222	62.2	+30.7
Turnout		13,228		
Labour hold		Swing		
