= Highlands and Islands (European Parliament constituency) =

Former European Parliament constituency

- European Parliament constituency
- Boundary within Scotland (1979–1984)
- Member state: United Kingdom
- Created: 1979
- Dissolved: 1999
- MEPs: 1

Prior to its uniform adoption of proportional representation in 1999, the United Kingdom used first-past-the-post for the European elections in England, Scotland and Wales. The European Parliament constituencies used under that system were smaller than the later regional constituencies and only had one Member of the European Parliament each.

Created for the 1979 European Parliament elections in 1979, Highlands and Islands was a single-member constituency formed from the grouping of numerous neighbouring Scottish constituencies of the UK Parliament.

Boundary within Scotland (1984–1999)

== Boundaries ==
1979–1984: Argyll; Banff; Caithness and Sutherland; Inverness; Moray and Nairn; Orkney and Shetland; Ross and Cromarty; Western Isles

1984–1999: Argyll and Bute; Caithness and Sutherland; Inverness, Nairn and Lochaber; Moray; Orkney and Shetland; Ross, Cromarty and Skye; Western Isles

== Members of the European Parliament ==
Election	Member	Party
1979	Winnie Ewing	SNP
1984	Winnie Ewing	SNP
1989	Winnie Ewing	SNP
1994	Winnie Ewing	SNP

== Election results ==
European elections 1994: Highlands and Islands
Party	Candidate	Votes	%	±%
SNP	Winnie Ewing	74,872	58.4	+6.9
Labour	Michael M. Macmillan	19,956	15.6	+1.7
Conservative	Mark E. Tennant	15,767	12.3	−4.5
Liberal Democrats	Hamish R. Morrison	12,919	10.1	+1.8
Green	Eleanor Scott	3,140	2.4	−7.1
UKIP	Martin B.N. Carr	1,096	0.8	New
Natural Law	Margaret F. Gilmour	522	0.4	New
Majority		54,916	42.8	+8.1
Turnout		128,272	39.1	−1.9
SNP hold		Swing	+2.6	

European elections 1989: Highlands and Islands
Party	Candidate	Votes	%	±%
SNP	Winnie Ewing	66,297	51.5	+9.7
Conservative	Albert McQuarrie	21,602	16.8	+0.8
Labour	N.L. MacAskill	17,848	13.9	−0.2
Green	M.A.O. Gregson	12,199	9.5	New
SLD	Neil Mitchison	10,644	8.3	−19.8
Majority		44,695	34.7	+21.0
Turnout		128,590	41.0	+2.6
SNP hold		Swing	+4.5	

European elections 1984: Highlands and Islands
Party	Candidate	Votes	%	±%
SNP	Winnie Ewing	49,410	41.8	+7.8
Liberal	D.R. Johnston	33,133	28.1	−2.6
Conservative	David Webster	18,847	16.0	−10.1
Labour	John M.M. MacArthur	16,644	14.1	+4.9
Majority		16,277	13.7	+10.4
Turnout		118,034	38.4	−1.0
SNP hold		Swing	+5.2	

European elections 1979: Highlands and Islands
Party	Candidate	Votes	%	±%
SNP	Winnie Ewing	39,991	34.0	
Liberal	D.R. Johnston	36,109	30.7	
Conservative	M. Joughin	30,776	26.1	
Labour	J.G. Watson	10,846	9.2	
Majority		3,882	3.3	
Turnout		117,722	39.4	
SNP win (new seat)				
