= 1978 Hamilton by-election =

UK parliamentary by-election

- 31 May 1978

Constituency of Hamilton
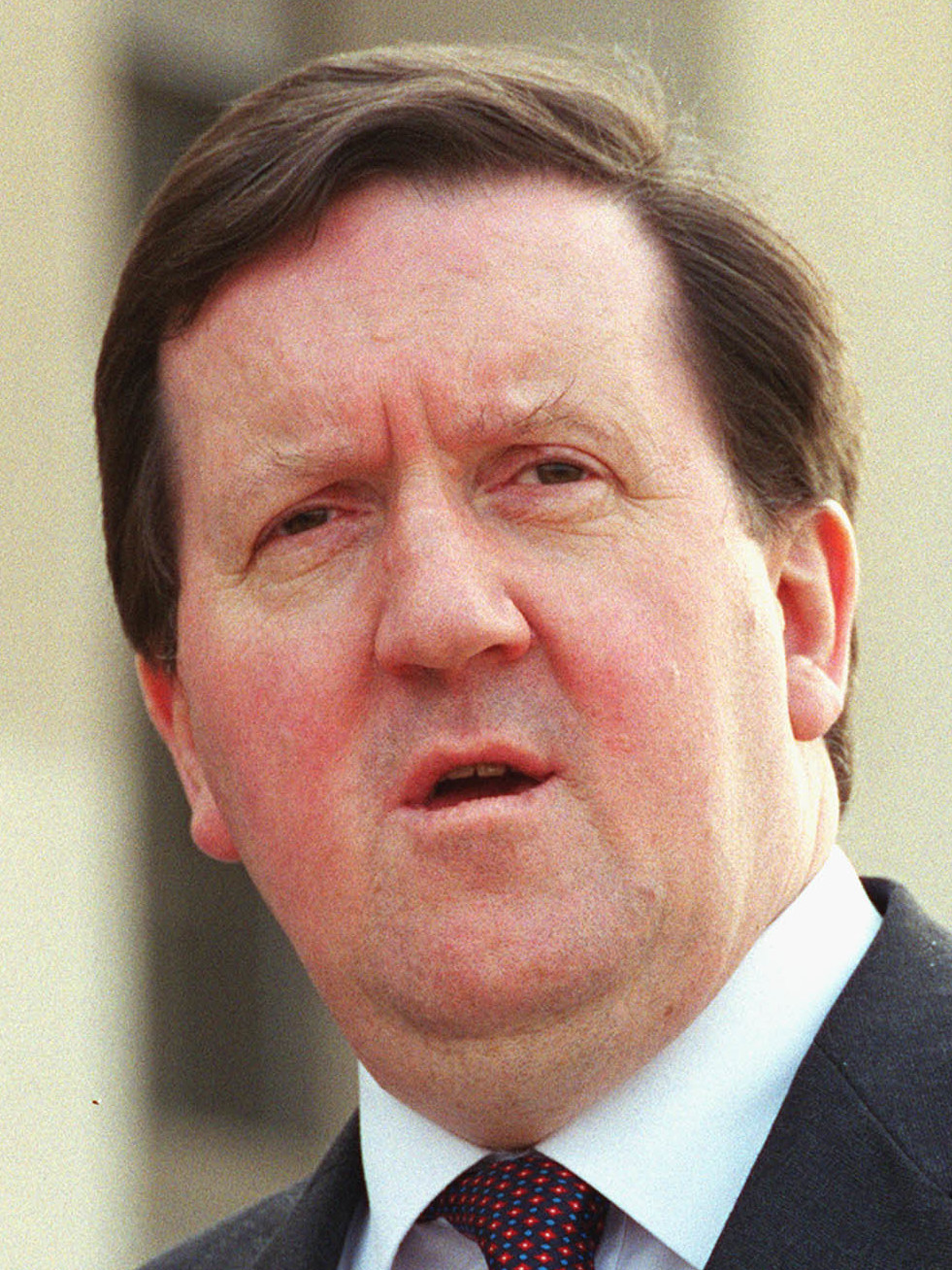

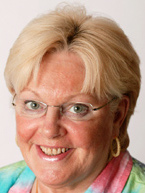

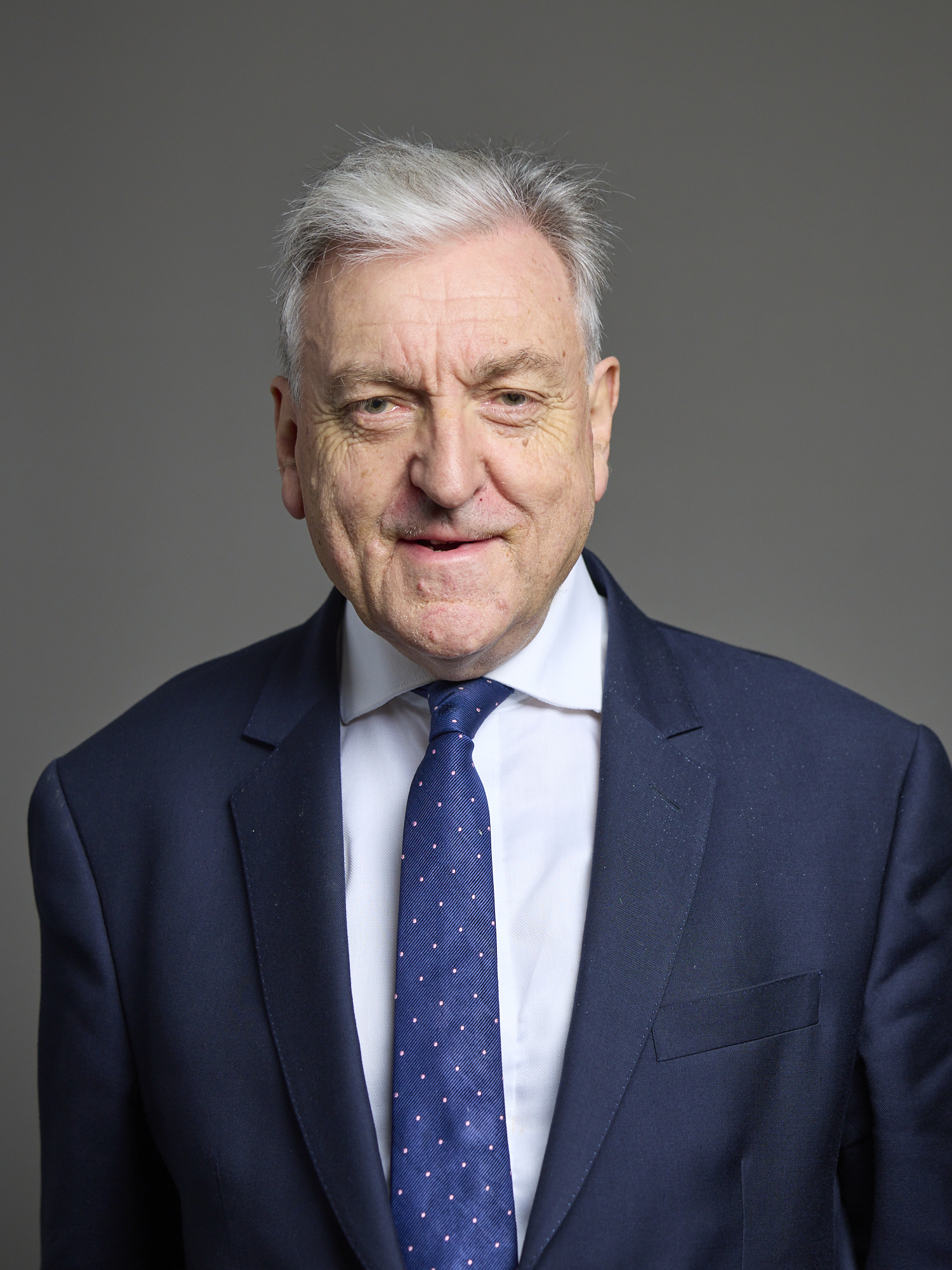
	First party	Second party	Third party
Candidate	George Robertson	Margo MacDonald	Alexander Scrymgeour
Party	Labour	SNP	Conservative
Popular vote	18,880	12,388	4,818
Percentage	51.0%	33.4%	13.0%
Swing	▲3.4%	▼5.6%	▲3.5%
MP before election
Alexander Wilson
Labour
Elected MP
George Robertson
Labour

There was a 1978 by-election for the House of Commons of the United Kingdom in Hamilton on Wednesday 31 May 1978. It was caused by the death of the incumbent Labour Party Member of Parliament Alex Wilson on 23 March of that year.

Within days of Wilson's death, The Glasgow Herald described the by-election as 'the biggest battle the Government has faced in Scotland since the last General Election'. The SNP, which had previously won the seat in a by-election in 1967, were reported to see the contest as an important test of where political opinion in Scotland stood. The SNP's prospective candidate, Margo MacDonald, had a high profile as a former MP and had been working in the constituency for three years. There was also initial uncertainty as to whom Labour would select as a candidate. Wilson's death was unexpected and it had been assumed he would fight the seat at the next general election. John Maxton, nephew of James Maxton, who lived in the constituency, was suggested as a possibility, but he had already been selected to fight Glasgow Cathcart for Labour at the next election.

As the opening game of the 1978 FIFA World Cup was on Thursday 1 June, the by-election was held one day earlier, on the Wednesday. All by-elections since then have been held on a Thursday.

The Labour candidate was George Robertson, who defeated SNP candidate Margo MacDonald, with an increased majority.

It was one of a series of significant Labour victories over the SNP in 1978 which halted their rise at that time.

Hamilton by-election, 1978
Party	Candidate	Votes	%	±%
Labour	George Robertson	18,880	51.0	+3.4
SNP	Margo MacDonald	12,388	33.4	−5.6
Conservative	Alexander Scrymgeour	4,818	13.0	+3.5
Liberal	Fred McDermid	949	2.6	−1.4
Majority		6,492	17.6	+9.0
Turnout		37,035	37.0	−40.2
Labour hold		Swing	+4.5	

== See also ==
- Hamilton (UK Parliament constituency)
- List of United Kingdom by-elections (1950–1979)
