= Winnie Ewing =

Scottish politician (1929–2023)

Winnie Ewing FRSA
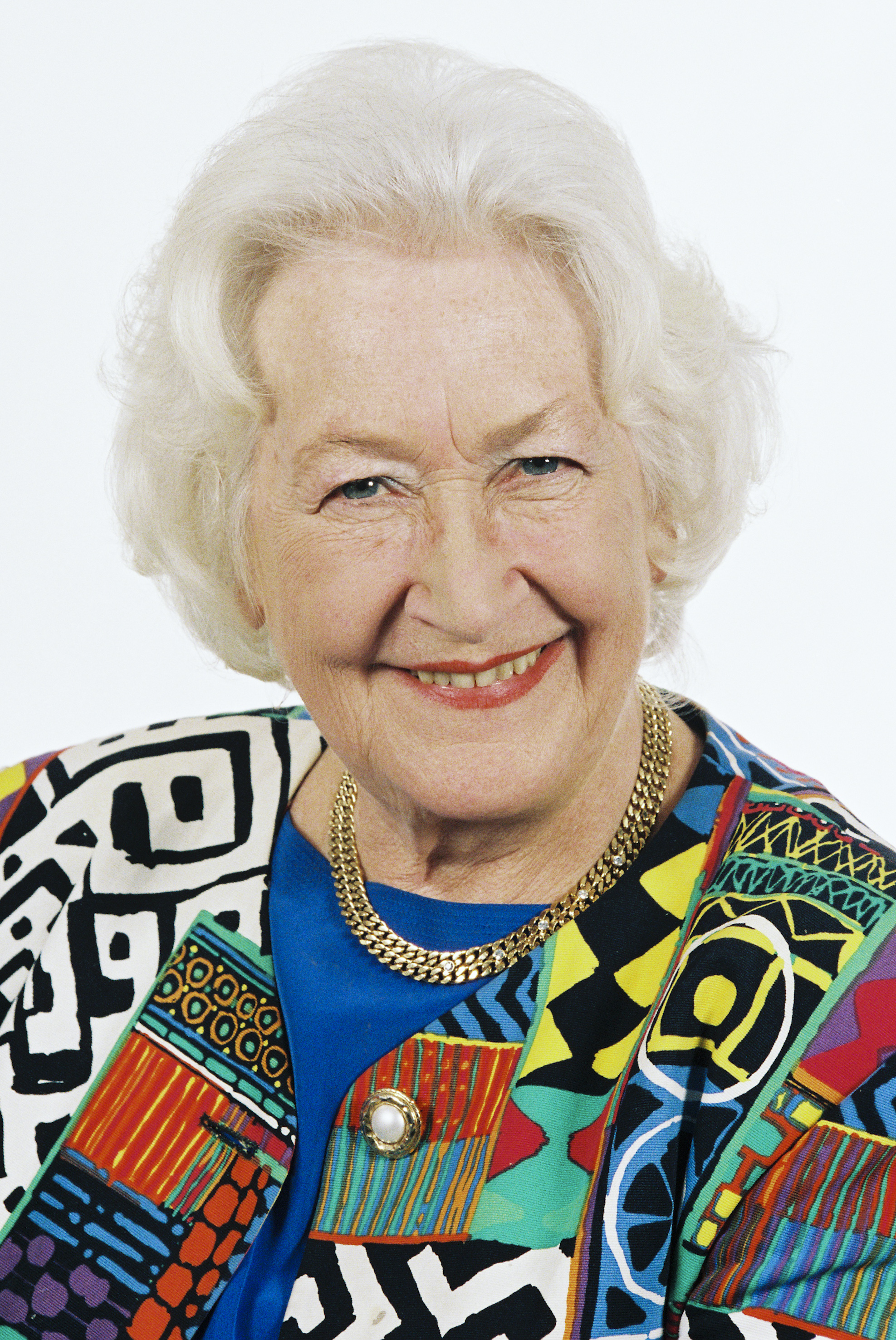
- European Parliament portrait, 1994

President of the Scottish National Party
- In office 1987 – September 2005
- Preceded by: Donald Stewart
- Succeeded by: Ian Hudghton

Member of the Scottish Parliament for Highlands and Islands (1 of 7 Regional MSPs)
- In office 6 May 1999 – 31 March 2003

Member of the European Parliament for Highlands and Islands
- In office 10 June 1979 – 13 June 1999
- Preceded by: Constituency established
- Succeeded by: Constituency abolished

Member of Parliament for Moray and Nairn
- In office 28 February 1974 – 7 April 1979
- Preceded by: Gordon Campbell
- Succeeded by: Alexander Pollock

Member of Parliament for Hamilton
- In office 2 November 1967 – 29 May 1970
- Preceded by: Tom Fraser
- Succeeded by: Alexander Wilson

Personal details
- Born: Winifred Margaret Woodburn; 10 July 1929 Glasgow, Scotland
- Died: 21 June 2023 (aged 93) Bridge of Weir, Renfrewshire Scotland
- Party: Scottish National Party
- Spouse: Stewart Martin Ewing (m. 1956; died 2003)
- Children: 3, including Fergus and Annabelle
- Education: University of Glasgow
- Profession: Solicitor

Winifred Margaret Ewing FRSA (née Woodburn; 10 July 1929 – 21 June 2023) was a Scottish lawyer and politician who figured prominently in the Scottish National Party.

Born and raised in Glasgow, Ewing studied law at the University of Glasgow, where she joined the university's Scottish Nationalist Association. After graduating, she worked as a lawyer, serving as secretary of the Glasgow Bar Association from 1962 to 1967. Ewing was elected to the House of Commons in the 1967 Hamilton by-election and her presence at Westminster led to a rise in membership for the SNP. Although she lost her seat in the 1970 election, she was re-elected in February 1974, this time for the Moray and Nairn constituency. Ewing lost her seat in the 1979 election and, after making numerous attempts to seek re-election, failed to do so.

Ewing was elected to the European Parliament in the 1979 elections, representing the Highlands and Islands. In Europe, she acquired the nickname Madame Écosse because of her advocacy of Scottish interests. In 1987, she became the president of the Scottish National Party. She served as vice president of the European Radical Alliance and by 1995 had become Britain's longest serving MEP. In the first elections to the Scottish Parliament, she was elected to represent the Highlands and Islands. As the oldest qualified member, it was her duty to preside over the opening of the Scottish Parliament.

== Early life ==
Ewing was born Winifred Margaret Woodburn on 10 July 1929 in Glasgow, to Christina Bell Anderson and George Woodburn, a small business owner. She was educated at Battlefield School and Queen's Park Secondary School. In 1946 she matriculated at the University of Glasgow where she graduated with an MA and LLB. Although relatively inactive in politics at that time, she joined the Student Nationalists. Following her graduation, she qualified and practised as a solicitor and notary public. She was Secretary of the Glasgow Bar Association from 1962 to 1967.

== Political career ==
=== Election to Westminster ===
Winnie Ewing in 1967 following her election to Westminster

Ewing became active in campaigning for Scottish independence through her membership of the Glasgow University Scottish Nationalist Association, and won the 1967 Hamilton by-election as the Scottish National Party (SNP) candidate. She was elected with the help of a team including her election agent, John McAteer. On 16 November, she made her first appearance at Westminster, with her husband and children accompanying her on the journey. She arrived at the parliament in a Scottish-built Hillman Imp and was greeted by a crowd and a pipe band.

Ewing said at the time "stop the world, Scotland wants to get on", and her presence at Westminster led to a rise in membership for the SNP. It was speculated that Ewing's electoral gain led to the establishment of the Kilbrandon Commission by the Labour government of Harold Wilson to look into the viability of a devolved Scottish Assembly. In hindsight it could be said to mark the start of modern politics in Scotland, according to Professor Richard Finlay of Strathclyde University, bringing young people and women from non-political backgrounds into politics for the first time, whilst Labour and Tory party organisation and branch numbers were declining.

Despite her high profile, Ewing was unsuccessful in retaining the Hamilton seat at the 1970 general election. At the following February 1974 election she stood for Moray and Nairn and was returned to Westminster, although another election followed in October of the same year when her already marginal majority declined. Following the October election she was announced as the SNP's spokesperson on external affairs and the EEC.

=== European Parliament ===
She first became an MEP in 1975, at a time when the European Parliament was still composed of representative delegations from national parliaments. She lost her Westminster seat at the May 1979 election, but within weeks had gained a seat in the European Parliament at the first direct elections to the Parliament. Ewing was unsuccessful at seeking to return to Westminster as the SNP candidate for Orkney and Shetland in 1983, coming third.

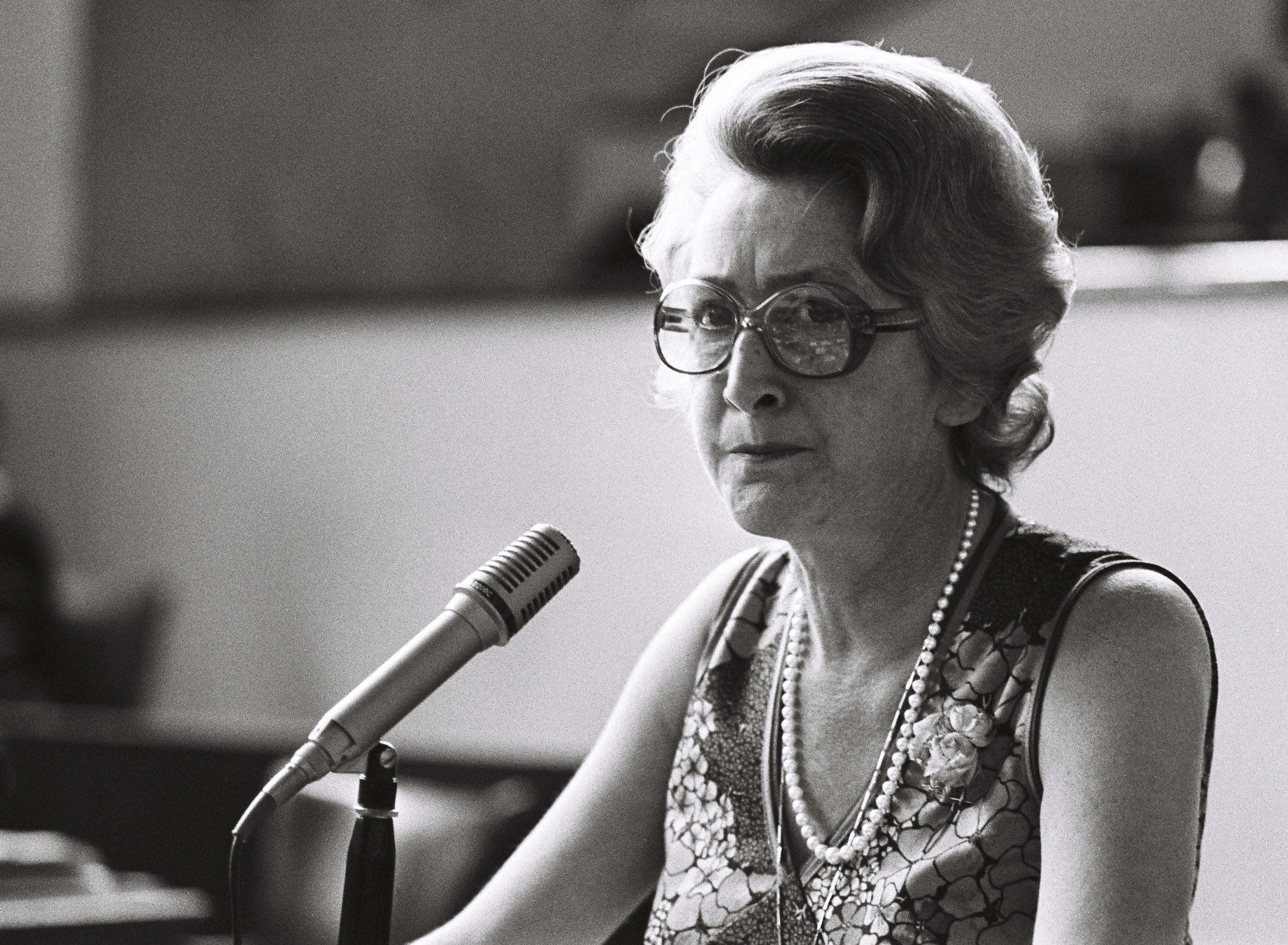
Winnie Ewing in 1976

Ewing was elected the SNP Party President in 1987. It was during her time as an MEP that she acquired the nickname Madame Écosse (French for 'Mrs Scotland') because of her advocacy of Scottish interests in Strasbourg and Brussels. That sobriquet was first used by Le Monde and with Ewing using the term as a badge of pride, it stuck. By 1995 she had become Britain's longest serving MEP. She served as Vice President of the European Radical Alliance, which in addition to the SNP also included French, Belgian, Italian and Spanish MEPs.

=== Scottish Parliament ===
In 1999, she did not stand for the European Parliament, instead becoming a Member of the Scottish Parliament (MSP) in the first session of the Scottish Parliament, representing the Highlands and Islands. As the oldest qualified member, it was her duty to preside over the opening of the Scottish Parliament, a session she opened with the statement: "The Scottish Parliament, adjourned on the 25th day of March in the year 1707, is hereby reconvened". She sat as a member on the European Committee and the Public Petitions Committee.

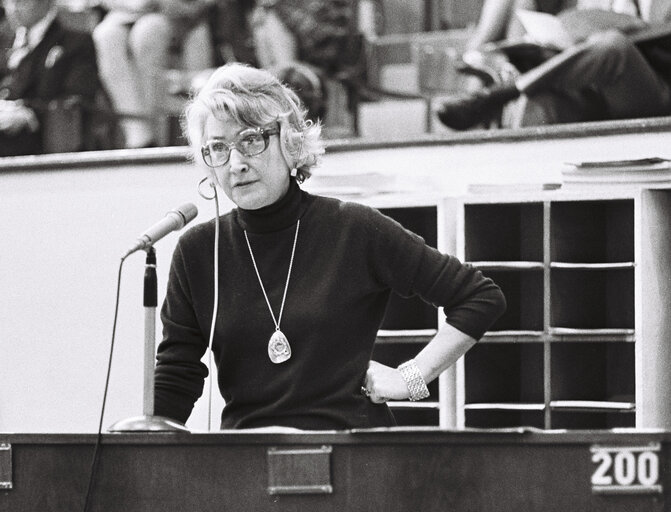
Winnie Ewing in 1976

During the controversy that arose in the early years of the Scottish Parliament surrounding proposals to repeal Clause 28 (a law banning the active promotion of homosexuality in schools), she joined her son Fergus Ewing in abstaining, although her daughter in law Margaret Ewing supported repeal as did the majority of her party's MSPs. In June 2001, having turned 72 years old, she announced that she would retire from Parliament at the end of the session. In January 2003, her husband, Stewart Ewing, died from a heart attack after a fire at their home. He had been active with her in politics for many years, and had himself served as an SNP councillor for the Summerston area in Glasgow, gaining the seat of Dick Dynes, the leader of the Labour Group on Glasgow District Council in 1977, a result described by The Glasgow Herald as "an absolute sensation". Later in 2003 she stood down from being an MSP, although she continued to serve as the SNP's President. On 15 July 2005, she announced she would be stepping down as President of the Scottish National Party at its September Conference, bringing to an end her 38-year career in representative politics.

Nicola Sturgeon said that Ewing had given her "hugely valuable advice" on public speaking, and that Ewing had given her some important advice as a young woman in politics, namely "Stand your ground and believe in yourself" and "a more vibrant, colourful, dynamic, passionate, committed person, you would struggle to meet."

== Outside Parliament ==
Ewing was a vice president of equal rights charity Parity. In April 2009, BBC Alba broadcast a biographical documentary Madame Ecosse, produced by Madmac Productions. It was rebroadcast on BBC Scotland to mark her 80th birthday. Nicola Sturgeon named Ewing as her Political Hero on BBC News in 2018.

== Personal life ==
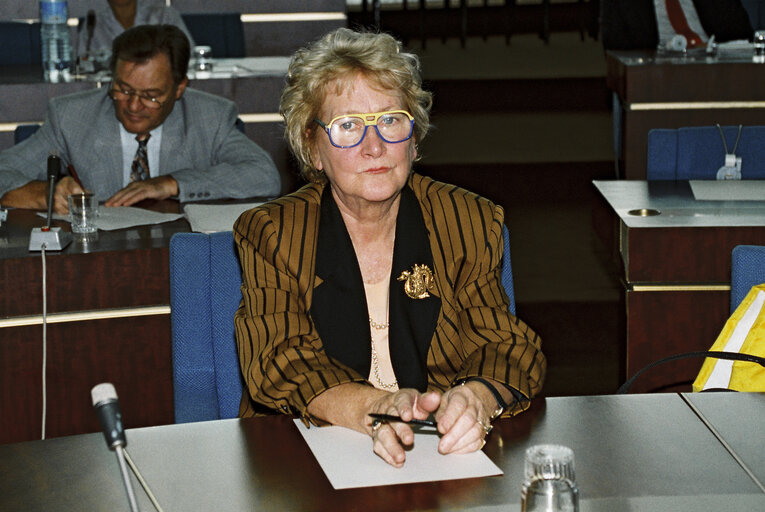
Winnie Ewing in 1993

Winnie and Stewart Ewing had three children, two of whom also went on to a career in politics: their son, Fergus Ewing, was elected to the Scottish Parliament in 1999 and went on to hold several ministerial posts. Their daughter, Annabelle Ewing, was an MP from 2001 to 2005 and was elected an MSP in 2011. Ewing died at her home in Bridge of Weir on 21 June 2023, at age 93.

== Awards and honours ==
In 1990 she was made a fellow of the Royal Society of Arts. In 2003 the Law Society of Scotland made her an honorary member. She was awarded honorary LLD degrees from the University of Glasgow in 1995 and the University of Aberdeen in 2004. She was awarded Doctor of the University degrees from the Open University in 1993 and the University of Stirling in 2012. In 2009, a portrait of her painted by David Donaldson in 1970 was lent to the Scottish Parliament and put on display.

Parliament of the United Kingdom
Preceded by Tom Fraser	Member of Parliament for Hamilton; 1967–1970	Succeeded by Alexander Wilson
Preceded by Gordon Campbell	Member of Parliament for Moray and Nairn; February 1974–1979	Succeeded by Alexander Pollock
European Parliament
New constituency	Member of the European Parliament for Highlands and Islands; 1979–1999	Constituency abolished
Scottish Parliament
New parliament	Member of the Scottish Parliament for Highlands and Islands; 1999–2003; With: Duncan Hamilton and 5 others	Succeeded by Rob Gibson, Jim Mather and 4 others
Party political offices
Preceded by Donald Stewart	President of the Scottish National Party; 1987–2005	Succeeded by Ian Hudghton
