= Hamilton (UK Parliament constituency) =

Parliamentary constituency in the United Kingdom, 1918–1997

- Former burgh constituency for the House of Commons

1918–1997
- Seats: One
- Created from: Mid Lanarkshire
- Replaced by: Hamilton North & Bellshill; Hamilton South

Hamilton was a burgh constituency represented in the House of Commons of the Parliament of the United Kingdom from 1918 to 1997. It elected one Member of Parliament (MP) by the first past the post voting system.

== History ==
The constituency was formed by the division of Lanarkshire constituency. The constituency was split in 1997 to form Hamilton North & Bellshill and Hamilton South.

== Boundaries ==
From 1918 the constituency consisted of "The burgh of Hamilton and the part of the Middle Ward County District which is contained within the extraburghal portion of the parish of Hamilton and the parish of Dalserf."

== Members of Parliament ==
Election	Member	Party	Notes
1918	Duncan Graham	Labour	died 1942
1943 by-election	Tom Fraser	Labour	resigned 1967
1967 by-election	Winnie Ewing	SNP	
1970	Alex Wilson	Labour	died 1978
1978 by-election	George Robertson	Labour	
1997	constituency abolished: see Hamilton North and Bellshill & Hamilton South		

== Election results ==
=== Elections in the 1910s ===
General election 1918: Hamilton
Party		Candidate	Votes	%	±%
	Labour	Duncan Graham	6,988	42.1	
C	Unionist	Henry Keith	4,819	29.0	
	National Democratic	David Gilmour	4,297	25.9	
	Independent Liberal	J. Howard Whitehouse	504	3.0	
Majority			2,169	13.1	
Turnout			16,608	66.4	
	Labour win (new seat)				
C indicates candidate endorsed by the coalition government.

=== Elections in the 1920s ===
General election 1922: Hamilton
Party	Candidate	Votes	%	±%
Labour	Duncan Graham	12,365	57.6	+15.5
Unionist	Henry Keith	9,089	42.4	+13.4
Majority		3,276	15.2	+2.1
Turnout		21,454	78.3	+11.9
Registered electors		27,385		
Labour hold		Swing	+1.1	

Helen Fraser

General election 1923: Hamilton
Party	Candidate	Votes	%	±%
Labour	Duncan Graham	11,858	58.4	+0.8
Liberal	Helen Fraser	8,436	41.6	New
Majority		3,422	16.8	+1.6
Turnout		20,294	73.5	−4.8
Registered electors		27,617		
Labour hold		Swing		

General election 1924: Hamilton
Party	Candidate	Votes	%	±%
Labour	Duncan Graham	13,003	60.8	+2.4
Unionist	Andrew Dewar Gibb	8,372	39.2	New
Majority		4,631	21.6	+4.8
Turnout		21,375	76.5	+3.0
Registered electors		27,930		
Labour hold		Swing		

General election 1929: Hamilton
Party	Candidate	Votes	%	±%
Labour	Duncan Graham	16,595	67.1	+6.3
Unionist	Robert McLellan	7,752	31.3	−7.9
Communist	Frank Moore	395	1.6	New
Majority		8,843	35.8	+14.2
Turnout		24,742	72.2	−4.3
Registered electors		34,248		
Labour hold		Swing	+7.1	

=== Elections in the 1930s ===
General election 1931: Hamilton
Party	Candidate	Votes	%	±%
Labour	Duncan Graham	14,233	53.89	
Unionist	Robert Calver	12,180	46.11	
Majority		2,053	7.78	
Turnout		26,413		
Labour hold		Swing		

General election 1935: Hamilton
Party	Candidate	Votes	%	±%
Labour	Duncan Graham	17,049	65.74	
Unionist	Robert Calver	8,884	34.26	
Majority		8,165	31.48	
Turnout		25,933		
Labour hold		Swing		

=== Elections in the 1940s ===
1943 Hamilton by-election
Party	Candidate	Votes	%	±%
Labour	Tom Fraser	10,725	81.08	
Independent	James Letham	2,503	18.92	New
Majority		8,222	72.16	
Turnout		13,228		
Labour hold		Swing		

General election 1945: Hamilton
Party	Candidate	Votes	%	±%
Labour	Tom Fraser	20,015	73.47	
Unionist	John Ursel Baillie	7,226	26.53	
Majority		12,789	46.94	
Turnout		27,241		
Labour hold		Swing		

=== Elections in the 1950s ===
General election 1950: Hamilton
Party	Candidate	Votes	%	±%
Labour	Tom Fraser	29,292	70.00	
Unionist	Robert C M Monteith	12,555	30.00	
Majority		16,737	40.00	
Turnout		41,847	81.66	
Labour hold		Swing		

General election 1951: Hamilton
Party	Candidate	Votes	%	±%
Labour	Tom Fraser	28,591	68.72	
Unionist	Robert C M Monteith	13,015	31.28	
Majority		15,576	37.44	
Turnout		41,606	80.62	
Labour hold		Swing		

General election 1955: Hamilton
Party	Candidate	Votes	%	±%
Labour	Tom Fraser	26,187	67.41	
Unionist	Geoffrey L Dalzell-Payne	12,661	32.59	
Majority		13,526	34.82	
Turnout		38,848	76.07	
Labour hold		Swing		

General election 1959: Hamilton
Party	Candidate	Votes	%	±%
Labour	Tom Fraser	27,423	66.05	
Unionist	Geoffrey L Dalzell-Payne	11,510	27.72	
SNP	David Robert Rollo	2,586	6.23	New
Majority		15,913	38.33	
Turnout		41,519	79.85	
Labour hold		Swing		

=== Elections in the 1960s ===
General election 1964: Hamilton
Party	Candidate	Votes	%	±%
Labour	Tom Fraser	28,964	71.04	
Unionist	Iain Docherty	11,806	28.96	
Majority		17,158	42.08	
Turnout		40,770	77.53	
Labour hold		Swing		

General election 1966: Hamilton
Party	Candidate	Votes	%	±%
Labour	Tom Fraser	27,865	71.17	
Conservative	Iain J A Dyer	11,289	28.83	
Majority		16,576	42.34	
Turnout		39,154	73.33	
Labour hold		Swing		

1967 Hamilton by-election
Party	Candidate	Votes	%	±%
SNP	Winnie Ewing	18,397	46.01	New
Labour	Alexander Wilson	16,598	41.51	−29.66
Conservative	Iain J A Dyer	4,986	12.47	−16.36
Majority		1,799	4.50	N/A
Turnout		39,981		
SNP gain from Labour		Swing	+37.9	

=== Elections of the 1970s ===
General election 1970: Hamilton
Party	Candidate	Votes	%	±%
Labour	Alexander Wilson	25,431	53.0	−18.2
SNP	Winnie Ewing	16,849	35.1	N/A
Conservative	John Ross Harper	5,455	11.4	−17.4
Independent Scottish Liberal	Harry Charles Taylor	295	0.6	New
Majority		8,582	17.9	−24.4
Turnout		48,030	79.6	+6.3
Labour hold		Swing		

General election February 1974: Hamilton
Party	Candidate	Votes	%	±%
Labour	Alexander Wilson	19,070	48.0	−5.0
SNP	Ian Macdonald	12,692	31.9	−3.2
Conservative	James Douglas-Hamilton	7,977	20.1	+8.7
Majority		6,378	16.1	N/A
Turnout		39,739	79.7	+0.1
Labour hold		Swing		

General election October 1974: Hamilton
Party	Candidate	Votes	%	±%
Labour	Alexander Wilson	18,487	47.6	−0.4
SNP	Ian Macdonald	15,155	39.0	+7.1
Conservative	Gerald Warner	3,682	9.5	−10.6
Liberal	John Calder	1,559	4.0	New
Majority		3,332	8.6	−7.5
Turnout		38,883	77.2	−2.5
Labour hold		Swing		

1978 Hamilton by-election
Party	Candidate	Votes	%	±%
Labour	George Robertson	18,880	51.0	+3.4
SNP	Margo MacDonald	12,388	33.4	−5.6
Conservative	Alexander Scrymgeour	4,818	13.0	+3.5
Liberal	Fred McDermid	949	2.6	−1.4
Majority		6,492	17.6	+9.0
Turnout		37,035	37.0	−40.2
Labour hold		Swing	+4.5	

General election 1979: Hamilton
Party	Candidate	Votes	%	±%
Labour	George Robertson	24,593	59.7	+12.1
Conservative	Peter Davidson	9,794	23.8	+14.3
SNP	Charles Stoddart	6,842	16.6	−22.4
Majority		14,799	35.9	+27.3
Turnout		41,229	79.6	+2.4
Labour hold		Swing		

=== Elections of the 1980s ===
General election 1983: Hamilton
Party	Candidate	Votes	%	±%
Labour	George Robertson	24,384	52.4	−8.4
Liberal	Stewart Donaldson	9,635	20.2	New
Conservative	Margaret Scott	8,940	19.2	−5.2
SNP	Mairi Whitehead	3,816	8.2	−6.3
Majority		14,749	32.2	−3.7
Turnout		46,775	75.7	+0.8
Labour hold		Swing		

General election 1987: Hamilton
Party	Candidate	Votes	%	±%
Labour	George Robertson	28,563	59.7	+7.3
Conservative	Gary Mond	6,901	14.4	−4.8
Liberal	Timothy McKay	6,302	13.2	−7.0
SNP	Christopher Crossley	6,093	12.7	+4.5
Majority		21,662	45.3	+13.1
Turnout		48,859	76.9	+1.2
Labour hold		Swing	+8.0	

=== Elections of the 1990s ===
General election 1992: Hamilton
Party	Candidate	Votes	%	±%
Labour	George Robertson	25,849	55.2	−4.5
SNP	Bill Morrison	9,246	19.7	+7.0
Conservative	Margaret Mitchell	8,250	17.6	+3.2
Liberal Democrats	John Oswald	3,515	7.5	−5.7
Majority		16,603	35.5	−8.8
Turnout		46,860	76.2	−0.7
Labour hold		Swing		
