= Myer Galpern =

British politician

The Right Honourable The Lord Galpern DL
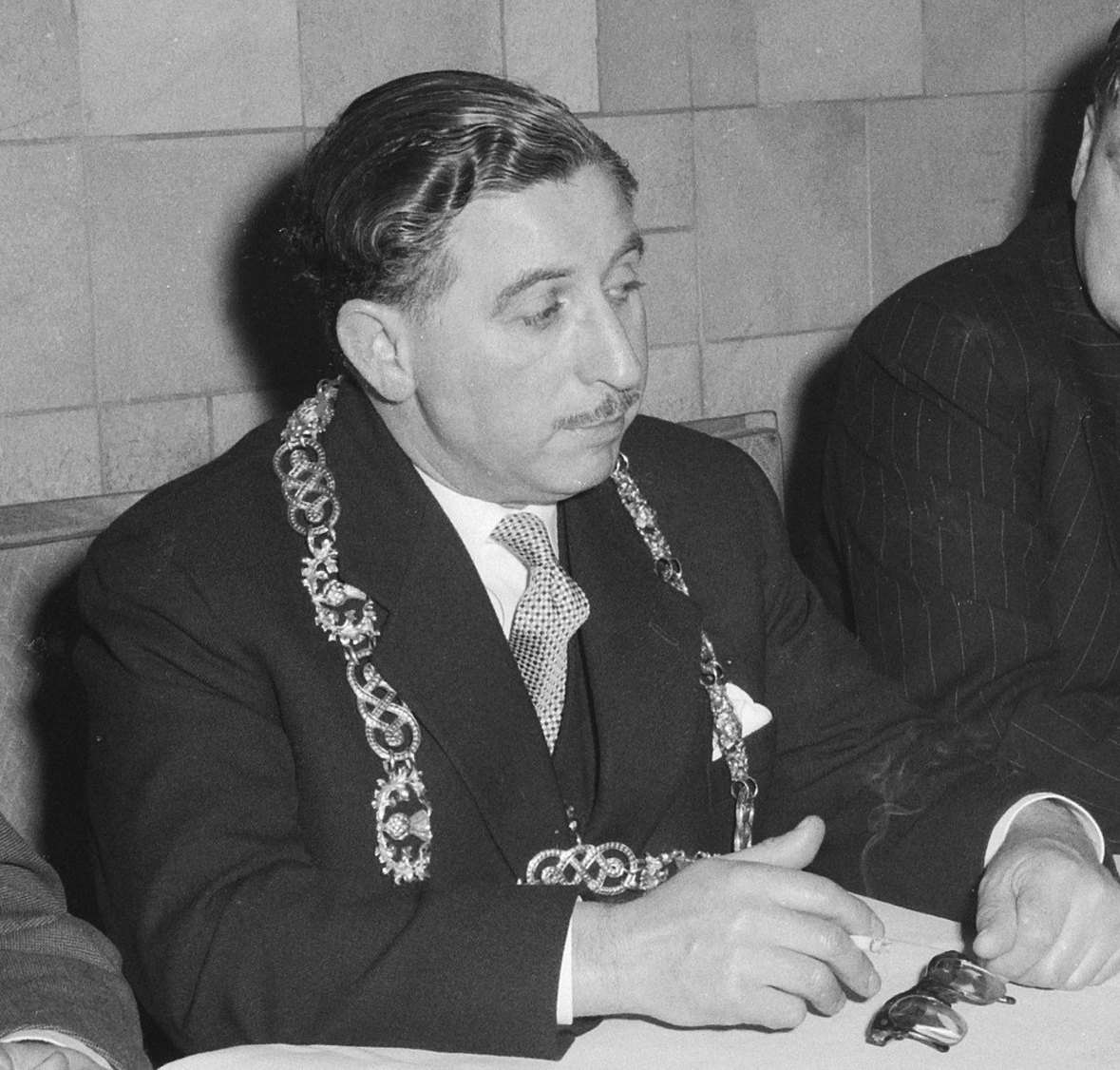
- Galpern in 1959

Deputy Speaker of the House of Commons First Deputy Chairman of Ways and Means
- In office 3 February 1976 – 10 May 1979
- Speaker: George Thomas
- Preceded by: Oscar Murton
- Succeeded by: Godman Irvine

Deputy Speaker of the House of Commons Second Deputy Chairman of Ways and Means
- In office 28 February 1974 – 3 February 1976
- Speaker: Selwyn Lloyd
- Preceded by: Oscar Murton
- Succeeded by: Godman Irvine

Lord Provost of Glasgow
- In office 1958–1960
- Preceded by: Andrew Hood
- Succeeded by: Jean Roberts

Member of the House of Lords Lord Temporal
- In office 10 July 1979 – 23 September 1993; Life peerage

Member of Parliament for Glasgow Shettleston
- In office 8 October 1959 – 7 April 1979
- Preceded by: John McGovern
- Succeeded by: David Marshall

Personal details
- Born: 1 January 1903
- Died: 23 September 1993 (aged 90)
- Party: Labour
- Education: University of Glasgow

Myer Galpern, Baron Galpern, DL (1 January 1903 – 23 September 1993) was a Scottish Labour Party politician.

== Biography ==
Born Meyer Galpern at Rutherglen Road, Hutchesontown, in the Gorbals, the son of Morris Galpern, a cabinetmaker, and Anna Talisman. His parents were Russian-Jewish immigrants from Minsk, Belarus, who were married in Glasgow on 3 January 1900.

Galpern was educated at Hutchesons' Boys Grammar School and the University of Glasgow before he entered the family's furnishing business. He joined the Independent Labour Party (ILP), chaired its Woodside branch and served on its executive. in 1931, he was elected Chairman of the Glasgow Federation of the ILP. in 1932, he won his seat in the Shettleston (and Tollcross) ward in the east end of Glasgow after having unsuccessfully contested Partick East and Cathcart in previous years. He was an Independent Labour Party councillor for the Shettleston and Tollcross ward on the Glasgow Corporation from 1932 to 1947.

From his seat in the "concealed bed" beneath the public gallery...he has already impressed as a keen, alert, member who can put his points with both conciseness and candour. Prior to his success in Shettleston, Mr, Galpern - a dapper little chap - tried conclusions at Cathcart and Partick East. He has spoken in many corners throughout the country - his "play" being his party. In the Council he has the distinction of being on the General Finance Committee as well as the Markets and Streets.

Galpern joined the General Finance and Markets and Streets Committees. In 1943 he was appointed Depute River Bailie, becoming a Bailie of the Burgh in November 1944. Shortly after the Second World War he was appointed Senior Bailie. In 1947 he left the ILP and resigned his Shettleston seat but, having joined the Labour Party, he was re-elected as councillor for Shettleston and Tollcross in 1949.

Galpern served as Convener of the Education Committee (1954-1958), before being appointed in 1958 as leader of the Labour group on Glasgow Corporation and leader of the city's administration. He served as Lord Provost of Glasgow from 1958 to 1960 (the first Jewish provost in Scotland). He was a member of the Court of Glasgow University, a governor of the Royal College of Science and Deputy lieutenant of the Glasgow Corporation from 1958.

During the 1950s, he helped to establish the Kosher School Meals Service, which was set up at Garnethill Synagogue. In May 1958, he was instrumental in the erection of the first Bayit (clubhouse) of the Glasgow Habonim, an organisation of Zionist youth.

Galpern was Labour Member of Parliament (MP) for Glasgow Shettleston from 1959 to 1979, becoming the first Jewish MP in Glasgow. He was a Deputy Speaker of the House of Commons during his final five-year term as an MP, from 1974 to 1979. Having been knighted in 1960, he resigned from the Town Council, thus serving only two - rather than the normal three - years as Lord Provost. He was given a life peerage as Baron Galpern of Shettleston in the District of the City of Glasgow 10 July 1979.

Parliament of the United Kingdom
| Preceded by John McGovern | Member of Parliament for Glasgow Shettleston; 1959–1979 | Succeeded by David Marshall |
Civic offices
| Preceded by Andrew Hood | Lord Provost of Glasgow; 1958–1960 | Succeeded by Jean Roberts |
