= Alexander Wilson (Scottish politician) =

Alexander Wilson (5 June 1917 – 23 March 1978) was a Scottish Labour politician who was the MP for Hamilton from 1970 until his death.

Wilson was educated at the Forth Grammar School, before becoming a coal miner. He joined the Labour Party, and served on the Third District Council of Lanarkshire for eleven years. Wilson married in 1941, and had two children.

Wilson's first parliamentary contest was the Hamilton by-election of 1967, in which he lost to the Scottish National Party candidate Winifred Ewing. However, Wilson was able to gain the seat from her at the 1970 general election. He was sponsored by the National Union of Mineworkers and became secretary of a miners' group in parliament. He was described as a moderate.

Wilson held the seat until his death at Law Hospital on 23 March 1978, aged 60, following an operation. George Robertson, the future NATO Secretary-General, was elected as his successor in the subsequent by-election.

Parliament of the United Kingdom
Preceded by Winnie Ewing	Member of Parliament for Hamilton; 1970–1978	Succeeded by George Robertson
