= George Robertson, Baron Robertson of Port Ellen =

British politician

The Right Honourable The Lord Robertson of Port Ellen KT GCMG PC FRSA FRSE
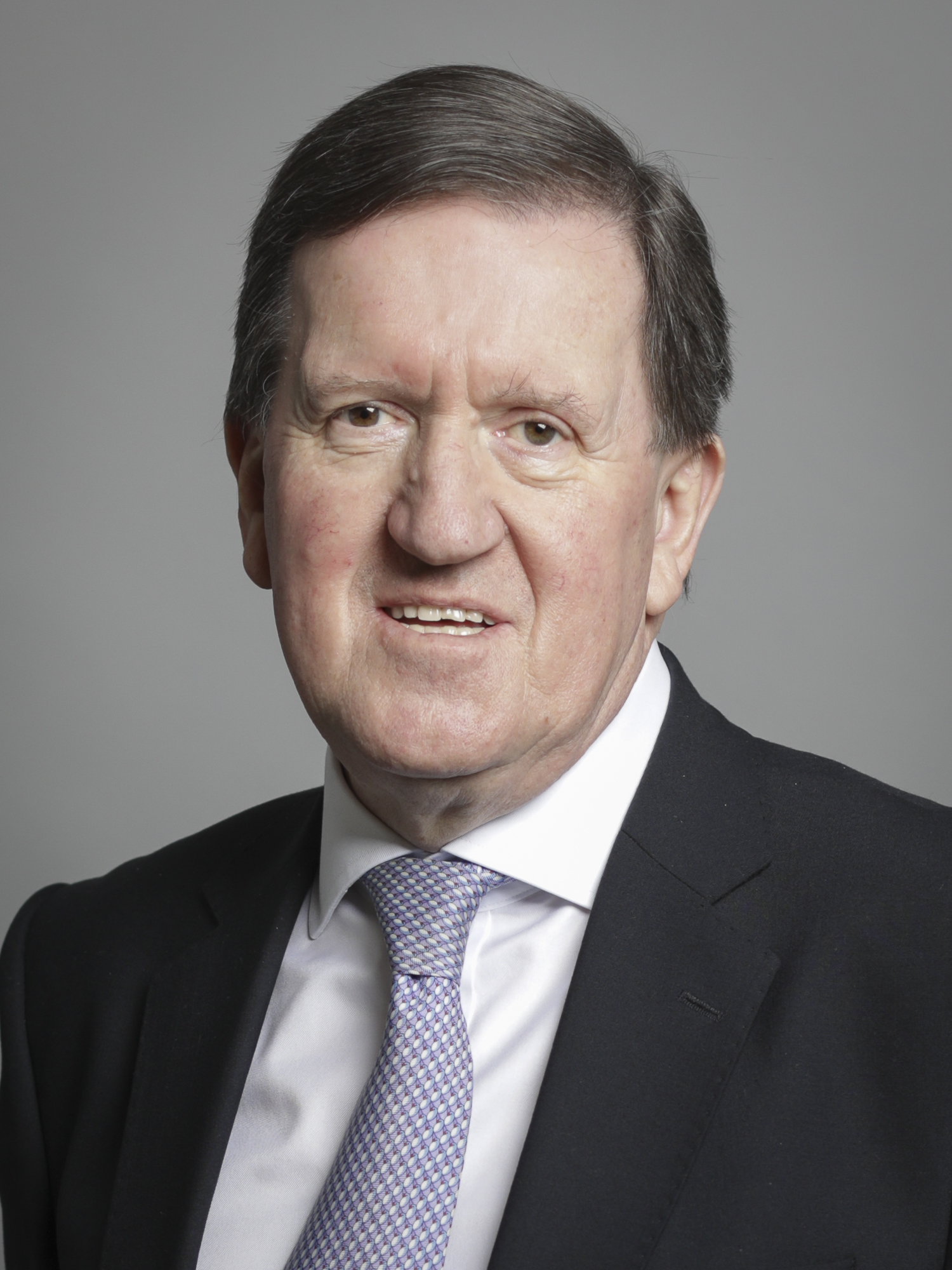
- Official portrait, 2020

10th Secretary General of NATO
- In office 14 October 1999 – 17 December 2003
- Deputy: Sergio Balanzino; Alessandro Minuto-Rizzo
- Preceded by: Javier Solana
- Succeeded by: Jaap de Hoop Scheffer

Secretary of State for Defence
- In office 3 May 1997 – 11 October 1999
- Prime Minister: Tony Blair
- Preceded by: Michael Portillo
- Succeeded by: Geoff Hoon

Shadow Secretary of State for Scotland
- In office 21 October 1993 – 2 May 1997
- Leader: John Smith; Margaret Beckett (acting); Tony Blair
- Preceded by: Tom Clarke
- Succeeded by: Jacqui Lait (2001)

Member of the House of Lords
- Lord Temporal
- Life peerage 24 August 1999

Member of Parliament for Hamilton South Hamilton (1978–1997)
- In office 31 May 1978 – 24 August 1999
- Preceded by: Alexander Wilson
- Succeeded by: William Tynan

Personal details
- Born: George Islay MacNeill Robertson; 12 April 1946 (age 80) Port Ellen, Argyll, Scotland
- Party: Labour
- Spouse: Sandra Wallace (m. 1970)
- Children: 3
- Education: University of Dundee

George Islay MacNeill Robertson, Baron Robertson of Port Ellen (born 12 April 1946) is a British politician who served as the 10th secretary general of NATO from 1999 to 2003. A member of the Labour Party, he previously served as Secretary of State for Defence from 1997 to 1999 and Shadow Secretary of State for Scotland from 1993 to 1997. He was Member of Parliament (MP) for Hamilton South (formerly Hamilton) from 1978 to 1999 and was appointed to the House of Lords as a life peer in 2000. He currently serves as Chancellor of the University of Dundee.

== Early life and education ==
Robertson was born on 12 April 1946 in Port Ellen, Isle of Islay, Scotland, the son of George Philip Robertson (1916–2002) and Marion Isabella Robertson (née MacNeill; 1913–1996). His mother taught French and German, and his father was a policeman. His maternal grandfather Malcolm McNeill was the police sergeant at Bowmore during World War One, and wrote about the kindness of local people in shipwreck tragedies of SS Tuscania and HMS Otranto. Robertson was educated at Dunoon Grammar School and studied economics at Queen's College, Dundee. When he was 15 years of age, he was involved with protests against US nuclear submarines docking in Scotland.

During Robertson's time at Queen's College it broke away from the University of St Andrews to become the University of Dundee, of which Robertson was one of the first graduates (MA, 1968), and one of a minority of graduates that year who opted to take a Dundee, rather than a St Andrews, degree. During his time at University he played a full part in student life. He wrote a column for the student newspaper Annasach, launched in 1967, and took an active role in student protests. Robertson used his newspaper column to back the new University and encouraged his fellow students to take a University of Dundee degree (students who had started before 1967 could opt to take a degree from either the University of Dundee or the University of St Andrews).

In 1968, Robertson was one of a number of Dundee students to invade the pitch during a rugby match at St Andrews involving a team from the Orange Free State to protest against apartheid. The same year he organised a 24-hour work-in by students in the university library in opposition to proposed cuts by the government in student grants.

== Political career ==
=== Member of parliament ===
Robertson entered the House of Commons as a Labour MP in 1978, having won the Hamilton by-election in May of that year, caused by the death of the incumbent Labour MP Alex Wilson that March. Margo MacDonald of the SNP came second. Robertson retained the constituency with an increased majority and obtained 51% of the overall vote. He was re-elected to Parliament at five subsequent general elections, was Chairman of the Labour Party in Scotland, and was appointed to the Privy Council.

In 1995, Robertson, while he was Shadow Secretary of State for Scotland said, "Devolution will kill Nationalism stone dead". This quote was designed to assuage hopes that devolution would provide a greater platform for the Scottish National Party (SNP). Robertson's quote is frequently recalled, usually in a mocking fashion, since the SNP have been the largest party in the Scottish Parliament, and have governed Scotland since 2007.

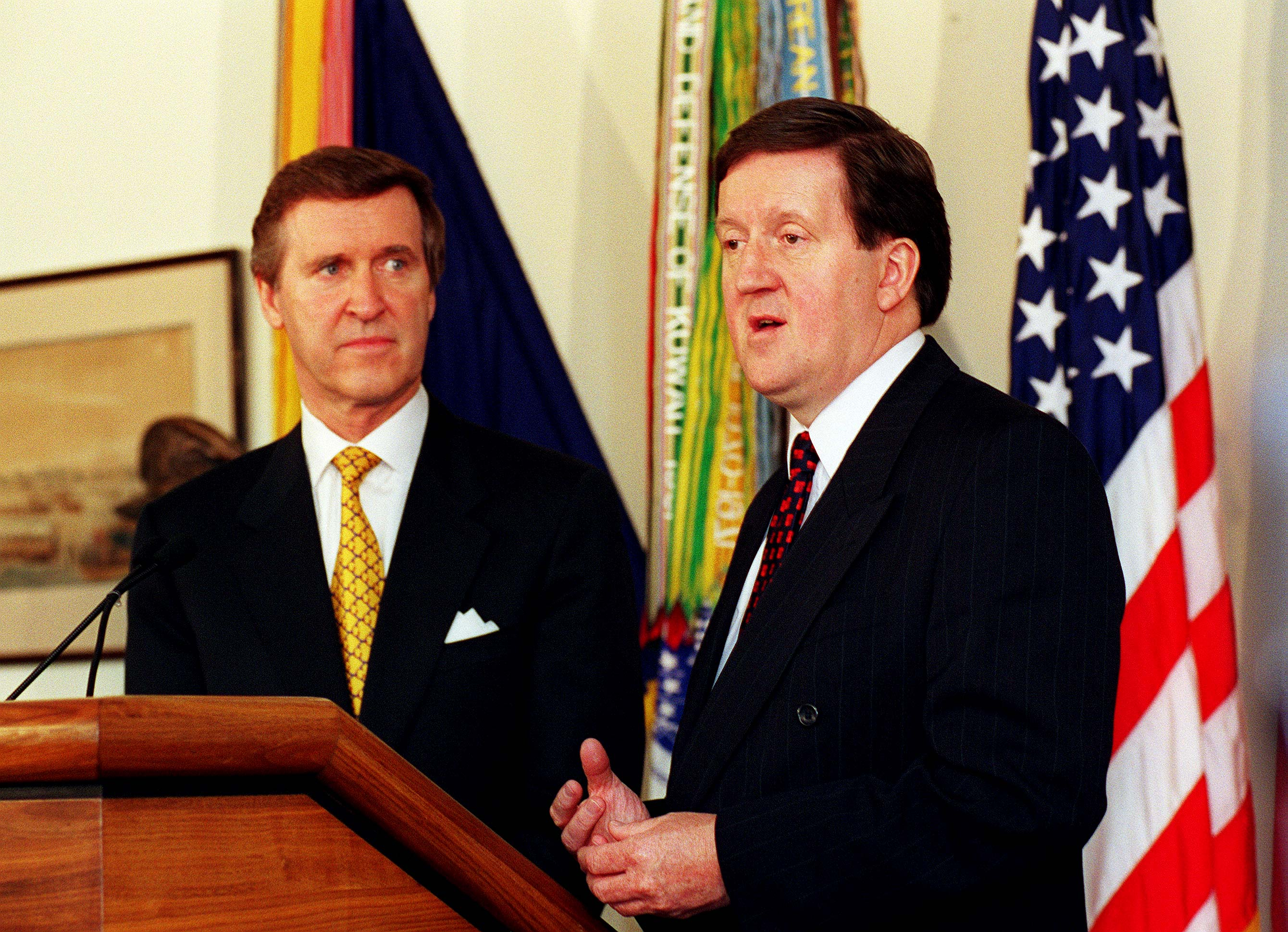
Robertson with U.S. Secretary of Defense William Cohen at the Pentagon on 3 June 1998

After Labour won the 1997 general election and Tony Blair became the prime minister, Robertson was appointed Secretary of State for Defence. He initiated the Strategic Defence Review, which was completed in 1998. The review created the Joint Rapid Reaction Force and inaugurated the ambitious project to build two new large aircraft carriers for force projection, the Queen Elizabeth-class, and its new warplanes, symbolising the new government's commitment to defence. However the new Labour government had come to power promising to follow the previous Conservative government's spending plans for its first two years, and this required a defence budget cut of £2 billion. Though the defence budget was subsequently expanded, it was not sufficient for the increased ambitions of the review. Tom Bower, in his book on that government, argued that "Robertson had created an unaffordable dream in 1998." Historian David Edgerton wrote that the SDR committed Britain "to acting primarily with the USA in a wide-ranging programme of global policing" and that our armed forces were designed for "Britain to be the USA's principal partner" rather than for autonomous defence.

=== Secretary general of NATO ===
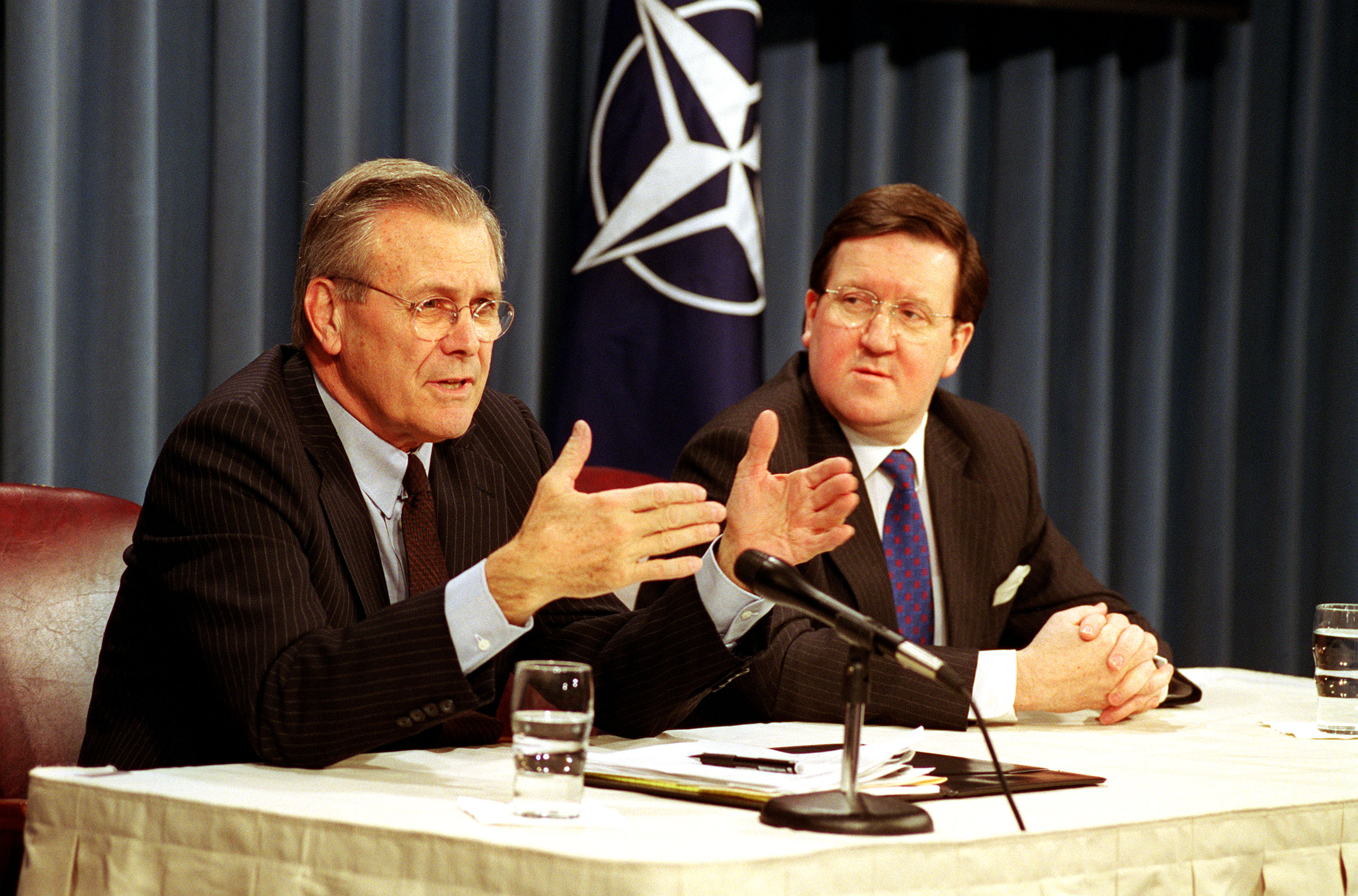
Robertson with U.S. Secretary of Defense Donald Rumsfeld at the Pentagon on 8 March 2001

In 1999, Robertson was appointed Secretary General of NATO after the German defence minister Rudolf Scharping declined the position, and doubts were raised about the suitability of the British politician and former Royal Marine Paddy Ashdown (at that time the outgoing leader of the Liberal Democrats) due to his never having held a position in government.

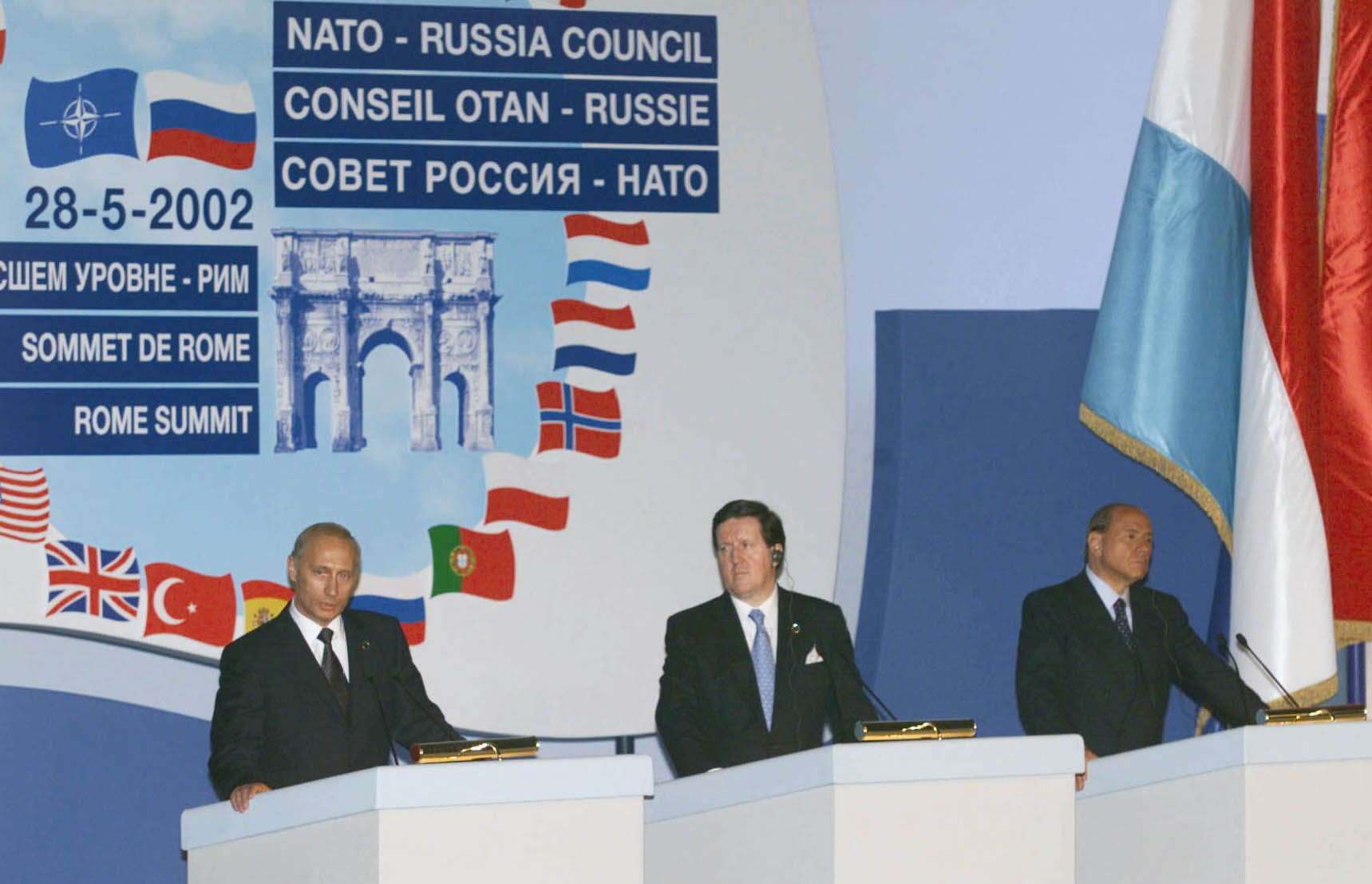
Robertson, Italian prime minister Silvio Berlusconi and Russian president Vladimir Putin at the Russia-NATO Summit at Pratica di Mare Air Base in Italy on 28 May 2002

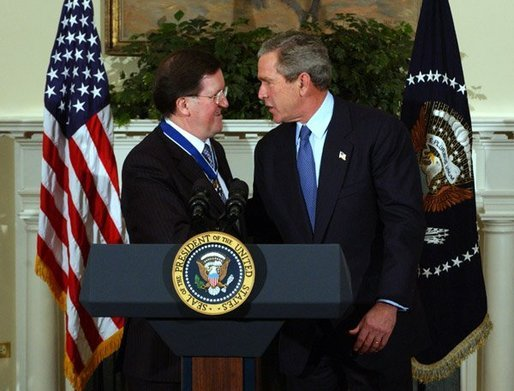
Robertson with U.S. president George W. Bush on 12 November 2003

Robertson was the Secretary General of NATO at the time of the United States invasion of Afghanistan. In October 2001, NATO invoked Article V of the North Atlantic Treaty for the first time in its history.

In December 2002, before the US-led invasion of Iraq, Robertson declared that NATO had a "moral obligation" to support the United States if it attacked Iraq.

== Political commentary and other roles ==
=== Independence referendum interventions ===
Robertson opposed Scottish independence in the 2014 referendum. In an article in The Washington Post, he wrote: "The residual United Kingdom would still be a major player in the world, but upon losing a third of its land mass, 5 million of its population and a huge amount of credibility, its global standing would inevitably diminish."

He said in a speech to the Brookings Institution on 8 April 2014: "The loudest cheers for the break-up of Britain would be from our adversaries and from our enemies. For the second military power in the west to shatter this year would be cataclysmic in geo-political terms." Robertson also likened the efforts of Unionists to keep Scotland tied to the UK with those of Abraham Lincoln's fight against slavery when he stated, "they might look more relevantly at the Civil War where hundreds of thousands of Americans perished in a war to keep the new Union together. To Lincoln and his compatriots the Union was so precious, so important, and its integrity so valuable that rivers of blood would be spilt to keep it together."

=== Comments on military actions ===
In August 2021, he criticised the withdrawal of NATO troops from Afghanistan, saying that "We never really took Afghanistan and the conflict there with the seriousness that it demanded."

In September 2022, during the 7th month of the Russian invasion of Ukraine, interviewed by Channel 4 about his nine meetings with Vladimir Putin, Robertson said, "At the first meeting (in Moscow, Oct 2001) Vladimir Putin clearly said, 'I WANT RUSSIA TO BE PART OF WESTERN EUROPE...at the 2nd meeting (in Brussels) he said..'WHEN ARE YOU GOING TO INVITE RUSSIA TO JOIN NATO?'...I started to sort of reach out and engage them in so many activities that they basically couldn't fight with us.. but after I left NATO (in Dec 2003), the American administration, the Bush administration (during their own illegal war on Iraq opposed by Putin), lost any interest basically in doing business with Russia, they saw it as a threat..they didn't really want to make it part of the overall partnership. I think we missed an opportunity at that time because I think it's what he (Putin) wanted, and we could have grabbed hold of him!"

=== 2025 Strategic Defence Review ===
On 16 July 2024, the newly elected Labour government of Keir Starmer announced the commencement of the 2025 Strategic Defence Review, led by Robertson.

In April 2026 he accused Starmer of "corrosive complacency" towards defence. In his speech he also said "We cannot defend Britain with an ever-expanding welfare budget." Later at a Chatham House seminar he acknowledged that the UK's "high level of military dependence on the US is no longer tenable" and that the UK "must rapidly pivot to becoming a more autonomous military actor".

In 2026, Robertson took part in a TV series called The Wargame, hosted by Cathy Newman, in which members of the cast "reflect on the pressures of decision-making at the highest level and explore the wider questions raised from this thrilling documentary series".

=== Other posts ===
- Chancellor of the University of Dundee (since September 2023)
- Member of the Top Level Group of UK Parliamentarians for Multilateral Nuclear Disarmament and Non-proliferation, established in October 2009
- Hon president of the Clan Donnachaidh Society
- Former joint president of and current senior advisor to Chatham House
- Senior Counselor in The Cohen Group
- Special Advisor to BP
- Former director of BP Russian Investments Ltd 2014-2020
- Member of the Advisory Board, the Global Panel Foundation—and the 4th recipient of the Hanno R. Ellenbogen Citizenship Award

== Personal life ==
Robertson married Sandra Wallace on 1 June 1970. They have two sons and a daughter. Robertson supports Hamilton Academical football club.

Robertson survived a serious car crash on 19 January 1976 when a Navy Land Rover, which was carrying 100 lb (45 kg) of gelignite and a box of detonators, hit his car head-on in the Drumochter Pass, one mile south of Dalwhinnie leaving him with two injured knees and a broken jaw. In May 1976 the driver of the Land Rover was found guilty of careless driving. Robertson was wearing a seat belt at the time and attributed his survival to this.

=== Dunblane libel action ===
Robertson's three children are former pupils of the school in Dunblane where gunman Thomas Hamilton murdered 16 children and their teacher in 1996. After the massacre, Robertson, a long-time resident of the town, acted as a spokesman for the victims' families. He was also a key figure in the subsequent campaign that led to the ban on handguns in Great Britain.

In 2003, the Sunday Herald newspaper ran an article entitled "Should the Dunblane dossier be kept secret?", a reference to documents relating to the Cullen Inquiry into the massacre which are to remain classified for 100 years. In a discussion board on the newspaper's website, anonymous contributors claimed that Robertson had signed a recommendation for a gun licence for Thomas Hamilton in his capacity as Hamilton's MP. However, Robertson had never been the gunman's MP, and the claims were unfounded. Robertson sued the Sunday Herald and the paper settled by paying him a five-figure sum plus costs. A subsequent action by Robertson, related to the terms of the newspaper's apology, was unsuccessful. The first case became an important test case as to whether publishers can be held responsible for comments posted on their websites.

== Honours and awards ==
Domestic Honours

- (Scotland) 2004 Knight of the Order of the Thistle (KT)

Foreign Honours

- 2003 Grand Cross of the Order of Merit of the Grand Duchy of Luxembourg
- (Croatia) 2003 Grand Cross of the Grand Order of King Petar Krešimir IV
- (Estonia) 2004 Knight Grand Cross of the Order of the Cross of Terra Mariana

Organisation

- (United States) 2000 Golden Plate Award of the American Academy of Achievement presented by General Joseph Ralston, USAF, Supreme Allied Commander Europe.
- 2003 US Presidential Medal of Freedom presented by George W. Bush

=== Academic Appointments ===
- Robertson has been awarded an honorary degree by the Universities of Paisley, Dundee, Bradford, St Andrews, Glasgow Caledonian, Lincoln, Robert Gordon University, Stirling, Cranfield University (Royal Military College of Science), Baku State University of Azerbaijan, the Academy of Science of the Kyrgyzstan Republic, European University of Armenia, and the Romanian National School of Political and Administrative Studies in Bucharest.

Coat of arms of George Robertson, Baron Robertson of Port Ellen
Crest An oyster-catcher statant Proper. Escutcheon Per chevron Gules and Argent on a chevron counter-compony Sable and the second between in chief a cinquefoil Ermine between two wolves' heads erased of the second and in base a representation of the Port Ellen lighthouse Proper a portcullis chained of the third. Supporters Dexter a blackfaced tup sinister a Highland cow both Proper. Motto Furachas Is Duchas

Parliament of the United Kingdom
Preceded by Alexander Wilson	Member of Parliament for Hamilton; 1978–1997	Constituency abolished
New constituency	Member of Parliament for Hamilton South; 1997–1999	Succeeded by William Tynan
Political offices
Preceded by Tom Clarke	Shadow Secretary of State for Scotland; 1993–1997	Vacant Title next held by Jacqui Lait
Preceded by Michael Portillo	Secretary of State for Defence; 1997–1999	Succeeded by Geoff Hoon
Diplomatic posts
Preceded by Javier Solana	Secretary General of NATO; 1999–2004	Succeeded by Alessandro Minuto-Rizzo; Acting
Academic offices
Preceded by Jocelyn Bell Burnell	Chancellor of the University of Dundee; 2023–present	Succeeded by Incumbent
Orders of precedence in the United Kingdom
Preceded by The Lord MacKenzie of Culkein	Gentlemen; Baron Robertson of Port Ellen	Followed by The Lord Birt
