= William Watkins =

William or Bill Watkins may refer to:

== People ==
=== Politics ===
- William H. Watkins (politician) (1827–1888), elected delegate to the Oregon Constitutional Convention
- William Henry Watkins (1862–1924), British co-operative activist
- William J. Watkins Sr. (1803–1858), Black abolitionist and educator
- William Keith Watkins (born 1951), U.S. federal judge
- William Wirt Watkins (1826–1898), Arkansas politician

=== Sports ===
- Bill Watkins (baseball) (1858–1937), Canadian baseball manager
- Walter H. Watkins (1878–1937), known as Billy, head coach of the Auburn college football program, 1900–1901
- William Richard Watkins (1904–1986), English cricketer
- Billy Watkins (rugby, born c. 1910) (c. 1910–1972), rugby union and rugby league footballer of the 1930s
- Billy Watkins (rugby union, born 1933) (1933–2013), Welsh rugby player
- William Watkins (footballer), English footballer who played for Burnley between 1898 and 1902
- Bill Watkins (cricketer, born 1923) (1923–2005), Welsh cricketer
- Bill Watkins (sport shooter) (born 1928), Welsh sport shooter

=== Other people ===
- Billy Watkins (musician) (1927–2010), gospel and song singer
- William Watkins (cleric) (fl. 1750–1762), Welsh cleric
- Bill Watkins (Seagate) (born c. 1953), CEO of Seagate Technology
- William John Watkins (born 1942), American science fiction writer and poet
- William Turner Watkins (1895–1961), American Methodist bishop
- William Watkins (entomologist) (1849–1900), English entomologist
- William Watkins (architect) (1834–1926), English architect
- William Lane Watkins (1852–1929), first black doctor to graduate from Boston University Medical School
- William Gregory Watkins (1869–1959), British architect
- W. P. Watkins (William Pascoe Watkins, 1893–1995), English co-operator and writer

== Other uses ==
- William Watkins Ltd, a tugboat owning company
- William Watkins House, historic home in Tennessee

== See also ==
- William Watkin (disambiguation)
