= List of MPs for constituencies in Scotland (1950–1951) =

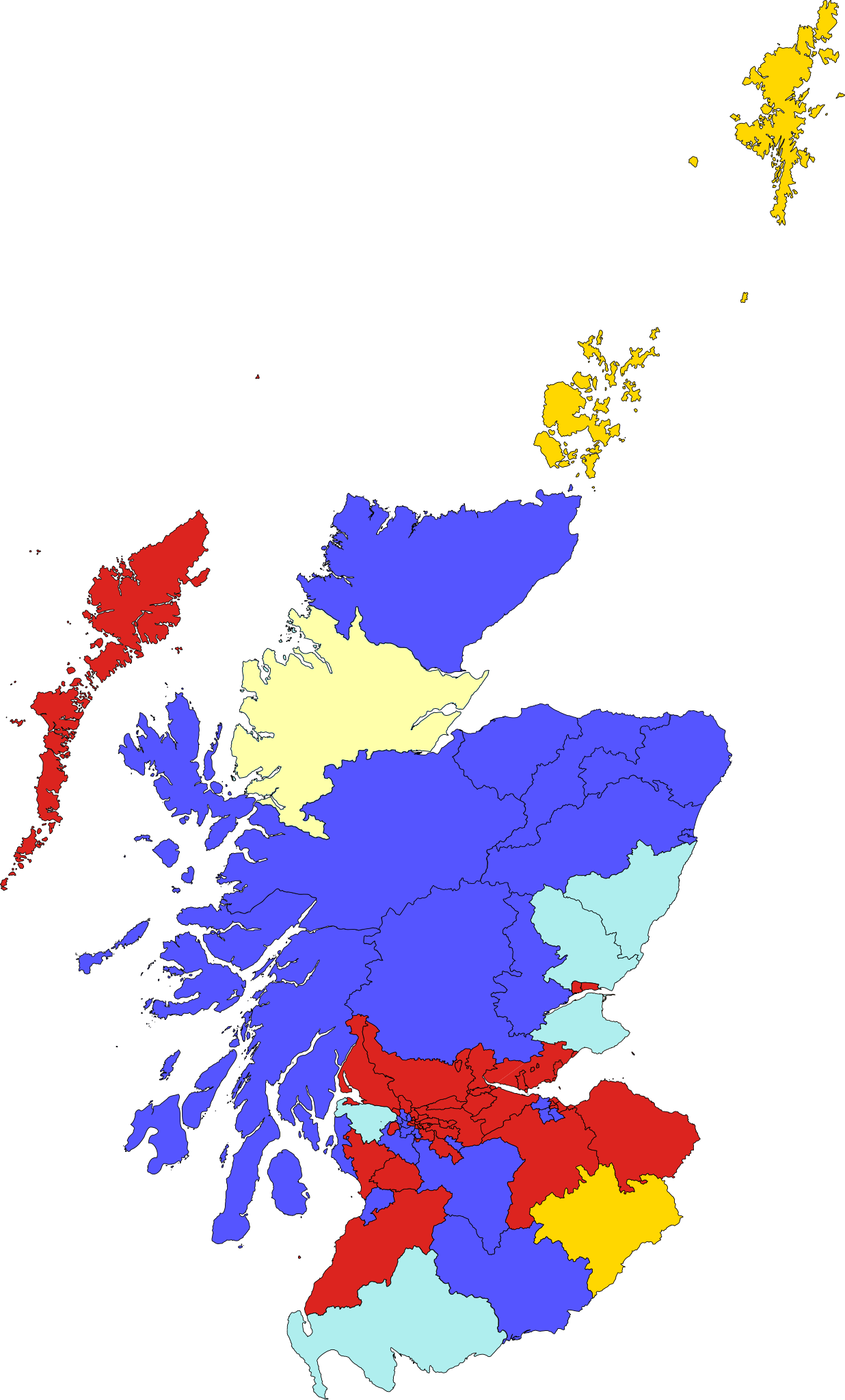
- Colours on map indicate the party allegiance of each constituency's MP.

This is a list of the 70 members of Parliament (MPs) elected to the House of Commons of the United Kingdom by Scottish constituencies for the thirty-ninth parliament of the United Kingdom (1950–1951) at the 1950 United Kingdom general election.

== Composition ==
Affiliation	Members
Scottish Labour Party	37
Unionist Party	26
National Liberal	5
Scottish Liberal Party	2
Independent Liberal	1
Total	71

== List ==
MP	Constituency	Party	In constituency since
Hector Hughes	Aberdeen North	Labour Party	1945
Priscilla Buchan	Aberdeen South	Unionist Party	1946 by-election
Robert Boothby	Aberdeenshire East	Unionist Party	1950
Henry Spence	Aberdeenshire West	Unionist Party	1950
Colin Thornton-Kemsley	Angus North and Mearns	National Liberal	1950
James Duncan	Angus South	National Liberal	1950
Duncan McCallum	Argyll	Unionist Party	1950
Thomas Moore	Ayr	Unionist Party	1950
Archie Manuel	Ayrshire Central	Labour Party	1950
Charles MacAndrew	Ayrshire North and Bute	Unionist Party	1935
Emrys Hughes	Ayrshire South	Labour Party	1946 by-election
William Duthie	Banffshire	Unionist Party	1945
John Robertson	Berwick and East Lothian	Labour Party	1950
John Timmons	Bothwell	Labour Party	1945
David Robertson	Caithness and Sutherland	Unionist Party	1950
Jean Mann	Coatbridge and Airdrie	Labour Party	1950
Niall Macpherson	Dumfriesshire	National Liberal	1945
David Kirkwood	Dunbartonshire East	Labour Party	1950
Adam McKinlay	Dunbartonshire West	Labour Party	1950
Thomas Cook	Dundee East	Labour Party	1950
John Strachey	Dundee West	Labour Party	1950
James Clunie	Dunfermline Burghs	Labour Party	1950
Andrew Gilzean	Edinburgh Central	Labour Party	1945
John Wheatley	Edinburgh East	Labour Party	1947 by-election
James Hoy	Edinburgh Leith	Labour Party	1950
James Latham Clyde	Edinburgh North	Unionist Party	1950
John Hope	Edinburgh Pentlands	Unionist Party	1950
William Darling	Edinburgh South	Unionist Party	1945
Ian Clark Hutchison	Edinburgh West	Unionist Party	1941 by-election
James Henderson-Stewart	Fife East	National Liberal	1933 by-election
Willie Hamilton	Fife West	Labour Party	1950
John Mackie	Galloway	Unionist Party	1931
James Carmichael	Glasgow Bridgeton	Labour Party	1946 by-election
William Reid	Glasgow Camlachie	Labour Party	1950
John Henderson	Glasgow Cathcart	Unionist Party	1946 by-election
James McInnes	Glasgow Central	Labour Party	1950
Alice Cullen	Glasgow Gorbals	Labour Party	1948 by-election
Jack Browne	Glasgow Govan	Unionist Party	1950
Tam Galbraith	Glasgow Hillhead	Unionist Party	1948 by-election
Walter Elliot	Glasgow Kelvingrove	Unionist Party	1950
William Hannan	Glasgow Maryhill	Labour Party	1945
Thomas Galbraith	Glasgow Pollok	Unionist Party	1940 by-election
James Hutchison	Glasgow Scotstoun	Unionist Party	1950
John McGovern	Glasgow Shettleston	Labour Party	1930 by-election
John Forman	Glasgow Springburn	Labour Party	1945
William Gordon Bennett	Glasgow Woodside	Unionist Party	1950
Hector McNeil	Greenock	Labour Party	1941 by-election
Tom Fraser	Hamilton	Labour Party	1943 by-election
Malcolm Douglas-Hamilton	Inverness	Unionist Party	1950
William Ross	Kilmarnock	Labour Party	1946 by-election
William McNair Snadden	Kinross and Western Perthshire	Unionist Party	1938 by-election
Thomas Hubbard	Kirkcaldy Burghs	Labour Party	1944 by-election
Alec Douglas-Home,	Lanark	Unionist Party	1950
Peggy Herbison	Lanarkshire North	Labour Party	1945
David Pryde	Midlothian and Peeblesshire	Labour Party	1950
James Stuart	Moray and Nairn	Unionist Party	1923
Alexander Anderson	Motherwell	Labour Party	1945
Jo Grimond	Orkney and Shetland	Liberal Party	1950
Douglas Johnston	Paisley	Labour Party	1948 by-election
Alan Gomme-Duncan	Perth and East Perthshire	Unionist Party	1950
Guy Lloyd	Renfrewshire East	Unionist Party	1940 by-election
John Maclay	Renfrewshire West	National Liberal	1950
John MacLeod	Ross and Cromarty	Independent Liberal	1945
Archie Macdonald	Roxburgh and Selkirk	Liberal Party	1950
Gilbert McAllister	Rutherglen	Labour Party	1945
Malcolm MacPherson	Stirling and Falkirk	Labour Party	1948 by-election
Arthur Woodburn	Stirlingshire East and Clackmannan	Labour Party	1939 by-election
Alfred Balfour	Stirlingshire West	Labour Party	1945
George Mathers	West Lothian	Labour Party	1950
Malcolm Macmillan	Western Isles	Labour Party	1935

== By-elections ==
There were two by-elections during this period:

- 1950 West Dunbartonshire by-election
- 1950 Glasgow Scotstoun by-election

== See also ==
- 1950 United Kingdom general election in Scotland
