= 1918 United Kingdom general election in England =

- 14 December 1918

All 492 English seats to the House of Commons
- Turnout: 55.7% (▼26.4 pp)
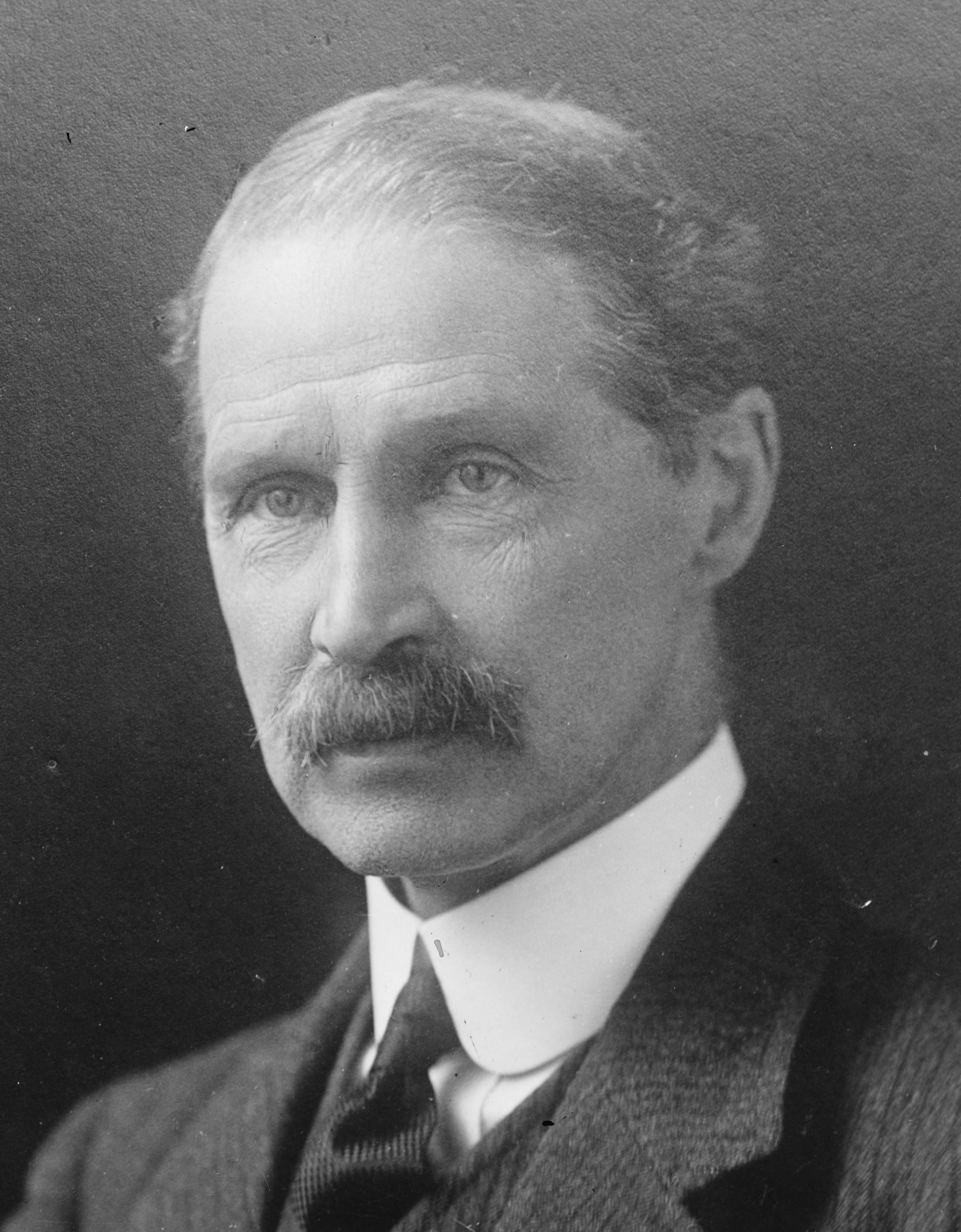

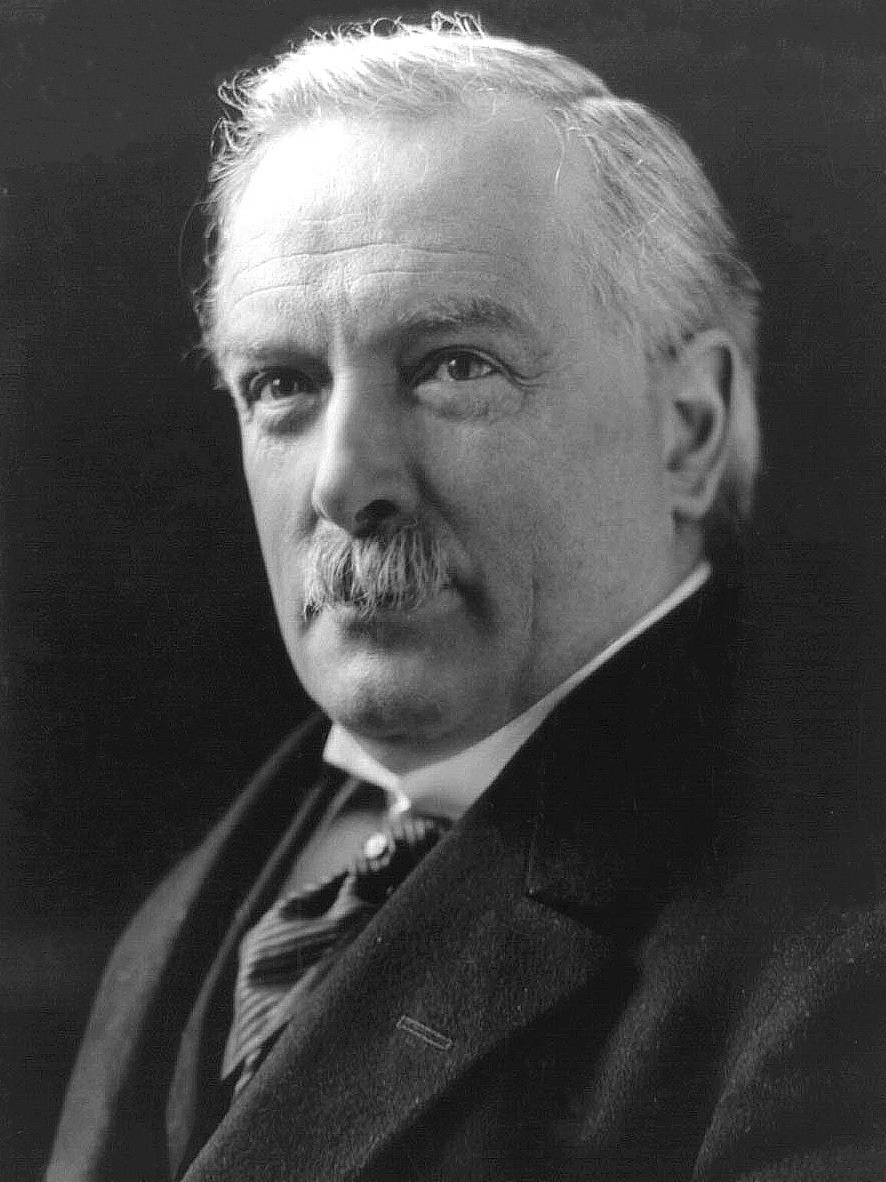

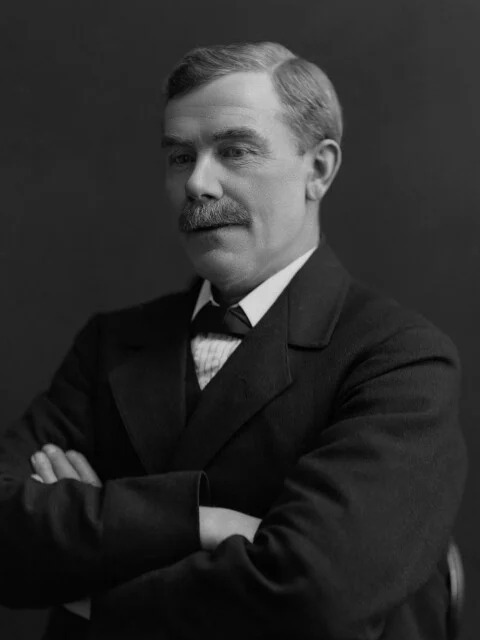

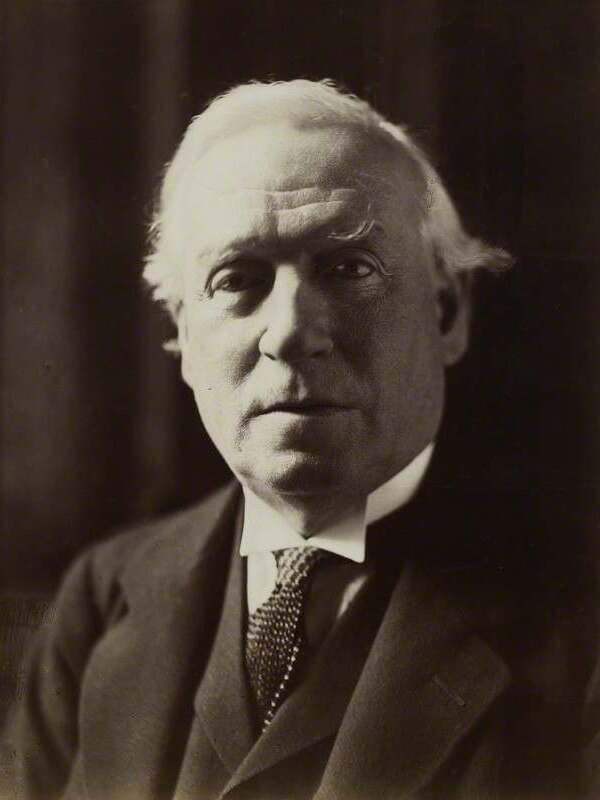
	First party	Second party	Third party
Leader	Bonar Law	David Lloyd George	William Adamson
Party	Conservative	National Liberal	Labour
Alliance	Coalition	Coalition
Leader since	13 November 1911	7 December 1916	24 October 1917
Leader's seat	Glasgow; Central	Caernarvon Boroughs	West Fife
Last election	239 seats, (Note: Combined results for county, borough and university seats.) 48.8% (Note: Combined results of the Conservative and Liberal Unionist Party in December 1910, which had since merged to the form the Conservative and Unionist party in 1912.)	Did not contest	34 seats, 6.4%
Seats won	321 (Note: Combined Coalition Conservative and non-Coalition Conservative results.) (Note: Figure includes Speaker of the House of Commons James Lowther in Penrith and Cockermouth.)	83	42
Seat change	▲82	▲83	▲8
Popular vote	3,414,631 (Note: Total and percentage votes given here are for territorial constituencies only.)	962,871	1,811,739
Percentage	42.6%	11.6%	22.6%
Swing	▼6.2 pp	New party	▲16.2 pp
	Fourth party	Fifth party
		Nat
Leader	H. H. Asquith	Henry Page Croft
Party	Liberal	National
Leader since	30 April 1908	August 1917
Leader's seat	East Fife (lost seat)	Bournemouth
Last election	186 seats, 44.4%	Did not contest
Seats won	25	2
Seat change	▼161	▲2
Popular vote	1,172,700	94,389
Percentage	14.7%	1.2%
Swing	▼29.7 pp	New party

On Wednesday 14 December 1918, the 1918 United Kingdom general election was held in England, to elect all 707 members of the House of Commons, with 492 constituencies being in England. 485 seats represented territorial constituencies contested under the first past the post electoral system, and seven additional seats represented the university constituencies. Three university constituencies returned two members through the single transferable vote electoral system and one returned one member by the first past the post system.

This was the last election in which no leaders of the major parties (Conservative, Labour or Liberal) held seats in England. Bonar Law, representing a Scottish constituency was himself born in the Colony of New Brunswick (now Canada), along with William Adamson representing a Scottish constituency and having been born in Scotland. H. H. Asquith and David Lloyd George represented Scottish and Welsh constituencies respectively, although were themselves both born in England.

The election was called immediately after the Armistice with Germany which ended the First World War, and was held on Wednesday, 14 December 1918. The governing coalition, under Prime Minister David Lloyd George, sent letters of endorsement to candidates who supported the coalition government, these being primarily Conservatives and Unionists and Coalition Liberals. These were nicknamed "Coalition Coupons", and led to the election being known as the "coupon election".

== Electoral system ==
It was the first general election to be held after enactment of the Representation of the People Act 1918. It was the first election in which all men over the age of 21 could vote with no restrictions on property ownership. By extension, it was the first election in which women over the age of 30 could vote in elections, though with some qualifications of property ownership.

Under the same Act, the number of constituencies (much like in Scotland, Ireland and Wales) was increased. Overall, England grew by 31 constituencies, going from 461 to 492. The county and borough territorial constituencies increased from the 456, used between the 1885 and December 1910 general elections, to 485. Similarly, among the university constituencies, the new Combined English Universities constituency which returned two members was added. The other University constituencies remained. London University retained its one seat under first past the post, and Cambridge University and Oxford University retained two members each, though returned members under the reformed single transferable vote system. The university constituencies therefore grew by two seats. The university constituencies would remain so until their abolition for the 1950 election.

== Candidates ==
Below is a table summarising the candidates of the 1918 general election in England, excluding those in the university constituencies.

Affiliation	Candidates
Conservative and Unionist Party	352 (Note: Includes 34 non-Coalition Conservative candidates, who did not receive Coalition Coupons.)
Labour Party	291
Liberal Party	232
Coalition Liberal	95
National Party	26
Independent NFDDSS	24
Independent Labour	18
Independent	17
Coalition National Democratic	15
Independent Unionist	10
Co-operative Party	7
Independent Liberal	7
National Democratic and Labour Party	7
NFDDSS	5
National Farmers' Union	5
Coalition Labour	4
National Socialist Party	3
Socialist Labour Party	3
British Socialist Party	2
Independent Conservative	2
Agriculturalist	2
Nationalist Party	2
Independent Progressive	2
Women's Party	1
Independent Progressive (Coalition)	1
Coalition Independent	1
Other	18 (Note: The candidates that stood are indicated in the full results table.)
Total	1,151

== Analysis ==
=== Coalition Liberals and Liberal Party ===
The newly formed Coalition Liberal Party under Prime Minister David Lloyd George won a total of 83 seats, with 82 being won in the county and borough territorial constituencies, and one seat in Cambridge University. The wins were primarily from the Liberal Party from which it had emerged. Amongst these wins, Austin Hopkinson won the seat of Mossley which replaced the seat of Prestwich. Hopkinson entered Parliament at the October 1918 Prestwich by-election, and his retention was a win from the Liberal Party. He was regarded as a Coalition Liberals due to being a supporter of Lloyd George's Government and being a recipient of a Coalition Coupon, despite him not being a member.

The Liberal Party under H. H. Asquith conversely lost several seats to the Coalition Liberals as well as the Conservative Party. The Liberals were left with 25 seats in England, the majority of the 36 seats it held at this election across the United Kingdom. The Liberals, however, win Lambeth North, Weston-super-Mare (which had replaced the abolished Somerset Northern). The party's win in Lambeth North was from the Conservative Party. It also gained the newly created seats of Portsmouth Central and Stourbridge.

=== Coalition and non-Coalition Conservatives ===
The Conservative Party won 321 seats, an increase of 83 seat when compared to the last election. The Conservative Party, which had formed in 1912 from the unification of the Conservative and Liberal Unionists won seats at the election.

Combined with the results across the United Kingdom, the party won the largest number of seats in the House of Commons despite the Coalition Government being led by Lloyd George and his Coalition Liberal Party. Amongst the candidates in the Conservative, however, 34 did not receive Coalition Coupons. 20 non-Coalition Conservatives won seats in England, with 301 being recipients of Coupons. This was an overall gain of one seat in Wales for the Conservatives combined compared with the last election. The non-Coalition Conservatives elected, along with the rest elected across the United Kingdom, did not form an opposition or bloc against the National Coalition, but were principally concerned with the issue of Irish independence.

Prominent Conservatives that entered Parliament at this election included Future Prime Minister Neville Chamberlain in Birmingham Ladywood. Although no women were elected in England at the election, at the 1919 Plymouth Sutton by-election, the first female MP to enter Parliament and take her seat at the House of Commons Nancy Astor was a member of the Conservative Party. She entered in the seat of Plymouth Sutton, and would hold it until 1945.

=== Other Coalition parties ===
Two newly formed parties were created, with many members supporting of the Coalition Government and receiving Coalition Coupons. These were National Democratic and Labour Party and Coalition Labour grouping.

Within the National Democratic and Labour Party (NDP), 15 candidates were recipients of Coupons with seven candidates standing without in England. None of the non-Coalition NDP candidates won seats. However, the Coalition NDP candidates won seven seats in England. These were the new seats of Birmingham Duddeston, Don Valley, East Ham South, Leicester West and Wallsend. It gained Bradford East from the Liberal Party, as well as Walthamstow West which had replaced the Liberal-held Walthamstow. It also won Hanley from the Labour Party, although it had been won by the Liberal Party at the 1912 Hanley by-election. Nevertheless, the gain was from the Labour Party in comparison to the last election. Combined with the party's one seat in Scotland and one seat in Wales, the party won nine seats nationally. Clement Edwards, who had won East Ham South, was elected chairman of the Party following the election.

Amongst the grouping of the Coalition Labour, three won seats in England. James Parker won the new seat of Cannock. George Roberts retained his seat in the two-member seat of Norwich, which was a gain from his former party Labour. George Wardle in Stockport won unopposed in the two-member seat, which was also a gain from his former party Labour. The grouping's fourth candidate John R. Bell who stood in Kingston upon Hull South West, and who was sponsored by the National Union of Seamen, did not win the seat against the Liberal Party. Combined with the one seat won in Scotland, the National Labour group won four seats nationally.

In addition, Douglas King, who had received a Coalition Coupon, won in North Norfolk as an independent. His win was a gain from the Liberal Party.

=== Labour Party and Co-operative Party ===
The Labour Party also gained seats at this election, with the party winning 42 seats, an increase of eight compared with the last election. Amongst its gains were Forest of Dean, Leek and Wellingborough (which replaced Northamptonshire Mid). These were gains from the Liberal Party. The Party also won Kingswinford, Wednesbury and West Bromwich from the Conservative Party.

It also won the new seat of Smethwick against Women's Party founder and candidate and Coalition Coupon recipient Christabel Pankhurst. Although a member of the Labour Party, Pankhurst had supported the Conservative Party and Prime Minister Lloyd George at the election.

The newly formed Co-operative Party candidate Alfred Waterson won the seat of Kettering. The seat had replaced North Northamptonshire which was held by the Conservatives, thereby being a gain from the Conservative Party. The party fielded a further seven candidates in England without success. Chairman of the party William Henry Watkins, although a councillor, did not stand in the election. This was the only election in which the party would stand alone, before it and its members took the Labour Whip before the next election.

=== Minor Parties and independents ===
In comparison to the previous elections in 1910, several new parties, candidates and independents, many receiving military organisation sponsorship, stood across the United Kingdom. This occurrence was primarily in England; however, such candidates saw limited success and therefore representation at Parliament.

The newly formed National Party, which had split from the Conservative Party in 1917, stood 26 candidates across England. At the election, party leader Henry Page Croft won his seat of Bournemouth, with Sir Richard Cooper winning his seat of Walsall. Both were gains from the Conservative Party. The National Party and its two MPs, however, would rejoin the Conservative Party, with the National Party being disbanded in 1921 before the new election.

The newly formed National Socialist Party candidate Jack Jones won the seat of Silvertown. Sowerby was a new seat, succeeding the abolished Labour-held seat of West Ham South.

Amongst the independents that won seats, Horatio Bottomley won Hackney South and Noel Pemberton Billing gained Hertford. Bottomley had previous held the seat of Hackney South as a member of the Liberal Party, however had resigned the seat due to bankruptcy. The Liberal Party had won 1912 Hackney South by-election. Bottomley's win was a gain from the Liberals. Additionally, Noel Pemberton Billing had won Hertford at the 1916 Hertford by-election. His retention at this election was a gain from the Conservative Party in comparison to December 1910. Billing would resign the seat, following which the 1921 Hertford by-election would occur wherein another independent would win the seat.

Other independents that won seat included Independent Unionist Robert Hewitt Barker in Sowerby with support of the National Association of Discharged Sailors and Soldiers. The gain was from the Liberal Party. Independent Liberal candidate Josiah Wedgwood in Newcastle-under-Lyme. He had received but did not accept it. He was supported by the local liberal group, however regarded himself as an independent. His switch from the Liberal Party was a gain from his former party, with Wedgwood going on to join the Labour Party following the election. However, Independent ConservativeFrancis Bennett-Goldney in Canterbury had died since the last election. The 1918 Canterbury by-election saw the Conservatives regain the seat unopposed, its retention in this election was a win from the Independent Unionist seat since last election.

Irish Nationalist, and member of the Irish Parliamentary Party, T. P. O'Connor retained Liverpool Scotland. Another candidate in Liverpool Exchange was unsuccessful.

== Seat summary ==
Below is a table summarising the total number of seats, gains and losses for each party in both the territorial county and borough constituencies and the English university constituencies.

Party	Seats				
Party	Total	Gains	Losses	Net	Of all (%)
Coalition Government (Total)	416	New		▲177	84.5
Conservative	321 (Note: Includes 20 non-Coalition Conservative MPs.)	—N/a		▲82	65.2 (Note: Includes 4.1% for non-Coalition Conservatives.)
Coalition Liberal	83	New		▲83	16.9
Coalition NDP	8	New		▲8	1.6
Coalition Labour	3	New		▲3	0.6
Coalition Independent	1	New		▲1	0.2
Labour	42	—N/a		▲8	8.5
Liberal	25	—N/a		▼161	5.1
National	2	New		▲2	0.4
Independent	2	Did not stand in Dec. 1910		▲2	0.4
Co-operative Party	1	New		▲1	0.1
Ind. Unionist	1	New		▲1	0.1
Independent Liberal	1	1	0	▲1	0.1
National Socialist	1	New		▲1	0.1
Irish Nationalist	1	0	0	Steady	0.1
Ind. Conservative	0	0	1	▼1	—
Total	74			▲31	

== County and borough results ==
Below is a table summarising the constituency results of the 1945 general election in England, excluding the result in the university constituencies.

Party	Seats					Aggregate votes		
Party	Total	Gains	Losses	Net	Of all (%)	Total	Of all (%) (Note: Adjusted for multi-member constituencies.)	Change (%)
Coalition Government (Total)	409	New		▲175	84.3	4,548,164	56.2	New
Conservative	315 (Note: Includes 20 non-Coalition Conservative MPs.)	—N/a		▲81	64.9 (Note: Includes 4.1% for non-Coalition Conservatives.)	3,414,631 (Note: Includes 317,281 for non-Coalition Conservatives.)	42.6 (Note: Includes 3.7% for non-Coalition Conservatives.)	▼6.2
Coalition Liberal	82	New		▲82	16.9	962,871	11.6	New
Coalition NDP	8	New		▲8	1.6	121,673	1.6	New
Coalition Labour	3	New		▲3	0.6	39,715	0.3	New
Coalition Independent	1	New		▲1	0.2	9,274	0.1	New
Labour	42	—N/a		▲8	8.7	1,811,739	22.6	▲16.2
Liberal	25	—N/a		▼161	5.2	1,172,700	14.7	▼29.7
National	2	New		▲2	0.4	94,389	1.2	New
Independent Labour	0	0	0	Steady	—	68,303	0.9	▲0.8
Independent NFDDSS	0	New			—	54,895	0.2	New
Independent	2	Did not stand in Dec. 1910		▲2	0.4	51,810	0.6	—N/a
Co-operative Party	1	New		▲1	0.2	37,944	0.5	New
Ind. Unionist	1	New		▲1	0.2	33,790	0.4	New
National Democratic and Labour	0	New			—	20,200	0.2	New
Independent Liberal	1	1	0	▲1	0.2	20,138	0.3	▲0.2
Farmers' Union	0	New			—	15,966	0.2	New
NFDDSS	0	New			—	12,329	0.1	New
National Socialist	1	New		▲1	0.2	11,013	0.1	New
Independent Progressive (Coalition)	0	New			—	9,862	0.1	New
Women's Party	0	New			—	8,614	0.1	New
Irish Nationalist	1	0	0	Steady	0.2	8,225	0.1	Steady
Socialist Labour	0	New			—	7,567	0.1	New
Seaman's Union	0	New			—	7,235	0.1	New
Naval and Lower-Deck	0	New			—	7,063	0.1	New
Ind. Conservative	0	0	1	▼1	—	6,425	0.1	▲0.1
National Amalgamated Union	0	New			—	5,959	0.1	New
British Socialist	0	New			—	4,643	0.1	New
Independent Northumbrian	0	New			—	4,397	0.1	New
Independent Democrat	0	New			—	4,213	0.1	New
Agriculturalist	0	New			—	3,446	0.1	New
Harrow Elector's	0	New			—	3,007	0.0	New
Carters' and Motormen's	0	New			—	2,572	0.0	New
Independent Progressive	0	New			—	2,419	0.0	New
National Amalgamated Coal Workers'	0	New			—	2,072	0.0	New
Women's Parliamentary	0	New			—	2,067	0.0	New
Independent Labour and Agriculturalist	0	New			—	1,927	0.0	New
People's Progressive	0	New			—	1,367	0.0	New
Health	0	New			—	1,127	0.0	New
Edmonton Pro-Ally & Labour	0	New			—	1,223	0.0	New
Independent Business	0	New			—	1,002	0.0	New
Whitechaple Street Sellers' and Costers'	0	New			—	614	0.0	New
Independent Silver Badge	0	New			—	452	0.0	New
Total	485			▲29	100.0	8,050,878	100.0	0.0
Registered voters, and turnout						13,998,378 (Note: Electorate in contested constituencies. The total electorate was 16,021,600.)	55.7	▼26.4

=== Popular vote ===
Parliament seats
Conservative	42.6%
Labour	22.6%
Liberal	14.7%
Coalition Liberal	11.6%
Coalition NDP	1.6%
National	1.2%
Coalition Labour	0.3%
Coalition Ind.	0.1%
Other	5.4%

Popular vote (coalitions)
Coalition	56.2%
Labour	22.6%
Liberal	14.7%
National	1.2%
Other	5.3%

=== Parliament seats ===
Parliament seats
Conservative	64.9%
Coalition Liberal	16.9%
Labour	8.7%
Liberal	5.2%
Coalition NDP	1.6%
Coalition Labour	0.6%
National	0.4%
Coalition Ind.	0.2%
Other	1.4%

Parliament seats (coalitions)
Coalition	84.3%
Labour	8.7%
Liberal	5.2%
National	0.4%
Other	1.4%

== University constituency results ==
=== University results summary ===
Below is a table summarising the seats and vote share of the English university constituencies in the 1918 general election.

Party	Seats				First preference votes	
Party	Total	Gains	Losses	Net	Total	Of all (%)
Coalition Government (Total)	7	New		▲2	12,850	63.9
Conservative	6	1	0	▲1	11,891 (Note: Includes 366 votes for non-Coalition Conservatives.)	59.1
Coalition Liberal	1	New		▲1	959	4.8
Labour	0	0	0	Steady	3,482	17.3
Independent	0	0	0	Steady	1,935	9.6
Teachers	0	New			885	4.4
Liberal	0	0	0	Steady	742	3.7
Ind. Unionist	0	0	0	Steady	210	1.0
Total	7			▲2	20,104	

=== Cambridge University ===
See also: Cambridge University (constituency)

The constituency for Cambridge University returned two Members of Parliament using the single transferable vote electoral system. The electorate consisted of graduates of the university.

General election 1918: Cambridge University (2 seats)
Party		Candidate	FPv%	Count	
Party		Candidate	FPv%	1	2
C	Coalition Unionist	John Rawlinson	35.16	2,034	
C	Coalition Unionist	Joseph Larmor	32.69	1,891	1,986
	Independent	William Cecil Dampier	21.09	1,220	1,229
	Labour	J. C. Squire	11.06	640	641
Electorate: 9,282 Valid: 5,785 Quota: 1,929 Turnout: 62.32% C indicates candidate endorsed by the coalition government.

=== Combined English Universities ===
See also: Combined English Universities

The Combined English Universities constituency, which represented effectively all red brick universities and Durham University, returned two Members of Parliament using the single transferable vote electoral system. The electorate consisted of graduates of the university.

General Election 1918: Combined English Universities (2 seats)
Party		Candidate	FPv%	Count		
Party		Candidate	FPv%	1	2	3
C	Liberal	H. A. L. Fisher	48.09	959		
C	Unionist	Martin Conway	15.20	303	465	777
	Labour	John A. Hobson	18.36	366	454	481
	Unionist	Herbert Williams	18.36	366	410	eliminated
Electorate: 2,357 Valid: 1,994 Quota: 665 Turnout: 84.60%
C indicates candidate endorsed by the coalition government.

=== London University ===
See also: London University (constituency)

The constituency for London University returned one Member of Parliament using the First-past-the-post electoral system. The electorate consisted of graduates of the university.

General election 1918: London University
Party		Candidate	Votes	%	±%
C	Unionist	Philip Magnus	2,810	41.56	−16.58
	Labour	Sidney Webb	2,141	31.67	New
	Teachers	Annesley Somerville	885	13.09	New
	Independent	Wilmot Herringham	715	10.58	New
	Ind. Unionist	Charles Louis Nordon	210	3.11	New
Majority			669	9.89	−6.39
Turnout			6,761	69.01	−4.07
Registered electors			9,797		
	Unionist hold		Swing	N/A	
C indicates candidate endorsed by the coalition government.

=== Oxford University ===
See also: Oxford University (constituency)

The constituency for Oxford University returned two Members of Parliament using the single transferable vote electoral system. The electorate consisted of graduates of the university.

General Election 1918: Oxford University (2 seats)
Party		Candidate	FPv%	Count	
Party		Candidate	FPv%	1	2
C	Unionist	Lord Hugh Cecil	49.80	2,771	
C	Unionist	Rowland Prothero	30.84	1,716	2,546
	Liberal	Gilbert Murray	13.34	742	812
	Labour	Henry Sanderson Furniss	6.02	335	351
Electorate: 7,907 Valid: 5,564 Quota: 1,855 Turnout: 70.37%
C indicates candidate endorsed by the coalition government.

== See also ==
- 1918 United Kingdom general election in Ireland
- 1918 United Kingdom general election in Scotland
- 1918 United Kingdom general election in Wales
- List of United Kingdom Parliament constituencies (1885–1918) by region
