= 1950 United Kingdom general election in England =

- 23 February 1950

All 506 English seats in the House of Commons
- Turnout: 84.4% (▲11.0 pp)
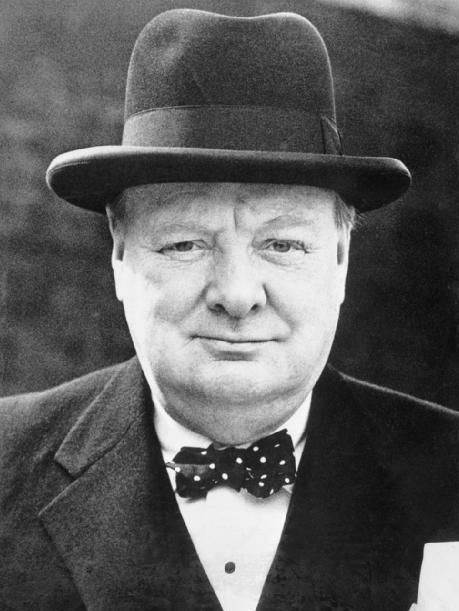

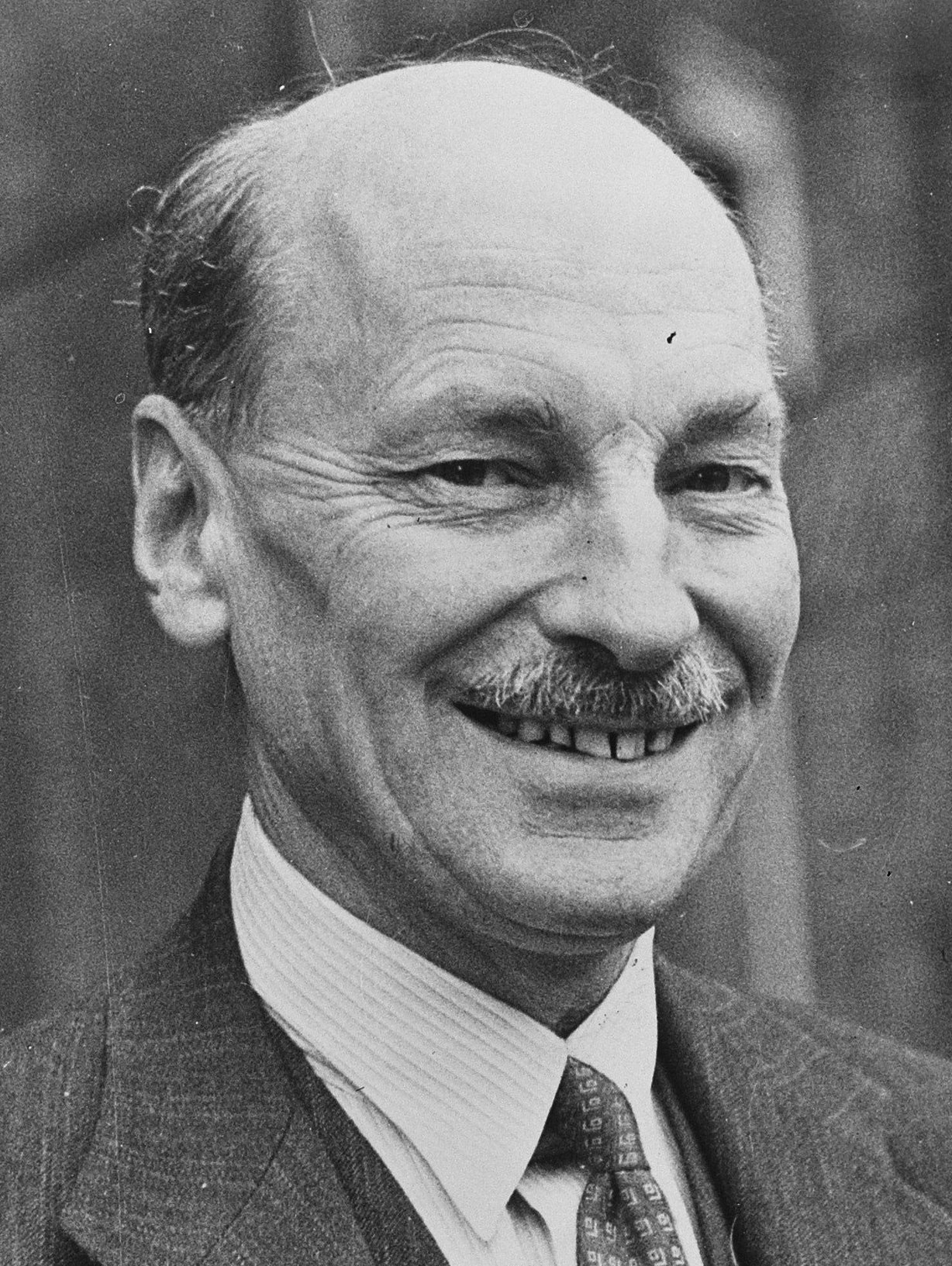

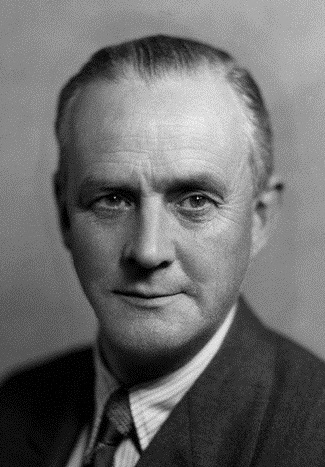
	First party	Second party	Third party
Leader	Winston Churchill	Clement Attlee	Clement Davies
Party	Conservative	Labour	Liberal
Leader since	9 October 1940	25 October 1935	2 August 1945
Leader's seat	Woodford	Walthamstow West	Montgomeryshire
Last election	167 seats, 39.7% (Note: Combined Conservative Party and National Liberal Party results in 1945, as the National Liberal Party had merged with the Conservative Party at the constituency level following the Woolton-Teviot Agreement in 1947.) (Note: Includes the 1 Conservative seat in Cambridge University.)	331 seats, 48.5%	5 seats, 9.4%
Seats won	253 (Note: Figure includes Speaker of the House of Commons Douglas Clifton Brown in Hexham.)	251	2
Seat change	▲86	▼80	▼3
Popular vote	10,499,392	11,050,966	2,248,127
Percentage	43.8%	46.1%	9.4%
Swing	▲4.1 pp	▼2.4 pp	Steady

On Thursday 23 February 1950, the 1950 United Kingdom general election was held in England, to elect all 625 members of the House of Commons, with 506 constituencies being in England.

This was also the first election to be held after a full 5-year term of a Labour government in office. The turnout registered nationally in this election remains the highest for any election in the post-war era.

== Boundary review ==
It was the first election to be held after the abolition of plural voting and university constituencies in addition to a reorganisation of constituencies by the House of Commons (Redistribution of Seats) Act 1949. Along with the Representation of the People Act 1948, the Acts brought number of constituencies in England from 517 used only for the election 1945 to 506.

The seven seats of the university constituencies used between 1918 and 1945 were abolished, with the number of county and borough constituencies reduced from 510 to 506. These boundaries, however, would be temporary use, being used only for this election and 1951, before being change for 1955 general election following the official implementation of the First periodic review of Westminster constituencies.

== Candidates ==
Below is a table summarising the candidates of the 1950 general election in England.

Affiliation	Candidates
Labour Party	505
Conservative and Unionist Party	466
Liberal Party	413
Communist Party of Great Britain	80
National Liberal Party	38
Independent	8
Labour Independent Group	5 (Note: The candidates that stood were Denis Pritt in Hammersmith North, John Platts-Mills in Shoreditch and Finsbury, Leslie Solley in Thurrock and Konni Zilliacus in Gateshead East.)
Independent Conservative	4 (Note: The candidates that stood were G. Thorley in Beverley, Daniel Lipson in Cheltenham, William Craven-Ellis in Southampton Itchen and E F St. John Lyburn in Tonbridge.)
Independent Labour Party	2 (Note: The candidates that stood were Dan Carradice in Burnley and Fred Barton in Newcastle upon Tyne Central.)
Socialist Party of Great Britain	2 (Note: The candidates that stood were Harry Young in East Ham South and Gilbert McClatchie in Paddington North.)
Irish Anti-Partition League	1 (Note: Candidate Bernard McGinnity stood in Bootle.)
Independent Liberal	1 (Note: Candidate Alexander Hancock stood in Hexham.)
Social Credit Party	1 (Note: Candidate John Hargrave stood in Hackney North and Stoke Newington.)
Christian Democrat	1 (Note: Candidate G. W. Dickinson stood in West Ham North.)
Independent Labour	1 (Note: Candidate A.G. Cleather stood in Liverpool Exchange.)
Total	1,528

== Analysis ==
While the Labour Party registered a narrow majority of 5 seats in the House of Commons, the Conservative Party won 2 seats more than Labour in England (a phenomenon which has since occurred only in 1964). However, in terms of the voteshare, Labour led by nearly 2.5% in England. The wafer-thin majority of the Labour government meant that another election had to be called in October 1951 in which the Conservatives won a narrow majority in the Commons as well as in England, despite Labour winning its highest ever share of the vote (and total raw votes).

The seat count for the Labour Party reduced from its majority of English seats of 331 to 251, a decrease of 80 seats with a minor decrease in its vote share.

=== Conservatives and National Liberals ===
Following the result in England, the Conservative Party, which was now in a constituency alliance with the National Liberal Party won an overall 253 seats in England. 243 seats were won by the Conservatives. Prominent Conservative Parliamentarians that entered Parliament in this election included Edward Heath in Bexley, Enoch Powell in Wolverhampton South West, Iain Macleod in Enfield West, and Reginald Maudling in Barnet. Overall, the party increased its seat count from 159 to 253, an increase of 84 amongst the new county and borough constituencies.

However, amongst the abolition of the University constituencies across England and the United Kingdom, the Conservatives lost its single English university seat in Cambridge University. However, Kenneth Pickthorn, the sitting Conservative MP of that seat won the new seat of Carlton.

Of the 253 seats, 10 were won by the National Liberals. The National Liberal Party held St Ives with Greville Howard winning the seat after the retirement of Alec Beechman. The Party won Torrington, which was a seat which replaced the National Liberal-held South Molton and Conservative-held Barnstaple. This was a hold from South Molton, with the Conservatives taking North Devon, which had also succeeded these two seats after the redistribution. Sitting National MP Frank Medlicott won the new seat of Central Norfolk which replaced parts of three seats, including his own seat of East Norfolk. The party also held Huntingdonshire and Harwich, Holland with Boston and Sheffield Hallam. However, the National Liberals also won seats in England. It won Luton from the Labour Party under the constituency's new boundaries, with Charles Hill entering Parliament. Sir William Taylor also won Bradford North from the Labour Party. It also won the new seat of Sheffield Heeley, which was created from seats held by other parties. The National Liberals therefore increased its seat count by three from 7 seats in England to 10 in total.

Between the constituency alliance between the Conservative Party and National Liberal Party, the alliance saw an increase of 87 seats, winning a total of 253 and were placed as the largest party by way of seats in England.

=== Liberal Party ===
The Liberal Party saw yet further losses in England since the last election. The Liberals won the new seat of Huddersfield West, with candidate Donald Wade taking the seat. He would hold it until 1964. Edgar Granville also held Eye.

However, the party lost North Dorset wherein Conservative candidate Robert Crouch entering Parliament. The Liberals also lost the abolished seat of Buckrose, with the Conservative Party winning the succeeding seats of Bridlington and Beverley. It lost the seat of North Cornwall to the Conservatives, with Harold Roper entering Parliament. Finally, the Liberal Party lost North Cumberland due to the redistribution by Penrith and The Border which was won by the Conservatives.

As such, with the party gaining one seat and losing four, the total number of Liberal MPs in England reduced from five to two.

=== Minor Parties and independents ===
Amongst the sitting members of Parliament not belonging to major parties, all lost their seats. Although the Communist Party of Great Britain stood 80 candidates in England (an increase of the 15 that stood in 1945), the party's vote share dropped, with England's last ever Communist MP lost Phil Piratin, with his constituency Mile End being abolished. The replacement seat Stepney was won by Labour candidate Stoker Edwards.

The Independent Labour candidate Denis Pritt, chairman of the short-lived Labour Independent Group, lost Hammersmith North to Labour candidate Frank Tomney. The four other Independent labour Group candidates were also unsuccessful. Vernon Bartlett in Bridgwater, who had initially won as a candidate for the short-lived minor Common Wealth Party, retired from Parliament. Ernest Millington, who had won as an Independent Progressive group's candidate in Chelmsford, joined the Labour Party in 1946. He ran in the seat, however it was won by Conservative Hubert Ashton.

The two independents that had won or retained seats in the last election lost their seats. Denis Kendall lost Grantham, standing again in the seat but coming third in the seat behind the Conservatives and Labour. This was a gain for the Conservative Party. William Brown lost the seat of Rugby, also coming third. This was a gain for the Labour Party. Andrew Duncan did not re-contest, with his seat of City of London being abolished. The seat which replaced this constituency was Cities of London and Westminster, which was won by the Conservatives. National Independent MP Daniel Lipson in Cheltenham lost his seat to the Conservative Party, though stood as an Independent Conservative candidate at this election.

=== University constituencies ===
Amongst the abolished university constituencies, and aside the one Conservative loss, five Independents lost their seats, along with National Independent Ernest Graham-Little. Graham-Little, who had held the London University constituency, retired from Parliament at this election. Independent Kenneth Lindsay also retired from Parliament following this election, with Eleanor Rathbone having died since the last election. Also retiring were Wilson Harris in Cambridge University, along with Arthur Salter and A. P. Herbert in Oxford University.

== Results ==
Party	Seats					Aggregate votes		
Party	Total	Gains	Losses	Net	Of all (%)	Total	Of all (%)	Change (%)
Labour	251	—N/a		▼80	49.6	11,050,966	46.1	▼2.4
Conservative (Total)	253	—N/a		▲87	50.0	10,499,392	43.8	▲4.1
Conservative	243	—N/a		▲84	48.0	9,820,068	41.0	▲4.0
National Liberal	10	3	0	▲3	2.0	679,324	2.8	▲0.1
Liberal	2	1	4	▼3	0.4	2,248,127	9.4	Steady
Communist	0	0	1	▼1	—	55,158	0.2	▼0.1
Independent	0	0	2	▼2	—	52,866	0.2	▼0.2
Labour Independent	0	New			—	26,014	0.1	New
Ind. Conservative	0	0	0	Steady	—	13,689	0.1	▲0.1
Independent Liberal	0	0	0	Steady	—	4,154	0.0	Steady
Ind. Labour Party	0	0	0	Steady	—	1,107	0.0	Steady
Anti-Partition	0	New			—	1,092	0.0	New
Social Credit	0	Did not stand in 1945			—	551	0.0	—N/a
Christian Democrat	0	New			—	503	0.0	New
Socialist (GB)	0	0	0	Steady	—	448	0.0	Steady
Independent Labour	0	0	1	▼1	—	381	0.0	▼0.1
Other non-contested	0	—N/a		▼4 (Note: Includes 1 National Independent MP Daniel Lipson in Cheltenham, though he stood as an Independent Conservative candidate; 1 National MP Andrew Duncan in City of London; 1 Independent Progressive MP Vernon Bartlett in Bridgwater; and 1 Common Wealth Party MP Vernon Bartlett in Chelmsford, though he stood as a Labour candidate.)	—	0	0.0	—N/a
Total	506			▼4	100.0	23,954,448	100.0	0.0
Registered voters, and turnout						28,374,288 (Note: Electorate in contested constituencies, which was all seats in this election.)	84.4	▲11.0

Popular vote
Labour	46.13%
Conservative	43.84%
Liberal	9.39%
Other	0.7%

Parliamentary seats
Conservative	50.00%
Labour	49.60%
Liberal	0.40%

== See also ==
- 1950 United Kingdom general election in Scotland
- 1950 United Kingdom general election in Wales
- 1950 United Kingdom general election in Northern Ireland
