= 1950 United Kingdom general election in Northern Ireland =

- 23 February 1950

All 12 Northern Ireland seats in the House of Commons
- Turnout: 77.4% (▲10.0 pp)
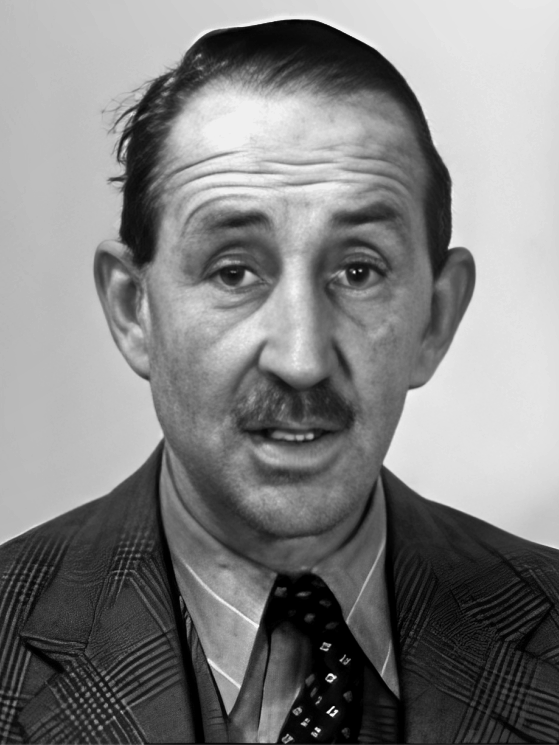
	First party	Second party
		Nat
Leader	Sir Basil Brooke, Bt	James McSparran
Party	UUP	Nationalist
Alliance	Conservative
Leader since	1943	1945
Leader's seat	Did not stand	Did not stand (Note: McSparran sat as the MP for Mourne in the Northern Ireland Parliament.)
Last election	9 seats, 53.7%	2 seats, 18.8%
Seats won	10 (Note: Includes 2 members elected unopposed.)	2
Seat change	▲1	Steady
Popular vote	352,334 (Note: Voting took place in 10 of 12 seats. The other MPs were unopposed.)	65,211
Percentage	62.8%	11.6%
Swing	▲9.1 pp	▼7.2 pp

On 23 February 1950, the 1950 United Kingdom general election was held in Northern Ireland, to elect all 625 members of the House of Commons, including the 12 Northern Ireland seats.

The Representation of the People Act 1948 reorganised constituencies. As a result of the Act, all Members of Parliament, including those in Northern Ireland, were to only be elected single-seat constituencies using first-past-the-post voting, ending the two-seat constituencies which had been in place till then. The university constituency of Queen's University of Belfast was also abolished.

In the election as a whole, the Labour Party led by Clement Attlee as Prime Minister was returned with a narrow majority, while the Conservative Party, which included the Ulster Unionists, led by Sir Winston Churchill, continued in opposition.

== Candidates ==
Below is a table summarising the candidates of the 1950 general election in Northern Ireland.

Affiliation	Candidates
Ulster Unionist Party	12
Northern Ireland Labour Party	5
Irish Labour	2
Nationalist Party	2
Sinn Féin	2
Total	23

== Results ==
Party	Seats					Aggregate votes		
Party	Total	Gains	Losses	Net	Of all (%)	Total	Of all (%)	Change (%)
UUP	10	2	1	▲1	83.3	352,334	62.8	▲9.1
NI Labour	0	0	0	Steady	—	67,816	12.1	▲0.7
Nationalist	2	0	0	Steady	16.7	65,211	11.6	▼7.2
Labour	0	New			—	52,715	9.4	New
Sinn Féin	0	Did not stand in 1945			—	23,362	4.2	—N/a
Other non-contested	0	—N/a		▼2	—	0	0.0	—N/a
Total	12			▼1	100.0	561,438	100.0	0.0
Registered voters, and turnout						724,920 (Note: Electorate in contested constituencies. The total electorate was 865,421.)	67.4	▲10.0

Popular vote
UUP	62.8%
NI Labour	12.1%
National	11.6%
Irish Labour	9.4%
Sinn Féin	4.2%

Parliamentary seats
UUP	83.3%
National	16.7%

== MPs elected ==
Constituency	Party	MP
Antrim North	UUP	Hugh O'Neill
Antrim South	UUP	Douglas Savory
Armagh	UUP	Richard Harden
Belfast East	UUP	Alan McKibbin
Belfast North	UUP	H. Montgomery Hyde
Belfast South	UUP	Conolly Gage
Belfast West	UUP	J. G. MacManaway
Down North	UUP	Walter Smiles
Down South	UUP	Lawrence Orr
Fermanagh and South Tyrone	Nationalist	Cahir Healy
Londonderry	UUP	Sir Ronald Ross, Bt
Mid Ulster	Nationalist	Anthony Mulvey

== See also ==
- 1950 United Kingdom general election in England
- 1950 United Kingdom general election in Scotland
- 1950 United Kingdom general election in Wales
