= 1950 United Kingdom general election in Scotland =

- 23 February 1950

All 71 Scottish seats to the House of Commons
- Turnout: 80.9% (▲11.9 pp)
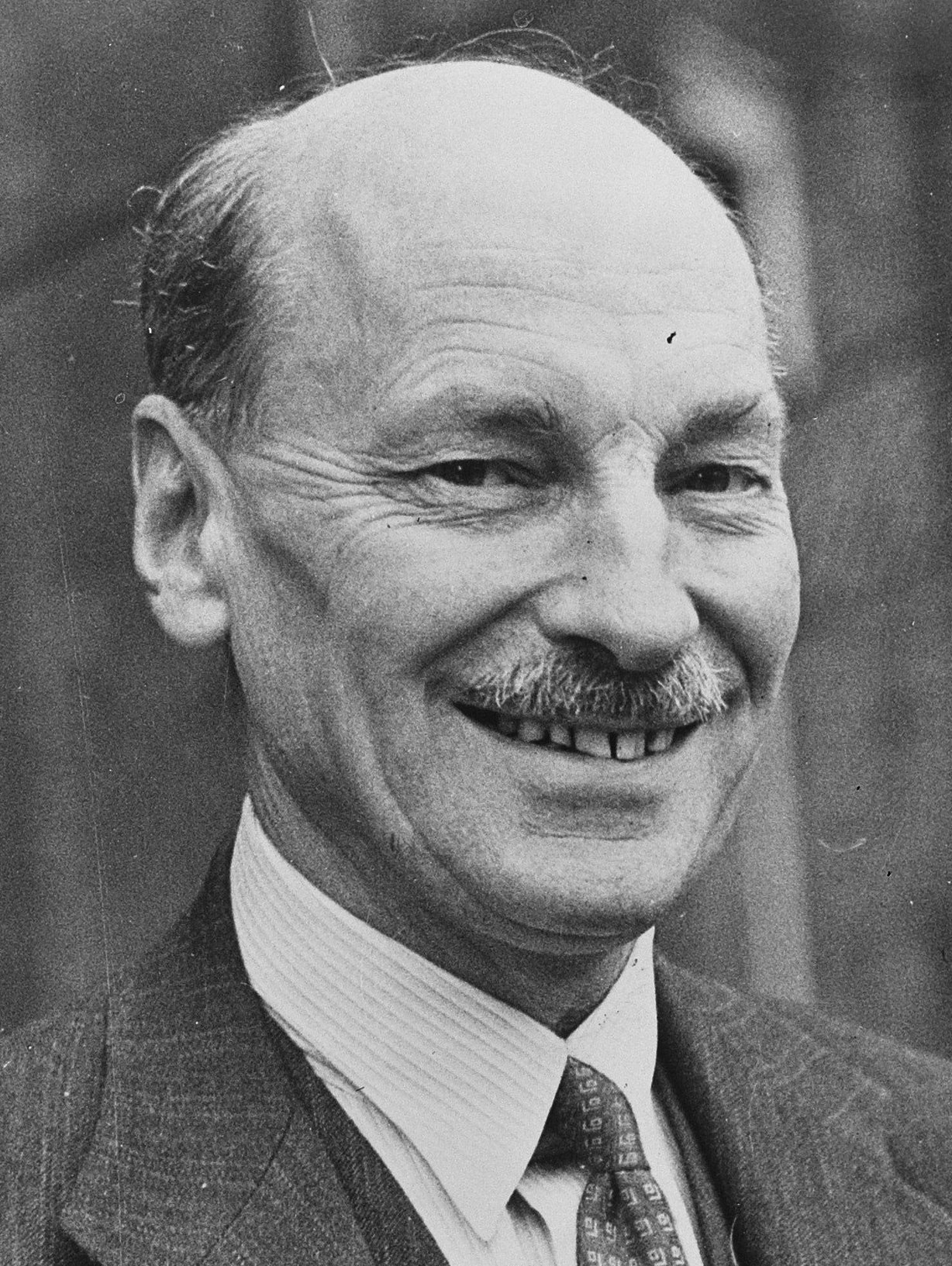

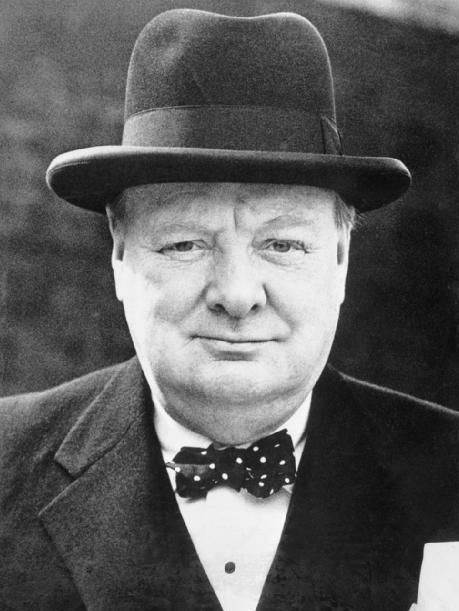

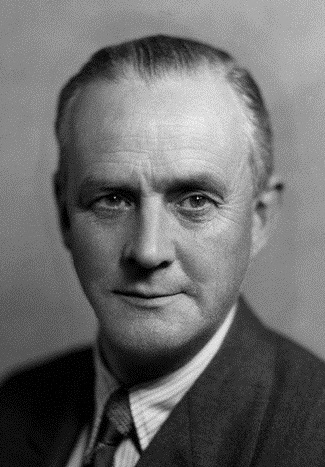
	First party	Second party	Third party
Leader	Clement Attlee	Winston Churchill	Clement Davies
Party	Labour	Unionist	Liberal
Alliance		Conservative	Liberal
Leader since	25 October 1935	9 October 1940	2 August 1945
Leader's seat	Walthamstow West	Woodford	Montgomeryshire
Last election	37 seats, 47.9%	28 seats, (Note: Includes 1 Unionist seat in the abolished Combined Scottish Universities constituency.) 40.3%	0 seats, 5.6%
Seats won	37	31 (Note: The seat and vote count figures for the Unionists given here include the National Liberals.)	2
Seat change	Steady	▲3	▲2
Popular vote	1,259,410	1,222,010	180,270
Percentage	46.2%	44.8%	6.6%
Swing	▼1.7 pp	▲4.5 pp	▲1.0 pp
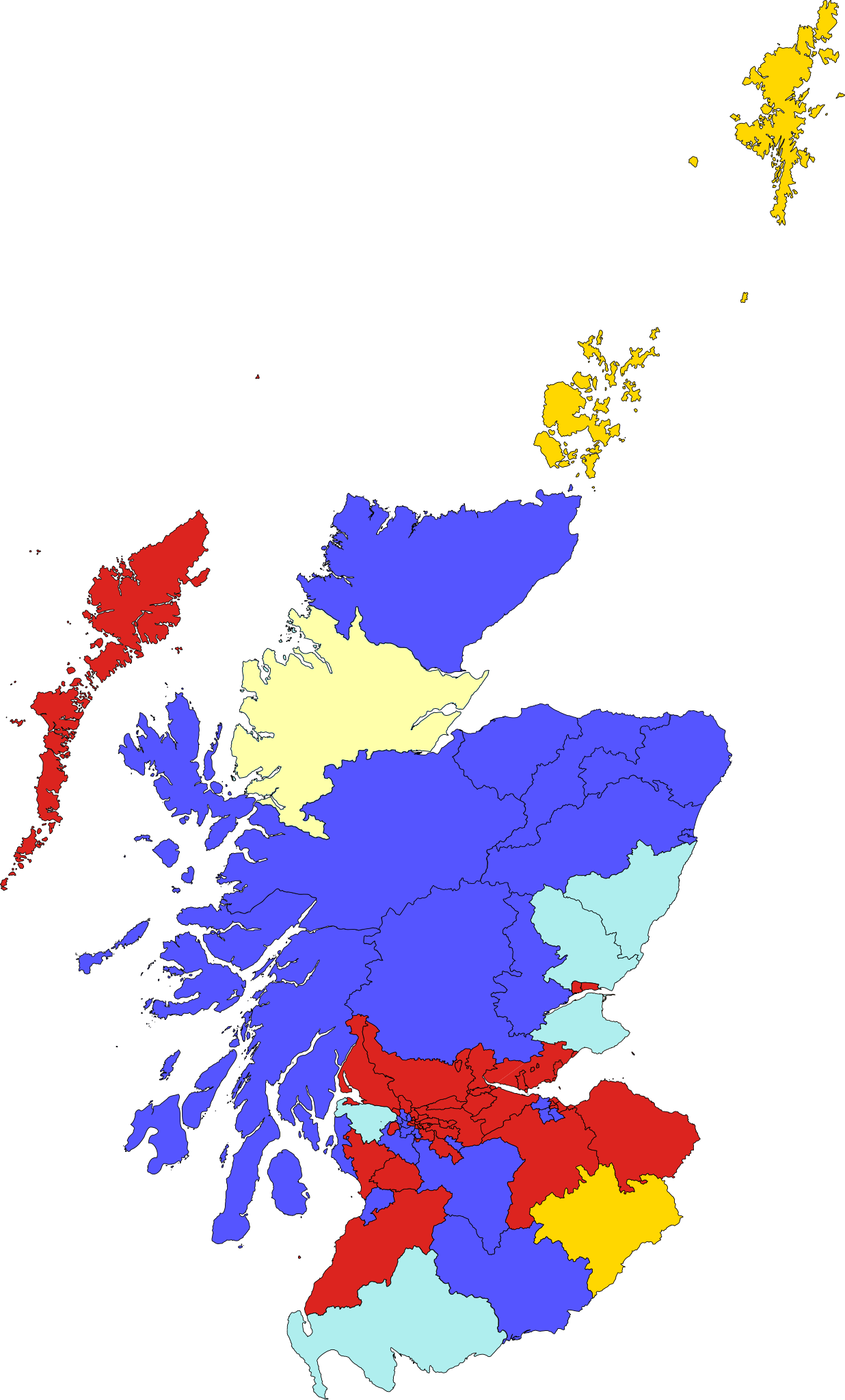

On 23 February 1950, the 1950 United Kingdom general election was held in Scotland, to elect all 625 members of the House of Commons, with 71 constituencies being in Scotland.

This was also the first election to be held after a full 5-year term of a Labour government in office. The turnout registered nationally in this election remains the highest for any election in the post-war era.

== Boundary review ==
Prior to the election, the Representation of the People Act 1948 and House of Commons (Redistribution of Seats) Act 1949 passed. These Acts removed plurality voting and redistributed the seats in Scotland to the House of Commons that had been in use between the 1918 to 1945 general elections.

The Combined Scottish Universities constituency was abolished, and the number of territorial county and borough constituencies remained unchanged but with boundary changes. Dundee, Scotland's only multi-member plurality seat, was also split between Dundee East and Dundee West. This arrangement of boundaries in Scotland, however, was temporary and would be changed again in 1955 following the official implementation of the First periodic review of Westminster constituencies.

== Candidates ==
Below is a table summarising the candidates of the 1950 general election in Scotland.

Affiliation	Candidates
Labour Party	71
Unionist Party	57
Liberal Party	41
Communist Party of Great Britain	16
National Liberal Party	11
Scottish National Party	3
Irish Anti-Partition League	3
Independent Labour Party	2 (Note: The candidates that stood were Robert Duncan in Glasgow Bridgeton and James W. Graham in Glasgow Shettleston.)
Scottish Home Rule	2 (Note: The candidates that stood were M S McP Holt in Argyllshire and David Murray in Western Isles.)
Independent Liberal	1 (Note: Candidate John MacLeod stood in Ross and Cromarty.)
Scottish Self-Government	1 (Note: Candidate Maxwell Hynd stood in West Lothian.)
Independent Labour	1 (Note: Candidate John S. Thomson stood in Greenock.)
Independent	1 (Note: Candidate Hugh MacDiarmid stood in Glasgow Kelvingrove.)
United Socialist Movement	1 (Note: Founder and Leader of the United Socialist Movement Guy Aldred stood in Glasgow Central.)
Independent Scottish Nationalist	1 (Note: Candidate Hume Sleigh stood in Edinburgh Central.)
Total	212

== Analysis ==
=== Labour Party ===
The Labour Party won a plurality of votes and a majority of seats within Scotland. When combined with results from across the UK the Labour government of Clement Attlee was returned to power with a slim majority of only 5. This proved unworkable, and a further election was held the following year. In Scotland, the Labour party had no overall change in terms of seats.

Labour gained Glasgow Camlachie, Glasgow Bridgeton and Glasgow Shettleston from the Independent Labour Party. As a result, the Independent Labour Party held no seats in Scotland, and would never do so again. In Glasgow Camlachie, the sitting Independent Labour Party MP, Campbell Stephen, died causing the 1948 Glasgow Camlachie by-election wherein the Unionist Party candidate Charles McFarlane won the seat. However, in this election, Labour candidate William Reid won the seat from the Unionists. He would remain in Parliament until his retirement in 1964. Similarly, in Glasgow Bridgeton, sitting Member of Parliament and Leader of the Independent Labour Party James Maxton died, causing the 1946 Glasgow Bridgeton by-election wherein Independent Labour Party candidate James Carmichael won the seat. This was the last victory for an ILP candidate in Scotland and the United Kingdom as a whole; however, Carmichael stood as an official Labour candidate in this election, retaining the seat. This was a gain from the ILP. Lastly, John McGovern in Glasgow Shettleston, who had been an ILP Member of Parliament, had resigned from the party following the death of Maxton, and rejoined the Labour Party. His re-election was also a gain from the ILP for the Labour Party.

The Labour Party also gained West Fife from the Communist Party of Great Britain. Long-time Communist MP, Willie Gallacher, lost his seat to Labour's Willie Hamilton. This was the last time in which the Communists would hold a seat in Scotland in Westminster, and following the defeat of another communist in England, the last time the party would hold seats in the United Kingdom at all.

The Labour Party also won Glasgow Central from the Unionist Party. It also won the new seat of Central Ayrshire.

However, the Labour party also lost six seats to the Unionist Party and National Liberals in Scotland, including the abolished Glasgow St Rollox. William Leonard, the sitting MP for St Rollox, contested the new seat of Glasgow Woodside, though lost to the Unionist Party. Labour came out with no change in terms of seats, although with a minor decrease in vote share.

=== Unionist Party and National Liberals ===
The Unionist Party, which had a national affiliation with the Conservative Party, along with the national constituency alliance with the renamed National Liberal Party gained an overall of four seats at this election.

The Unionist Party won Edinburgh North, Glasgow Govan, Lanark and Glasgow Kelvingrove from Labour. In the seat of Lanark, future Prime Minister Alec Douglas-Home returned to Parliament after having held the seat from 1929 and losing it in 1945. In Glasgow Kelvingrove, long-time MP Walter Elliot also returned to Parliament.

The Party also won the new seat of Glasgow Scotstoun wherein Sir Arthur Young won the seat after having represented the abolished Glasgow Partick since 1935. He would hold the seat until his death, following which the Unionist Party would retain the seat at the 1950 Glasgow Scotstoun by-election. The Unionist won the new seat of Glasgow Woodside. John Mackie in Galloway, who had won the seat in the previous election as an Independent Unionist, won the seat again as an official Unionist candidate. The retention represented a gain for the Unionist Party. The Unionists won Inverness, which was a gain from Independent Liberal Murdoch Macdonald. Macdonald did not re-contest the seat at this election.

However, the Unionists also lost six seats. Amongst some losses to Labour, it also lost two seats to the Liberal Party as well as losing the abolished seat of Forfarshire and two seats to its constituency ally, the National Liberal Party. The Unionist Party, therefore, gained an overall two seats at this election.

The National Liberal Party held Dumfriesshire, and held East Fife, with the MP being the former Chair of the National Liberal Party James Henderson-Stewart. It gained the new seat of South Angus, which replaced Montrose Burghs and Forfarshire. It also won the new seat of North Angus and Mearns, which had also partly replaced Montrose Burghs and some rearranged borders in Aberdeenshire and Kincardineshire. The chairman of the National Liberals, John Maclay, won West Renfrewshire from the Labour Party, after having represented the abolished Montrose Burghs. Overall, the party gained two seats in Scotland in comparison to the last election.

=== Liberal Party and Independent Liberal ===
The Liberals gained two seats in Scotland, having been unrepresented north of the border in the previous parliament. It regained Roxburgh and Selkirk and Orkney and Shetland from the Unionist Party, after having lost these seats in 1945 to the party. Future Leader of the Liberal Party Jo Grimond entered Parliament in Orkney and Shetland, and would hold the seat until 1983.

Independent Liberal John MacLeod was returned in Ross and Cromarty, although would join the National Liberals and Unionists before the 1951 general election.

=== Combined Scottish Universities ===
Following the boundaries reviews and abolition of the plurality voting constituencies, the non-territorial Combined Scottish Universities constituency was abolished. As such, the Unionist Party lost its single seat in the constituency, with MP John Graham Kerr not contesting any seat at the election. Similarly, John Anderson, who had won a seat as a National MP in support of the National Government since 1938 and Churchill Caretaker Ministry in 1945, left Parliament and did not re-contest any seat. Independent John Boyd Orr also left Parliament, and did not re-contest any seat.

== Results ==
Party	Seats					Aggregate votes		
Party	Total	Gains	Losses	Net	Of total (%)	Total	Of total (%)	Change (%)
Labour Party	37	6	6	Steady	52.1	1,259,410	46.2	▼1.7
Unionist (Total)	31	10	6	▲4	43.7	1,222,010	44.8	▲4.5
Unionist	26	8	6	▲2	36.6	1,013,909	37.2	▲0.5
National Liberal	5	2	0	▲2	7.0	208,101	7.6	▲4.0
Liberal	2	2	0	▲2	2.8	180,270	6.6	▲1.0
Communist	0	0	1	▼1	—	27,559	1.0	▼0.4
Independent Liberal	1 (Note: John MacLeod in Ross and Cromarty.)	0	1	▼1	1.4	10,912	0.4	▼0.5
SNP	0	0	0	Steady	—	9,708	0.4	▼0.9
Independent Labour	0	Did not stand in 1945			—	6,458	0.2	—N/a
Anti-Partition	0	New			—	3,992	0.2	New
Independent Labour Party	0	0	3	▼3	—	3,005	0.1	▼1.6
Self-Government	0	New			—	1,039	0.0	New
Home Rule	0	New			—	915	0.0	New
Independent	0	0	0	Steady	—	639	0.0	Steady
United Socialist Movement	0	0	0	Steady	—	485	0.0	Steady
Independent Scottish Nationalist	0	0	0	Steady	—	283	0.0	Steady
Other non-contested	0	—N/a		▼1 (Note: John Mackie retained Galloway, though stood as an official candidate for the Unionist Party.)	—	0	0.0	—N/a
Total	71			Steady	100.0	2,726,684	100.0	0.0
Registered voters, and turnout						3,370,190 (Note: Electorate in contested constituencies, which was all seats in this election.)	80.9	▲11.9

Popular vote
Labour	46.2%
Unionist	44.8%
Liberal	6.6%
Liberal	1.0%
Other	1.4%

Parliamentary seats
Labour	52.1%
Unionist	43.7%
Liberal	2.8%
Ind. Liberal	1.4%

== See also ==
- 1950 United Kingdom general election in England
- 1950 United Kingdom general election in Wales
- 1950 United Kingdom general election in Northern Ireland
- List of MPs for constituencies in Scotland (1950–1951)
