= 1918 United Kingdom general election in Scotland =

- 14 December 1918

All 74 Scottish seats to the House of Commons
- Turnout: 55.1% (▼26.7 pp)
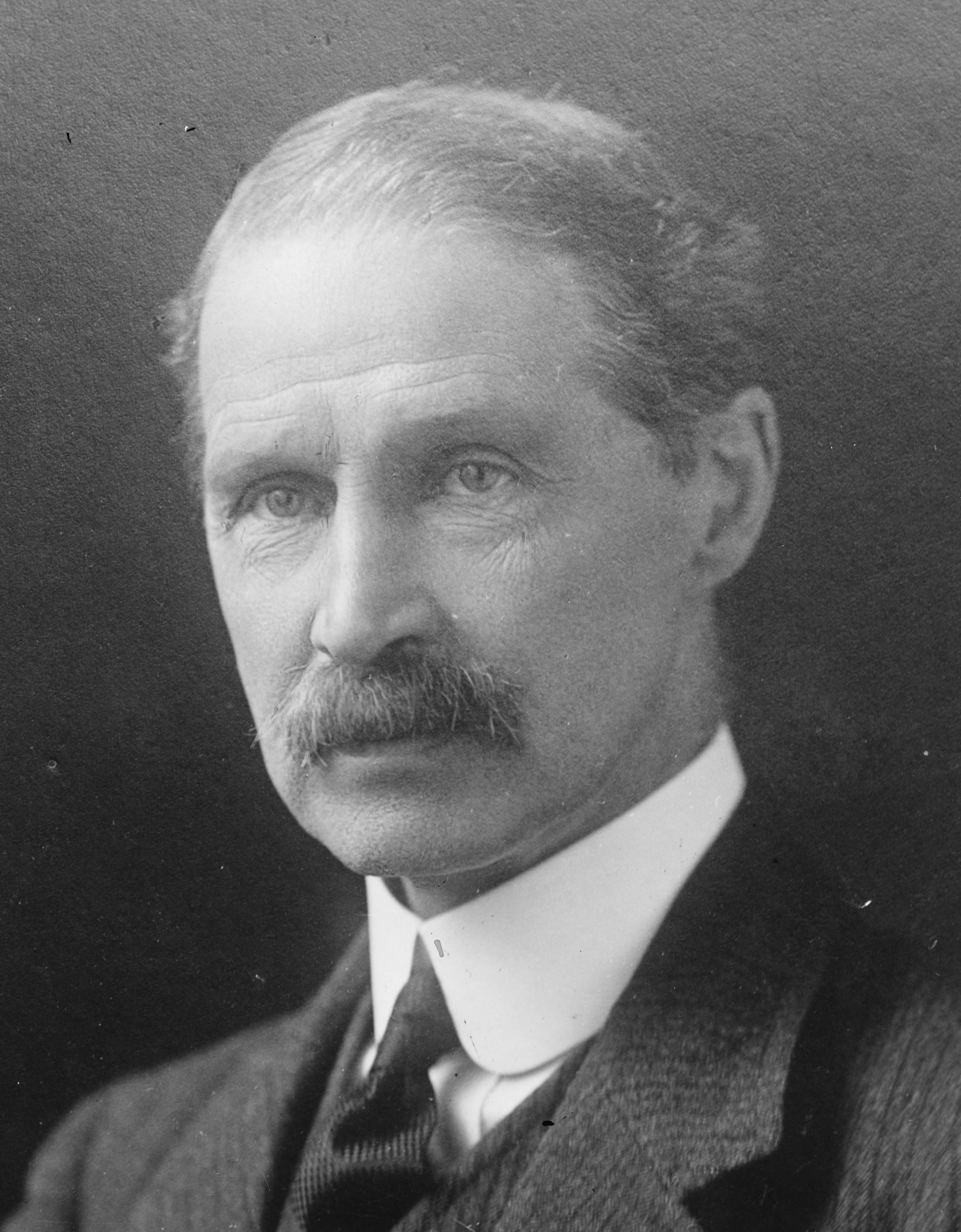

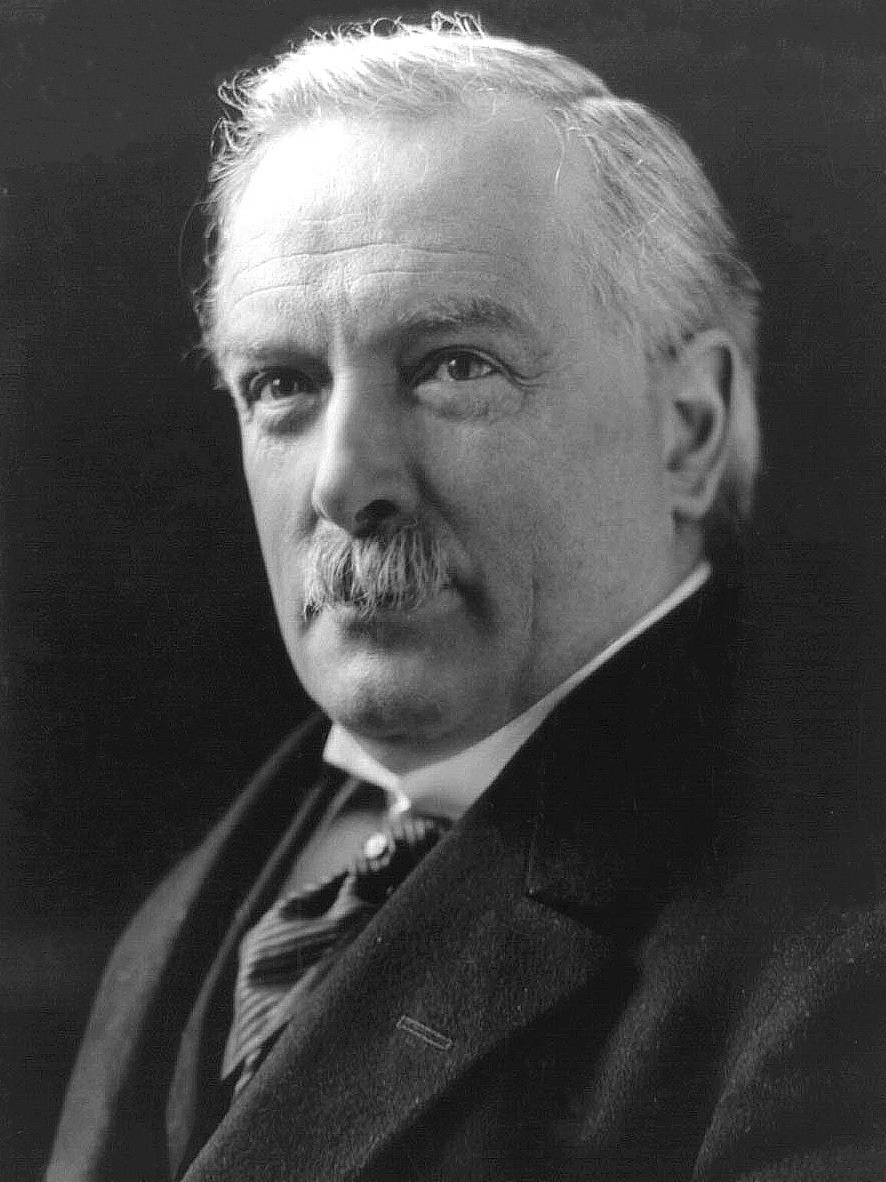

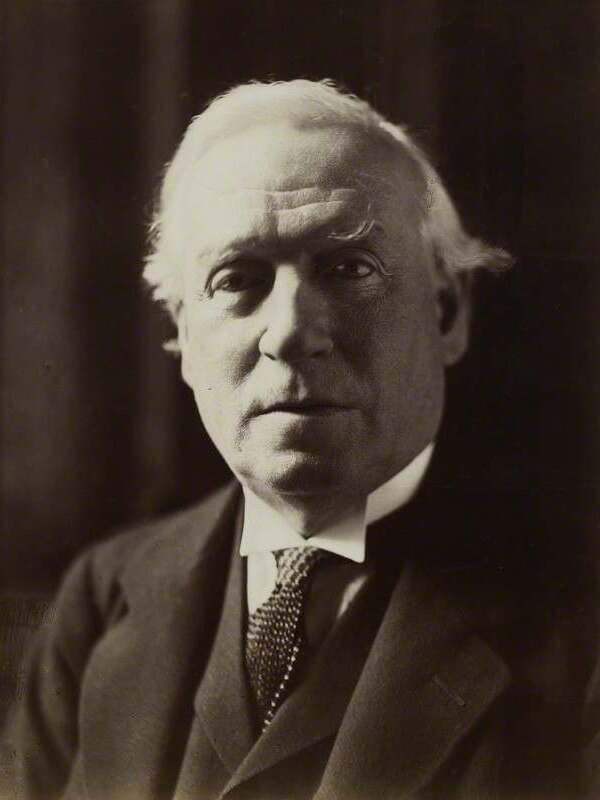

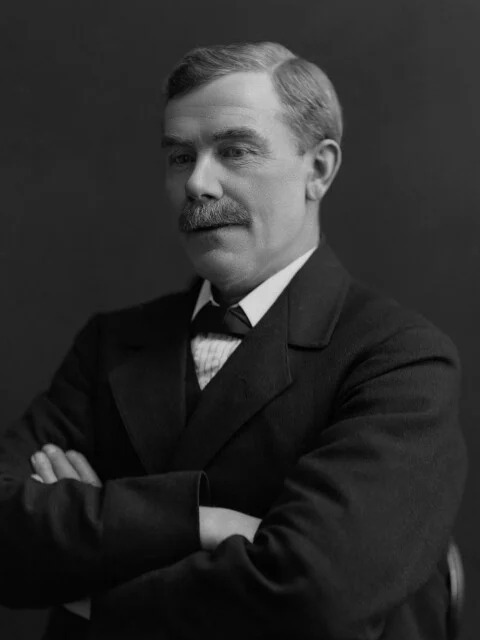
	First party	Second party
Leader	Bonar Law	David Lloyd George
Party	Unionist	Coalition Liberal
Alliance	Conservative & Coalition	Coalition
Leader since	13 November 1911	7 December 1916
Leader's seat	Glasgow Central	Caernarfon Boroughs
Last election	11 seats, (Note: Combined results for burgh, county and university seats) 42.6% (Note: Combined results of the Conservative and Liberal Unionist Party in December 1910, which had since merged to the form the Conservative and Unionist party in 1912.)	Did not contest
Seats won	32 (Note: Includes 2 non-Coalition Unionist MPs.)	26
Seat change	▲21	▲26
Popular vote	358,469 (Note: Total and percentage votes given here are for territorial constituencies only) (Note: Includes 21,939 votes for the non-Coalition Unionists.)	221,145
Percentage	32.8% (Note: Includes 2.0% votes for the non-Coalition Unionists.)	19.1%
Swing	▼9.8%	New party
	Third party	Fourth party
Leader	H. H. Asquith	William Adamson
Party	Liberal	Labour
Alliance	Liberal
Leader since	7 December 1916	24 October 1917
Leader's seat	East Fife (lost seat)	West Fife
Last election	58 seats, 53.6%	3 seats, 3.6%
Seats won	8	6
Seat change	▼50	▲3
Popular vote	163,960	265,744
Percentage	15.0%	22.9%
Swing	▼38.6%	▲19.3%

On Wednesday 14 December 1918, the 1918 United Kingdom general election was held in Scotland, to elect all 707 members of the House of Commons, with 74 seats being in Scotland. 71 territorial seats (an increase of 1 over the previous election), comprising 32 burgh constituencies and 38 county constituencies. (Note: One burgh seat, Dundee, was represented by two members of parliament.) The territorial seats used the first past the post voting method. There was one university constituency, which elected an additional 3 members using the Single Transferable Vote (STV) method.

The election was called immediately after the Armistice with Germany which ended the First World War, and was held on Saturday, 14 December 1918. The governing coalition, under Prime Minister David Lloyd George, sent letters of endorsement to candidates who supported the coalition government, these being primarily Conservatives and Unionists and Coalition Liberals. These were nicknamed "Coalition Coupons", and led to the election being known as the "coupon election".

== Electoral system ==
It was the first general election to be held after enactment of the Representation of the People Act 1918. It was the first election and all men over the age of 21 could vote. By extension, it was the first election in which women over the age of 30 could vote in elections, though with some qualifications of property ownership. Under the same Act, the number of territorial seats was increased from the 70 seats used between the 1885 to December 1910 general elections, to 71 seats. Although there were 71 seats, this was within 70 constituencies as Dundee was represented by two seats. This arrangement of seats would be used until 1950.

The university constituency replaced the two single-member constituencies of Glasgow and Aberdeen Universities and Edinburgh and St Andrews Universities. This constituency would be used until it was abolished for the 1950.

== Candidates ==
Below is a table summarising the candidates of the 1918 general election in Scotland, excluding those in the Combined Scottish Universities constituency.

Affiliation	Candidates
Labour Party	39
Unionist Party	37 (Note: Includes 3 non-Coalition Unionist candidates, who did not receive Coalition Coupons.)
Scottish Liberal Party	33
Coalition Liberal	28
Independent	4 (Note: The candidates that stood were James Watson in Aberdeen South, Eunice Murray in Glasgow Bridgeton, John Brownlie Cadzow in Midlothian and Peebles Northern and J. R. Auld in North Lanarkshire.)
Highland Land League	4 (Note: The candidates that stood were MacNeill Weir in Argyllshire, George James Bruce in Inverness, Hector Munro in Ross and Cromarty and Hugh MacGowan in Western Isles.)
Co-operative Party	3 (Note: The candidates that stood were Henry May in Clackmannan and Eastern Stirlingshire, Peter Malcolm in Kilmarnock and John Biggar in Paisley.)
Independent Labour	3 (Note: The candidates that stood were Frank Rose in Aberdeen North, David Quin in Glasgow Central and Walter Graham Leachman in Glasgow Kelvingrove.)
Independent Liberal	2 (Note: The candidates that stood were Falconer Lewis Wallace Aberdeen and Kincardine East (although also recognised as Liberal) and J. Howard Whitehouse in Hamilton.)
Coalition National Democratic	2 (Note: The candidates that stood were Alexander Balfour in Edinburgh East and John Taylor in Paisley.)
Independent Unionist	2 (Note: The candidates that stood were Hugh Ferguson in Motherwell and Hugh Robert Wallace in South Ayrshire.)
Coalition Labour	1 (Note: Candidate George Barnes stood in Glasgow Gorbals.)
Scottish Prohibition Party	1 (Note: Leader Edwin Scrymgeour stood in Dundee.)
Miners' Reform Union	1 (Note: Candidate Arthur Ponsonby stood in Dunfermline Burghs.)
National Democratic and Labour Party	1 (Note: Candidate David Gilmour stood in Hamilton.)
British Socialist Party	1 (Note: Candidate James Dunlop MacDougall stood in Glasgow Tradeston.)
Greenock and District Dockers	1 (Note: Candidate Neal Haughey stood in Greenock.)
Independent Progressive	1 (Note: Candidate William Pritchard-Morgan stood in East Fife.)
Independent Democrat	1 (Note: Candidate Arthur Ponsonby stood in Dunfermline Burghs.)
Total	165

== Analysis ==
=== Coalition Liberals and Liberal party ===
The Coalition Liberals (led by Prime Minister David Lloyd George) took seats from the Liberal Party (led by H. H. Asquith), winning a greater number of votes and seats than the Liberal Party from which it emerged.

When combined with results from across the United Kingdom, the result was a massive landslide in favour of the coalition, with massive losses for Liberals who were not endorsed. Nearly all the Liberal MPs without coupons were defeated, including party leader H. H. Asquith, who lost his seat in East Fife. Asquith continued as Liberal leader, and subsequently returned to the parliament as member for Paisley in the 1920 Paisley by-election.

The Liberal Party lost a total of 50 seats in Scotland, with 51 losses but one gain from the Conservative Party. Conversely, the newly formed Coalition Liberals took a total of 26 seats (including one in the Combined Scottish Universities constituency). 24 of the gains amongst the Coalition Liberals came from the Liberal Party, with two coming from its partners in Scotland, the Unionist Party (in national affiliation with the Conservative Party).

=== Unionist Party ===
The Unionists, which had formed in 1912 from the unification of the Scottish branches of the Conservatives and Liberal Unionists were the main beneficiaries of the election, gaining 21 seats compared to the pre-war total of the two parties. However, the candidates were split such that, under the Coalition Coupons, 34 candidates of the 37 received coupons sponsored by the Coalition Government.

The Unionists with coalition coupons won 30 seats, with a gain of 21 seats solely from the Liberal Party. However, Unionists lost Kinross and Western Perthshire (which replaced the prior West Perthshire), Galloway (a new constituency that included the prior Unionist seat of Wigtownshire) and East Renfrewshire. The losses in Galloway and East Renfrewshire to their Coalition partner, the Coalition Liberals, and the loss in Kinross and Western Perthshire to the Liberal Party. The Coalitions liberal Party took two of the three seats in the Combined Scottish Universities constituency. Leader of the Conservative Party and future Prime Minister Bonar Law returned to a Scottish constituency in Glasgow Central, after last holding a Scottish constituency in the 1900 general election.

Three candidates, however, did not receive Coalition Coupons. These were Alexander Sprot in East Fife, William T. Shaw in Forfarshire, and Samuel Chapman. Against the trend of the majority of coalition candidates winning seats, with candidates with them being largesly unsuccessful, Alexander Sprot and William Shaw won their seats from the Liberal Party. Importantly, Sprot won East Fife from H. H. Asquith. Chapman was unsuccessful, however, would eventually be elected the MP for Edinburgh South at the next election. These were two further gains for the Unionist Party overall.

Although such non-Coalition Unionist candidates (and indeed Conservative Party candidates) did not receive Coalition Coupons, they did not form part of a bloc or opposition to the Coalition Government. Overall, the Unionist Party (in a national affiliation with the also newly formed Conservative Party), gained 24 seats but lost three, overall winning 21 more seats compared to the last election to a total of 32 in Scotland.

=== Labour and other parties ===
The Labor Party came second in terms of votes at 23.6% (behind the Unionist Party) won, but secured only 6 seats. As such, it was the third largest party in terms of seats in Scotland. Candidate James Brown won South Ayrshire from the Liberal Party, with Neil Maclean in Glasgow Govan from the Liberal Party. Duncan Graham won Hamilton from the Liberal Party, which had held the prior seat of Mid Lanarkshire. The party also retained the seats of West Fife and Glasgow Central (which replaced Glasgow Blackfriars and Hutchesontown), along with one of the two seats in Dundee.

Amongst the 10 Co-operative candidates across the United Kingdom at this election (the party's first general election, and only wherein the party was not yet under the Whips of the Labour Party), three candidates stood in Scotland. However, the group did not gain any seats. Similarly, neither the National Democratic and Labour Party nor the Coalition National Democratic and Labour won seats at this election for the coalition.

Within the Coalition, George Barnes (although not a recipient of a Coalition Coupon) won Glasgow Gorbals for the Coalition Labour group. He was one of five such candidates, and one of four of such winning candidates across the United Kingdom. Finally, Frank Rose won Aberdeen North as an Independent Labour candidate. Frank Rose is considered both a candidate for the Labour Party and as part of Independent Labour due to his defiance of the Labour Whip, but not considered an official Labour candidate in Parliamentary electoral records for the purposes of this election.

== Seat summary ==
Below is a table summarising the total number of seats, gains and losses for each party in both the territorial county and burgh constituencies and the Combined Scottish Universities constituency.

Party	Seats				
Party	Total	Gains	Losses	Net	Of total (%)
Coalition Government (Total)	59	New		▲48	79.7
Unionist	32 (Note: Includes 2 non-Coalition Unionist MPs.)	24	3	▲21 (Note: Includes +2 for non-Coalition Unionists.)	43.2
Coalition Liberal	26	New		▲26	35.1
Coalition Labour	1	New		▲1	1.4
Coalition NDP	0	New			—
Liberal	8	1	51	▼50	10.8
Labour	6	3	0	▲3	8.1
Independent Labour	1 (Note: Frank Rose in Aberdeen North.)	Did not stand in Dec. 1910		▲1	1.4
Total	74			▲2	

== County and burgh constituency results ==
Below is a table summarising the constituency results of the 1918 general election in Scotland, excluding the result in the Combined Scottish Universities constituency.

Party	Seats					Aggregate votes		
Party	Total	Gains	Losses	Net	Of total (%)	Total	Of total (%) (Note: Adjusted for multi-member constituencies.)	Change (%)
Coalition Government (Total)	56	New		▲47	78.9	606,198	54.3	New
Unionist	30 (Note: Includes 2 non-Coalition Unionist MPs.)	24 (Note: Includes 2 non-Coalition Unionist MPs.)	3 (Note: Archibald Stirling in Kinross and Western Perthshire, which replaced West Perthshire; John Dalrymple in Galloway, a new constituency that included Wigtownshire; and Sir John Gilmour in East Renfrewshire.)	▲21 (Note: Includes +2 for non-Coalition Unionists.)	42.3 (Note: Includes 2.8% for non-Coalition Unionists.)	358,469 (Note: Includes 21,939 for non-Coalition Unionists.)	32.8 (Note: Includes 2.0% for non-Coalition Unionists.)	▼9.8
Coalition Liberal	25	New		▲25	35.2	221,145	19.1	New
Coalition Labour	1	New		▲1	1.4	14,247	1.3	New
Coalition NDP	0	New			—	12,337	1.1	New
Labour	6	3	0	▲3	8.5	265,744	22.9	▲19.3
Liberal	8	1 (Note: James Gardiner in Kinross and Western Perthshire.)	51	▼50	11.3	163,960	15.0	▼38.6
Co-operative Party	0	New			—	19,841	1.8	New
Independent Labour	1 (Note: Frank Rose in Aberdeen North.)	Did not stand in Dec. 1910		▲1	1.4	15,876	1.4	New
Scottish Prohibition	0	0	0	Steady	—	10,423	0.5	▲0.3
Independent	0	Did not stand in Dec. 1910			—	9,306	0.8	—N/a
Highland Land League	0	New			—	8,710	0.8	New
Independent Liberal	0	Did not stand in Dec. 1910			—	4,847	0.4	—N/a
Miners' Reform Union	0	New			—	5,076	0.5	New
National Democratic and Labour	0	New			—	4,297	0.4	New
Independent Democrat	0	New			—	3,491	0.3	New
British Socialist	0	New			—	3,751	0.3	New
Independent Unionist	0	New			—	2,550	0.2	New
Greenock and District Dockers	0	New			—	2,050	0.2	New
Independent Progressive	0	New			—	591	0.1	New
Total	71			▲1	100.0	1,126,711	100.0	0.0
Registered voters, and turnout						1,989,368 (Note: Electorate in contested constituencies. The total electorate was 2,205,383.)	55.1	▼26.7

=== Popular vote ===
Popular vote
Unionist	31.8%
Labour	23.6%
Coalition Liberal	19.6%
Liberal	14.6%
Ind. Labour	1.4%
Coalition Labour	1.3%
Coalition NDP	1.1%
Other	6.6%

Popular vote (coalitions)
Coalition	53.8%
Labour	23.6%
Liberal	14.6%
Ind. Labour	1.4%
Other	6.6%

=== Parliament seats ===
Parliament seats
Unionist	43.2%
Coalition Liberal	35.1%
Liberal	10.8%
Labour	8.1%
Ind. Labour	1.4%
Coalition Labour	1.4%

Parliament seats (coalitions)
Coalition	79.7%
Liberal	10.8%
Labour	8.1%
Ind. Labour	1.4%

== Combined Scottish Universities result ==
The Combined Scottish Universities elected an additional 3 members to the house using the STV voting method.

Liberal Party candidate Dugald Cowan held the "Coupon" as a candidate at this election, and so his election represented a gain for the Coalition Liberals, who therefore won 26 seats in total. Both Scottish Unionist candidates were also Coalition coupon recipients.

General election, November 1918: Combined Scottish Universities
Party	Candidate	Votes	%	±%
Unionist	✓ Watson Cheyne	3,719	28.7	
National Liberal	✓ Dugald Cowan	3,499	27.0	
Unionist	✓ Henry Craik	3,286	25.4	
Labour	Peter Macdonald	1,581	12.2	
Independent	William Robert Smith	850	6.6	
Majority		1,705	13.2	
Turnout		12,935		
Unionist win (new seat)				
National Liberal win (new seat)				
Unionist win (new seat)				

== See also ==
- 1918 United Kingdom general election in England
- 1918 United Kingdom general election in Ireland
- 1918 United Kingdom general election in Wales
- List of United Kingdom Parliament constituencies (1885–1918) by region
