= 1950 United Kingdom general election in Wales =

- 23 February 1950

All 36 Welsh seats to the House of Commons
- Turnout: 84.8% (▲9.1 pp)
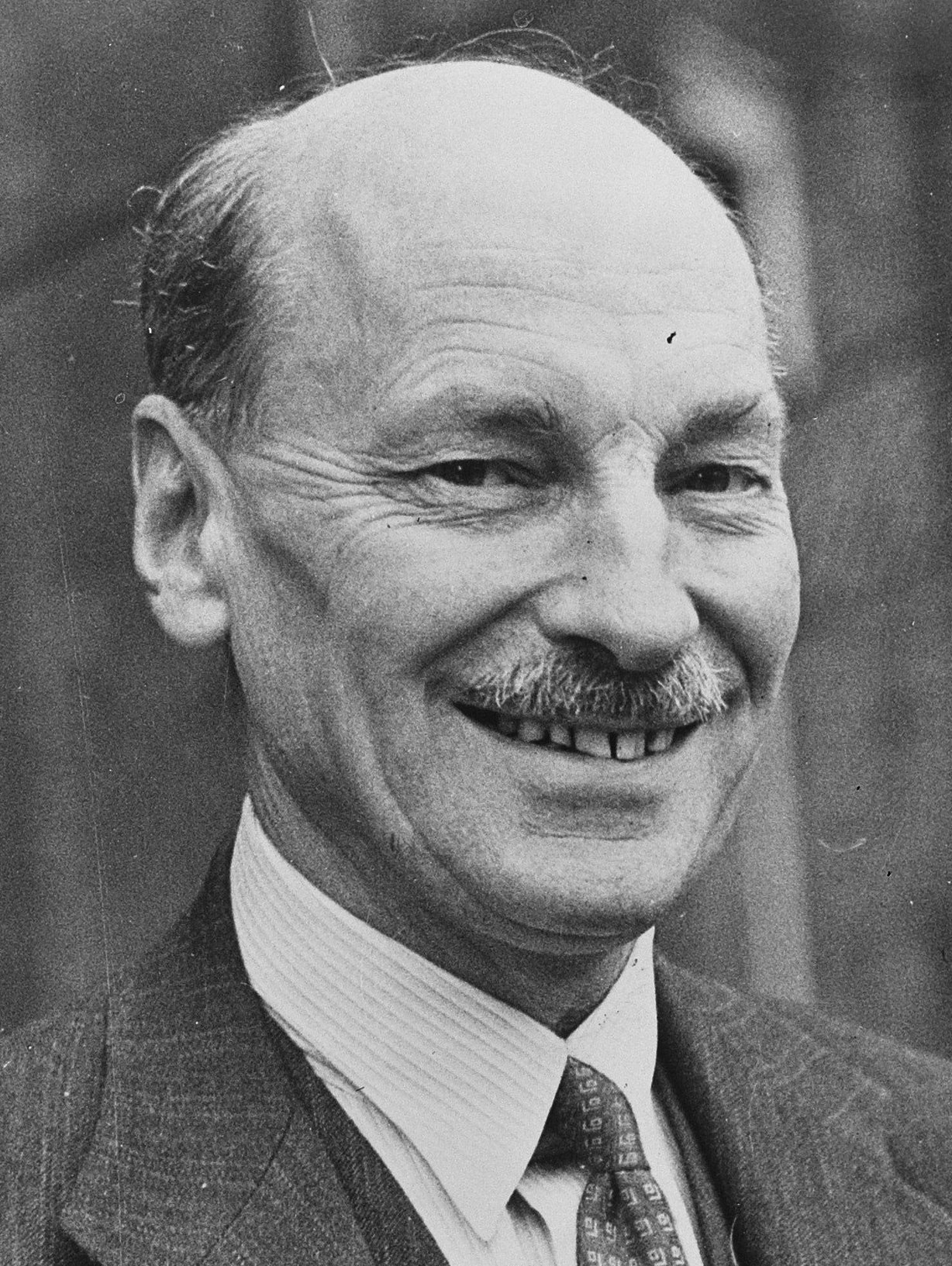

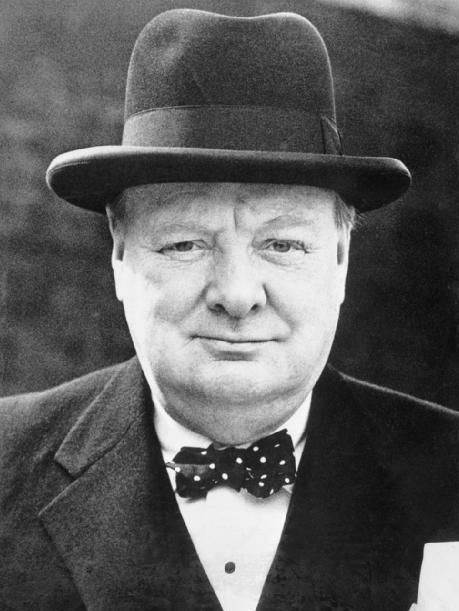

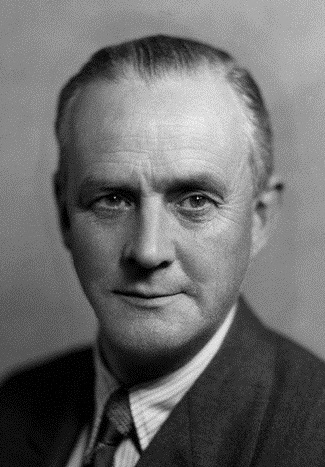
	First party	Second party	Third party
Leader	Clement Attlee	Winston Churchill	Clement Davies
Party	Labour	Conservative	Liberal
Leader since	25 October 1935	9 October 1940	2 August 1945
Leader's seat	Walthamstow West	Woodford	Montgomeryshire
Last election	25 seats, 58.5%	4 seats, 22.9% (Note: Combined Conservative Party and National Liberal Party results in 1945, as the National Liberal Party had merged with the Conservative Party at the constituency level following the Woolton-Teviot Agreement.)	7 seats, (Note: Seat count includes 1 Liberal Party seat in the abolished University of Wales constituency.) 14.9%
Seats won	27	4	5
Seat change	▲2	Steady	▼2 (Note: Includes loss of abolished University of Wales constituency.)
Popular vote	887,984	418,668	193,090
Percentage	58.1%	27.4%	12.6%
Swing	▼0.4 pp	▲4.5 pp	▼2.3 pp

On Thursday 23 February 1950, the 1950 United Kingdom general election was held in Wales, to elect all 625 members of the House of Commons, with 36 constituencies being in Wales.

This was also the first election to be held after a full 5-year term of a Labour government in office. The turnout registered nationally in this election remains the highest for any election in the post-war era. The election saw Labour win the most votes and seats in Wales, retaining its overall 27 seats, retaining its position as the largest party in Wales at this election.

== Boundary review ==
Prior to the election, the Representation of the People Act 1948 and House of Commons (Redistribution of Seats) Act 1949 passed. These Acts removed plurality voting and redistributed the seats in Wales to the House of Commons, and redistributed the national electoral boundaries in Wales that had been in use between the 1918 to 1945 general elections.

The University of Wales constituency was abolished, however the number of territorial county and borough constituencies was increased from 35 seats to 36. Overall, there was not change in the total of seats in Wales. These boundaries were, however, and only used in this election and 1951, before being changed for the 1955 general election following the official implementation of the First periodic review of Westminster constituencies.

== Candidates ==
Below is a table summarising the candidates of the 1950 general election in Wales.

Affiliation	Candidates
Labour Party	36
Conservative and Unionist Party	29
Liberal Party	21
Plaid Cymru	7
National Liberal Party	6
Communist Party of Great Britain	4
Independent Welsh Nationalist	1 (Note: Candidate Trefor Richard Morgan stood in Merthyr Tydfil.)
Welsh Republican Movement	1 (Note: Candidate Ithel Davies stood in Ogmore.)
Total	105

== Analysis ==
The election saw the Labour party win the most votes and seats in Wales, retaining its overall 27 seats. The party retained most of its seats from the re-organisation, only losing one seat to the Conservatives, with a gain of one seat from the Liberal Party as well as the new seat of East Flintshire. Overall, Labour saw an increase of 2 seats across Wales with a minor drop in vote share.

The Conservative Party had merged with the National Liberal Party at the constituency level following the Woolton-Teviot Agreement in 1947. The Liberal National Party had also renamed itself as the National Liberal Party. Overall, the Conservatives and Liberal Nationals under the Conservative Party alliance retained their four total seats under the changed boundaries, with one being held by the National Liberal Party. This was Garner Evans in the seat of Denbigh. The Conservatives won the new seats of West Flintshire (created from the Conservative-held Flintshire) and Cardiff North (created from Cardiff Central, as well as retaining Monmouth. The gain in Cardiff North was from Labour. The Conservative Party, however, lost the reorganised seat of Caernarvon Boroughs, which became Caernarvon. This loss was to Labour. The Conservatives along with the National Liberal Party saw no overall change in Wales in this election.

The Liberal Party retained its seats of Anglesey, Cardiganshire, Carmarthen and Merioneth, with Leader of the Liberal Party Clement Davies retaining Montgomeryshire. However, the party lost Pembrokeshire wherein the sitting MP Gwilym Lloyd George stood instead as a candidate for the National Liberal Party rather than the Liberal Party. Furthermore, the Liberals its single seat in the abolished University of Wales constituency. The sitting MP W. J. Gruffydd did not re-contest any seat in this election, and left therefore Parliament at this election.

== Results ==
Below is a table summarising the results of the 1950 general election in Wales.

Party	Seats					Aggregate votes		
Party	Total	Gains	Losses	Net	Of total (%)	Total	Of total (%)	Change (%)
Labour	27	3	1	▲2	75.0	887,984	58.1	▼0.4
Conservative (Total)	4	1	1	Steady	11.1	418,668	27.4	▲4.5
Conservative	3	1	1	Steady	8.3	320,750	21.0	▲2.9
National Liberal	1	0	0	Steady	2.8	97,918	6.4	▲1.6
Liberal	5	0	1	▼1	13.9	193,090	12.6	▼5.0
Plaid Cymru	0	0	0	Steady	—	17,580	1.2	▲0.1
Communist	0	0	0	Steady	—	9,048	0.6	▼0.6
Independent Welsh Nationalist	0	New			—	1,511	0.1	New
Welsh Republican	0	New			—	631	0.0	New
Total	36			▲1	100.0	1,528,554	100.0	0.0
Registered voters, and turnout						1,802,356 (Note: Electorate in contested constituencies, which was all seats in this election.)	84.8	▲9.1

Popular vote
Labour	58.1%
Conservative	27.4%
Liberal	12.6%
Plaid Cymru	1.2%
Communist	0.6%
Other	0.1%

Parliament seats
Labour	75.0%
Liberal	13.9%
Conservative	11.1%

== See also ==
- 1950 United Kingdom general election in England
- 1950 United Kingdom general election in Scotland
- 1950 United Kingdom general election in Northern Ireland
- List of MPs for constituencies in Wales (1950–1951)
