= Opinion polling for the 1950 United Kingdom general election =

In the run-up to the 1950 general election, various organisations carry out opinion polling to gauge voting intention. Results of such polls are displayed in this article.

The date range for these opinion polls are from the 1945 general election until the general election.

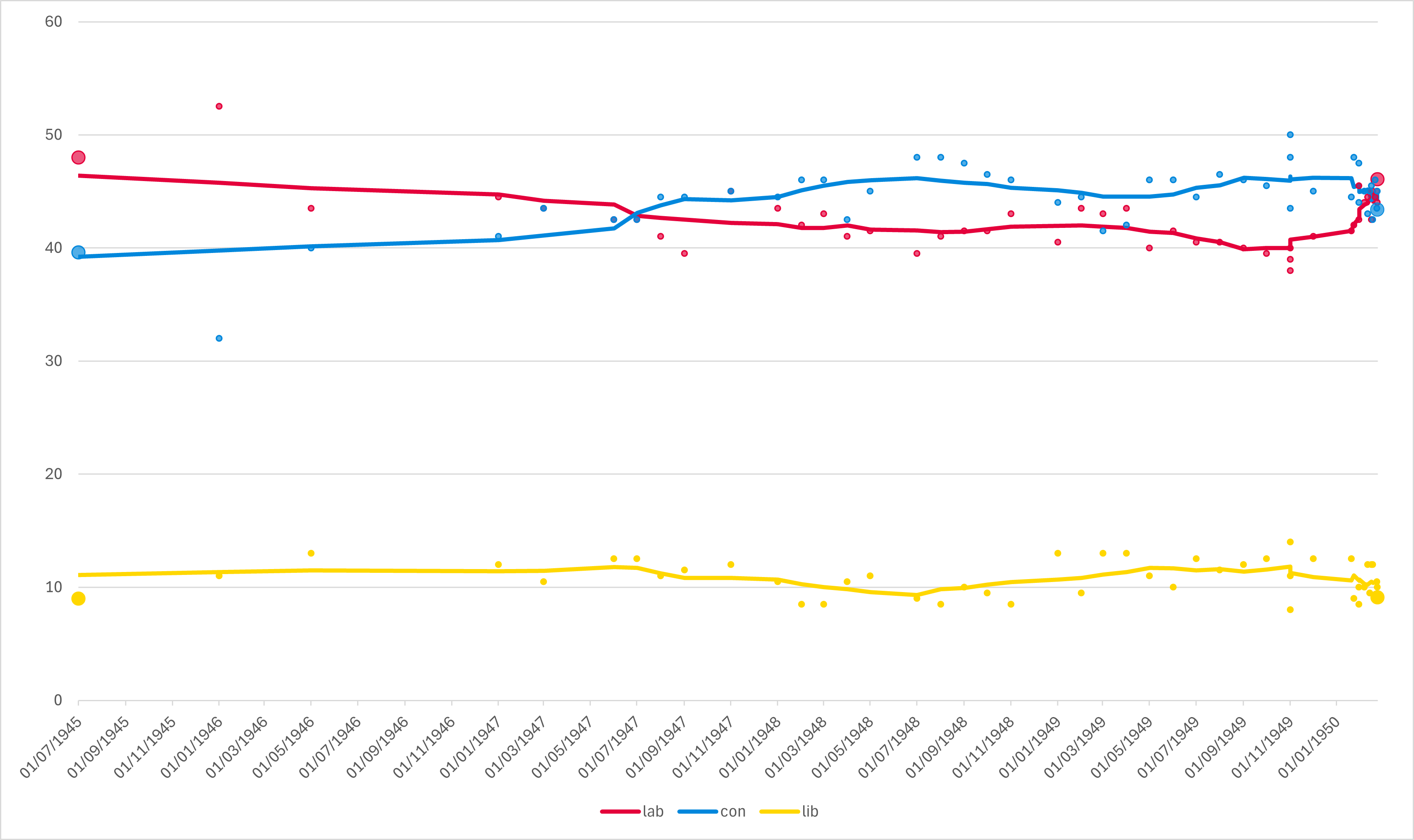
UK opinion polling for the election

== Polling results ==
All data is from PollBase

=== 1950 ===
Date(s) conducted/ published	Pollster	Client	Lab	Con	Lib	Lead
23 Feb	1950 general election		46.1%	43.4%	9.1%	2.7%
17–23 Feb	Daily Express		44%	45%	10%	1%
17–22 Feb	Gallup	News Chronicle	45%	43.5%	10.5%	1.5%
5–15 Feb	Daily Mail	News Chronicle	42.5%	45.5%	12%	3%
20 Feb	Daily Express		44.5%	46%	9%	1.5%
17 Feb	Gallup	News Chronicle	45%	42.5%	12%	2.5%
13 Feb	Daily Express		45%	45%	9.5%	Tie
10 Feb	Gallup	News Chronicle	44.5%	43%	12%	1.5%
6 Feb	Daily Express		44%	45%	10%	1%
30 Jan	Daily Express		42.5%	47.5%	8.5%	5%
30 Jan	Gallup	News Chronicle	45.5%	44%	10%	1.5%
23 Jan	Daily Express		42%	48%	9%	6%
20 Jan	Gallup	News Chronicle	41.5%	44%	12.5%	2.5%

=== 1949 ===
Date Published	Pollster	Client	Lab	Con	Lib	Lead
Dec	Gallup	News Chronicle	41%	45%	12.5%	4%
Nov	Gallup	News Chronicle	38%	48%	11%	10%
Nov	Gallup	News Chronicle	40%	43.5%	14%	3.5%
Nov	1950 General Election book		39%	50%	8%	11%
Oct	Gallup	News Chronicle	39.5%	45.5%	12.5%	6%
Sep	Gallup	News Chronicle	40%	46%	12%	6%
Aug	Gallup	News Chronicle	40.5%	46.5%	11.5%	6%
Jul	Gallup	News Chronicle	40.5%	44.5%	12.5%	4%
Jun	Gallup	News Chronicle	41.5%	46%	10%	5.5%
May	Gallup	News Chronicle	40%	46%	11%	6%
Apr	Gallup	News Chronicle	43.5%	42%	13%	1.5%
Mar	Gallup	News Chronicle	43%	41.5%	13%	1%
Feb	Gallup	News Chronicle	43.5%	44.5%	9.5%	1%
Jan	Gallup	News Chronicle	40.5%	44%	13%	3.5%

=== 1948 ===
Date Published	Pollster	Client	Lab	Con	Lib	Lead
Nov	Gallup	News Chronicle	43%	46%	8.5%	3%
Oct	Gallup	News Chronicle	41.5%	46.5%	9.5%	5%
Sep	Gallup	News Chronicle	41.5%	47.5%	10%	6%
Aug	Gallup	News Chronicle	41%	48%	8.5%	7%
Jul	Gallup	News Chronicle	39.5%	48%	9%	8.5%
May	Gallup	News Chronicle	41.5%	45%	11%	3.5%
Apr	Gallup	News Chronicle	41%	42.5%	10.5%	1.5%
Mar	Gallup	News Chronicle	43%	46%	8.5%	3%
Feb	Gallup	News Chronicle	42%	46%	8.5%	4%
Jan	Gallup	News Chronicle	43.5%	44.5%	10.5%	1%

=== 1947 ===
Date Published	Pollster	Client	Lab	Con	Lib	Lead
Nov	Gallup	News Chronicle	45%	45%	12%	Tie
Sep	Gallup	News Chronicle	39.5%	44.5%	11.5%	5%
Aug	Gallup	News Chronicle	41%	44.5%	11%	3.5%
Jul	Gallup	News Chronicle	42.5%	42.5%	12.5%	Tie
June	Gallup	News Chronicle	42.5%	42.5%	12.5%	Tie
Mar	Gallup	News Chronicle	43.5%	43.5%	10.5%	Tie
Jan	Gallup	News Chronicle	44.5%	41%	12%	3.5%

=== 1946 ===
Date Published	Pollster	Client	Lab	Con	Lib	Lead
May	Gallup	News Chronicle	43.5%	40%	13%	3.5%
Jan	Gallup	News Chronicle	52.5%	32%	11%	20.5%
July 1945	1945 general election		49.7%	36.2%	9%	13.5%
