= William Watkin =

William Watkin may refer to:

- William Watkin (MP for Pembroke) (fl.1558), MP for Pembroke Boroughs, Wales
- William Watkin (MP for Wells) (fl.1592-1597), mayor and MP for Wells, Somerset, England
- William Thompson Watkin (1836–1888), English archaeologist

== See also ==
- William Watkins (disambiguation)
