= 1950 United Kingdom general election =

- 23 February 1950

All 625 seats in the House of Commons 313 seats needed for a majority
- Opinion polls
- Registered: 34,412,266
- Turnout: 28,771,124; 83.9% (▲11.1 pp)
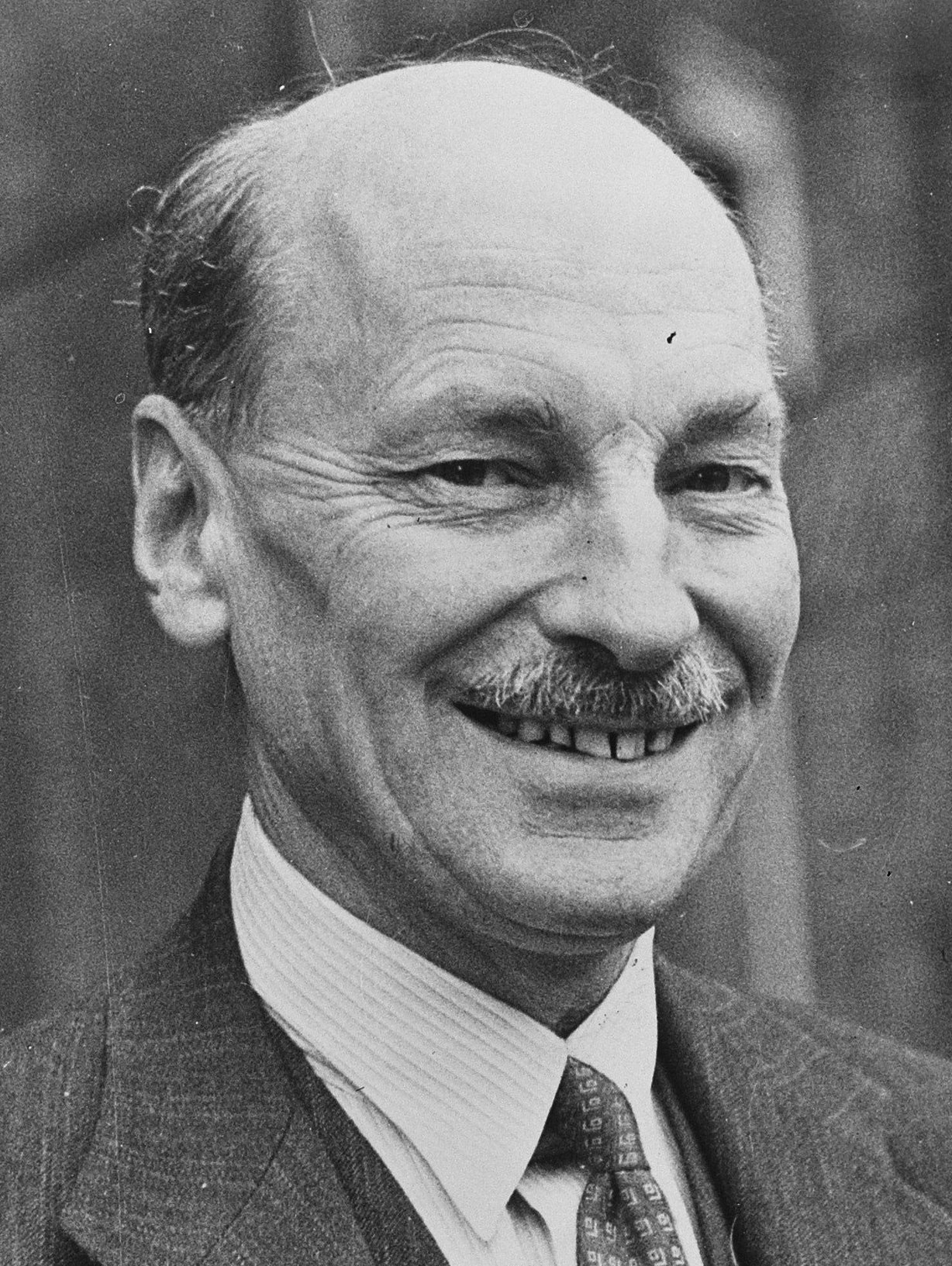

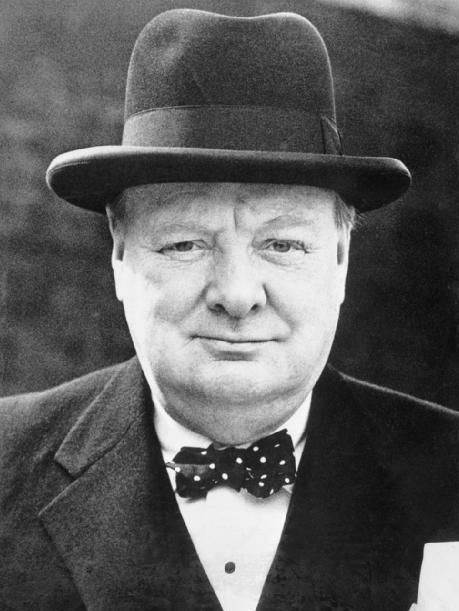

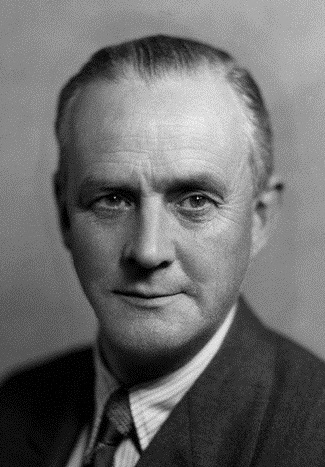
	First party	Second party	Third party
Leader	Clement Attlee	Winston Churchill	Clement Davies
Party	Labour	Conservative	Liberal
Leader since	25 October 1935	9 October 1940	2 August 1945
Leader's seat	Walthamstow West (Note: Represented Limehouse until the election.)	Woodford	Montgomeryshire
Last election	393 seats, 48.0%	208 seats, 39.1% (Note: Combined Conservative Party and National Liberal Party results in 1945, as the National Liberal Party had merged with the Conservative Party at the constituency level following the Woolton-Teviot Agreement in 1947.)	12 seats, 9.0%
Seats won	315	298 (Note: Figure includes Speaker of the House of Commons Douglas Clifton Brown in Hexham.)	9
Seat change	▼78	▲90	▼3
Popular vote	13,266,176	12,492,404	2,621,487
Percentage	46.1%	43.4%	9.1%
Swing	▼1.9 pp	▲4.3 pp	▲0.1 pp
- Colours denote the winning party

- Composition of the House of Commons after the election
Prime Minister before election
Clement Attlee
Labour
Prime Minister after election
Clement Attlee
Labour

A general election was held in the United Kingdom on Thursday 23 February 1950, and was the first after a full term of a majority Labour Party government. It was also the first general election after the abolition of plural voting and university constituencies. The general election saw Labour returned to power, but its majority was dramatically reduced from 146 seats to just 5, with a sizeable swing towards the Conservative Party, which gained 90 seats.

Turnout in this general election increased to 83.9%, the highest turnout in a United Kingdom general election under universal suffrage, and represented an increase of 11.1 percentage points from the 72.8% turnout in 1945.

The 1950 general election was also the first to be covered on television. (No recording was made of the live broadcast; this was the standard practice at the time). Richard Dimbleby hosted the BBC coverage of the election, which he would later do again for the 1951, 1955, 1959 and the 1964 general elections. On this occasion, Dimbleby was joined in the BBC Alexandra Palace studios by R. B. McCallum, Fellow of Pembroke College, Oxford, and author of The British General Election of 1945, and David Butler, research student of Nuffield College. The programme ran from 10:45 pm until just after 1:00 am.

Another general election was called in the following year, which the Conservatives won, restoring Winston Churchill as Prime Minister after six years in opposition.

== Background ==
Labour had governed the nation ever since their landslide in 1945. During its first term in office, the government introduced several major reforms: a National Health Service was established, around 20% of the economy was nationalised, a comprehensive system of social security was implemented, and, under the New Towns Act 1946, development corporations were set up to construct new towns.

Britain was confronted with severe economic challenges: the country faced a large national debt, its industries were weakened, and there were many shortages of food and raw materials. As a result, the Labour government continued rationing, and austerity was implemented, relying heavily on American loans and the Marshall Plan. While these measures were enacted to contain inflationary pressures, the British public suffered a fatigue. This prevented the Labour government from implementing some of its ambitious programmes.

Before the general election, major significant changes to the electoral system had occurred, including the abolition of plural voting by the Representation of the People Act 1948, and a major reorganisation of constituencies by the House of Commons (Redistribution of Seats) Act 1949. Eleven new English seats were created and six were abolished, and there were over 170 major alterations to constituencies across the country.

Prime Minister Clement Attlee planned to call a summer general election. However, his Chancellor of the Exchequer, Stafford Cripps, refused to present a budget before a general election. As a result, Attlee was persuaded to call a February general election. Parliament was dissolved on 3 February 1950.

== Campaign ==
The Conservatives, having recovered from their landslide election defeat in 1945, accepted the broad framework of the welfare state and nationalisation that had taken place under the Attlee government, which included the National Health Service and the mixed economy. The Conservative manifesto, This Is The Road, accepted the new welfare state's foundations but criticised what it saw as the loss of freedoms and aspirations under Labour, with Churchill claiming Attlee had not "levelled up" but had actually "levelled down".

The campaign essentially focused on the possible future nationalisation of other sectors and industries, which was opposed by the Conservatives but supported by Labour. The Liberals essentially viewed the struggle between the two parties on this issue as a class struggle.

The Liberal Party fielded 475 candidates, more than at any general election since 1929. Liberal Party leader Clement Davies felt that the party had been at a disadvantage at the 1945 general election when they ran fewer candidates than needed to form a government. Davies arranged for the cost of running extra candidates to be offset by the party taking out insurance with Lloyd's of London against more than fifty candidates losing their deposits.

In the event, the strategy only succeeded in causing a very marginal increase in the overall Liberal vote over the previous election (although it was still their best popular vote percentage since 1929); the number of votes per candidate declined sharply, resulting in them losing a further three seats from their already-disappointing 1945 showing. A total of 319 Liberal candidates lost their deposits, a record number until the 2015 general election, when candidates for the Liberal Democrats lost 335 deposits at the general election held in that year.

== Aftermath ==
In the end, Labour lost 78 seats and its majority was reduced from 146 seats to just 5 seats. The Conservatives recovered significantly, seeing a resurgence in their support: they gained 90 seats and saw their vote share improve by 4.3 percentage points. With such a slender majority, Attlee had very little room for political manoeuvring, and passing legislation became difficult, with continued austerity and rationing straining Attlee's government from public support. As a result, seeking a better mandate, a general election was called the following year. However, despite winning the most votes (48.8% and 13,948,385 votes), they lost 20 seats, and Churchill was returned to power with a majority of 17 seats.

Analysis showed that Labour suffered huge losses of seats due to a "revolt of the suburbs", with substantial swings against them among Middle England voters in London, the Home Counties, Essex and Middlesex. The effects of the Labour government's continued austerity and inflation had a negative effect for middle-income voters, with rationing of basic foods like bread and powdered egg proving incredibly unpopular. While campaigning in Leicester, Attlee was met with "catcalls" and chants of "vermin" while Hugh Gaitskell observed there was "a collection of grievances among the lower middle class and middle class" against Labour.

The election began the factionalization of the Labour Party into the Bevanite and Gaitskellite factions. Following the general election, Hugh Gaitskell blamed Aneurin Bevan for their party's disappointing performance, which led to a growing rift between the two.

Prominent personalities entering Parliament in this election included Edward Heath (Bexley), Jo Grimond (Orkney and Shetland), Enoch Powell (Wolverhampton South West), Reginald Maudling (Barnet) and Iain Macleod (Enfield West).

Scottish politician Willie Gallacher lost his West Fife seat to Labour, as did Phil Piratin in the abolished seat of Mile End; these were the last Members Parliament for the Communist Party of Great Britain.

== Results ==
=== Summary of seats returned ===
Party	Leader	MPs		Aggregate votes	
Party	Leader		Of total		Of total
Labour Party	Clement Attlee	315 (Note: Includes 18 Co-operative Party MP, as part of the Labour-Co-op alliance.)	50.4%	13,266,176	46.1%
Conservative and Unionist Party	Winston Churchill	298	47.7%	12,492,404	43.4%
Conservative Party (Note: Conservative and Unionist Party results for England and Wales.)	Winston Churchill	246	39.4%	10,140,818	35.2%
Unionist Party	James Stuart	26	4.2%	1,013,909	3.5%
National Liberal Party	John Maclay	16	2.6%	985,343	3.4%
Ulster Unionist Party	Basil Brooke	10	1.6%	352,334	1.2%
Liberal Party	Clement Davies	9	1.4%	2,621,487	9.1%
Nationalist Party	James McSparran	2	0.3%	65,211	0.2%
Independent Liberal	—N/a	1	0.2%	15,066	0.1%

=== Full results ===

Results of the February 1950 general election to the House of Commons of the United Kingdom
Party	Leader	Candidates	MPs					Aggregate votes		
Party	Leader	Candidates	Total	Gains	Losses	Net	Of total (%)	Total	Of total (%)	Change (%)
Labour	Clement; Attlee	617 (Note: Includes 33 Co-operative Party candidates, as part of the Labour-Co-op alliance.)	315 (Note: Includes 18 Co-operative Party MPs, as part of the Labour-Co-op alliance.)	—N/a (Note: Difficult to calculate due to significant boundary changes.)		▼78 (Note: Includes ▼5 Co-operative Party MPs, as part of the Labour-Co-op alliance.)	50.4 (Note: Includes 2.8% for the Co-operative Party, as part of the Labour-Co-op alliance.)	13,266,176 (Note: Includes 719,756 for the Co-operative Party, as part of the Labour-Co-op alliance.)	46.1 (Note: Includes 2.5% for the Co-operative Party, as part of the Labour-Co-op alliance.)	▼1.9 (Note: Includes ▼0.1% for the Co-operative Party, as part of the Labour-Co-op alliance.)
Conservative (Total)	Winston; Churchill	619	298	—N/a		▲90	47.7	12,492,404	43.4	▲4.3
Conservative (Note: Figure includes the Unionist Party and the Ulster Unionist Party under their nation affiliations with the Conservative Party.)	Winston; Churchill	564	282	—N/a		▲85	45.1	11,507,061	40.0	▲3.8
National Liberal	John; Maclay	55	16	5	0	▲5	2.6	985,343	3.4	▲0.5
Liberal	Clement; Davies	475	9	3	6	▼3	1.4	2,621,487	9.1	▲0.1
Communist	Harry; Pollitt	100	0	0	2	▼2	—	91,765	0.3	▼0.1
Nationalist	James; McSparran	2	2	0	0	Steady	0.3	65,211	0.2	▼0.2
Independent	—N/a	9	0	0	8	▼8	—	53,505	0.2	▼0.3
Irish Labour	William; Norton	2	0	New			—	52,715	0.2	New
Labour Independent Group	Denis; Pritt	5	0	New			—	26,014	0.1	New
Sinn Féin	Paddy; McLogan	2	0	Did not stand in 1945			—	23,362	0.1	—N/a
Plaid Cymru	Gwynfor; Evans	7	0	0	0	Steady	—	17,580	0.1	Steady
Independent; Liberal	—N/a	2	1 (Note: John MacLeod in Ross and Cromarty.)	0	1 (Note: Murdoch Macdonald in Inverness.)	▼1	0.2	15,066	0.1	Steady
Independent; Conservative	—N/a	4	0	0	0	Steady	—	13,689	0.1	▲0.1
SNP	Robert; McIntyre	3	0	0	0	Steady	—	9,708	0.0	▼0.1
Independent; Labour	—N/a	2	0	0	2	▼2	—	6,839	0.0	▼0.3
Anti-Partition	James; McSparran	4	0	New			—	5,084	0.0	New
Ind. Labour Party	David; Gibson	4	0	0	3	▼3	—	4,112	0.0	▼0.2
Independent; Welsh Nationalist	—N/a	1	0	New			—	1,511	0.0	New
Scottish; Self-Government	—N/a	1	0	New			—	1,039	0.0	New
Scottish; Home Rule	—N/a	2	0	New			—	915	0.0	New
Welsh; Republican	—N/a	1	0	New			—	631	0.0	New
Social Credit	John; Hargrave	1	0	Did not stand in 1945			—	551	0.0	—N/a
Christian; Democratic	—N/a	1	0	New			—	503	0.0	New
Socialist (GB)	Collective; Leadership	2	0	0	0	Steady	—	503	0.0	Steady
United Socialist Movement	Guy; Aldred	1	0	0	0	Steady	—	485	0.0	Steady
Independent; Scottish Nationalist	—N/a	1	0	0	0	Steady	—	283	0.0	Steady
Other non-contested		0	0	—N/a		▼8 (Note: 2 National MPs, 2 National Independent MPs, 2 Independent Unionist MPs, 1 Common Wealth Party MP, and 1 Independent progressive MP.)	—	0	0.0	—N/a
Total		1,868	625			▼15	100.0	28,771,124	100.0	0.0
Registered voters, and turnout								34,412,266	83.9	▲11.1

=== Votes summary ===
Popular vote
Labour	46.11%
Conservative	43.42%
Liberal	9.11%
Others	1.36%

=== Seats summary ===
Parliamentary seats
Labour	50.40%
Conservative	47.68%
Liberal	1.44%
Others	0.48%

== See also ==
- List of MPs elected in the 1950 United Kingdom general election
- 1950 United Kingdom general election in England
- 1950 United Kingdom general election in Scotland
- 1950 United Kingdom general election in Wales
- 1950 United Kingdom general election in Northern Ireland
