= William Watkins (cleric) =

William Watkins (fl. 1750–1762) was a cleric and writer, based in Breconshire.

Little is known about his life other than that he spent some time at Trinity Hall, Cambridge, and worked around Hay-on-Wye. As a writer Watkins authored A Treatise on Forest Trees (1753), the earliest published book about trees in Wales.

Watkins had a wife and daughter, but both died from smallpox in 1752.
