= W. P. Watkins =

- Born: William Pascoe Watkins; 5 December 1893; Plymouth, Devon, England
- Died: 2 January 1995 (aged 101)
- Education: University of London
- Movement: Co-operative
- Spouse: Mary Underwood (m. 1925)
- Father: William Henry Watkins

William Pascoe Watkins (5 December 1893 – 2 January 1995) was an English co-operator and writer who served as director of the International Co-operative Alliance from 1951 to 1963.

== Biography ==
Watkins was born in Plymouth, Devon, the son of co-operator William Henry Watkins. Watkins trained as a teacher and was awarded a degree in philosophy and economics from the University of London, and served in France during the First World War.

In 1920, he began working as a tutor at the Co-operative College. In 1929 he joined the secretariat of the International Co-operative Alliance, then from 1940 he worked in the editorial staff of the Reynold's News. In 1946 he was appointed as an advisor on co-operatives to the Control Commission for Germany, rehabilitating the country's consumer co-operative movement, for which in 1959 he was awarded the Cross of Merit from the Federal Republic of Germany. In 1951 he was appointed director of the International Co-operative Alliance, retiring in 1963.

Watkins died 2 January 1995 aged 101.

== Books ==
- Hall, F.; Watkins, W. P. (1934). Co-operation: A Survey of the History, Principles, and Organisation of the Co-operative Movement in Great Britain and Ireland. Manchester: The Co-operative Union.
- Watkins, W. P. (1970). The International Co-operative Alliance 1895–1970. London: International Co-operative Alliance.
- Watkins, W. P. (1986). Co-operative Principles: Today and Tomorrow. Manchester: Holyoake Books.

== Translations ==
- Poisson, Ernest (1925). The Co-operative Republic. Translated by Watkins, William Pascoe.
