= William Henry Watkins =

- Born: 19 March 1862; Plymouth, Devon, England
- Died: 29 July 1924 (aged 62)
- Children: William Pascoe Watkins

William Henry Watkins (19 March 1862 – 29 July 1924) was a British co-operative activist.

Born in Plymouth, Watkins studied at Plymouth Public School and the Apprentices School, then took politics and economics through the University of Oxford's extension course. He completed an apprenticeship as a shipwright before taking a land-based clerical position for the Royal Navy, working in stores.

In 1887, Watkins joined the Plymouth Co-operative Society, and he spent much of the remainder of his life teaching for the movement. He was a founder of a local co-operative house painters' society, and took various posts in the movement, becoming secretary of the Co-operative Union's south west region, and serving on its central board and various national committees. He was president of the Co-operative Congress in 1910 and of the Plymouth Co-operative Society from 1914 to 1919. A strong advocate of the movement involving itself in politics, he was the first chairman of the Co-operative Party, serving until his death.

Watkins also served on the Consumer Council, and from 1919 until his death was a Labour Party member of Plymouth City Council.

Party political offices
Preceded by New position	Chairman of the Co-operative Party; 1918 – 1924	Succeeded by Alfred Barnes
