= William Henderson Pringle =

William Henderson Pringle in 1929

William Henderson Pringle (1877 – 23 April 1967), was a Scottish Liberal Party politician and economist.

== Background ==
He was the son of the Reverend John Pringle. He was educated at Hamilton Academy and privately, the University of Edinburgh, the University of Glasgow and the London School of Economics. He married Annie Nelson Forrest. They had one son and one daughter. She died in 1961. In 1965 he married Agnes Ross.

== Career ==
In 1905 he was Called to the Bar, at Lincoln's Inn. He was the recognised teacher of Economics and University Extension Lecturer, at the University of London from 1910 to 1920. He worked at the Ministry of Munitions, Labour Department, from 1915 to 1916 and the Ministry of Reconstruction, from 1917 to 1919. He was lecturer on Economics, at Birkbeck College, University of London, from 1918 to 1920. He was Professor of Economics, at the University of New Zealand, from 1920 to 1922. He was a lecturer at the London School of Economics, from 1923 to 1924. He was the Principal of the City of Birmingham Commercial College, from 1925 to 1942.

== Political career ==
At parliamentary General Elections he contested, as a Liberal party candidate Berwick and Haddington in 1922,

General Election 1922: Berwick and Haddington Electorate
Party	Candidate	Votes	%	±%
National Liberal	Walter Waring	6,342		
Labour	Robert Spence	5,842		
Liberal	William Henderson Pringle	4,422		
Independent Liberal	John Deans Hope	3,300		
Turnout				
Majority				
National Liberal hold		Swing		

Ayr Burghs in 1923

General Election 1923: Ayr Burghs Electorate 34,852
Party	Candidate	Votes	%	±%
Unionist	Rt Hon Sir John Lawrence Baird	10,206	41.8	
Labour	J.M. Airlie	7,732	31.7	
Liberal	William Henderson Pringle	6,467	26.5	
Turnout			70.0	
Majority				
Unionist hold		Swing		

and Berwick and Haddington again in 1924.

General Election 1924: Berwick and Haddington Electorate 34,017
Party	Candidate	Votes	%	±%
Unionist	Chichester de Windt Crookshank	11,745		
Labour	Robert Spence	8,882		
Liberal	William Henderson Pringle	4,986		
Turnout				
Majority		2,863		
Unionist gain from Labour		Swing		

He did not stand for parliament again. He was a Scottish Representative of the New Commonwealth Society.
