= 1978 Berwick and East Lothian by-election =

1978 UK parliamentary by-election

- 26 October 1978

Constituency of Berwick and East Lothian
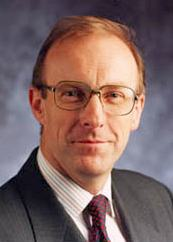

	First party	Second party	Third party
Candidate	John Home Robertson	Margaret Marshall	Isobel Lindsay
Party	Labour	Conservative	SNP
Popular vote	20,530	17,418	3,799
Percentage	47.4%	40.2%	8.8%
Swing	▲4.1%	▲2.6%	▼4.4%
MP before election
John Mackintosh
Labour
Elected MP
John Home Robertson
Labour

The 1978 Berwick and East Lothian by-election was a by-election held for the House of Commons constituency of Berwick and East Lothian in Scotland on 26 October 1978. It was one of two UK parliamentary by-elections held on that day, and was won by the Labour Party candidate John Home Robertson.

== Vacancy ==
The seat had become vacant when the Labour Member of Parliament (MP), John Mackintosh had died at the age of 48 on 30 July 1978. He had held the seat since the October 1974 general election, having previously been MP for the seat between 1966 and the February 1974 election.

== Candidates ==
The Labour candidate was 29-year-old John Home Robertson, a farmer who had been a member of Berwickshire District Council since 1974. The Conservative Party candidate was Margaret Marshall. The Liberals selected Tam Glen.

The Scottish National Party (SNP) fielded Isobel Lindsay. The SNP national leadership chose her as the candidate, which party rules entitled them to do, but tension arose locally from the choice not to endorse the person who the local SNP organisation had selected to fight the next general election.

On the eve of the poll the Conservatives, including Margaret Marshall, reportedly had high hopes of victory and the Glasgow Herald predicted that failure to win the seat would be 'seen as in many quarters as an unmitigated disaster' for the Conservative Party in Scotland. Labour however felt the SNP vote would be reduced with many SNP voters switching to them. John Home Robertson talked of making the seat safe for Labour, but others in the party were described as being 'wary of their chances'. Isobel Lindsay expected to increase the SNP vote, while Tam Glen also was confident that the Liberal vote would rise.

== Result ==
The result was a victory for Robertson, with an increased majority of 3,112 votes. This was well against the general trend of by-elections in the 1974-79 Parliament, which had been against Labour. It also saw a decline in the SNP vote, continuing a trend at a few other elections earlier in the year. Lindsay and Glen lost their deposits.

Robertson held the seat until its abolition for the 1983 general election, when he was returned for the new East Lothian constituency. He went on to represent the Scottish Parliament constituency of East Lothian.

Berwick and East Lothian by-election, 1978
Party	Candidate	Votes	%	±%
Labour	John Home Robertson	20,530	47.4	+4.1
Conservative	Margaret Marshall	17,418	40.2	+2.6
SNP	Isobel Lindsay	3,799	8.8	−4.4
Liberal	Tam Glen	1,543	3.6	−2.3
Majority		3,112	7.2	+1.5
Turnout		43,290		
Labour hold		Swing	+0.8	

== Previous result ==
General election October 1974: Berwick and East Lothian
Party	Candidate	Votes	%	±%
Labour	John Mackintosh	20,682	43.3	+1.0
Conservative	Michael Ancram	17,942	37.6	−5.8
SNP	R. Macleod	6,323	13.2	−1.0
Liberal	C.F. Lawson	2,811	5.9	New
Majority		2,740	5.7	N/A
Turnout		47,758	80.8	−5.0
Labour gain from Conservative		Swing	+3.4	

== See also ==
- Berwick and East Lothian constituency
- List of United Kingdom by-elections (1950–1979)
- 1978 Pontefract and Castleford by-election
