= David Millar (civil servant) =

Civil servant and parliamentary expert (1929–2016)

- Occupation: Civil servant

David Millar OBE (1929 – 2016) was a Scottish civil servant who contributed to the work of three parliaments. His experience of the UK House of Commons (1953-1973) and of the European Parliament (1973-1989) led to his drafting the Standing Orders for the future Scottish Parliament. The draft document co-authored with Sir Bernard Crick proposed working methods that diverged from the Westminster model, and several of these were adopted by the newly-formed Scottish Parliament in 1999.

== Biography ==
=== Early life ===
David Millar was born and educated in Edinburgh, attending Melville College and graduating in History from the University of Edinburgh. His obituary notes a life-long friendship with John Mackintosh, a fellow pro-European and advocate of political devolution, whose quotation Millar later suggested for engraving in the Scottish Parliament building

=== Civil Service career ===
David Millar's professional life centred on the operation of parliaments, helping MPs to navigate the legislative procedures as a clerk in the House of Commons in London until 1973 and, after the UK joined the European Economic Community, rising to become the Director of Research in the equivalent part of the European Parliament, based in Luxembourg.

The transition to direct elections was among his early work for the European Parliament in 1974-76, a project that was led by the Dutch socialist Schelto Patijn. Members elected to national parliaments had previously been appointed to the European level. From 1979, Europeans elected their MEPs directly, marking "a historic step" beyond the commercial focus of the Common Market and towards a political European Union.

After retiring to Scotland in 1990, David Millar shared his experience in parliaments at the University of Edinburgh, teaching at the Europa Institute, and publishing on political theory and practice. He was soon planning for a possible Scottish Parliament, while the political momentum for devolution grew in the Scottish Constitutional Convention. An initial paper for the Labour-backed thinktank, the John Wheatley Centre in 1991 was followed by a fresh commission to draft Standing Orders for a Scottish Parliament in 1995, and by appointment to the Government's Expert Panel on Procedures and Standing Orders in the Scottish Parliament in 1998, advising the Consultative Steering Group.

The ambition of the Crick-Millar proposals, born in part from the contrast between the Westminster and European Parliaments, was noted as a system in which the executive "need not and should not have such total domination over the legislative process as has evolved at Westminster". The standing orders were intended to play an important role in taking "a unique opportunity for Scotland to devise procedures more suited to its own civic tradition and the 21st century".

The proposals that were subsequently adopted include:

- parliamentary committees structured such that "Committee loyalty in short will be stronger than party loyalty."
- electronic communications (such as webcasting) to link parliamentarians to the people
- the electronic, public petitions (implemented in the E-petitioner system), admired elsewhere, and on which Millar was called to provide expert testimony to a House of Lords Select Committee

The Crick-Millar papers were noted as a success and influence of the John Wheatley Centre.

Review of the parliamentary procedures has continued, with substantial changes to the committees, and broadly in the 2016 Commission on Parliamentary Reform.

== Philosophical and/or political views ==
Millar supported the Liberal Democrats, once standing for the party as a candidate for election to the European Parliament.

== Published works ==
With Prof Sir Bernard Crick,

- Making Scotland's Parliament Work. John Wheatley Centre (July 1991).
- To make the Parliament of Scotland a model for democracy. John Wheatley Centre (November 1995).

Other works,

- Millar, D. 1990. A Uniform Electoral Procedure for European-Elections. Elect Stud 9:37-44. Doi 10.1016/0261-3794(90)90040-F
- Millar, D. 1992. Subsidiarity - the Challenge of Change - Proceedings of the Jacques-Delors-Colloquium. J Common Mark Stud 30:371-2
- Scott, A, Peterson J, Millar D. 1994. Subsidiarity - a Europe of the Regions Versus the British Constitution. J Common Mark Stud 32:47-67
- Millar, D. 1996. Orchestrating Europe: The informal politics of the European Union 1973-95 - Middlemas, K. Polit Quart 67:279-81. DOI 10.1111/j.1468-5965.1994.tb00484.x
- Millar, D. 1997. Regional government in England - Constitution-Unit. Polit Quart 68:213-5
- Millar, D. 1997. Scotland's parliament: Fundamentals for a new Scotland act - Constitution-Unit. Polit Quart 68:213-5
- Millar, D. 1999. Political theory of European constitutional choice. Polit Quart 70:116-8
- Millar, D. 2002. Federal union, from Scotland with love Accessed 17 Sept 2017

== Honours, decorations, awards and distinctions ==
In the 1989 Birthday Honours, Millar was appointed OBE for his work at the European Parliament.

== See also ==
- Parliamentary procedure
- House of Commons
- European Parliament
- Scottish Parliament
