= Sinkinson =

Sinkinson is a surname. Notable people with this surname include:

- Brett Sinkinson (born 1971), New Zealand-born rugby union player for Wales
- Daniel Sinkinson (born 2001), New Zealand rugby union player
- George Sinkinson (1874–1939), British politician
