= Ann Macintosh =

UK academic

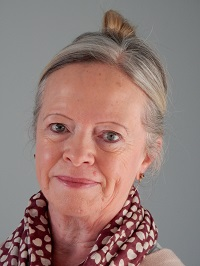
- Occupations: Media researcher, educator

Ann Macintosh is emeritus professor of digital governance at the University of Leeds.

== Early life and education ==
Macintosh has a bachelor's degree from University of St Andrews.

== Career ==
In 1999 Macintosh founded the International Teledemocracy Centre (ITC) at Edinburgh Napier University to support interdisciplinary research into eGovernment and eDemocracy. (The term Teledemocracy was not strongly associated with direct democracy at that time.)

Among other projects, from 1999, Macintosh led a collaboration between the ITC, The Scottish Parliament and BT Scotland to create an e-petitions system (e-petitioner). ITC later integrated this with the Parliament's Public Petitions Committee and the Parliament's website. This led to a number of projects, investigating the implementation of e-petitions systems, including continuing to work with the Scottish Parliament, working with the German Bundestag, and working with local authorities in England.

Macintosh led or collaborated in a series of research projects, at the ITC, both theoretical and applied, in the areas of eGovernment and eParticipation, until 2007. She also acted as a specialist advisor for the OECD, the Council for Europe and the Commonwealth Secretariat.

In 2002, Macintosh became the UK's first Professor of e-Governance.

In 2007, Macintosh moved to Leeds University to establish and co-direct the Centre for Digital Citizenship, with Stephen Coleman, in the Institute of Communications Studies (now School of Media and Communication). Macintosh's involvement in high-profile eParticipation collaborations continued at Leeds. Macintosh has also been working with Craven and Harrogate Districts Citizens Advice Bureau on digital access and Universal credit.

Macintosh instigated research into evaluating eParticipation, creating frameworks which reflected the importance of social, political and technical elements.

Macintosh co-founded the IFIP International Conference on eParticipation.

== Honors and awards ==
She has an honorary PhD from Örebro University (2009) for recognition of her work in eParticipation.

== Key publications ==
- Tambouris, E., Macintosh. A., Smith, S.O., Panopoulou, E., Tarabanis, K. and Millard, J. (2012). Understanding eParticipation State of Play in Europe, Information Systems Management. 29 (4). pp. 321–330.
- Smith, S., Macintosh, A. and Millard, J. (2011). A three-layered framework for evaluating e-participation, International Journal of Electronic Governance. 4 (4). pp. 304–321.
- Macintosh, A., Gordon, T. and Renton, A. (2009). Providing Argument Support for EParticipation, Journal of Information Technology & Politics. 6 (1). pp. 43–59.
- Xenakis, A. and Macintosh, A. (2008). A Framework for the Analysis of Procedural Security of the e-Electoral Process, International Journal of Public Administration. 31 (8).pp. 1–15.
- Macintosh, A. (2006). eParticipation in Policy-making: the research and the challenges. In P. Cunningham and M. Cunningham (eds.) Exploiting the Knowledge Economy: Issues, Applications and Case Studies. Amsterdam: IOS press. pp. 364–369.
- Macintosh, A. and Whyte, A. (2006). Evaluating how eParticipation changes local democracy. eGovernment Workshop ’06 (eGOV06), September 11, 2006, Brunel University, London.
- Macintosh, A. (2004). Characterizing E-Participation in Policy-Making Proceedings of the Thirty-Seventh Annual Hawaii International Conference on System Sciences (HICSS-37); Big Island, Hawaii, January 5–8, 2004
- Macintosh, A., Malina, A., and Farrell, S. (2002). Digital Democracy through Electronic Petitioning. In W. McIver and A.K. Elmagarmid (eds). Advances in Digital Government: Technology, Human Factors, and Policy. Boston/Dordrecht/London: Kluwer Academic Publishers. pp. 137–148.

== Selected projects ==
- 2010-2012 IMPACT: Integrated Method for Policy making using Argument modelling and Computer assisted Text analysis. European Commission(FP7 247228), University of Leeds, with Fraunhofer, University of Amsterdam, University of Liverpool, User Interface Design GMBH and Zebralog GmbH & Co KG.
- 2008-2009 Study and supply of services on the development of eParticipation in the EU (Contract number 30-CE-0132840/00-38, University of Leeds, with the Danish Technological Institute and the University of Macedonia (Greece). Final report.
- 2006-2008 DEMO-Net – Network of Excellence on eParticipation: European Commission (FP6-2004-027219). This large-scale collaboration brought together many of the main research centres interested in eParticipation in Europe, before it was closed.
- 2005-2006 Computer Supported Argument Visualisation.
- 2004-2006 e-community council funded by the Scottish Executive.
- 2004- 2006 (UK) Local eDemocracy National Project. Evaluation;e-Petitioner for English Local Authorities.
- e-Petitioning projects (See references below for external evaluations): e-Petitioner for English Local Authorities 2004-6; e-Petitioning for the German Bundestag 2005-8; e-Petitioning for the Scottish Parliament 2003-7; e-Petitioning the Scottish Parliament 1999-2003.
- e-Consultations: What sort of Scotland do we want to live in? (2001); Youth Summit 2000; Education for Citizenship in Scotland (2000-2001).
