= William Anstruther-Gray, Baron Kilmany =

Scottish Unionist Party politician

The Right Honourable The Lord Kilmany MC PC
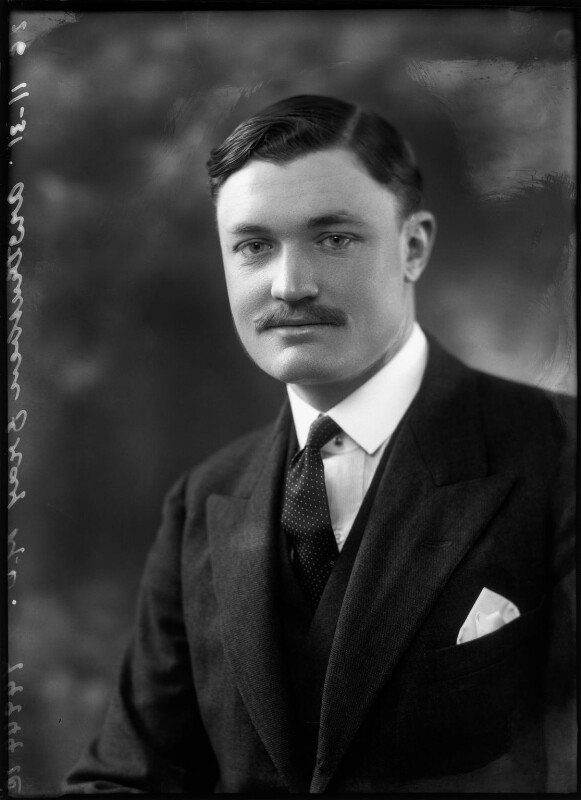
- Anstruther-Gray in 1931

Chair of the 1922 Committee
- In office 19 November 1964 – 31 March 1966
- Leader: Alec Douglas-Home; Edward Heath
- Preceded by: John Morrison
- Succeeded by: Arthur Vere Harvey

Deputy Speaker of the House of Commons Chairman of Ways and Means
- In office 30 January 1962 – 3 November 1964
- Speaker: Harry Hylton-Foster
- Preceded by: Gordon Touche
- Succeeded by: Horace King

Deputy Chairman of Ways and Means
- In office 29 October 1959 – 30 January 1962
- Speaker: Harry Hylton-Foster
- Preceded by: Gordon Touche
- Succeeded by: Robert Grimston

Assistant Postmaster-General
- In office 23 May 1945 – 26 July 1945
- Prime Minister: Winston Churchill
- Preceded by: Robert Grimston
- Succeeded by: Wilfrid Burke

Member of Parliament for Berwick and East Lothian
- In office 25 October 1951 – 10 March 1966
- Preceded by: John Robertson
- Succeeded by: John Mackintosh

Member of Parliament for North Lanarkshire
- In office 27 October 1931 – 15 June 1945
- Preceded by: Jennie Lee
- Succeeded by: Margaret McCrorie Herbison

Personal details
- Born: William Anstruther-Gray; 5 March 1905 Cupar, Fife, Scotland
- Died: 6 August 1985 (aged 80) London, England, UK
- Party: Unionist
- Other political affiliations: Conservative
- Spouse: Monica Lambton (m. 1934)
- Parents: William Anstruther-Gray (father); Clayre Jessie Tennant (mother)
- Education: Christ Church, Oxford

Military service
- Branch/service: British Army
- Years of service: 1926–30, 1939–45
- Rank: Major
- Unit: Coldstream Guards
- Awards: Military Cross

William John St Clair Anstruther-Gray, Baron Kilmany, MC PC (5 March 1905 – 6 August 1985) was a Scottish Unionist Party politician.

== Early life and career ==
The only son of Col. William Anstruther-Gray of Kilmany and Clayre Jessie Tennant, he was born in Cupar, Fife, Scotland, and was educated at Eton College and at Christ Church, Oxford.

=== Military service ===
He served as a Lieutenant in the Coldstream Guards from 1926-30, and with the Shanghai Defence Force in 1927–28.

In September 1939, he rejoined the Coldstream Guards and served in North Africa, France and Germany with Coldstream Guards and Lothians and Border Horse. Anstruther-Gray was promoted to the rank of Major in 1942. He was awarded the Military Cross in 1943.

== Political career ==
He was elected as Unionist Member of Parliament for North Lanarkshire, in Scotland, at the 1931 UK general election, holding the seat until 1945. Until September 1939, he served as Parliamentary Private Secretary to Financial Secretary to the Treasury, and to Secretary for Overseas Trade, and latterly to Sir John Colville, Secretary of State for Scotland.

He served as Assistant Postmaster-General from May–July 1945. He unsuccessfully contested Berwick and East Lothian at the 1950 United Kingdom general election, and was elected for the seat at the subsequent general election held the following year, holding it until he lost his seat to John Mackintosh of the Labour Party in 1966. He was Chairman of Ways and Means and Deputy Speaker of the House of Commons from 1962-64 (having been Deputy Chairman from 1959-62). He was Chairman of the 1922 Committee from 1964-66.

He was appointed Deputy lieutenant of Fife in 1953, and Lord Lieutenant of Fife from 1975 to 1980. He was also the Crown nominee for Scotland on the General Medical Council from 1952-65.

He was created a baronet in 1956, appointed a Privy Counsellor in the 1962 Birthday Honours.

Upon his defeat at the 1966 election, he was created a life peer as Baron Kilmany, of Kilmany in the County of Fife.

== Family ==
In 1934, Anstruther-Gray married Monica Helen Lambton (1915-1985), only child of Geoffrey Lambton, second son of Frederick Lambton, 4th Earl of Durham. They had two children.

On 22 July 1985, Anstruther-Gray collapsed in the Lords chamber, and died in Westminster Hospital on 6 August, aged 80.

Parliament of the United Kingdom
Preceded by Jennie Lee	Member of Parliament for North Lanarkshire; 1931–1945	Succeeded by Margaret McCrorie Herbison
Preceded by John James Robertson	Member of Parliament for Berwick and East Lothian; 1951–1966	Succeeded by John Mackintosh
Political offices
Preceded by John Morrison	Chairman of the 1922 Committee; 1964–1966	Succeeded by Sir Arthur Vere Harvey
Baronetage of the United Kingdom
New creation	Baronet (of Kilmany); 1956–1985	Extinct
Honorary titles
Preceded by John McWilliam	Lord Lieutenant of Fife; 1975–1980	Succeeded by Sir John Gilmour, 3rd Baronet
