= 1978 Pontefract and Castleford by-election =

UK parliamentary by-election

A 1978 by-election was held for the House of Commons parliamentary constituency of Pontefract and Castleford on 26 October 1978 following the death of Labour Member of Parliament (MP) Joseph Harper on 24 June. It was one of two UK parliamentary by-elections held on that day.

The result was a Labour hold. The party's majority was reduced from the 54.2% at the October 1974 general election to a still comfortable 38.5%. Both Labour and Liberal Party candidates saw their votes fall, the latter's share of the vote being nearly halved.

The winner, Geoffrey Lofthouse, served as the constituency's MP until his retirement at the 1997 general election.

== Result ==
Pontefract and Castleford by-election, 1978
Party	Candidate	Votes	%	±%
Labour	Geoffrey Lofthouse	19,508	65.8	−4.6
Conservative	Hugo Page	8,080	27.3	+11.1
Liberal	Leslie Marsh	2,054	6.9	−5.4
Majority		11,428	38.5	−15.7
Turnout		29,642		
Labour hold		Swing	-7.9	

== See also ==
- Pontefract and Castleford (UK Parliament constituency)
- List of United Kingdom by-elections (1950–1979)
- 1978 Berwick and East Lothian by-election
