= Berwick and East Lothian =

Parliamentary constituency in the United Kingdom, 1950–1983

- Former county constituency for the House of Commons
- Subdivisions of Scotland: Berwickshire, East Lothian

1950–1983
- Seats: One
- Created from: Berwick and Haddington
- Replaced by: East Lothian; Roxburgh & Berwickshire; Tweeddale, Ettrick & Lauderdale

Berwick and East Lothian was a constituency of the House of Commons of the Parliament of the United Kingdom. It elected one Member of Parliament (MP), using the first-past-the-post system.

== History ==
The constituency was created in 1950 and abolished in 1983.

== Boundaries ==
Berwick and East Lothian covered the counties of Berwickshire and East Lothian. It was largely created from Berwick and Haddington and was replaced by East Lothian and part of Roxburgh and Berwickshire for the 1983 general election.

== Members of Parliament ==
Election	Member	Party
1950	John Robertson	Labour
1951	William Anstruther-Gray	Unionist
1966	John Mackintosh	Labour
Feb 1974	Michael Ancram	Conservative
Oct 1974	John Mackintosh	Labour
1978 by-election	John Home Robertson	Labour
1983	constituency abolished	

== Elections ==
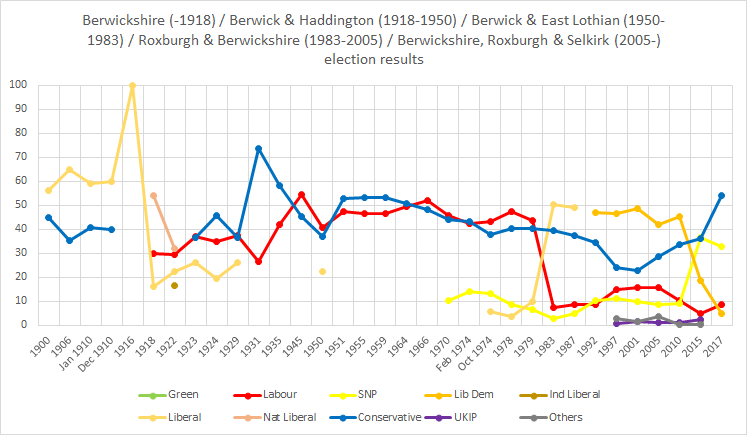
Berwickshire constituencies electoral history

=== Elections in the 1950s ===
General election 1950: Berwick and East Lothian
Party	Candidate	Votes	%	±%
Labour	John Robertson	17,105	40.9	
Unionist	William Anstruther-Gray	15,377	36.8	
Liberal	Anthony Stodart	9,352	22.4	
Majority		1,728	4.1	
Turnout		41,834	82.8	
Labour win (new seat)				

General election 1951: Berwick and East Lothian
Party	Candidate	Votes	%	±%
Unionist	William Anstruther-Gray	22,510	52.8	+16.0
Labour	John Robertson	20,152	47.2	+6.3
Majority		2,358	5.6	N/A
Turnout		42,662	83.8	+1.0
Unionist gain from Labour		Swing	+2.8	

General election 1955: Berwick and East Lothian
Party	Candidate	Votes	%	±%
Unionist	William Anstruther-Gray	21,739	53.3	+0.5
Labour	Penry Jones	19,029	46.7	−0.5
Majority		2,710	6.6	+1.0
Turnout		40,768	80.3	−3.5
Unionist hold		Swing	+0.5	

General election 1959: Berwick and East Lothian
Party	Candidate	Votes	%	±%
Unionist	William Anstruther-Gray	22,472	53.4	+0.1
Labour	Penry Jones	19,622	46.6	−0.1
Majority		2,850	6.8	+0.2
Turnout		42,094	83.2	+2.9
Unionist hold		Swing	+0.1	

=== Elections in the 1960s ===
General election 1964: Berwick and East Lothian
Party	Candidate	Votes	%	±%
Unionist	William Anstruther-Gray	21,669	50.7	−2.7
Labour	John Mackintosh	21,044	49.3	+2.7
Majority		625	1.4	−5.4
Turnout		42,713	85.0	+1.8
Unionist hold		Swing	−2.7	

General election 1966: Berwick and East Lothian
Party	Candidate	Votes	%	±%
Labour	John Mackintosh	22,620	51.9	+2.6
Conservative	William Anstruther-Gray	20,931	48.1	−2.6
Majority		1,689	3.8	N/A
Turnout		43,551	86.1	+1.1
Labour gain from Conservative		Swing	+2.6	

=== Elections in the 1970s ===
General election 1970: Berwick and East Lothian
Party	Candidate	Votes	%	±%
Labour	John Mackintosh	21,107	45.6	−6.3
Conservative	J. Donald M. Hardie	20,466	44.2	−3.9
SNP	David Rae Fisher Simpson	4,735	10.2	New
Majority		641	1.4	−2.4
Turnout		46,308	83.7	−2.4
Labour hold		Swing		

General election February 1974: Berwick and East Lothian
Party	Candidate	Votes	%	±%
Conservative	Michael Ancram	21,234	43.4	−0.8
Labour	John Mackintosh	20,694	42.3	−3.3
SNP	David Rae Fisher Simpson	6,956	14.2	+4.0
Majority		540	1.1	N/A
Turnout		48,884	85.8	+2.1
Conservative gain from Labour		Swing	+1.3	

General election October 1974: Berwick and East Lothian
Party	Candidate	Votes	%	±%
Labour	John Mackintosh	20,682	43.3	+1.0
Conservative	Michael Ancram	17,942	37.6	−5.8
SNP	R. Macleod	6,323	13.2	−1.0
Liberal	C. F. Lawson	2,811	5.9	New
Majority		2,740	5.7	N/A
Turnout		47,758	80.8	−5.0
Labour gain from Conservative		Swing	+3.4	

1978 Berwick and East Lothian by-election
Party	Candidate	Votes	%	±%
Labour	John Home Robertson	20,530	47.4	+4.1
Conservative	Margaret Marshall	17,418	40.2	+2.6
SNP	Isobel Lindsay	3,799	8.8	−4.4
Liberal	Tam Glen	1,543	3.6	−2.3
Majority		3,112	7.2	+1.5
Turnout		43,290		
Labour hold		Swing	+0.8	

General election 1979: Berwick and East Lothian
Party	Candidate	Votes	%	±%
Labour	John Home Robertson	21,977	43.5	+0.2
Conservative	Margaret Marshall	20,304	40.2	+2.6
Liberal	Tam Glen	4,948	9.8	+3.9
SNP	Allan Macartney	3,300	6.5	−6.7
Majority		1,673	3.3	−2.4
Turnout		60,919	82.9	+2.1
Labour hold		Swing		
