= Una Maclean =

British physician and author (1925–2012)

- Born: Catherine Margaret Una Maclean; 3 July 1925; Applecross, Scotland
- Died: 1 September 2012 (aged 87); Glasgow, Scotland
- Education: Dingwall Academy; University of Edinburgh, MB (1949), DPH (1964), MD (1965), and PhD (1967)
- Occupations: physician, author, lecturer
- Spouses: Dr Peter Cockshott; John Pitcairn Mackintosh (m. 1963; died 1978)
- Partner: Sir Bernard Rowland Crick
- Children: 5 (2 stepchildren)

Catherine Margaret Una Maclean FRCP (3 July 1925 – 1 September 2012) was a Scottish physician in Aden, Yemen, and Ibadan, Nigeria, as well as an author and long-time lecturer in social medicine at the University of Edinburgh.

== Early life ==
Una Maclean was born on 3 July 1925, in Applecross, Wester Ross. The daughter of Reverend C. Maclean and his wife, she was raised in a deeply religious environment which led her to become a staunch atheist and humanist throughout the rest of her life. Attending Dingwall Academy, she continued her studies at the University of Edinburgh, from which she graduated at the top of her class with an MB in 1949. This degree was later followed by a D.Ph. (1964), an MD (1965), and a PhD (1967).

== Career ==
Following graduation, she married Peter Cockshott, with whom she had her first child, a son. In 1952, her growing family relocated to the Aden Protectorate, where – being the only female doctor – she took up a post caring for Muslim women living in harems of local traders. During this time, she gave birth to her second child, a daughter. A second posting, this time in Ibadan, Nigeria, allowed her to apply her medical knowledge more fully, persuading local doctors to allow their patients to benefit from western medicine. A third child, a second son, was born here. During this time, she met John Mackintosh, to whom she was married from 1963 until his death in 1978.

Returning to Scotland, Una Maclean took up a lecturing post in the Department of Community Medicine at the University of Edinburgh, where she taught for twenty-three years. Her main research interests concerned cancer research, blood transfusion, and smallpox. She died on 1 September 2012, aged 87, in Glasgow.

== Selected publications ==
Una Maclean was a prolific writer, publishing five books and more than fifty peer-reviewed articles over the course of her career.

=== Books ===
- Magical medicine: a Nigerian case-study (1971).
- Social and community medicine for students (1971).
- Nursing in Contemporary Society (1974).
- Heart attack: survival, recovery, prevention (1981).
- Dependent territories: the frail elderly and community care (1989).

=== Articles ===
- Three views of The swamp dwellers (1959).
- The Usher Institute and the evolution of community medicine in Edinburgh (1975).
- Folk medicine and fertility: aspects of Yoruba medical practice affecting women (1982).
