= Berwick and Haddington =

Parliamentary constituency in the United Kingdom, 1918–1950

- Former county constituency for the House of Commons
- Subdivision: Berwickshire, East Lothian

1918–1950
- Seats: One
- Created from: Berwickshire and Haddingtonshire
- Replaced by: Berwick and East Lothian

Berwick and Haddington was a constituency of the House of Commons of the Parliament of the United Kingdom from 1918, when it replaced the separate Berwickshire and Haddingtonshire constituencies, until it was renamed Berwick and East Lothian for the 1950 general election. It elected one Member of Parliament (MP), using the first-past-the-post voting system.

The constituency covered the counties of Berwickshire and East Lothian.

== Members of Parliament ==
Election	Member	Party
1918	John Hope	Coalition Liberal
Jan 1922	John Hope	National Liberal
Oct 1922	John Hope	Independent Liberal
Nov 1922	Walter Waring	National Liberal
Nov 1923	Walter Waring	Liberal
Dec 1923	Robert Spence	Labour
1924	Chichester Crookshank	Unionist
1929	George Sinkinson	Labour
1931	John McEwen	Unionist
1945	John Robertson	Labour
1950	constituency abolished	

== Election results ==
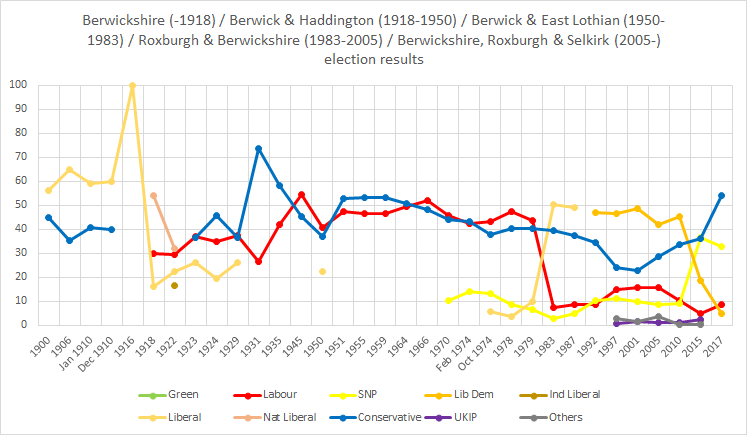
Berwickshire constituencies electoral history

=== Elections in the 1910s ===
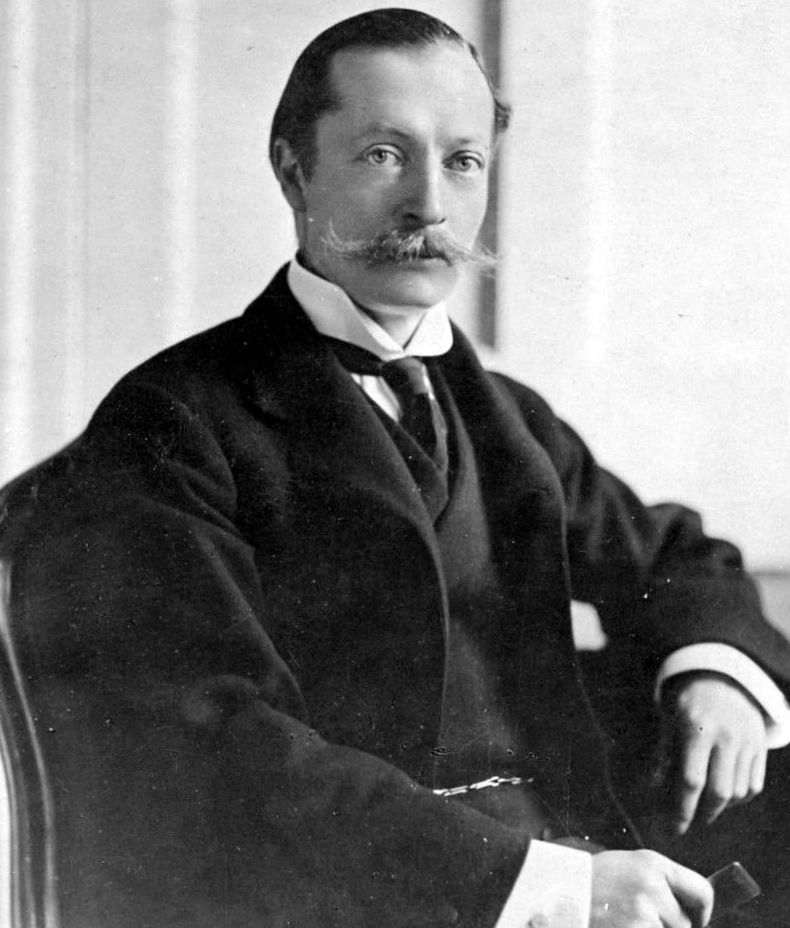
Tennant

General election 1918: Berwick and Haddington
Party		Candidate	Votes	%
C	National Liberal	John Hope	8,584	53.9
	Labour	Robert W. Foulis	4,783	30.0
	Liberal	Harold Tennant	2,557	16.1
Majority			3,801	23.9
Turnout			15,924	48.6
Registered electors			32,763	
	National Liberal win (new seat)			
C indicates candidate endorsed by the coalition government.

=== Elections in the 1920s ===
Walter Waring

J.D. Hope

General election 1922: Berwick and Haddington
Party	Candidate	Votes	%	±%
National Liberal (Unionist)	Walter Waring	6,342	31.9	–22.0
Labour	Robert Spence	5,842	29.3	−0.7
Liberal	William Henderson Pringle	4,422	22.2	+6.1
Independent Liberal	John Hope	3,300	16.6	New
Majority		500	2.6	N/A
Turnout		19,906	60.1	+11.5
Registered electors		33,119		
National Liberal hold		Swing		

General election 1923: Berwick and Haddington
Party	Candidate	Votes	%	±%
Labour	Robert Spence	8,576	37.0	+7.7
Unionist	Chichester Crookshank	8,508	36.7	N/A
Liberal	Walter Waring	6,084	26.3	+4.1
Majority		68	0.3	N/A
Turnout		23,168	69.4	+9.3
Registered electors		33,381		
Labour gain from Liberal		Swing	+1.8	

General election 1924: Berwick and Haddington
Party	Candidate	Votes	%	±%
Unionist	Chichester Crookshank	11,745	45.8	+9.1
Labour	Robert Spence	8,882	34.7	−2.3
Liberal	William Henderson Pringle	4,986	19.5	−6.8
Majority		2,863	11.1	N/A
Turnout		25,613	75.3	+5.9
Registered electors		34,017		
Unionist gain from Labour		Swing	+5.7	

Sir James Greig

General election 1929: Berwick and Haddington
Party	Candidate	Votes	%	±%
Labour	George Sinkinson	11,761	37.5	+2.8
Unionist	John McEwen	11,435	36.5	−9.3
Liberal	James Greig	8,132	26.0	+6.5
Majority		326	1.0	N/A
Turnout		31,328	69.6	−5.7
Registered electors		45,043		
Labour gain from Unionist		Swing	+6.1	

=== Elections in the 1930s ===
General election 1931: Berwick and Haddington
Party	Candidate	Votes	%	±%
Unionist	John McEwen	25,169	73.5	+36.0
Labour	George Sinkinson	9,089	26.5	−11.0
Majority		16,080	47.0	N/A
Turnout		34,258	74.8	+5.2
Unionist gain from Labour		Swing		

General election 1935: Berwick and Haddington
Party	Candidate	Votes	%	±%
Unionist	John McEwen	19,839	58.1	−15.4
Labour	J.J. Fraser	14,299	41.9	+15.4
Majority		5,540	16.2	−30.8
Turnout		34,138	71.9	−2.9
Unionist hold		Swing		

General Election 1939–40

Another General Election was required to take place before the end of 1940. The political parties had been making preparations for an election to take place and by the Autumn of 1939, the following candidates had been selected;

- Unionist: John McEwen
- Labour: John Robertson
- Liberal:

=== Elections in the 1940s ===
General election 1945: Berwick and Haddington
Party	Candidate	Votes	%	±%
Labour	John Robertson	19,037	54.52	
Unionist	John McEwen	15,880	45.48	
Majority		3,157	9.04	N/A
Turnout		34,917	70.51	
Labour gain from Unionist		Swing		
