= Lochaber High School =

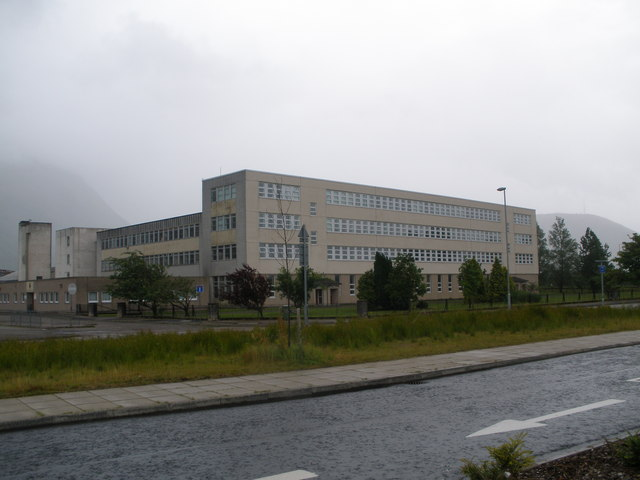
- View in July 2009

Location
- Camaghael; Fort William, Highland, PH33 7ND; Scotland

Information
- Type: Comprehensive
- Established: 1960
- Local authority: Highland
- Head teacher: Scott Steele
- Gender: Mixed
- Age: 11 to 18
- Enrolment: 862
- Houses: Rannoch, Shiel, Nevis, Locheil
- Colours: Black and red
- Website: www.lochaberhigh.org

Lochaber High School is a six-year comprehensive secondary school located in the town of Fort William, Lochaber, in the Highland region of Scotland.

The current Head Teacher is Scott Steele.

== Associated primary schools ==
There are eleven primary schools in the area:

Banavie, Caol, Invergarry, Inverlochy, St Columba, Spean Bridge. Fort William primary and Upper Achintore primary were merged in August 2015 and, along with Fort William RC, form Lundavra Primary. A new Gaelic-medium school was opened at Caol. The High School operates a Transition week in the middle of June.

NB Arisaig, Lady Lovat and Mallaig primaries are all situated in the Mallaig and Morar area and pupils attend Mallaig High School. Duror, St Brides (Onich/North Ballachulish) and Kinlochleven primaries attend Kinlochleven High School. Kilchoan, Acharacle, Strontian, Lochaline, and Ardgour primaries attend Ardnamurchan High School in Strontian.

== History ==
Lochaber High School was founded in 1960. It also served the fishing communities near Mallaig prior to the opening of its high school. As the only high school in the area, it is affiliated with primary schools and takes in pupils from villages and settlements around Fort William. Lochaber High is owned and operated by The Highland Council.

In September 2001 pupils appeared as extras in Harry Potter and the Chamber of Secrets for scenes on a train (GWR 4900 Class 5972 Olton Hall with six coaches from The Jacobite on the Glenfinnan Viaduct).

In May and June 2003 90 pupils were extras in the film Harry Potter and the Prisoner of Azkaban, the third Harry Potter film, but any fees paid to them on a school day went into Lochaber High School's account. This was around £2,500 in total. Filming took place in Glencoe.

== Notable alumni ==
- Danny Alexander - Lib Dem MP 2005-2015 for Inverness, Nairn, Badenoch and Strathspey and former Chief Secretary to the Treasury and Secretary of State for Scotland
- Tom Ballard, mountaineer, first solo winter ascent of the six major alpine north faces in a single season
- Kate Bracken - actress, guest appearances in Inspector George Gently, New Tricks and playing female lead, Alex, in BBC3's Being Human
- John Finnie, Member of the Scottish Parliament (MSP) for the Highlands and Islands region
- Barry Hutchison - author and screenwriter
- Gary Innes - Musician and shinty player
- Charles Kennedy - Lib Dem MP 2005-2015 for Ross, Skye and Lochaber, from 1997 to 2005 for Ross, Skye and Inverness West, and from 1983 to 1997 for Ross, Cromarty and Skye (SDP from 1983 to 1988), and Leader of the Liberal Democrats from 1999 to 2006
- Carol Kirkwood, BBC weather presenter
- John McGinlay, footballer
- Hugh Dan MacLennan - broadcaster, author and sporting academic
- Jason MacIntyre – racing cyclist
- Fiona O'Donnell - former Labour MP for East Lothian
- Donald Park - football coach and former player
- Justin Ryan, TV presenter and interior designer
- Duncan Shearer, footballer
- Finlay Wild, hill runner and ski mountaineer
- Katie Dougan, rugby player
