= Sir John McEwen, 1st Baronet =

British politician (1894–1962)

Sir John McEwen Bt

Government Deputy Chief Whip in the House of Commons
- In office 13 March 1942 – 6 December 1944 Serving with Leslie Pym; William John
- Prime Minister: Winston Churchill
- Preceded by: Thomas Dugdale; William Whiteley
- Succeeded by: James Edmondson; Leslie Pym; William John

Lord Commissioner of the Treasury
- In office 13 March 1942 – 6 December 1944
- Prime Minister: Winston Churchill
- Preceded by: William Boulton
- Succeeded by: Patrick Buchan-Hepburn

Under-Secretary of State for Scotland
- In office 6 September 1939 – 17 May 1940
- Prime Minister: Neville Chamberlain
- Preceded by: Henry Wedderburn
- Succeeded by: Joseph Westwood

Member of Parliament for Berwick and Haddington
- In office 27 October 1931 – 26 July 1945
- Preceded by: George Sinkinson
- Succeeded by: John Robertson

Personal details
- Born: John Helias Finnie McEwen; 21 June 1894
- Died: 19 March 1962 (aged 67)
- Party: Conservative
- Spouse: Brigid Mary Lindley (m. 1923)
- Children: 7, including Rory, Mary
- Parent(s): Robert Finnie McEwen; Mary Frances Dundas
- Education: Eton College
- Alma mater: Trinity College, Cambridge

Military service
- Allegiance: United Kingdom
- Rank: Captain
- Battles/wars: World War I

Sir John Helias Finnie McEwen, 1st Baronet (21 June 1894 – 19 April 1962), also known as Jock McEwen, was a British Unionist politician who served in the House of Commons as Conservative Member of Parliament for Berwick and Haddington from the 1931 to 1945 general elections.

== Early life ==
Sir John McEwen was the son of Robert Finnie McEwen (born 1861) of Marchmont, Berwickshire, and Bardrochat, F.S.A.Scot., Deputy Lieutenant and Justice of the Peace for Berwickshire, by Mary Frances, daughter of R. H. D. Dundas. His sister, Katherine Isobel McEwen, married Roger Lumley, 11th Earl of Scarbrough, on 12 July 1922 at St Margaret's, Westminster, and had five children with him.

He was educated at Eton College and Trinity College, Cambridge.

== Career ==
During the First World War, he served in the Cameron Highlanders, being promoted captain in 1915. He transferred to the Royal Army Flying Corps and was later a prisoner of war. After the war, he joined the Diplomatic Service, and in 1920, was 3rd Secretary; 2nd Secretary in 1925, serving in the London Foreign Office, Athens and Rome.

In the 1929 general election, he contested the seat of Berwick-upon-Tweed and Haddington for the Unionist Party, but failed. However, two years later he was elected to the House of Commons as Conservative Member of Parliament (MP) for Berwick and Haddington at the 1931 general election, and held the seat until the 1945 general election, when he was defeated.

McEwen served under Neville Chamberlain as Assistant Government Whip (1938–39), Under-Secretary of State for Scotland (1939 to 1940), and under Winston Churchill as a Lord of the Treasury (1942 to 1944). He was Chairman of the Conservative Members' Committee in the House of Commons (December 1944 – June 1945).

=== Baronetcy ===
In 1953, he was created a baronet by the Queen, of Marchmont in the County of Berwick and Bardrochat in the County of Ayr. Upon his death in 1962, his title passed to his eldest son, Sir James. Upon Sir James' death in 1971, his title passed to his brother and Sir John's second son, Sir Robert, as Sir James had three daughters, but no sons. The current holder of the title is his grandson, Sir John Roderick Hugh McEwen, 5th Baronet (born 1965).

== Personal life ==
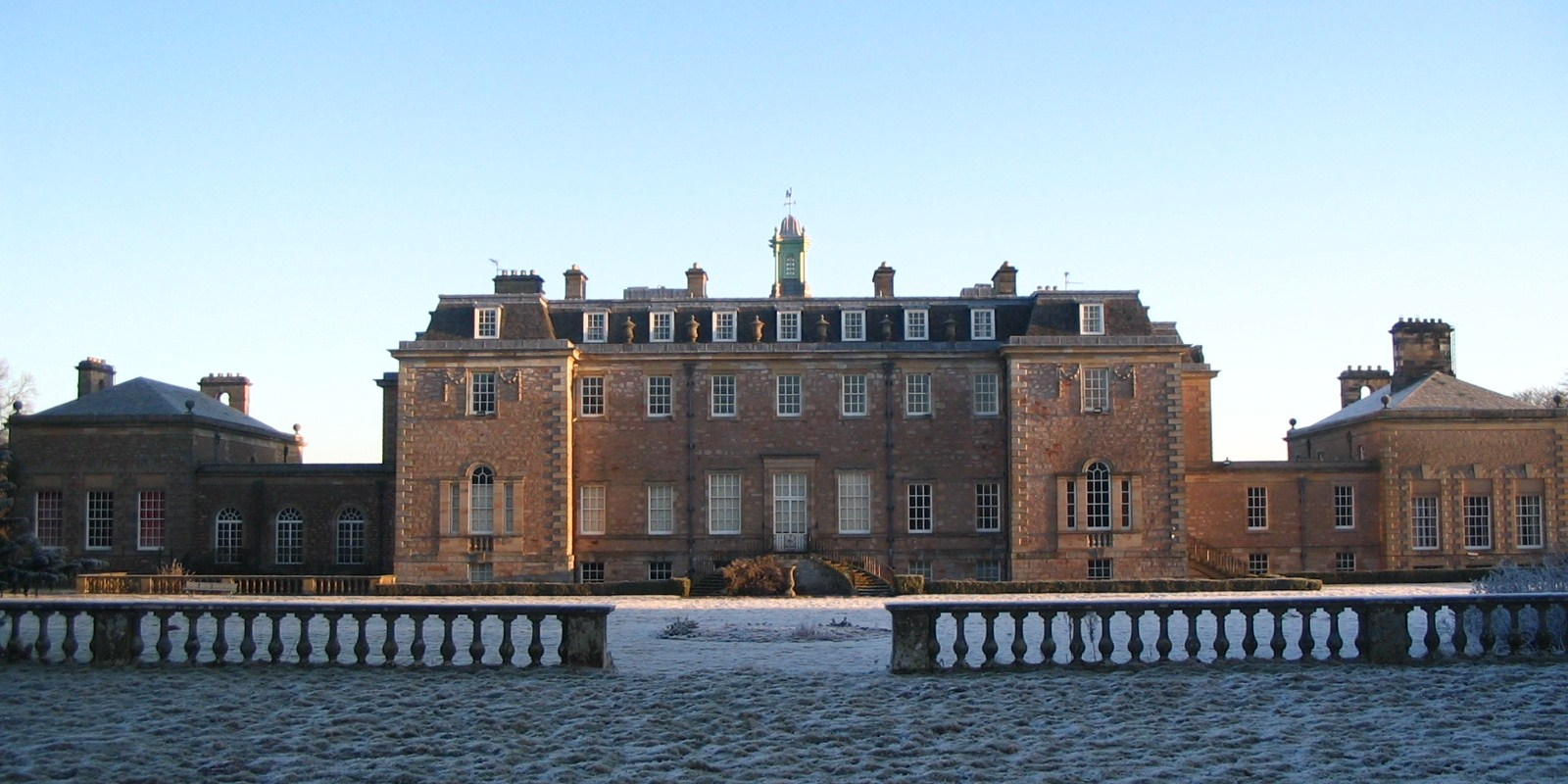
Marchmont House, the McEwen home

In 1923, McEwen married Brigid Mary Lindley (d. 1971), daughter of Sir Francis Oswald Lindley (1872–1950), the British diplomat, and granddaughter of botanist and illustrator John Lindley, who in 1840 was instrumental in saving The Royal Botanic Gardens at Kew from destruction. The raised their family at Marchmont House on the east side of the small town of Greenlaw, Scotland. Together they had seven children, including:

- Sir James Napier Finnie McEwen of Marchmont and Bardrochat, 2nd Bt. (1924–1971), who married Clare Rosemary Sandars (1934–2007)
- Sir Robert Lindley McEwen of Marchmont and Bardrochat, 3rd Bt. (1926–1980), who married Brigid Cecilia Laver, daughter of James Laver and Veronica Turleigh
- Christian Mary McEwen (1929–2006), who married Frederick Fermor-Hesketh, 2nd Baron Hesketh (1916–1955).
- Roderick McEwen (1932–1982), a folk singer who married Romana von Hofmannsthal (1935–2014), daughter of Ava Alice Muriel Astor and her second husband, Raimund von Hofmannsthal.
- Alexander Dundas McEwen (1935–2008), a musician who married Cecilia Gräfin von Weikersheim (1937-2019), great-granddaughter of Carl Ludwig II, Prince of Hohenlohe-Langenburg (nephew of Queen Victoria)
- David Fraser McEwen (1938–1976)
- John Sebastian McEwen (b. 1942)

He died in April 1962, aged 67, and was succeeded in the baronetcy by his eldest son James.

== Arms ==
Coat of arms of Sir John McEwen, 1st Baronet

Crest
The trunk of an oak tree sprouting Proper.
Escutcheon
Quarterly 1st & 4th Or a lion rampant Azure gorged with a ducal crown Proper on a chief of the second three garbs of the field (McEwen) 2nd & 3rd Gules three headless cranes Argent (Finnie).
Motto
Reviresco

== Notes ==
Parliament of the United Kingdom
Preceded by George Sinkinson	Member of Parliament for Berwick and Haddington; 1931–1945	Succeeded by John Robertson
Political offices
Preceded by Henry Wedderburn	Under-Secretary of State for Scotland; 1939–1940	Succeeded by Joseph Westwood
Preceded by Thomas Dugdale; William Whiteley	Deputy Chief Whip of the House of Commons; 1942–1944; With: William John; Leslie Pym	Succeeded by James Edmondson; Leslie Pym; William John
Party political offices
Preceded by Thomas Dugdale	Conservative Deputy Chief Whip in the House of Commons; 1942–1944; Served alongside: Leslie Pym	Succeeded by James Edmondson; Leslie Pym
Baronetage of the United Kingdom
New creation	Baronet (of Marchmont and Bardrochat); 1953–1962	Succeeded by James Napier Finnie McEwen
