= Fiona O'Donnell =

Scottish Politician

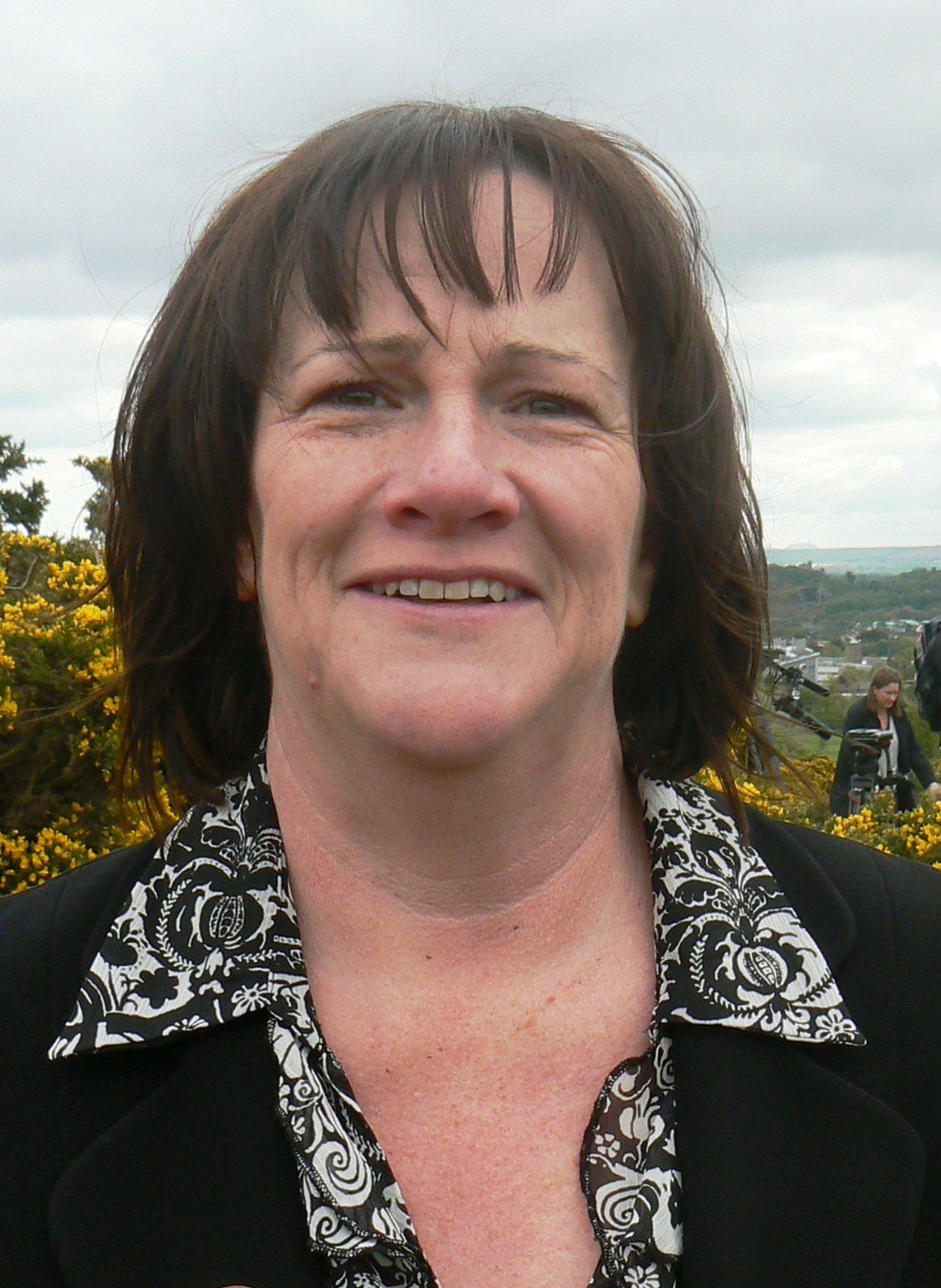
- O'Donnell in 2010

Member of East Lothian Council for Preston, Seton and Gosford
- In office 4 May 2017 – 6 May 2022

Shadow Minister for the Natural Environment and Fisheries
- In office 7 October 2011 – 30 June 2012
- Leader: Ed Miliband
- Preceded by: Jamie Reed
- Succeeded by: Tom Harris

Member of Parliament for East Lothian
- In office 6 May 2010 – 30 March 2015
- Preceded by: Anne Moffat
- Succeeded by: George Kerevan

Personal details
- Born: Fiona Kenny; 27 January 1960 (age 66) Nanaimo, British Columbia, Canada
- Party: Scottish Labour
- Education: Lochaber High School
- Alma mater: University of Glasgow

Fiona O'Donnell (née Kenny; born 27 January 1960) is a Scottish Labour Party politician who served as the Member of Parliament (MP) for East Lothian from 2010 to 2015.

She served as the Shadow Minister for the Natural Environment and Fisheries from 2011 to 2012, and was elected as a Member of East Lothian Council in 2017.

== Early life ==
Born in Nanaimo, British Columbia, but raised in Fort William, Scotland since the age of five, O'Donnell was educated at Lochaber High School and the University of Glasgow.

== Political career ==
At the 2010 general election, O'Donnell succeeded Anne Moffat, who was deselected by the constituency party in January, as the MP for East Lothian with a majority of over 12,000.

She briefly served on Ed Miliband's front bench as the Shadow Minister for the Natural Environment and Fisheries from October 2011 to June 2012.

O'Donnell sat on various parliamentary select committees, including the International Development Committee, the Standards and Privileges Committee, the Committees on Arms Export Controls and the Scottish Affairs Select Committee.

In the final week of the 2010-15 Parliament, she introduced a proposed Bill on improving tax transparency under the Ten Minute Rule.

O'Donnell lost her seat at the 2015 general election with a swing of over 20% to the Scottish National Party candidate George Kerevan.

She contested the seat of Galloway and West Dumfries at the 2016 Scottish Parliament election, but finished in third-place behind the Scottish Conservative and Scottish National Party candidates.

O'Donnell was selected as a Labour candidate for Preston, Seton and Gosford on East Lothian Council in November 2016, and won the seat at the May 2017 local elections.

Parliament of the United Kingdom
Preceded by Anne Moffat	Member of Parliament for East Lothian; 2010 – 2015	Succeeded by George Kerevan
