= Joseph Harper (Labour politician) =

British politician (1914–1978)

Joseph Harper MP

Member of Parliament for Pontefract and Castleford Pontefract (1962–1974)
- In office 22 March 1962 – 24 June 1978
- Preceded by: George Sylvester
- Succeeded by: Geoffrey Lofthouse

Personal details
- Born: 17 March 1914
- Died: 24 June 1978 (aged 64)
- Party: Labour
- Spouse: Gwen
- Children: 4

Joseph Harper (17 March 1914 – 24 June 1978) was a Labour Party politician in Great Britain.

He was elected as the Member of Parliament MP for Pontefract at a by-election in 1962. He was MP for the constituency and then the reformed Pontefract and Castleford constituency until he died in office at the age of 64. Playwright James Graham has attributed Harper's death to his decision to "[delay] emergency surgery in his determination to never miss a vote".

At the by-election held following Harper's death, the seat was held for Labour by Geoffrey Lofthouse.

Harper was from a working-class background working at Ackton Hall Colliery, Featherstone. He lived at 11 Bedford Close, Featherstone with his wife Gwen and youngest daughter Pat. He had a further daughter, Wendy, who also resided on Bedford Close, and two sons Glyn and Graham.

Parliament of the United Kingdom
Preceded by George Sylvester	Member of Parliament for Pontefract; 1962–Feb 1974	Constituency abolished
New constituency	Member of Parliament for Pontefract and Castleford; Feb 1974–1978	Succeeded by Geoffrey Lofthouse
Political offices
Preceded by Walter Clegg	Comptroller of the Household; 1974–1978	Succeeded by James Hamilton
