= John Home Robertson =

British politician (born 1948)

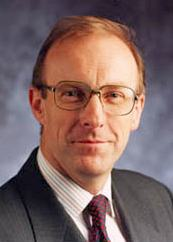
- Robertson as MSP

Member of the Scottish Parliament for East Lothian
- In office 6 May 1999 – 2 April 2007
- Preceded by: Office established
- Succeeded by: Iain Gray

Member of Parliament for East Lothian Berwick and East Lothian (1978–1983)
- In office 26 October 1978 – 14 May 2001
- Preceded by: John Mackintosh
- Succeeded by: Anne Picking

Personal details
- Born: John David Home Robertson; 5 December 1948 (age 77) Edinburgh, Scotland
- Party: Labour
- Spouse: Catherine Brewster (m. 1977)

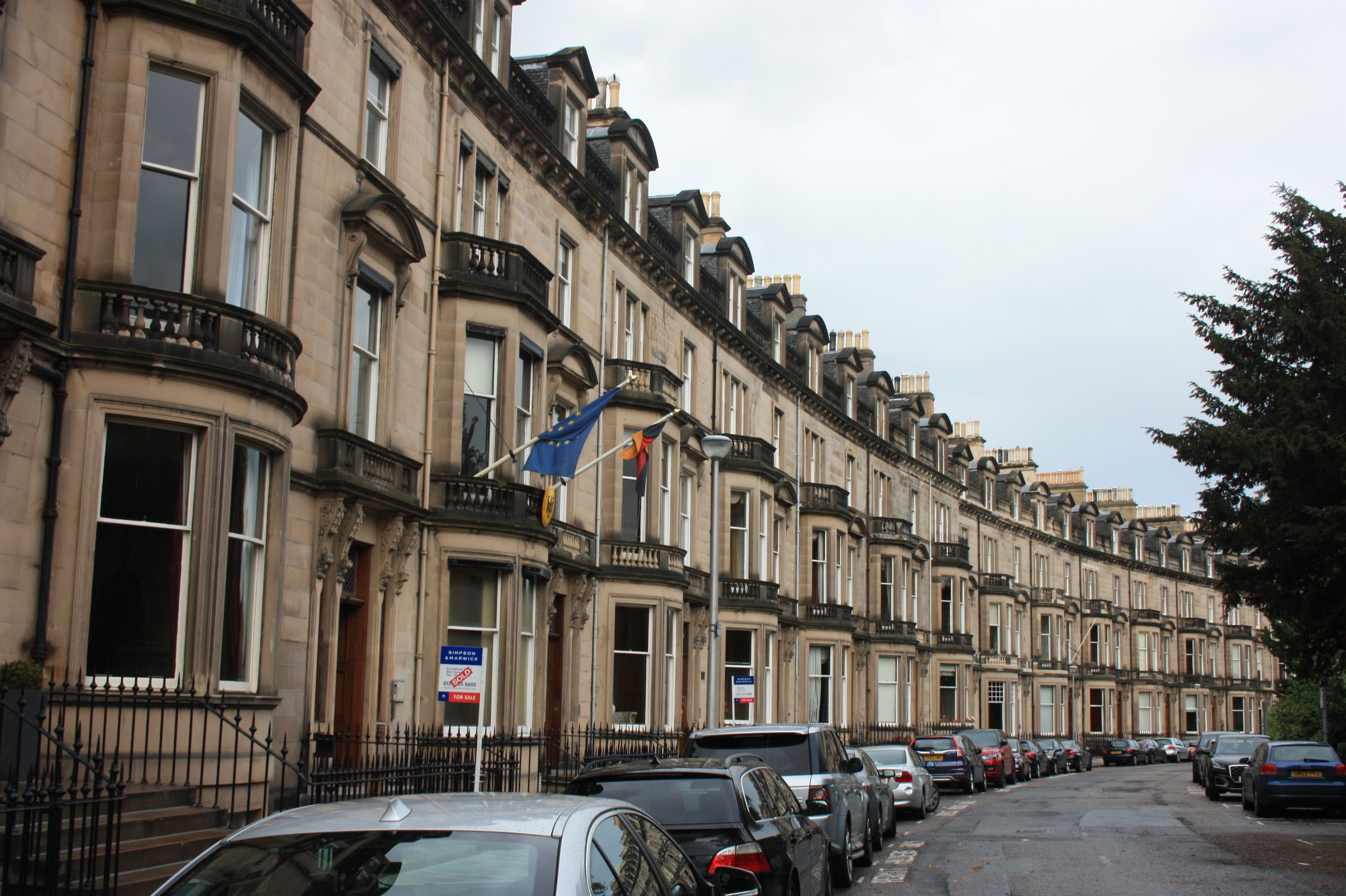
Eglinton Crescent, Edinburgh

John David Home Robertson (born 5 December 1948) is a retired Labour politician in Scotland. He was a Member of Parliament (MP) for Berwick and East Lothian and East Lothian from 1978 to 2001 and a Member of the Scottish Parliament (MSP) for East Lothian from 1999 until 2007.

== Background ==
John David Home Robertson was born at 18 Eglinton Crescent, Edinburgh, the son of John Wallace Robertson, Lieutenant-Colonel of the King's Own Scottish Borderers regiment, who assumed the additional surname in 1933, by Scottish Licence, of Home following his marriage that year to Helen Margaret (1905–1987), elder daughter and heiress of David William Milne-Home (1873–1918), of Wedderburn & Paxton, Berwickshire.

He was educated at Farleigh School, Ampleforth College and at the West of Scotland Agricultural College. In 1988, Home Robertson placed his maternal family's historic home and grounds, Paxton House, in a Historic Buildings Preservation Trust, and opened it to the public. It is a Partner Gallery of the National Galleries of Scotland.

== Political career ==
Home Robertson was an Independent member of Berwickshire District Council from 1974 to 1978, representing Burnmouth, Foulden and Hutton ward. Following the 1977 local government elections, he was the only non-Conservative member still remaining on the Council. He also sat on the Borders NHS Health Board from 1976 to 1978, and was Chairman of the Eastern Borders Citizens Advice Bureau in 1977.

Although elected as a non-partisan councillor, Home Robertson was at the time a Labour Party activist, and as a delegate to the Party's Annual Conference in 1976 he moved the resolution which committed it to supporting devolution for Scotland. Throughout his career at Westminster he continued to campaign for the establishment of the Scottish Parliament, conscious of the fact that one of his forebears was a Member of the (original) Parliament of Scotland, for Berwickshire, who in 1707 had opposed the Act of Union.

Home Robertson was the successful Labour candidate at the Berwick and East Lothian by-election in 1978, following the death of Labour MP John Mackintosh. He represented Berwick and East Lothian until the 1983 general election, when the constituency was abolished and he was elected for the new constituency of East Lothian. He was re-elected at subsequent general elections before standing down in 2001, when he was replaced by Anne Picking.

At Westminster, Home Robertson served on the Scottish Affairs (1979–83) and Defence (1990–97) select committees, and was Chairman of the Scottish Group of Labour MPs from 1982 to 1983. He spent time as Opposition Scottish Whip (1983–84), and as Labour's Opposition Front Bench Spokesman on Agriculture (1984–87), Scottish Affairs (1987–88), and Agricultural and Rural Affairs (1988–90). A Europhile, he was one of only five Labour MPs to vote for the Third Reading of the Maastricht Treaty in 1993, defying his party Whip, which was to abstain.

Following Labour's victory at the 1997 general election, he was Parliamentary Private Secretary to Jack Cunningham at the Ministry of Agriculture and then at the Cabinet Office, where he remained until he was elected as the Member of the Scottish Parliament (MSP) for East Lothian at the first Scottish parliamentary election in 1999. Having left Westminster in 2001, he announced that he would stand down from the Scottish Parliament in 2007, and was succeeded as MSP for East Lothian by Iain Gray.

Parliament of the United Kingdom
Preceded by John Mackintosh	Member of Parliament for Berwick and East Lothian; 1978–1983	Constituency abolished
New constituency	Member of Parliament for East Lothian; 1983–2001	Succeeded by Anne Picking
Scottish Parliament
New constituency	Member of the Scottish Parliament for East Lothian; 1999–2007	Succeeded by Iain Gray
