= Martin Whitfield =

Scottish Labour politician

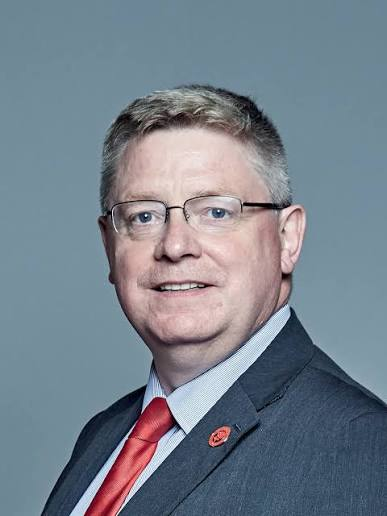
- Official portrait, 2021

Convener of the Standards and Procedures and Public Appointments Committee
- In office 22 June 2021 – 8 April 2026
- Deputy: Bob Doris
- Preceded by: Bill Kidd
- Succeeded by: Jenni Minto

Member of the Scottish Parliament for South Scotland (1 of 7 Regional MSPs)
- In office 6 May 2021 – 9 April 2026

Member of Parliament for East Lothian
- In office 8 June 2017 – 6 November 2019
- Preceded by: George Kerevan
- Succeeded by: Kenny MacAskill

Personal details
- Born: 12 August 1965 (age 61) Gosforth, Newcastle-Upon-Tyne, England
- Party: Labour
- Other political affiliations: Labour Friends of Israel
- Spouse: Rachel Whitfield
- Children: 2
- Education: Huddersfield Polytechnic

Martin David Whitfield (born 12 August 1965) is a Scottish Labour politician and former lawyer and primary school teacher who was a Member of the Scottish Parliament (MSP) for the South Scotland region and the Convener of the Standards and Procedures and Public Appointments Committee from 2021 to 2026.

Whitfield previously served as the Member of Parliament for East Lothian from the 2017 snap general election, when he unseated the sitting MP, George Kerevan of the Scottish National Party, until his defeat at the 2019 general election by the SNP candidate Kenny MacAskill, who later defected to Alba in 2021.

== Early life, education and career ==
Whitfield was born in Gosforth in Newcastle and achieved a BA (Hons) in Business Law from Huddersfield Polytechnic. He worked as a solicitor between 1989 and 2001, before leaving the law profession to retrain as a teacher at the University of Edinburgh, achieving a PGCPE pass with merit in teaching in 2002.

Prior to his election, Whitfield worked at Prestonpans Primary School and served as a council member of the General Teaching Council for Scotland as well as a member of the EIS, Scotland's largest trade union. He was also Chair of Prestonpans Community Council and involved in a number of community groups.

== Political career ==
=== UK Parliament ===
Whitfield was named as the official Labour Party candidate for the East Lothian constituency at the 2017 UK general election, where he unseated the sitting Scottish National Party MP, George Kerevan.

Whitfield was an active opponent of Brexit and a strong supporter of a second referendum, referred to as a "People's Vote". He supported the official recognition of non-binary people in official government documentation. He was one of 216 general election candidates to pledge support for the Israel Election Pledge.

In June 2018, Whitfield led an adjournment debate on the challenges faced by people with 'hidden' disabilities, particularly in relation to the use of accessible toilets and cited the Grace's Sign campaign run by a young constituent, Grace Warnock. In June 2019, he led a further backbench debate on invisible disabilities and accessibility challenges, including the new Any Disability Sign. Whitfield was a strong critic of the rollout of Universal Credit and was one of the first Labour MPs to call for the new benefit to be replaced entirely. In October 2018, he attracted widespread praise after leading a Commons debate on World Menopause Day.

Following the announcement that the US would impose tariffs on single malt Scotch whisky from 18 October 2019, Whitfield took a leading role in efforts to encourage the UK Government to persuade US counterparts to reconsider the move and co-ordinated a letter to the US Ambassador. Whitfield was a member of several All-Party Parliamentary Groups, including the Timber Industries APPG, which he chaired. He was also a member of the Commons' Science and Technology Select Committee.

Whitfield was the Co-Chair of Anas Sarwar's unsuccessful 2017 Scottish Labour leadership campaign. He supported MP Ian Murray's UK Labour deputy leadership campaign, MSP Jackie Baillie's Scottish Labour deputy leadership campaign, and Anas Sarwar's successful 2021 Scottish Labour leadership campaign.

He lost his seat at the 2019 general election to the SNP candidate, Kenny MacAskill. He later became a supporter and executive committee member for the organisation Scientists for Labour, providing advice and input to Sir Keir Starmer's office on the COVID-19 pandemic.

=== Scottish Parliament ===
Whitfield stood for election to the Scottish Parliament in the East Lothian constituency and the South Scotland regional list at the 2021 Scottish Parliament election.

At the election, Whitfield finished in a close second place behind the SNP, with 16,789 votes and a share of 36.6%, but was elected on the South Scotland list vote.

Whitfield was Labour's Parliamentary Business Manager and spokesperson for Children and Young People in the Scottish Parliament.

Whitfield backed the UK Government’s decision to introduce means-testing for the Winter Fuel Payment, voting in the Scottish Parliament against calls to reverse the decision.

Whitfield stood for re-election to the Scottish Parliament at the 2026 Scottish Parliament election, contesting the East Lothian Coast and Lammermuirs constituency and appearing on the Edinburgh and Lothians East regional list. He faced Paul McLennan, the SNP candidate who had previously defeated him in 2021. Whitfield was ultimately unsuccessful, narrowly losing the constituency seat to McLennan for a second time and failing to secure election via the regional list.

== Personal life ==
Whitfield lives in Prestonpans, East Lothian with his family, he is married to Rachel; with two children.

Parliament of the United Kingdom
Preceded by George Kerevan	Member of Parliament for East Lothian; 2017–2019	Succeeded by Kenny MacAskill
