= Anne Moffat =

Scottish politician

Member of Parliament for East Lothian
- In office 7 June 2001 – 12 April 2010
- Preceded by: John Home Robertson
- Succeeded by: Fiona O'Donnell

Personal details
- Born: 30 March 1958 (age 68) Dunfermline, Fife, Scotland
- Party: Labour
- Spouse(s): David Picking (c. 2003) Lawrence McCran (m. 2009)
- Children: 1

Anne Moffat (born 30 March 1958) is a Scottish Labour Party politician who was the Member of Parliament (MP) for East Lothian from 2001 to 2010. She was deselected by her Constituency Labour Party and replaced by Fiona O'Donnell.

== Early life ==
Born in Dunfermline, Scotland, in 1958, she is of the Moffat family of East Lothian and Fife, but was known by her married name, Anne Picking. She contested the 2005 election under her married name, despite having been divorced for two years, so as not to confuse the voters. Following the election she returned to her maiden name. She attended Woodmill High School in Dunfermline before embarking on a career in nursing.

She joined the Fife Health Board in 1975 as a nursing assistant, becoming a pupil nurse in 1977, before becoming a State Enrolled Nurse in 1978 working at the Lynebank Hospital in Dunfermline. In 1978 she left Fife and joined the Northern Ireland Eastern Health Service in 1980, leaving in 1983 as a staff nurse.

She moved to England in 1983 and joined the East Kent Community Health Care Trust as a staff nurse. She became a councillor in 1994 on the Ashford Borough Council where she served until 2000. She has been a member of the National Executive Committee since 1990. Moffat is also a member of UNISON and the Trades Union Congress's General Purposes Committee.

== Parliamentary career ==
Moffat was elected to the House of Commons for the East Lothian constituency in the 2001 general election.

She served on a number of select committees including the Modernisation and Accommodation and Works Committee (2004–2005), the European Scrutiny Committee (2004–2005) and Trade and Industry Select Committee (2005–2007). She was also Parliamentary Private Secretary to Alan Johnson at the Department of Health from 2008 to 2009.

In November 2008, Moffat was one of 18 MPs who signed a Commons motion backing a Team GB football team at the 2012 Summer Olympics, saying that football "should not be any different from other competing sports and our young talent should be allowed to show their skills on the world stage". The football governing bodies of Scotland, Wales and Northern Ireland are all opposed to a Great Britain team, fearing it would stop them competing as individual nations in future tournaments.

=== Travel expenses ===
In 2003–2004, Moffat billed the taxpayer £39,744 for travel expenses – the highest of any Member of Parliament.

Green Party activist Michael Collie fought to have the details of the claims published under the Freedom of Information Act. The UK Parliament refused to disclose the information for a total of two years, going as far as the High Court to prevent its disclosure. It was not until November 2007 that Moffat's expenses were finally made public.

Moffat claimed for first-class rail and air fares and trips to Malta and Portugal. Moffat claimed £9,792 in rail fares, with the average claim for a London to Glasgow/Edinburgh journey being £277. She had also claimed £1,817 in rail fares for 42 trips between Heathrow and Central London – an average of £43 when the highest priced ticket costs £18. Moffat claimed £15,712 for air travel between London and Scotland, plus £12,289 in mileage (a total of 24,129 miles). In total for the period 2002–2005 Moffat's travel expenses amounted to £95,539. She cut her claims by 70% in 2006–07, claiming £12,331. In 2007/2008 she had the joint highest expenses claims for Additional Costs Allowances including claims for £400 per month for food even when Parliament is not sitting.

=== Hitler comparison of First Minister ===
On 23 May 2007, she compared the newly elected Scottish First Minister Alex Salmond to Adolf Hitler, saying that "proportional representation gave Germany Adolf Hitler and in Scotland to a lesser degree we've had the member for Banff and Buchan" during a debate in the House of Commons on the 2007 Scottish Parliament election. Angus Robertson criticised Moffat's conduct, saying: "It was ignorant, it was ill-judged, it was plain wrong, and it was very dangerous." Moffat said, "What I was referring to was the voting system, the proportional representation and electoral voting system, not about individuals. I was just giving examples."

=== Deselection by constituency party ===
In November 2008 the East Lothian constituency party passed a vote of no confidence in Moffat. Her critics claimed dissatisfaction over Moffat's travel expenses and disputes with constituency staff. In response, the national Labour Party suspended the constituency party.

However, the East Lothian Labour Party proceeded to vote on 22 January 2010 to deselect Anne Moffat. This was confirmed by a further vote by 130 to 59 on 19 March 2010.

Her critics, who included senior party officials in the constituency, asserted that she had neglected her duties as an MP, as exemplified by having been, at one point, the MP to make the lowest number of speeches in the House of Commons; that she had failed to attend party meetings; and that she had failed to properly represent her constituents.

On 23 March the National Executive Committee of the Labour Party rejected her appeal. On 25 March it emerged that she had negotiated a retirement deal as an MP on the grounds of poor health.

== Personal life ==
Moffat is married to her second husband Lawrence McCran. She has one son.

In May 2008, Moffat was attacked and robbed near her home by a gang of youths. She was knocked unconscious and had her watch and jewellery stolen.

On 25 May 2009, The Independent reported that Moffat had visited hospital with what was described as "traces of blood on the pituitary gland".

== See also ==
- Candidate deselection (Labour Party)

Parliament of the United Kingdom
Preceded by John Home Robertson	Member of Parliament for East Lothian; 2001–2010	Succeeded by Fiona O'Donnell
Trade union offices
Preceded by Alison Shepherd	President of Unison; 1999–2000	Succeeded by Adrian Dilworth
