= John Robertson (Berwick MP) =

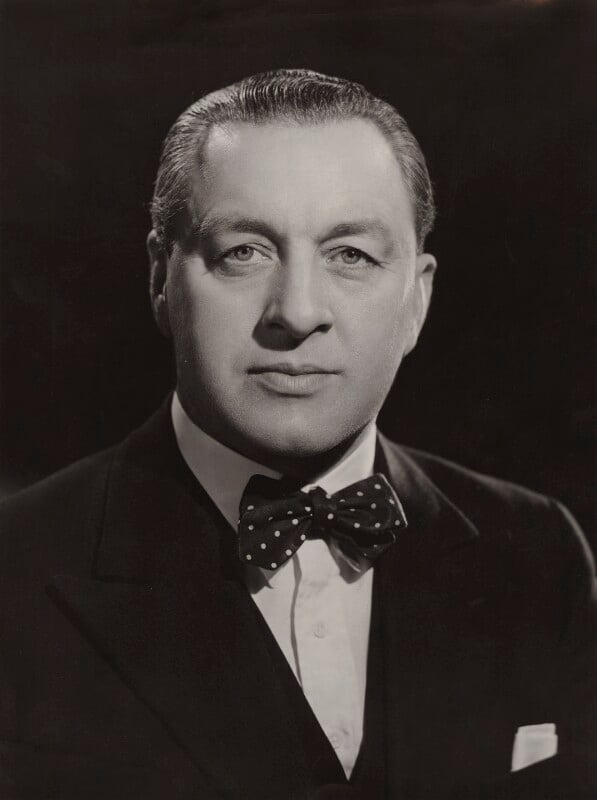
Robertson in 1947

John James Robertson (23 May 1898 – 6 October 1955) was a Scottish Labour Party politician who served as a member of parliament from 1945 to 1951.

Born in Shetland, Robertson was first elected at the 1945 general election, a landslide victory for the Labour Party nationwide; as the Member of Parliament for Berwick and Haddington. Following boundary changes, he was returned to the House of Commons at the 1950 general election for the new constituency of Berwick and East Lothian. The following year, Robertson lost his seat at the 1951 general election to the Unionist candidate, William Anstruther-Gray. The Labour Party lost the general election to the Conservatives that year, after six years in government.

Parliament of the United Kingdom
Preceded by John McEwen	Member of Parliament for Berwick and Haddington; 1945–1950	Constituency abolished
New constituency	Member of Parliament for Berwick and East Lothian; 1950–1951	Succeeded by William Anstruther-Gray
