= Pontefract and Castleford =

UK Parliament constituency (1974–2010)

Coordinates: 53.708°N 1.316°W

- Former county constituency for the House of Commons
- Boundary of Pontefract and Castleford in West Yorkshire for the 2005 general election

- Location of West Yorkshire within England
- County: West Yorkshire

1974–2010
- Seats: One
- Created from: Pontefract
- Replaced by: Normanton, Pontefract & Castleford

Pontefract and Castleford was a constituency represented in the House of Commons of the Parliament of the United Kingdom until the 2010 general election. It elected one Member of Parliament (MP) by the first past the post system of election.

== Boundaries ==
1974–1983: The Municipal Boroughs of Castleford and Pontefract, and the Urban District of Featherstone.

1983–2010: The City of Wakefield wards of Castleford Ferry Fryston, Castleford Glasshoughton, Castleford Whitwood, Knottingley, Pontefract North, and Pontefract South.

The constituency covered the West Yorkshire towns of Pontefract and Castleford. It was a very safe Labour seat, made up of former mining towns and villages. The MP from 1997 until its abolition in 2010, Home Secretary Yvette Cooper, is married to former fellow Labour MP, former Shadow Chancellor Ed Balls.

=== Boundary review ===
Following their review of parliamentary representation in West Yorkshire, the number of seats in West Yorkshire were reduced by one due to population decline by the Boundary Commission for England. A new, geographically larger, constituency called Normanton, Pontefract and Castleford was created in 2010 including the whole of this constituency.

== Members of Parliament ==
Election	Member	Party
Feb 1974	Joe Harper	Labour
1978 by-election	Sir Geoffrey Lofthouse	Labour
1997	Yvette Cooper	Labour
2010	Constituency abolished: see Normanton, Pontefract and Castleford	

== Elections ==
=== Elections in the 2000s ===
General election 2005: Pontefract and Castleford
Party	Candidate	Votes	%	±%
Labour	Yvette Cooper	20,973	63.7	−6.0
Conservative	Simon Jones	5,727	17.4	−0.2
Liberal Democrats	Wesley Paxton	3,942	12.0	+4.6
BNP	Suzy Cass	1,835	5.6	New
Alliance for Green Socialism	Bob Hague	470	1.4	New
Majority		15,246	46.3	−5.8
Turnout		32,947	53.3	+3.6
Labour hold		Swing		

General election 2001: Pontefract and Castleford
Party	Candidate	Votes	%	±%
Labour	Yvette Cooper	21,890	69.7	−6.0
Conservative	Pamela Singleton	5,512	17.6	+4.0
Liberal Democrats	Wesley Paxton	2,315	7.4	0.0
UKIP	John Burdon	739	2.4	New
Socialist Labour	Trevor Bolderson	605	1.9	New
Socialist Alliance	John Gill	330	1.1	New
Majority		16,378	52.1	−10.0
Turnout		31,391	49.7	−16.6
Labour hold		Swing		

=== Elections in the 1990s ===
General election 1997: Pontefract and Castleford
Party	Candidate	Votes	%	±%
Labour	Yvette Cooper	31,339	75.7	+5.8
Conservative	Adrian Flook	5,614	13.6	−7.3
Liberal Democrats	Wesley Paxton	3,042	7.4	−1.8
Referendum	Richard Wood	1,401	3.4	New
Majority		25,725	62.1	+13.1
Turnout		41,396	66.3	−8.0
Labour hold		Swing		

General election 1992: Pontefract and Castleford
Party	Candidate	Votes	%	±%
Labour	Geoffrey Lofthouse	33,546	69.9	+3.0
Conservative	Anthony George Mortimer Rockall	10,051	20.9	−0.3
Liberal Democrats	David Lawrence Ryan	4,410	9.2	−2.1
Majority		23,495	49.0	+3.3
Turnout		48,007	74.3	+0.8
Labour hold		Swing	+1.6	

=== Elections in the 1980s ===
General election 1987: Pontefract and Castleford
Party	Candidate	Votes	%	±%
Labour	Geoffrey Lofthouse	31,656	66.9	+9.8
Conservative	Julian Malins	10,051	21.2	−4.6
Alliance	Michael Taylor	5,334	11.3	−5.8
Red Front	Daniel McFarlane-Lees	295	0.6	New
Majority		21,626	45.7	+14.4
Turnout		47,315	73.5	+7.1
Labour hold		Swing		

General election 1983: Pontefract and Castleford
Party	Candidate	Votes	%	±%
Labour	Geoffrey Lofthouse	24,990	57.1	
Conservative	Barry Howell	11,299	25.8	
Alliance	Douglas Dale	7,452	17.1	
Majority		13,691	31.3	
Turnout		43,741	67.4	
Labour hold		Swing		

=== Elections in the 1970s ===
General election 1979: Pontefract and Castleford
Party	Candidate	Votes	%	±%
Labour	Geoffrey Lofthouse	30,566	68.1	−2.3
Conservative	Hugo Page	10,665	23.8	+7.6
Liberal	Leslie Marsh	3,616	8.0	−4.3
Majority		19,901	44.3	−9.9
Turnout		44,837	73.9	+2.8
Labour hold		Swing		

1978 Pontefract and Castleford by-election
Party	Candidate	Votes	%	±%
Labour	Geoffrey Lofthouse	19,508	65.8	−4.6
Conservative	Hugo Page	8,080	27.3	+11.1
Liberal	Leslie Marsh	2,054	6.9	−5.4
Majority		11,428	38.5	−15.7
Turnout		29,642		
Labour hold		Swing	−7.9	

General election October 1974: Pontefract and Castleford
Party	Candidate	Votes	%	±%
Labour	Joseph Harper	30,208	70.4	−4.4
Conservative	I. Bloomer	6,966	16.2	−6.9
Liberal	S. Galloway	5,259	12.3	New
Workers Revolutionary	T. Parsons	457	1.1	−1.1
Majority		23,242	54.2	+2.4
Turnout		42,890	71.1	−6.0
Labour hold		Swing		

General election February 1974: Pontefract and Castleford
Party	Candidate	Votes	%	±%
Labour	Joseph Harper	34,409	74.8	
Conservative	Richard Needham	10,605	23.1	
Workers Revolutionary	B. Lavery	991	2.2	
Majority		23,804	51.8	
Turnout		46,005	77.1	
Labour win (new seat)				

== See also ==
- List of parliamentary constituencies in West Yorkshire
