= Geoffrey Lofthouse =

British Labour politician, MP and life peer

The Right Honourable The Lord Lofthouse of Pontefract JP
- Lofthouse speaking in the House of Lords, 2008

Deputy Speaker of the House of Commons First Deputy Chairman of Ways and Means
- In office 27 April 1992 – 14 May 1997
- Speaker: Betty Boothroyd
- Preceded by: Sir Paul Dean
- Succeeded by: Michael Martin

Member of Parliament for Pontefract and Castleford
- In office 26 October 1978 – 8 April 1997
- Preceded by: Joseph Harper
- Succeeded by: Yvette Cooper

Member of the House of Lords
- Lord Temporal
- Life peerage 11 June 1997 – 1 November 2012

Personal details
- Born: 18 December 1925 Featherstone, West Riding of Yorkshire, England
- Died: 1 November 2012 (aged 86)
- Party: Labour
- Spouse: Sarah Lofthouse (m. 1946; died 1985)

Geoffrey Lofthouse, Baron Lofthouse of Pontefract, JP (18 December 1925 – 1 November 2012), popularly known in his former constituency as Geoff Lofthouse, was a British Labour politician, MP and life peer.

== Early life ==
He was born in Featherstone, West Riding of Yorkshire, the son of Ernest Lofthouse, a farm labourer in Micklefield, and Emma (née Fellows). His father died at the age of 35. At the age of 14, Geoff Lofthouse went to work at Ackton Hall Colliery in Featherstone. At age 29, he was the president of the local branch of the NUM. He went to the University of Leeds, gaining a BA in Political Studies in 1957, when he was 32 years old. In 1962, he became a councillor on Pontefract Borough Council. He was mayor of Pontefract in 1967, and leader of the council from 1969 to 1973.

== Parliamentary career ==
He was MP for Pontefract and Castleford from a 1978 by-election until his retirement at the 1997 general election. In the House of Commons, he served from 1992 until his retirement as a Deputy Speaker of the House to Betty Boothroyd. In the Queen's Birthday Honours 1995 Lofthouse was appointed a Knight Bachelor. In the Queen's Birthday Honours 1997 Lofthouse was made a life peer as Baron Lofthouse of Pontefract, of Pontefract, in the county of West Yorkshire.

== Publications ==
His autobiography, A Very Miner MP, is available from Yorkshire Art Circus Publishers. He also wrote a further autobiography, From Coal Sack to Woolsack.

== Personal life ==
He married when he was 20 years old; he and his wife Sarah had a daughter.

== Death ==
Lofthouse died on 1 November 2012, aged 86. His funeral service was held at St Giles' Church, Pontefract.

== Arms ==
Coat of arms of Geoffrey Lofthouse
Crest A canary Or holding in the dexter foot a miner's lamp Sable glazed Proper. Escutcheon Azure on a pale between and conjoined to two grilles throughout Or the whole surmounted by three chevronels Argent over all on a pale Sable three ellipses palewise. Supporters On either side a mole sejant erect holding in the mouth a rose Argent barbed and seeded slipped and leaved Or. Motto Stick And Lift

Parliament of the United Kingdom
Preceded by Joseph Harper	Member of Parliament for Pontefract and Castleford; 1978–1997	Succeeded by Yvette Cooper
