= E-petitioner =

E-petitioner is an online petition system developed in Scotland, characterised by its integration into the processes of representative democracy. It allows citizens to raise and sign a petition, read background information on the issue, and add comments to an online forum associated with each petition.

The system evolved from a research project conducted jointly by the Scottish Parliament, the International Teledemocracy Centre at Edinburgh Napier University and BT Scotland, as part of an investigation into the use of information and communication technologies in encouraging democratic participation.

It has been used by national governments, local authorities and a students union.

== The system ==
There are three groups of actors in the e-petition:

1. people who want to raise petitions (petitioners);
2. people who support particular petition issues (signatories);
3. the body to which the petitions are addressed: e.g. parliament, government, local council. In the e-petitioner system, this body has overall responsibility for the system, including its administration.

=== Petition information ===
The principal petitioner provides background information, along with the petition text, which is published on the website.

After the petition is submitted, visitors may track the petitions progress through the parliament or local council, for example via a “progress in parliament” button.

=== Signing the petition ===
Signatories’ names are displayed for transparency, but addresses are stored privately, ensuring that the system complies with data protection laws.

The system automatically deletes duplicate signatures and provides administrators with graphical indicators of confidence in the validity of signatures, based upon automated checks. These compare IP addresses, e-mail addresses and check the name against a list. These indicators support the administrator's scrutiny of input. Administrators may also remove signatures which are offensive.

Once the petition has run for its period, the system automatically generates figures of the numbers of signatures made (valid and invalid) as well as the regions from which these signatures came.

=== The forum ===
The discussion forum allows the petitioner to prompt the public into debate upon the issue. The forum serves as a place where those who disagree may register their opinion and reasoning. It also enables people to record their own experiences of the issue, providing anecdotal evidence to supplement abstract argument. During the petition's lifetime, the administrators moderate the discussion, in addition to the spam filters provided.

=== Other tools for administrators ===
The back end of the system facilitates the administration of e-petitions; their creation, their day-to-day maintenance and their closure. Administration tools are tailored to integrate with the parliament or authority's preferred means of processing petitions.

=== Technical specifications ===
E-petitioner is implemented in Microsoft Active Server Pages (ASP) and uses a SQL server database to hold the petitions data. It uses the open standard XHTML 1.0 for web page markup, and ODBC (open database connectivity standard) to connect to the database. The system is currently hosted on a Windows 2003 server running IIS and SQL Server 2005. Disk storage requirements for the application are less than 10 MB.

== Evolution of the system ==
=== Background and inception ===
The creation of a devolved Parliament for Scotland in 1999 presented the opportunity to establish a process of government that incorporated the prevailing views on best practice. An influential document in this respect was the report of the 'Consultative Steering Group’ produced by the Scottish Office in 1998. The report was substantially influenced by the earlier work commissioned from Bernard Crick and David Millar. One of their proposals, retained in the report, was that the parliament should employ all forms of information and communication technology "innovatively and appropriately" to support openness, accessibility and participation.

The steering group recognised the importance of enabling groups and individuals to influence the Parliament's agenda, and recommended that a process to handle petitions should be encouraged, where that process had clear and simple rules on form and content, and specified clearly how the petitions would be handled. To fulfil these proposals, The Scottish Parliament established a Public Petitions Committee (PPC), for the promotion and management of petitions.

In December 1999, the PPC entered into partnership with ITC and BT Scotland to design of the e-petitioner system, geared towards meeting the standards of openness, accessibility and participation aspired to in contemporary democracy.

The World Wide Fund for Nature (WWF) were conducting a campaign to provide National Park status for selected coastal regions of Scotland and accepted the opportunity to raise the first e-petition run by the PPC, which they called 'Our Seas Deserve a vote'. The pilot system developed out of this conjunction: The Parliament defining their user requirements and WWF specifying what features would be attractive to civic groups (NGOs) wanting an accessible and transparent lobbying tool. ITC designed the tool and it was implemented by BT Scotland as a dynamic website. The e-petition ran until 29 February 2000, collecting 305 valid signatures and 9 valid comments.

The Scottish Parliament continued to accept petitions from the system and then asked ITC to re-engineer e-petitioner to more fully integrate it with the Parliament's website, specifically with the Public Petition Committee's pages and database of received petitions. From that period, ITC and the Parliament have continued to collaborate in developing the system.

=== Further implementations ===
In June 2004, the e-petitioner system was chosen as part of the UK Government's Local e-Democracy National Project, funded by the ODPM (Office of the Deputy Prime Minister). The aim was to explore how English local authorities could use e-petitioning to allow citizens to raise concerns within the formal policy-making processes of the local council. Both the Royal Borough of Kingston upon Thames and Bristol City Council piloted versions of the system in the year to March 2005. The system was adapted, by ITC, in partnership with the 2 councils, to align it with their contexts and processes. After the pilot period, Kingston took control of their e-petitioner system and its future development; Bristol continued to use the pilot system, with minor adaptations until 2008.

In 2005, a version of e-petitioner was produced for the German Parliament (Bundestag). This was a collaborative project involving The Scottish Parliament, ITC and the Bundestag 'Online Services Department'. The Bundestag has specific responsibilities in relation to citizens right to petition parliament. The system was formally launched on 1 September 2005, and in 2008 the Bundestag moved to a new system based on its evaluation of the use of the ITC system.

In 2006, the e@SY Connects partnership in South Yorkshire worked with ITC to implement e-Petitioner as a part of the 'Hanse Passage Participation' initiative The e@SY Connects partnership's aim is to provide the local population with information and services via interactive television, mobile phone, information kiosks and the Internet.

The King's College London Students' Union also uses the e-petitioner system.

=== 10 years on ===
In June 2009 The Scottish Parliament published its report into petitioning in the Scottish Parliament. This included an evaluation of the e-Petitioner system.

=== Related systems ===
In 2007–08 Public-i worked with the ITC to develop the ideas as an open-source petitioning component of their 'eParticipate' suite of applications which has now been implemented by Bristol Council.

This system is being further developed as part of the EuroPetition project.

== See also ==
- eParticipation
- Internet petition
- UK Parliament petitions website
- We the People (petitioning system)

== Selected related articles ==
- ePetitioning: A viewpoint from Bristol City Council (16 June 2009)
- ICELE (2007) Special Supplement. (16 June 2009)
- ICELE (2008) ePetitions – the benefits(16 June 2009)
- 'E-petition calls for safer road' (BBC) and '"Safer road" follows e-petition' (BBC) (16 June 2009)
- Adams, N. J., Macintosh, A., and Johnston, J. (2005); 'e-Petitioning: Enabling Ground-up Participation'; Challenges of Expanding Internet: E-Commerce, E-Business and E-Government; Matohisa Funabashi and Adam Grzech (eds); 5th IFIP Conference on e-Commerce, E-Business and E-Government (I3E'2005); 26–28 October 2005, Poznan, Poland, pp 265–279.
- Macintosh, A., Malina, A., and Farrell, S. (2002); 'Digital Democracy through Electronic Petitioning'; In McIver, W. and Elmagarmid, A.K. (eds). Advances in Digital Government: Technology, Human Factors, and Policy; Boston/Dordrecht/London: Kluwer Academic Publishers. pp. 137–148 (16 June 2009)
- Beddie, L. Macintosh, L. and Malina, A. (2001); 'E-democracy and the Scottish Parliament.' In Schmid, B. Stanoevska-Slabeva, Tschammer, V.. (eds). Towards the e-society: E-commerce, e-business, and e-government; Boston/Dordrecht/London: IFIP, Kluwer Academic Publishers

=== Evaluations: the Scottish Parliament system ===
- Malina, A. Macintosh, A. and Davenport, E. (2001); E-petitioner: A Monitoring and Evaluation Report Funded by The Joseph Rowntree Charitable Trust. (16 June 2009)
- Carman, C.J. (2007); Modelling Petitioner Engagement with the Scottish Parliament’s Petitions System: Procedural Fairness and Participatory Democracy; Working paper presented at 2007 meeting ‘Elections, Public Opinion & Parties’ study group of the Political Studies Association, Bristol 2007. (15 February 2008)

=== Evaluations: The Royal Borough of Kingston upon Thames and Bristol City Council systems ===
- Whyte, A., Renton, A. and Macintosh, A. (2005); e-Petitioning in Kingston and Bristol: Evaluation of e-Petitioning in the Local e-Democracy National Project. (16 June 2009)
- Whyte, A., Renton, A. and Macintosh, A. (2005); eDemocracy from the Top Down: An Evaluation of eDemocracy Activities Initiated by Councils and Government Bristol City Council. Published by Bristol City Council for The Local eDemocracy National Project. (16 June 2009)
- ICELE (2007); Effective petitioning – the internet way; Bristol City Council; Bristol 2007

=== Evaluations: The German Bundestag system ===
- Riehm, U. (2007): Öffentliche Petitionen beim deutschen Bundestag – erste Ergebnisse der Evaluation des Modellversuchs (An Evaluation Study of Public Petitions at the German Parliament – in German). TAB Newsletter no. 32 (2007) pp35–38.
