= George Kerevan =

Scottish journalist, economist, and politician

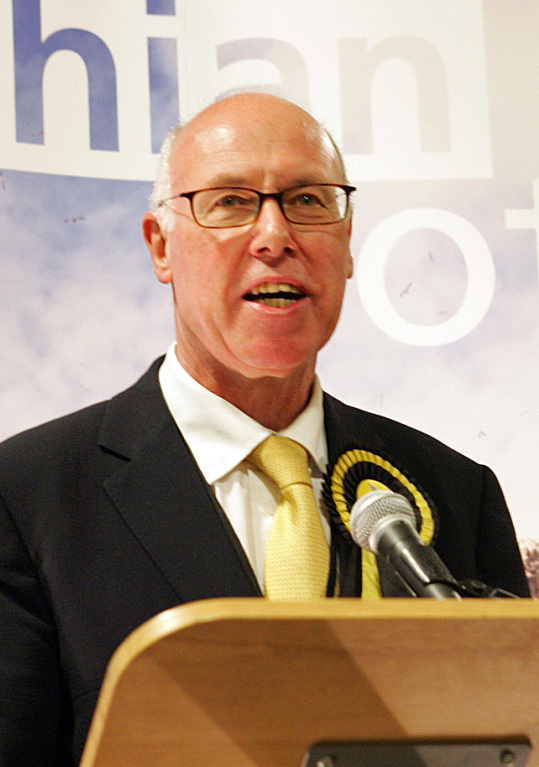
- Kerevan in 2015

Member of Parliament for East Lothian
- In office 8 May 2015 – 3 May 2017
- Preceded by: Fiona O'Donnell
- Succeeded by: Martin Whitfield

Personal details
- Born: 28 September 1949 (age 76) Glasgow, Scotland, UK
- Party: Alba (2021–2026)
- Other political affiliations: IMG (1972–82); SLP (1976); Labour (c. 1982–96); SNP (1996–2021)
- Spouse: Angela Wrapson (m. 1991; died 2019)
- Education: University of Glasgow
- Website: Official website

George Kerevan (born 28 September 1949) is a Scottish journalist, economist, and politician. He was the Scottish National Party Member of Parliament (MP) for East Lothian from 2015, until he lost his seat to Martin Whitfield of the Labour Party at the 2017 general election.

== Early life and education ==
Born in Glasgow, Kerevan was educated at Kingsridge Secondary School in Drumchapel and the University of Glasgow, graduating with a First-class MA degree in political economy.

== Professional career ==
Kerevan held academic posts at Napier College, including Senior Lecturer in Economics, from 1975 to 2000, specialising in energy economics. He was associate editor of The Scotsman from 2000 to 2009, and was the chief executive of What If Productions (Television). He is co-organiser of the Prestwick World Festival of Flight.

== Political career ==
Kerevan was a member of the International Marxist Group (IMG), a Trotskyist group, between 1972 and 1982. During this time, alongside many other Scottish IMG activists, he joined Jim Sillars' fledgling Scottish Labour Party (SLP) using entryist tactics, a process that resulted in a purge of the IMG-associated members by Sillars at the party's first conference in October 1976. Following the demise of the IMG, Kerevan joined the Labour Party and served as a councillor for the party in Edinburgh from 1984 to 1996. In 1996, he left Labour to join the Scottish National Party. He went on to stand unsuccessfully as the SNP candidate for Edinburgh East at the 2010 general election, as well as an SNP candidate in the Lothian region in the 2011 Scottish Parliament election.

Kerevan eventually stood successfully as the SNP candidate for East Lothian at the 2015 general election. He won 25,104 votes, a majority of 6,803, and unseated the then-incumbent Labour MP Fiona O'Donnell. He was a member of the House of Commons Treasury Select Committee. He subsequently lost his seat in the 2017 general election to Martin Whitfield of the Labour Party, who won with a majority of 3,083 votes over Kerevan.

In March 2021, Kerevan defected from the SNP to the Alba Party. He stood for Lothian East at the 2024 general election, where he finished in seventh place out of seven candidates, winning 577 votes and a 1.2% share.

== Selected works ==
Kerevan is the co-author, with Alan Cochrane, of Scottish Independence: Yes or No, published in April 2014.

- Arguments within Scottish Marxism, in The Bulletin of Scottish Politics No. 2, Spring 1981, pp. 111 – 133
- The Collapse of the Scottish Economy, in Dunion, Kevin (ed.), Radical Scotland, February/March 1983, pp. 6 – 8, ISSN 0262-6993
- Kerevan, George (1985). The case for Scottish coal.
- Kerevan, George (1986). The case for retaining a European coal industry: a critical response to the EEC Coal Directorate's close-and-import plan as laid out in COM (85)251 and COM (85)525.
- Kerevan, George (1987). The case for retaining Seafield: a special report on Seafield Colliery and the reasons why Seafield coal is vital to Scotland's energy future.
- Kerevan, George (1988). Scottish coalfields study 1988. Scottish Coal Project.
- Kerevan, George; Scottish Coal Project (1988). A plan for Scotland's energy future. Scottish Coal Project.

Parliament of the United Kingdom
Preceded by Fiona O'Donnell	Member of Parliament for East Lothian; 2015–2017	Succeeded by Martin Whitfield
