= Chichester de Windt Crookshank =

British Army officer and politician

Lieutenant Colonel Chichester de Windt Crookshank KStJ
- Chichester de Windt Crookshank, photographed by Walter Stoneman

Member of Parliament for Berwick and Haddington
- In office 1924–1929
- Preceded by: Robert Spence
- Succeeded by: George Sinkinson

Member of Parliament for Bootle
- In office 1931–1935
- Preceded by: Vivian Henderson
- Succeeded by: Eric Errington

Personal details
- Born: 18 October 1868 British India
- Died: 23 October 1958 (aged 90) Johnstounburn, Humbie, Haddington, East Lothian, Scotland, United Kingdom
- Spouse: Mary Murray Usher (m. 1910)
- Children: Esther Marion Patricia Crookshank (daughter) William Usher Crookshank (son); Arthur Patrick Usher Crookshank (son); George Howard Usher Crookshank (son)
- Parents: Arthur Chichester William Crookshank (father); Mary Elizabeth D' Aguilar (mother)

Military service
- Allegiance: British Army
- Branch/service: Royal Engineers
- Battles/wars: Second Boer War; Battle of Paardeberg

Chichester de Windt Crookshank (18 October 1868 – 23 October 1958) KStJ, was a British Army officer and Unionist Member of Parliament, for Berwick and Haddington from 1924 until 1929; and for Bootle from 1931 until he retired in 1935.

== Military career ==
Crookshank was commissioned a second lieutenant in the Royal Engineers on 23 July 1887, promoted to lieutenant on 23 July 1890, and to captain on 1 April 1898. He served in the Second Boer War, and was slightly wounded in the Battle of Paardeberg in February 1900). He was then attached to the 7th Infantry division of the South Africa Field Force.

== Political career ==
Crookshank was the Unionist Member of Parliament for Berwick and Haddington from 1924. He was unseated in 1929 by George Sinkinson of the Labour Party; and was returned to the House of Commons as Conservative MP for Bootle at the 1931 general election. In 1932 he was assigned as the King's Body Guard. Crookshank retired at the end of that Parliament in 1935.

== Arms ==
Coat of arms of Chichester de Windt Crookshank
Notes Granted 25 March 1925 by Sir Nevile Rodwell Wilkinson, Ulster King of Arms. Crest On a wreath of the colours a dexter cubit arm in armour holding in the hand a dagger in bend sinister Proper hilt and pommel Or. Escutcheon Or three boars' heads erased Sable armed and langued Azure a bordure of the second. Motto Conferre Gladium

== Authorship ==
Crookshank was the author of the 1921 book Prints of British Military Operations, dealing with 52 military operations.

Parliament of the United Kingdom
Preceded by Robert Spence	Member of Parliament for Berwick and Haddington; 1924–1929	Succeeded by George Sinkinson
Preceded by Vivian Henderson	Member of Parliament for Bootle; 1931–1935	Succeeded by Eric Errington
