= Lothian East =

UK Parliament constituency (since 1983)

Coordinates: 55°56′51″N 2°43′35″W

- County constituency for the House of Commons
- Interactive map of boundaries from 2024
- Location of Lothian East within Scotland
- Electorate: 71,287 (March 2020)
- Major settlements: Dunbar, Longniddry, North Berwick, Prestonpans, Tranent, Haddington

Current constituency
- Created: 1983 (as East Lothian)
- Member of Parliament: Douglas Alexander (Labour & Co-operative)
- Created from: Berwick and East Lothian, Edinburgh East and Midlothian

Lothian East (/ˈloʊðiən/; Scots: Lowden East; Scottish Gaelic: Lodainn an Ear) is a constituency in Scotland which returns one Member of Parliament (MP) to the House of Commons of the Parliament of the United Kingdom, elected by the first-past-the-post voting system. The seat has been represented since 2024 by Douglas Alexander of Scottish Labour; he had previously served as the MP for Paisley and Renfrewshire South, formerly Paisley South, from 1997-2015. He has served as Secretary of State for Scotland since 2025.

The constituency was formerly known as East Lothian. It was renamed as a result of the 2023 review of Westminster constituencies and was first contested under the new name at the 2024 general election.

== Boundaries ==
=== East Lothian ===
1983–1997: East Lothian District.

1997–2005: The East Lothian District electoral divisions of Fa'side, Haddington, Luffness, Preston/Levenhall, and Tantallon.

2005–2024: East Lothian Council area.

=== Lothian East ===
2024–present: East Lothian Council area, except for most of the Musselburgh ward, which was transferred to the re-established constituency of Edinburgh East and Musselburgh.

Before the 1983 general election, the area lay in the Berwick and East Lothian constituency.

== Constituency profile ==
The seat covers small towns to the east of Edinburgh including Haddington and Dunbar which have good commuting links to the capital city; and a more rural area extending south into the Lammermuir Hills. Residents' health and wealth are around average for the UK.

== History ==
The constituency was created for the 1983 general election. Until the SNP landslide victory in 2015, the seat had been continuously represented by MPs from the Labour Party since the constituency's creation 32 years earlier. The East Lothian Constituency Labour Party voted on 22 January 2010 to deselect the previous MP Anne Moffat. The National Executive Committee upheld the decision on 23 March 2010. Fiona O'Donnell was elected in 2010 with an increased majority for Labour compared to 2005. O'Donnell lost her seat to George Kerevan of the SNP at the 2015 general election; who was elected with a majority of 6,803 votes.

From 2015-17 the constituency was represented by George Kerevan of the Scottish National Party; he was defeated by Martin Whitfield of the Labour Party by 3,083 votes at the snap general election in 2017. Two years later, at the 2019 general election, Whitfield was defeated by former Scottish National Party MSP and Justice Secretary Kenny MacAskill. On 26 March 2021, MacAskill defected from the SNP to the Alba Party.

MacAskill did not defend his seat at the 2024 general election, Kerevan stood as the Alba Party's candidate instead, and polled last out of all the candidates at that year's general election. In February 2023, Douglas Alexander, a former Cabinet Minister and MP for Paisley and Renfrewshire South/Paisley South, was selected to stand for the Labour Party. He duly gained the seat with a majority of 28% on a swing of 16% from the SNP.

At the 2014 Scottish independence referendum, a majority of voters nationwide opted for Scotland to remain a part of the United Kingdom – with 61.72% of the electorate of East Lothian voting for staying part of the United Kingdom and 38.28% voting for Scottish independence.

== Members of Parliament ==
Election	Party	Member
1983	Labour	John Home Robertson
2001	Labour	Anne Moffat
2010	Labour	Fiona O'Donnell
2015	SNP	George Kerevan
2017	Labour	Martin Whitfield
2019	SNP	Kenny MacAskill
2021	Alba	Kenny MacAskill
2024	Labour	Douglas Alexander

== Elections ==
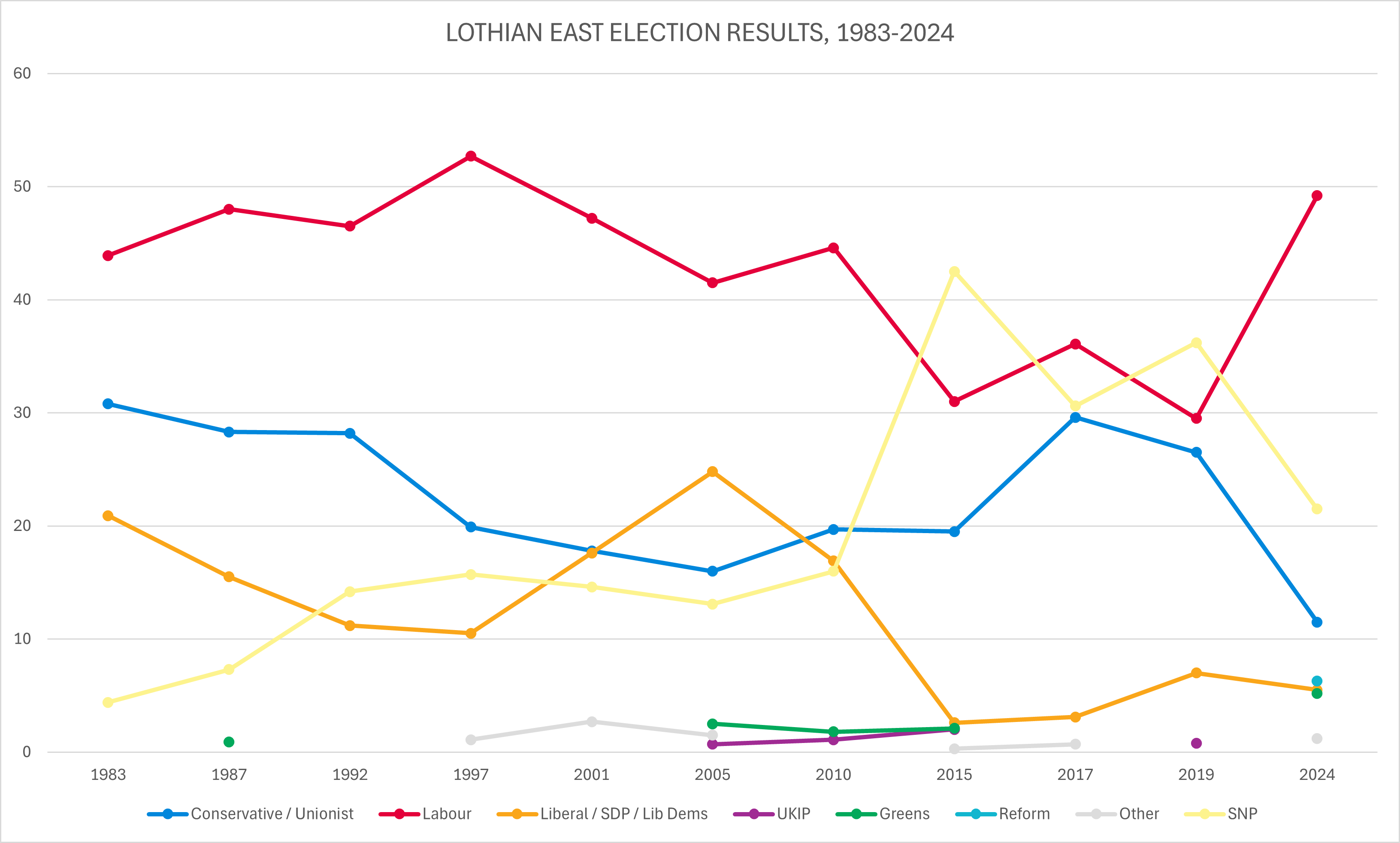
Election results 1983–2024

=== Elections in the 2020s ===
General election 2024: Lothian East
Party	Candidate	Votes	%	±%
Labour Co-op	Douglas Alexander	23,555	49.2	+18.5
SNP	Lyn Jardine	10,290	21.5	−13.4
Conservative	Scott Hamilton	5,535	11.5	−16.0
Reform	Robert Davies	3,039	6.3	New
Liberal Democrats	Duncan Dunlop	2,649	5.5	−0.8
Green	Shona McIntosh	2,477	5.2	New
Alba	George Kerevan	557	1.2	New
Majority		13,265	27.7	N/A
Turnout		48,102	63.4	−8.3
Registered electors		75,546		
Labour Co-op gain from SNP		Swing	+16.0	

=== Elections in the 2010s ===
2019 notional result (Note: Estimate of the 2019 general election result as if the revised boundaries recommended under the 2023 boundary review were in place)
Party	Vote	%
SNP	17,671	34.8
Labour	15,464	30.4
Conservative	13,956	27.5
Liberal Democrats	3,193	6.3
UKIP	493	1.0
Majority	2,207	4.4
Turnout	50,777	71.2
Electorate	71,287	

General election 2019: East Lothian
Party	Candidate	Votes	%	±%
SNP	Kenny MacAskill	21,156	36.2	+5.6
Labour	Martin Whitfield	17,270	29.5	−6.6
Conservative	Craig Hoy	15,523	26.5	−3.1
Liberal Democrats	Robert O'Riordan	4,071	7.0	+3.9
UKIP	David Sisson	493	0.8	New
Majority		3,886	6.7	N/A
Turnout		58,513	71.7	+1.1
SNP gain from Labour		Swing	+6.1	

General election 2017: East Lothian
Party	Candidate	Votes	%	±%
Labour	Martin Whitfield	20,158	36.1	+5.1
SNP	George Kerevan	17,075	30.6	−11.9
Conservative	Sheila Low	16,540	29.6	+10.1
Liberal Democrats	Elisabeth Wilson	1,738	3.1	+0.5
Independent	Mike Allan	367	0.7	+0.4
Majority		3,083	5.5	N/A
Turnout		55,878	70.6	−3.6
Labour gain from SNP		Swing	+8.6	

General election 2015: East Lothian
Party	Candidate	Votes	%	±%
SNP	George Kerevan	25,104	42.5	+26.5
Labour	Fiona O'Donnell	18,301	31.0	−13.6
Conservative	David Roach	11,511	19.5	−0.2
Liberal Democrats	Ettie Spencer	1,517	2.6	−14.3
Green	Jason Rose	1,245	2.1	+0.3
UKIP	Oluf Marshall	1,178	2.0	+0.9
Independent	Mike Allan	158	0.3	New
Majority		6,803	11.5	N/A
Turnout		59,014	74.2	+7.3
SNP gain from Labour		Swing	+20.1	

General election 2010: East Lothian
Party	Candidate	Votes	%	±%
Labour	Fiona O'Donnell	21,919	44.6	+3.1
Conservative	Michael Veitch	9,661	19.7	+3.7
Liberal Democrats	Stuart Ritchie	8,288	16.9	−7.9
SNP	Andrew Sharp	7,883	16.0	+2.9
Green	James Mackenzie	862	1.8	−0.7
UKIP	Jonathan Lloyd	548	1.1	+0.4
Majority		12,258	24.9	+8.2
Turnout		49,161	66.9	+2.4
Labour hold		Swing	−0.3	

=== Elections in the 2000s ===
General election 2005: East Lothian
Party	Candidate	Votes	%	±%
Labour	Anne Moffat	18,983	41.5	−7.4
Liberal Democrats	Chris Butler	11,363	24.8	+7.6
Conservative	William Stevenson	7,315	16.0	±0.0
SNP	Paul McLennan	5,995	13.1	−1.8
Green	Michael Collie	1,132	2.5	New
Scottish Socialist	Gary Galbraith	504	1.1	−0.6
UKIP	Eric Robb	306	0.7	New
Christian Vote	William Thompson	178	0.4	New
Majority		7,620	16.7	−12.9
Turnout		45,776	64.5	+3.6
Labour hold		Swing	−7.5	

General election 2001: East Lothian
Party	Candidate	Votes	%	±%
Labour	Anne Picking	17,407	47.2	−5.5
Conservative	Hamish Mair	6,577	17.8	−2.1
Liberal Democrats	Judith Hayman	6,506	17.6	+7.1
SNP	Hilary Brown	5,381	14.6	−1.1
Scottish Socialist	Derrick White	624	1.7	New
Socialist Labour	James Herriot	376	1.0	New
Majority		10,830	29.4	−3.4
Turnout		36,871	62.5	−13.1
Labour hold		Swing		

=== Elections in the 1990s ===
General election 1997: East Lothian
Party	Candidate	Votes	%	±%
Labour	John Home Robertson	22,881	52.7	+6.2
Conservative	Murdo Fraser	8,660	19.9	−8.3
SNP	David R. McCarthy	6,825	15.7	+1.5
Liberal Democrats	Alison MacAskill	4,575	10.5	−0.7
Referendum	Norman S. Nash	491	1.1	New
Majority		14,221	32.8	+14.5
Turnout		43,432	75.6	−6.8
Labour hold		Swing		

General election 1992: East Lothian
Party	Candidate	Votes	%	±%
Labour	John Home Robertson	25,537	46.5	−1.5
Conservative	James P. Hepburne-Scott	15,501	28.2	−0.1
SNP	George R. Thomson	7,776	14.2	+6.9
Liberal Democrats	Tim McKay	6,126	11.2	−4.3
Majority		10,036	18.3	−1.4
Turnout		54,940	82.4	+3.7
Labour hold		Swing	−0.7	

=== Elections in the 1980s ===
General election 1987: East Lothian
Party	Candidate	Votes	%	±%
Labour	John Home Robertson	24,583	48.0	+4.1
Conservative	Stanley Langdon	14,378	28.3	−2.5
Liberal	Andrew Robinson	7,929	15.5	−5.4
SNP	Alexander Burgon-Lyon	3,727	7.3	+2.9
Green	Angus Marland	451	0.9	New
Majority		10,105	19.7	+6.6
Turnout		51,068	78.7	+2.3
Labour hold		Swing	+3.3	

General election 1983: East Lothian
Party	Candidate	Votes	%	±%
Labour	John Home Robertson	20,934	43.9	−7.4
Conservative	Michael Fry	14,693	30.8	−0.9
Liberal	Michael Kibby	9,950	20.9	+12.4
SNP	Roger Knox	2,083	4.4	−4.1
Majority		6,241	13.1	−6.5
Turnout		47,660	76.4	
Labour win (new seat)				
