= Bernard Crick =

British political theorist (1929–2008)

Sir Bernard Crick
- Born: 16 December 1929; England
- Died: 19 December 2008 (aged 79); Edinburgh, Scotland
- Partner(s): Joyce Crick (1953–1976); Una Maclean

Academic background
- Education: University College London (B.Sc.); London School of Economics (PhD)

Sir Bernard Rowland Crick (16 December 1929 – 19 December 2008) was a British political theorist and democratic socialist whose views can be summarised as "politics is ethics done in public". He sought to arrive at a "politics of action", as opposed to a "politics of thought" or of ideology, and he held that "political power is power in the subjunctive mood." He was a leading critic of behaviouralism.

Crick is today popularly remembered for having written the first version of the controversial Life in the UK test, a requirement to obtain British citizenship but criticised since its inception for its factual errors and misrepresentations.

== Career ==
Crick was born at 77, Circle Gardens, Merton, London, the son of Harry Edgar Crick (died 1968), an insurance official, and Florence Clara, née Cook (died 1987). He was educated at Whitgift School in Croydon. He read Economics at University College London, switching to Government in his third year and obtaining a Bachelor of Science (B.Sc.) degree before transferring to the London School of Economics for doctoral study. While working on his Ph.D.—published in 1958 as The American Science of Politics—he was a Teaching Fellow at Harvard (1952–1954), Assistant Professor at McGill (1954–1955), and Visiting Fellow at Berkeley (1955–1956). Returning to the United Kingdom in 1956, he avoided national service by "pretending to be barmy", going on to obtain his Ph.D. at the LSE. He was appointed to an Assistant Lectureship there in 1957, later being promoted to Lecturer and then Senior Lecturer.

During his period at the LSE, recollections of which appear in his contribution to My LSE, Crick craved for greater recognition than his Senior Lecturership signified. LSE's promotion system was notoriously slow at the time. When appointed Professor of Political Theory and Political Institutions at Sheffield in 1965, Crick told Beaver, the LSE student newspaper, that he was "going to a better place from the point of view of teaching students".

Crick was an advisor to British Labour Party leader Neil Kinnock during the 1980s. When Labour came to power in 1997, Crick was appointed by his former student David Blunkett to head up an advisory group on citizenship education. The group's final report in 1998, known as the Crick Report, led to the introduction of citizenship as a core subject in the National Curriculum. He was knighted in the 2002 new years honours list for "services to citizenship in schools and to political studies". He authored the 2004 Home Office book Life in the United Kingdom: A Journey to Citizenship, which forms the basis for the new citizenship test required by all people naturalising as British citizens.

He taught at the University of Sheffield (1965–1971). and founded a Department of Politics and Sociology, later the Department of Politics, at Birkbeck College, University of London in 1972.

Crick co-authored, with David Millar, an influential pamphlet entitled Making Scotland's Parliament Work. Later in his life in Scotland, Crick was delighted to be appointed Stevenson Visiting Professor at Glasgow University. Despite his frail health at that time, Crick delivered a series of widely praised and very popular public lectures. Upon his death, Glasgow University marked his contribution by establishing the Bernard Crick Memorial Lecture.

Crick made many other contributions to Scottish political life, from participating in his local Labour Party, to defending Glenogle Baths from closure, to, in his last weeks of life, penning a humorous Op-Ed for The Scotsman on the chaos caused by the tram line delays in Edinburgh.

== Private life ==
Crick died from prostate cancer at the age of 79, in St. Columba's Hospice, Edinburgh. It had been diagnosed about fourteen years earlier.

== Awards and legacy ==
The PSA also created the Sir Bernard Crick Awards for Outstanding Teaching in honour of Crick and his work. Two awards are made at the PSA Annual Conference, the Main Prize, and a New Entrant Prize for early career academics.

Crick was knighted in 2002.

After his death, the University of Sheffield established the Sir Bernard Crick Centre. The centre aims to 'Bridge a number of gaps that appear to have emerged in recent decades (if not before). The first gap concerns the relationship between the governors and the governed in democratic countries.' The centre also aims to communicate social science to the public – or the social implications of 'hard' scientific advances – without, in doing so, losing those elements of scholarship that provide depth and context.

Glasgow University also recognised Sir Bernard's contribution by establishing an annual memorial lecture series.

== Work on George Orwell ==
In 1974, Crick began working on a biography of George Orwell with the help of Orwell's second wife Sonia Brownell. The hardback edition rights were used to set up a grant in conjunction with Birkbeck College to fund projects by new writers that would have interested Orwell. In 1980, just before the book was published, a friend of Crick's, David Astor, agreed to match the grant. Over the years, there were contributions by Richard Blair, Orwell's adopted son, and The Observer newspaper, among others. Due to a lack of discernible projects, after five years the fund was diverted to produce an annual memorial lecture at Birkbeck College and the University of Sheffield, and also to provide small departmental grants.

The lectures continue: they are now hosted each year by the Orwell Foundation (originally established by Crick as the Orwell Prize; see below) at University College London, home of the Orwell Archive; in November 2016 the Orwell Lecture was given by Ian Hislop. Previous lecturers include Rowan Williams and Hilary Mantel. In 2017, the Orwell Foundation and the Sir Bernard Crick Centre re-established a new Orwell Lecture in the North at the University of Sheffield: the inaugural lecture was given by Turner Prize-winning artist Grayson Perry.

In 1993, Crick established the Orwell Prize with sponsorship from The Political Quarterly to honour political writing. Initially, two awards were given out each year – one for political journalism and the other for a political book. The first awards in 1994 were received by Anatol Lieven for his book The Baltic Revolution and to The Independent on Sunday journalist Neal Ascherson. Crick was on the judging panel until the 2007 awards. BBC official historian Professor Jean Seaton became Director of the prize in 2006 and the prize became a registered charity (The Orwell Foundation) in 2015. The Foundation awards four Orwell Prizes – for political journalism, political writing (non-fiction only), political fiction and Exposing Britain's Social Evils – and hosts regular debates, lectures and events, including the Orwell Lecture. Judging panels are appointed each year. In 2008, Crick became active in supporting "Orwell Direct", a website dedicated to the life and works of Orwell created by Dione Venables, which later became The Orwell Society.

== Ideas ==
According to Crick, the ideologically driven leader practises a form of anti-politics in which the goal is the mobilisation of the populace towards a common end—even on pain of death.

== Anti-behaviouralism ==
Crick's first book, The American Science of Politics (1959), attacked the behavioural approach to politics, which was dominant in the United States, and little known in Britain. He identified and rejected their basic premises: that research can discover uniformities in human behaviour, that these uniformities could be confirmed by empirical tests and measurements, that quantitative data was of the highest quality, and should be analysed statistically, that political science should be empirical and predictive, downplaying the philosophical and historical dimensions, and the value-free research was the ideal, with the goal of social science to be a macro theory covering all the social sciences, as opposed to applied issues of practical reform.

== Publications ==
Crick's works include:

- The American Science of Politics (1959)
- In Defence of Politics (1962, and five subsequent editions, the last in 2002)
- Political Theory and Practice (1963)
- The Reform of Parliament (1964)
- Parliament and the people (with Sally Jenkinson) (1966)
- Essays on Reform (1967)
- Crime, Rape and Gin: Reflections on Contemporary Attitudes to Violence, and Addiction (1974)
- Essays on Political Education (with Derek Heater) (1977)
- George Orwell: A Life (1980; revised 1982; revised and updated edition, 1992)
- Socialist Values and Time (1984)
- Socialism (1987)
- What is Politics? (with Tom Crick)
- The Labour Party's Aims and Values: an unofficial statement (with David Blunkett) (1988)
- Essays on Politics and Literature (1989)
- Political Thoughts and Polemics (1990)
- To Make the Parliament of Scotland a Model for Democracy (with David Millar) (1995)
- Education for Citizenship and the Teaching of Democracy in Schools (aka The Crick Report) (1998)
- Crossing Borders: Political Essays (2001)
- Democracy: A Very Short Introduction (2002)
- The Commons in Transition (with A. H. Hanson) (1970)
- The Future of the Social Services (with William Robson) (1970)
- Protest and Discontent (1970)
- Taxation Policy (with William A. Robson) (1973)
- The Discourses by Niccolò Machiavelli (1974)
- Political Education and Political Literacy (with Alex Porter) (1978)
- Unemployment (1980)
- National identities: the constitution of the United Kingdom (1991)
- Citizens: Towards a Citizenship Culture (2001)
- Education for Democratic Citizenship (with Andrew Lockyer) (2003)
