= John Mackintosh (Scottish politician) =

Scottish politician (1929–1978)

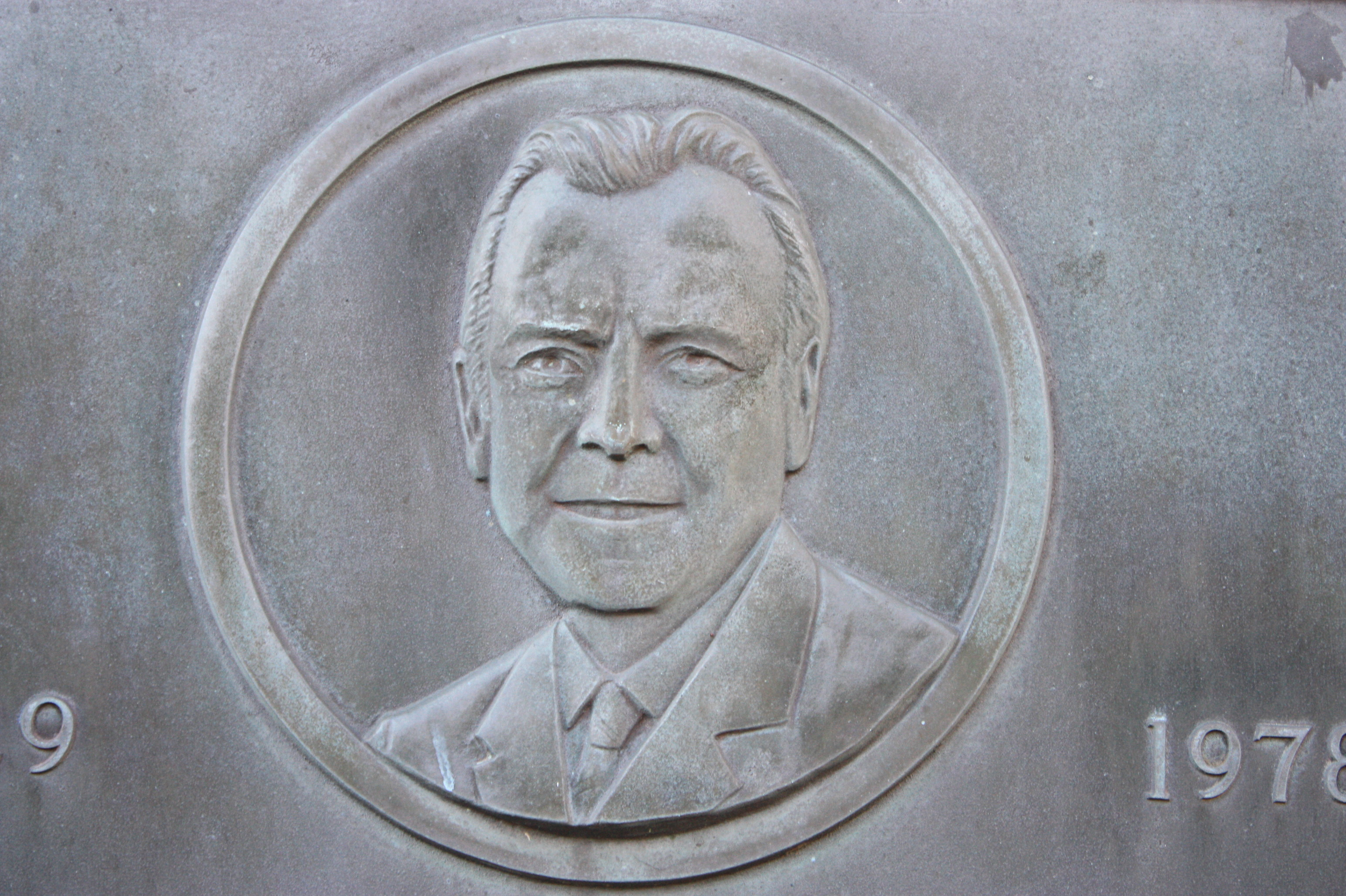
- Detail of memorial plaque in Gifford, East Lothian

Member of Parliament for Berwick and East Lothian
- In office 10 October 1974 – 30 July 1978
- Preceded by: Michael Ancram
- Succeeded by: John Home Robertson
- In office 31 March 1966 – 8 February 1974
- Preceded by: William Anstruther-Gray
- Succeeded by: Michael Ancram

Personal details
- Born: John Pitcairn Mackintosh; 24 August 1929 Simla, British Raj (now Shimla, India)
- Died: 30 July 1978 (aged 48) Edinburgh, Scotland
- Party: Labour
- Spouses: Janette Robertson (m. 1957; div. 1963) Una Maclean (m. 1963)
- Children: 4
- Education: University of Edinburgh; Balliol College, Oxford; Princeton University
- Profession: Academic

John Pitcairn Mackintosh (24 August 1929 – 30 July 1978) was a Scottish academic, author and Labour politician known for his advocacy of political devolution, at a time when it was anathema to the Labour leadership, and for his pro-Europeanism. He advanced the concept of dual nationality: that Scots could be both Scottish and British, and indeed European. He was the Member of Parliament (MP) for Berwick and East Lothian from 1966 to February 1974 and again from October 1974 until his death.

== Early life and career ==
Mackintosh was born in Simla, India, and raised in Edinburgh from the age of ten. He was educated at Melville College, and obtained degrees in history from the University of Edinburgh; in philosophy, politics and economics from Balliol College, Oxford; and in history at Princeton University, where he held the Sir John Dill Memorial Fellowship. His correspondence from his time at Princeton showed his deep dismay over the rise of McCarthyism and the election of Dwight D. Eisenhower as president. Upon his return to Scotland, Mackintosh was a lecturer at the University of Glasgow from 1953 to 1954, followed by seven years at the University of Edinburgh.

At Edinburgh, he married Janette Robinson, a former student, in 1957, and they had two children. Mackintosh moved to Nigeria in 1961, where he was a senior lecturer in government at the University of Ibadan for two years. He then lectured again at Glasgow until 1965, when he became Professor of Politics at the University of Strathclyde.

== Political career ==
Mackintosh, standing as a Labour Party candidate, contested Edinburgh Pentlands in 1959 and Berwick and East Lothian in 1964. He was elected Member of Parliament for Berwick and East Lothian in 1966 as Labour won a landslide victory nationwide. At the February 1974 general election he lost his seat (against the national trend) to Michael Ancram of the Conservative Party, but regained it merely months later at the October 1974 election.

Later, Mackintosh additionally became chair and professor of politics at the University of Edinburgh, where he managed to balance his duties in the House of Commons with teaching students, a role he enjoyed. He was a strong supporter of formal lectures and would deliver his remarks written out all in longhand. This style of presentation did his students no harm: during the last year of his life he taught an introductory undergraduate course on political philosophy in 20 lectures; at the end of this series, the students gave him a standing ovation.

He wrote widely in the academic press and also for the educated general reader. He first wrote on devolution in 1966, publishing The Devolution of Power. His best known book, however, was The British Cabinet, first published in 1968. Other works include: The Government and Politics of Britain (1970), revised twice; Nigerian Government and Politics (1968); and the edited British Prime Ministers in the Twentieth Century (1977). He was a prolific academic writer and authored scores of academic analyses.

Mackintosh had a regular column in The Times and The Scotsman newspapers. He was an accomplished broadcaster and lecturer, appearing regularly on television and giving public lectures. He was also the editor of The Political Quarterly, and chairman of the Hansard Society.

== Personal life and death ==
While in Ibadan, Mackintosh met Una Maclean, a doctor and anthropologist; they married in 1963, the same year his first marriage was dissolved. He and Maclean had two children of their own, in addition to two children he had from his first marriage and three children she had from a prior marriage.

In 1977, a tumour was found in Mackintosh's heart. He underwent heart surgery at the Royal Infirmary of Edinburgh. While his initial prognosis was optimistic, it was subsequently determined that his condition was terminal, though he continued to work as he much as he was able to. On 24 July 1978, he collapsed at his home after experiencing chest pains, and died at Western General Hospital in Edinburgh six days later, on 30 July, at the age of 48. In the ensuing by-election to the Berwick and East Lothian constituency, his seat was won by John Home Robertson.

== Legacy ==
Mackintosh was a forceful proponent of devolution to Scotland. He famously said in the House of Commons in 1976: "People in Scotland want a degree of government for themselves. It is not beyond the wit of man to devise the institutions to meet these demands." This quote is engraved on the threshold of the Donald Dewar Room at Holyrood. Dewar himself, when First Minister of Scotland, said of John Mackintosh's lifelong belief in devolution:

"His ideas had a lasting influence. ....[He] was a powerful advocate for devolution...John was something of a prophet, a mighty champion of reform at a time when constitutional change was not an approved and certainly not a fashionable cause. At the core he always placed democratic control, the empowering of the people. He did not base his argument on nationalism. It was not the glorification of the Nation state. It was never Scotland right or wrong. His vision was good government, an equitable democracy, that borrowed, elevated, created opportunity for the citizen."

A memorial lecture was founded by Arthur Greenan, his friends in the constituency, and colleagues in the University of Edinburgh. The lecture is held every year, alternating between East Lothian and the University of Edinburgh. Past speakers have included Jack McConnell, John Kenneth Galbraith, Neil Kinnock, John Smith, Donald Dewar, and Gordon Brown, among others.

Mackintosh's focus on Scottish devolution has also been discussed in The Scotsman by Iain Gray, former leader of Scottish Labour.

After his death, two volumes of essays were published: Mackintosh on Scotland, edited by Henry Drucker (1982), and Mackintosh on Parliament and Social Democracy, edited by David Marquand (1983).

== Sources ==
- Times Guide to the House of Commons October 1974
- Leigh Rayment's Historical List of MPs

Parliament of the United Kingdom
Preceded by William Anstruther-Gray	Member of Parliament for Berwick and East Lothian; 1966–February 1974	Succeeded by Michael Ancram
Preceded by Michael Ancram	Member of Parliament for Berwick and East Lothian; October 1974–1978	Succeeded by John Home Robertson
