= Robert Spence (British politician) =

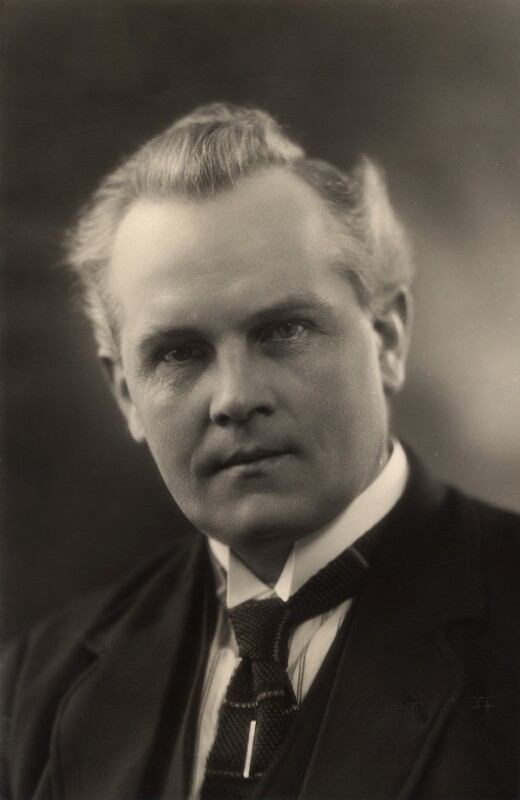
Spence in 1924

Robert Spence (1879 – 1 February 1965) was a Labour Party politician in the United Kingdom. He was the member of parliament (MP) for Berwick and Haddington in Scotland from 1923 to 1924.

Born at Airdrie, Spence was educated at McIntyre's School, Glasgow and the Scottish Labour College. A Clydebank engineer, Spence was secretary and parliamentary agent of the Scottish Temperance Alliance and president of the National Association of Temperance Officials.

Spence unsuccessfully contested East Renfrewshire at the 1918 general election, and was unsuccessful again when he contested Berwick and Haddington in 1922. He won the seat at the 1923 general election by a narrow margin of 68 votes (0.3% of the total), but was defeated at the next general election, in 1924, and did not stand for Parliament again.

Parliament of the United Kingdom
Preceded by Walter Waring	Member of Parliament for Berwick & Haddington; 1923 – 1924	Succeeded by Chichester Crookshank
