= George Sinkinson =

George Sinkinson (25 November 1874 – 14 January 1939) was a Labour Party politician who served as the member of parliament (MP) for Berwick and Haddington.

Born in Kendal, Sinkinson began working at the age of 10 in a jute mill, where he remained until the age of 13. He then was an apprentice as a machine printer in News office in Barrow, before taking a job as a clerk in Vickers shipyard for several years. He relocated to Glasgow and was employed in steel works for 15 years, during which period he became active in the socialist movement. During the First World War, he was a store-keeper in a shipyard on the Clyde. He relocated to Edinburgh in 1919. He served on Edinburgh Trades Council, and was also active in the Independent Labour Party, chairing its East of Scotland federation.

Sinkinson was elected at the general election of 1929, but lost his seat in the National Government landslide of 1931. In 1929, he left a Christian Science church before a service of thanksgiving for the recovery of King George VI to draw attention to the fact that the King had 11 doctors while many did not have access to healthcare.

After his defeat, he remained active in politics as Labour organiser in Berwick and Haddington.

He wrote three unpublished novels.

Parliament of the United Kingdom
Preceded by Chichester Crookshank	Member of Parliament for Berwick and Haddington; 1929–1931	Succeeded by John McEwen
