= Combined Scottish Universities by-election =

Combined Scottish Universities by-election may refer to one six parliamentary by-elections held for the three-seat British House of Commons constituency called the "Combined Scottish Universities":

- 1927 Combined Scottish Universities by-election
- 1934 Combined Scottish Universities by-election
- 1935 Combined Scottish Universities by-election
- 1936 Combined Scottish Universities by-election
- 1938 Combined Scottish Universities by-election
- 1945 Combined Scottish Universities by-election
- 1946 Combined Scottish Universities by-election

== See also ==
- Combined Scottish Universities (UK Parliament constituency)
