= 1945 United Kingdom general election in Scotland =

- 5 July 1945

All 74 Scottish seats to the House of Commons
- Turnout: 69.0% (▼3.6 pp)
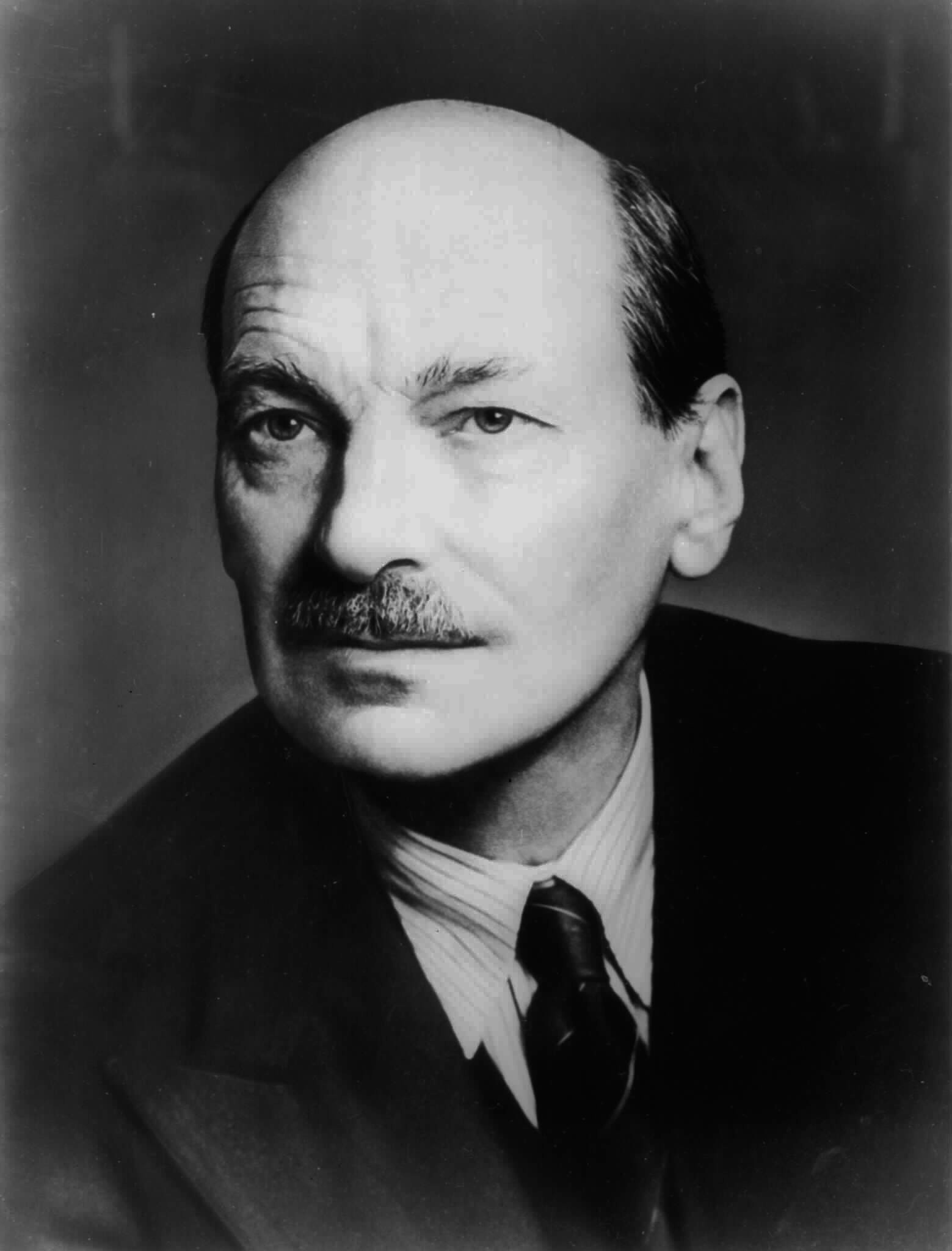

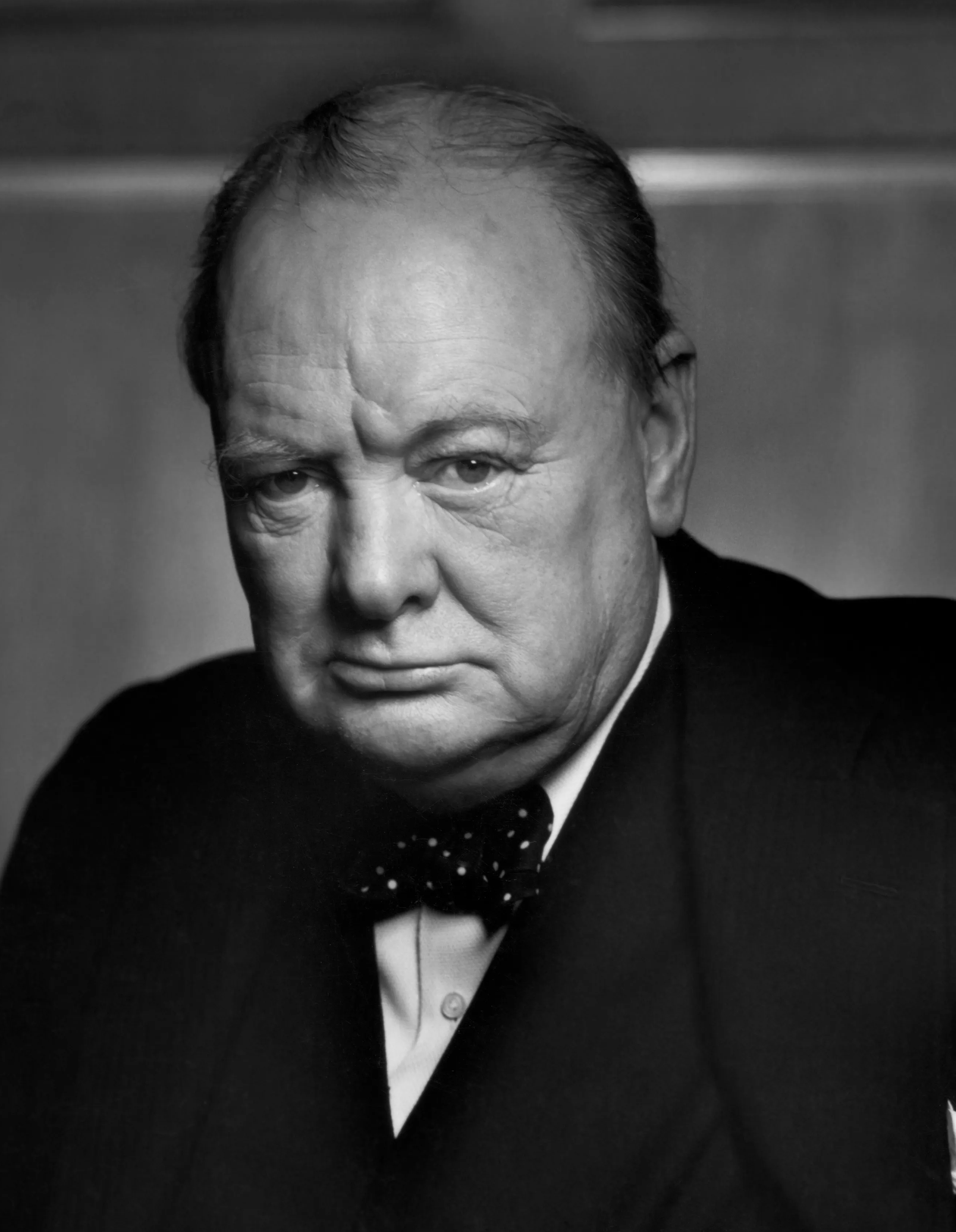

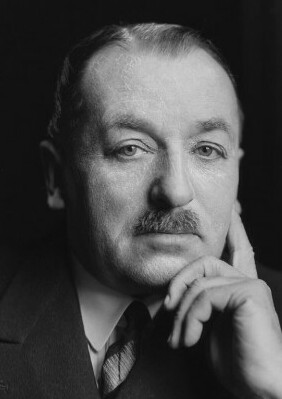

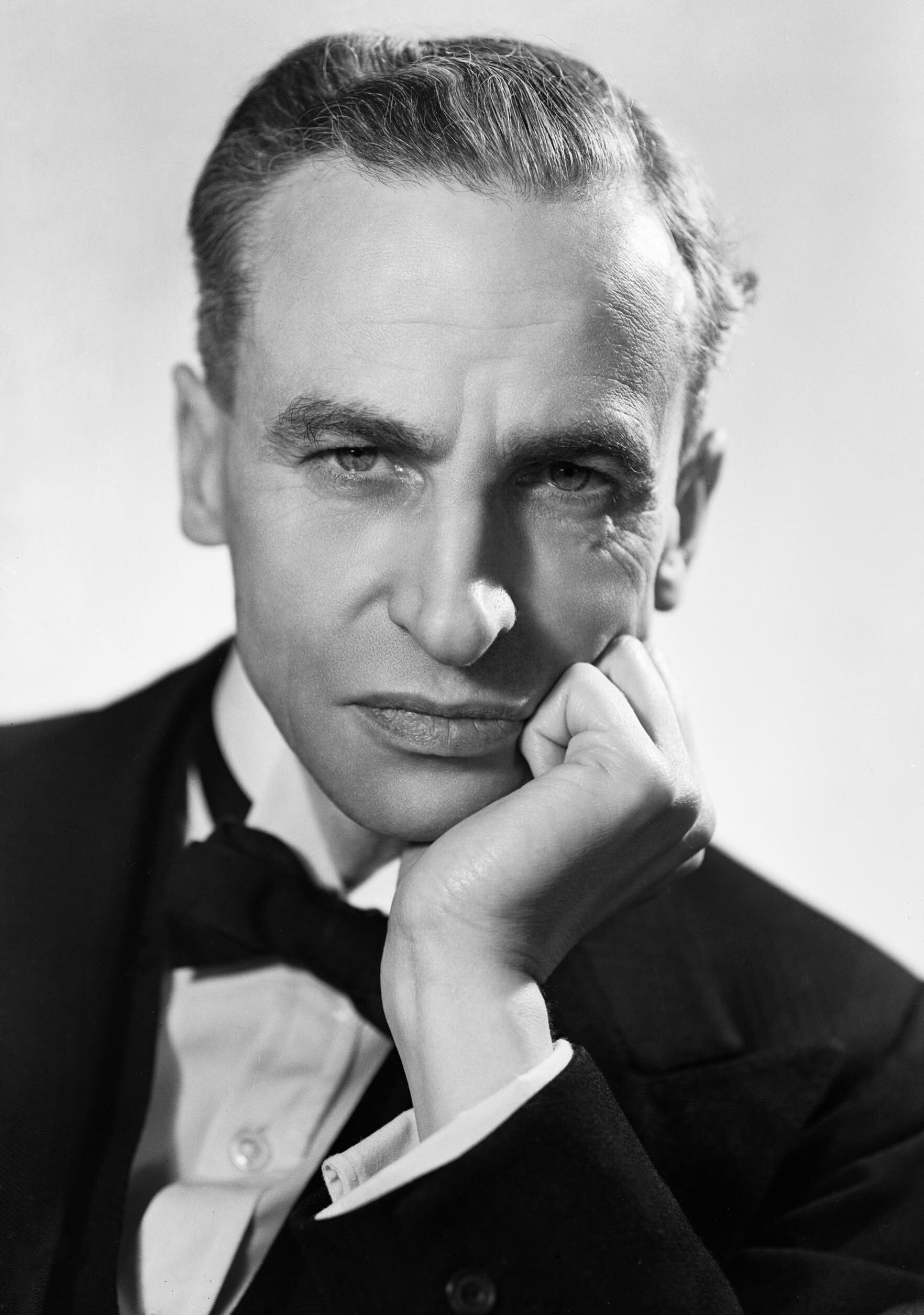
	First party	Second party	Third party
Leader	Clement Attlee	Winston Churchill	Ernest Brown
Party	Labour	Unionist	National Liberal
Alliance		Conservative & Churchill Caretaker Ministry	Churchill Caretaker Ministry
Leader since	25 October 1935	9 October 1940	1940
Leader's seat	Limehouse	Woodford	Leith (lost seat)
Last election	20 seats, (Note: Combined results for burgh, county and university seats) 36.8%	37 seats, 42.0%	8 seats, 6.7%
Seats won	37	25	3
Seat change	▲17	▼12	▼5
Popular vote	1,144,310 (Note: Total and percentage votes given here are for territorial constituencies only)	878,206	85,937
Percentage	47.9%	36.7%	3.6%
Swing	▲11.1 pp	▼5.3 pp	▼3.1 pp
	Fourth party	Fifth party
	ILP
Leader	Bob Edwards	Archibald Sinclair
Party	Ind. Labour Party	Liberal
Alliance		Liberal
Leader since	1943	26 November 1935
Leader's seat	Did not stand	Caithness and Sutherland (lost seat)
Last election	4 seats, 5.0%	3 seats, 6.7%
Seats won	3	0
Seat change	▼1	▼3
Popular vote	40,725	132,849
Percentage	1.7%	5.6%
Swing	▼3.3 pp	▼1.1 pp

On Thursday 5 July 1945, the 1945 United Kingdom general election was held in Scotland, to elect all 640 members of the House of Commons, with 74 seats being in Scotland. 71 seats (32 burgh constituencies and 38 county constituencies) (Note: One burgh seat, Dundee, was represented by two members of parliament.) represented territorial constituencies. There was also one university constituency, which elected an additional 3 members using the Single Transferable Vote (STV) method.

As voters in university constituencies voted under a different system, and in addition to their territorial vote, the results are compiled separately. This was the final election in which the Combined Scottish Universities constituency had seats in the House of Commons. The practice was abolished for the 1950 general election by the Representation of the People Act 1948, making this the last election in which plural voting was permitted.

Held less than two months following VE Day, this was the first general election since 1935, as general elections had been suspended by Parliament during the Second World War. Clement Attlee, the leader of the Labour Party, refused Winston Churchill's offer of continuing the wartime coalition until the Allied defeat of Japan. On 15 June, King George VI dissolved Parliament, which had been sitting for nearly ten years without an election. Counting for the election was not completed until 26 July (three weeks after polling day) to enable those stationed overseas to vote.

As it was the first general election held since the conclusion of the Second World War and nearly 10 years since the 1935 general election, it was the first of three elections during the reign of King George VI.

== Candidates ==
Below is a table summarising the candidates of the 1945 general election in Scotland, excluding those in the Combined Scottish Universities constituency.

Affiliation	Candidates
Labour Party	68
Unionist Party	62
Scottish Liberal Party	22
Scottish National Party	8
Liberal National Party	6 (Note: The candidates that stood were Niall Macpherson in Dumfriesshire, James Henderson in Dunfermline Burghs, James Henderson-Stewart in East Fife, Chairman and Leader of the Liberal National Party Ernest Brown in Leith, John Maclay in Montrose Burghs and Robert Scott Stevenson in West Fife.)
Communist Party of Great Britain	5 (Note: The candidates that stood were Bob Cooney in Glasgow Central, Peter Kerrigan in Glasgow Shettleston, former General Secretary John Ross Campbell in Greenock, John McArthur in Kirkcaldy Burghs and Willie Gallacher in West Fife.)
Independent Labour Party	3 (Note: The candidates that stood were former Chair James Maxton in Glasgow Bridgeton, Campbell Stephen in Glasgow Camlachie and John McGovern in Glasgow Shettleston.)
Independent Liberal	2 (Note: The candidates that stood were in Murdoch Macdonald in Inverness and John MacLeod in Ross and Cromarty.)
Common Wealth Party	2 (Note: The candidates that stood were William John Voisey-Youldon in Glasgow Pollok and Kitty Wintringham in Midlothian and Peebles Northern.)
Independent	2 (Note: The candidates that stood were Isaac Queen in Glasgow Shettleston and Allan Richard Eagles in Paisley.)
Independent Unionist	1 (Note: Candidate John Mackie stood in Galloway.)
Protestant Action Society	1 (Note: Candidate John Cormack stood in Leith.)
United Socialist Movement	1 (Note: Founder and Leader of the United Socialist Movement Guy Aldred stood in Glasgow Central.)
Independent Scottish Nationalist	1 (Note: Candidate Hume Sleigh stood in Edinburgh Central.)
Total	184

== Outcome ==
=== Labour and Unionist ===
In Scotland, Labour gained 17 seats to hold a total of 37, winning ten more than the combined total of territorial seats won by parties making up the defeated National Government. When combined with results from across the UK, Labour secured a majority of 146, with Clement Attlee replacing Winston Churchill as prime minister. In Scotland, the Labour Party gained Glasgow Kelvingrove, Dunbartonshire, Lanark, North Lanarkshire, West Renfrewshire, Rutherglen, Edinburgh North, Edinburgh Central, Peebles and Southern Midlothian and Berwick and Haddington from the Unionist Party. Labour also gained one of the two seats in Dundee from the Unionists.

Additionally, Labour won the seat of Kilmarnock from National Labour. National Labour had been dissolved in June 1945 and therefore did not contest any of its seats; however, four of the five remaining incumbents of the party re-contested seats in the election in England under different candidate labels but were all defeated. The fifth total former member, Kenneth Lindsay who had represented Kilmarnock as part of National Labour in Scotland, stood and won as an independent candidate instead in the Combined English Universities constituency, winning one of the two available seats.

The Unionist Party, in affiliation with the Conservative Party and under the alliance of the Churchill Caretaker Ministry, also lost one seat in the Combined Scottish Universities constituency. One of the two Unionists Members of Parliament, Noel Skelton died causing the 1936 Combined Scottish Universities by-election in which Ramsay MacDonald would take the seat for National Labour, then only for National John Anderson to take the seat at the 1938 Combined Scottish Universities by-election after the death of Ramsay in 1937. John Anderson retained the seat, and therefore represented a gain from the Unionist Party, but sat with the Conservatives and Unionists within the National Government and Churchill's post-war ministry. National candidate and Minister Andrew Duncan, who had won one of the two seats in City of London at the 1940 City of London by-election, retained his seat as a National and therefore represented a gain from the Conservatives. Together with Minister Andrew Duncan in England, he and Duncan represented the two National gains across the United Kingdom.

Notably, the Chair of the Unionist Party, John Craik-Henderson, lost his seat in England to the Labour candidate and future Chair of the Labour Party Alice Bacon.

=== Liberals and Liberal Nationals ===
The Liberal National Party retained the three seats of Dumfriesshire, East Fife and Montrose Burghs. However, the Labour party gained Greenock and Leith. In the seat of Greenock, Labour candidate Robert Gibson had initially gained the seat in the 1936 Greenock by-election from the Liberal Nationals. Labour candidate and future Secretary of State for Scotland Hector McNeil then won the seat again in the 1941 Greenock by-election, after Gibson resigned the seat upon his appointment to the Land Court. The retention of Greenock in this election was therefore a gain for Labour when compared to the previous election. The Chairman and Leader of the Liberal National Party Ernest Brown was the Member of Parliament for Leith, and therefore lost his seat. The Liberal National Party also lost a seat in the Combined Scottish Universities constituency, George Morrison resigned his seat in 1945, causing the 1945 Combined Scottish Universities by-election only months before the general election. Independent John Boyd Orr won the seat at the by-election and retained it at the general election, representing a gain from the Liberal National Party at this election.

Separately, the Scottish Liberal Party in affiliation with the Liberal Party, who had during the 1930s suffered a series of splits over the issue of whether to support the National Government, remained fractured. The Scottish Liberals lost Caithness and Sutherland to the Unionist Party, with Leader of the Liberal Party Archibald Sinclair placing third behind the Unionists and Labour and losing the seat by only sixty-one votes in a very tight three-way contest. He had held the seat since 1922. This was the last general election in which a major party leader lost their seat, until 2019 wherein Jo Swinson, the Leader of the Liberal Democrats which is the successor party to the Liberal Party, lost her seat of East Dunbartonshire. Labour also gained the other of its two seats in Dundee from the Liberal Party.

Finally, the Liberals lost Paisley to the Labour. The serving Member of Parliament, Joseph Maclay, did not re-contest the seat, with the Scottish Liberal Party choosing Louise Glen-Coats at the candidate. However, Labour candidate Oliver Baldwin (also known at the time as Viscount Corvedale), a son of former Prime Minister Stanley Baldwin, won the seat. Consequently, the Scottish Liberal Party lost all representation in Scotland at the election.

=== Minor Parties and independents ===
Two further seats were gained by Independent Liberals from the Liberal National Party. John MacLeod under the Ross-shire Liberal Association won the seat of Ross and Cromarty. Between the last election and this one, the former Member of Parliament Ian Macpherson for Ross and Cromarty, a Liberal National, died causing the 1936 Ross and Cromarty by-election. National Labour had won the by-election, with prominent National Labour politician Malcolm MacDonald, the son of former Prime Minister Ramsay MacDonald, winning the seat and returning to Parliament after having lost his seat in 1935. Malcolm MacDonald became leader of National Labour in 1937 following the death of his father; however, in this election, as MacDonald had supported the dissolution of National Labour, neither he nor National Labour re-contested the seat. MacLeod's win represented a gain from the National Liberals, which also did not re-contest the seat. MacLeod, however, although would sit as an Independent Liberal and would hold the seat until 1964 and describe himself later as being in association with the Conservatives and Liberal Nationals (which later renamed itself the National Liberal Party in 1947). Independent Liberal candidate Murdoch Macdonald also won the seat of Inverness. Macdonald, formerly a member of the Scottish Liberal Party and then former Liberal National Party, stood and won the seat which he had held since 1922, representing a gain from the Liberal National Party compared to the last election.

The Independent Labour Party lost one seat, returning three Members of Parliament at the election. Sitting members Campbell Stephen, former chairman James Maxton and John McGovern successfully re-contested their seats, which were the only constituencies contested by the party. However, long-serving Member of Parliament George Buchanan, a former member elected as part of the Independent Labour Party, defected back to the Labour Party in 1939. His re-election in Glasgow Gorbals represented a gain from the Independent Labour Party. Scotland's only Communist Member of Parliament, Willie Gallacher, retained his West Fife seat.

Long-serving Unionist John Mackie, the sitting Member of Parliament for Galloway, was refused the Unionist nomination for this election, but gained re-election as an Independent Unionist. The Conservative whip was restored in 1948 and he continued to represent Galloway as a member of the Unionist Party until his death.

The Scottish National Party failed to hold Motherwell (the first seat the party had ever gained), which Robert McIntyre had won only a few months earlier in the 1945 Motherwell by-election.

== Seat summary ==
Below is a table summarising the total number of seats, gains and losses for each party in both the territorial county and burgh constituencies and the Combined Scottish Universities constituency.

Party	Seats				
Party	Total	Gains	Losses	Net	Of total (%)
Labour	37	17	0	▲17	50.0
Churchill Caretaker Ministry (Total)	29	2	19	▼17	39.2
Unionist	25	1 (Note: Eric Gandar Dower in Caithness and Sutherland.)	13	▼12	33.8
Liberal National	3	0	5	▼5	4.1
National	1	1 (Note: John Anderson in Combined Scottish Universities.)	0	▲1	1.4
National Labour	0	Dissolved		▼1	—
Ind. Labour Party	3	0	1	▼1	4.1
Independent Liberal	2 (Note: John MacLeod in Ross and Cromarty and Murdoch Macdonald in Inverness.)	Did not stand in 1935		▲2	2.7
Communist	1	0	0	Steady	1.4
Independent Unionist	1 (Note: John Mackie in Galloway.)	Did not stand in 1935		▲1	1.4
Independent	1	1 (Note: John Boyd Orr in Combined Scottish Universities.)	0	▲1	1.4
Liberal	0	0	3	▼3	—
Total	74				

== County and burgh constituency results ==
Below is a table summarising the constituency results of the 1945 general election in Scotland, excluding the result in the Combined Scottish Universities constituency. The seat count and vote share comparisons for the Churchill Caretaker Ministry coalition are compared with the National Government coalition which had effectively dissolved in 1940.

Party	Seats					Aggregate Votes		
Party	Total	Gains	Losses	Net	Of total (%)	Total	Of total (%) (Note: Adjusted for multi-member constituencies.)	Change (%)
Labour	37	17	0	▲17	52.1	1,144,310	47.9	▲11.1
Churchill Caretaker Ministry (Total)	27	1	17	▼16	38.0	964,143	40.3	▼9.5
Unionist	24	1 (Note: Eric Gandar Dower in Caithness and Sutherland.)	12	▼11	33.8	878,206	36.7	▼5.3
Liberal National	3	0	4	▼4	4.2	85,937	3.6	▼3.1
National	0	Did not stand		Steady	—	0	0.0	▼0.2
National Labour	0	Dissolved		▼1	—	0	0.0	▼0.9
Liberal	0	0	3	▼3	—	132,849	5.6	▼1.1
Ind. Labour Party	3	0	1 (Note: George Buchanan re-elected in Glasgow Gorbals but as official Labour candidate.)	▼1	4.2	40,725	1.7	▼3.3
Communist	1	0	0	Steady	1.4	33,265	1.4	▲0.8
SNP	0	0	0	Steady	—	30,595	1.3	▼0.2
Independent Liberal	2 (Note: John MacLeod in Ross and Cromarty and Murdoch Macdonald in Inverness.)	Did not stand in 1935		▲2	2.8	22,151	0.9	—N/a
Independent Unionist	1 (Note: John Mackie in Galloway.)	Did not stand in 1935		▲1	1.4	13,647	0.6	—N/a
Common Wealth	0	New			—	4,231	0.2	New
Protestant Action Society	0	New			—	2,493	0.1	New
Independent	0	Did not stand in 1935			—	951	0.0	—N/a
United Socialist Movement	0	New			—	300	0.0	New
Independent Scottish Nationalist	0	New			—	232	0.0	New
Total	71			0	100.0	2,389,892	100.0	0.0
Registered voters, and turnout						3,343,120 (Note: Electorate in contested constituencies, which was all seats in this election.)	69.0	▼3.6

Popular vote
Labour	47.9%
Unionist	36.7%
Liberal	5.6%
National Liberal	3.6%
Ind. Labour Party	1.7%
Other	4.3%

Parliamentary seats
Labour	50.0%
Unionist	33.8%
National Liberal	4.1%
Ind. Labour Party	4.1%
Ind. Liberal	2.7%
Other	5.4%

== Combined Scottish Universities result ==
The constituency for Combined Scottish Universities returned three Members of Parliament using the single transferable vote electoral system. The electorate consisted of graduates of the university.

Party	Seats				First Preference Votes	
Party	Total	Gains	Losses	Net	Total	Of all (%)
Churchill Caretaker Ministry (Total)	2	1	2	▼1	17,372	53.0
National	1	1 (Note: John Anderson in Combined Scottish Universities.)	0	▲1	16,011	48.8
Unionist	1 (Note: John Graham Kerr in Combined Scottish Universities.)	0	1	▼1	1,361	4.2
Liberal National	0	Did not stand		▼1	0	—N/a
National Labour	0	Dissolved			0	—N/a
Independent	1	1 (Note: John Boyd Orr in Combined Scottish Universities.)	0	▲1	10,685	32.6
Labour	0	0	0	Steady	2,860	8.7
Liberal	0	0	0	Steady	1,872	5.7
Total	3				32,789	

== See also ==
- 1945 United Kingdom general election in England
- 1945 United Kingdom general election in Wales
- 1945 United Kingdom general election in Northern Ireland
- List of MPs for constituencies in Scotland (1945–1950)
