= George Blake (novelist) =

Scottish journalist, literary editor and novelist (1893–1961)

George Blake (1893–1961) was a Scottish journalist, literary editor and novelist. His The Shipbuilders (1935) is considered a significant and influential effort to write about the Scottish industrial working class. "At a time when the idea of myth was current in the Scottish literary world and other writers were forging theirs out of the facts and spirit of rural life, Blake took the iron and grease and the pride of the skilled worker to create one for industrial Scotland." As a literary critic, he wrote a noted work against the Kailyard school of Scottish fiction; and is taken to have formulated a broad-based thesis as cultural critic of the "kailyard" representing the "same ongoing movement in Scottish culture" that leads to "a cheapening, evasive, stereotyped view of Scottish life." He was well known as a BBC radio broadcaster by the 1930s.

== Early life ==
He was born in Greenock, the son of Matthew Blake, machinery manufacturer, and his wife Ursula Scott McCulloch. He was educated at Greenock Academy and Glasgow University. He then trained as a solicitor. During World War I he served in the British Army and was wounded during the Gallipoli Campaign.

After the war Blake worked at the Glasgow Evening News, where Neil Munro was editor from 1918. At this period he had contact with Red Clydeside through his dramatic works, sitting on the council of the Scottish National Players. As a playwright, he came under the influence of Andrew P. Wilson.

== London journalist ==
Blake moved to London where he stayed from 1924 to 1932. There he was an editor of John O'London's Weekly, replacing Sidney Dark as subeditor and writing a number of columns, to 1928; and then edited the Strand Magazine.

== The Porpoise Press and Faber & Faber ==
The Porpoise Press, in existence from 1922 to 1939, was founded in Edinburgh by Roderick Watson Kerr and George Malcolm Thomson. Blake had contact with Thomson from 1923, when the Press published his one-act play The Mother. Thomson's 1927 book Caledonia broached the "condition of Scotland" question that preoccupied Blake and other Scottish intellectuals into the 1930s.

Late in 1929, Blake was introduced to Geoffrey Faber, by Frank Vigor Morley. He became in 1930 a director of Faber & Faber, playing a role in the Porpoise Press: Faber & Faber effectively took it over, through interest in Scottish national literature. Morning Tide (1931), a novel by Neil Gunn, was an immediate commercial success for the Press.

At this point Thomson and Blake were aligned in nationalist politics. Thomson's 1931 pamphlet The Kingdom of Scotland Restored, advocating a form of Scottish home rule, had Blake's approval, and the Introduction was signed by Blake, Andrew Dewar Gibb, Moray McLaren and William Power. By that year, Blake had joined the National Party of Scotland (NPS). Gunn became involved in the efforts, which succeeded, to merge the NPS, of the left, with the conservative Scottish Party; on Thomson's account, Blake encouraged Gunn to do so.

Returning to Scotland in 1932, Blake worked for the Porpoise Press, which in 1934 published William Power's My Scotland. Both Gibb and Power later became leaders of the merged Scottish National Party.

Blake and Thomson then fell out, with Thomson resigning from the Press in 1933. It published his Scotland That Distressed Area in 1935. Blake's The Shipbuilders was published the same year, by Faber & Faber. They differed in method: Thomson offered partisan polemics, Blake a journalist's realism expressed as a novel.

== Later life ==
Blake lived at The Glenan, Helensburgh and elsewhere. He was a radio broadcaster and literary journalist; and was visited by T. S. Eliot. He had a regular position on This Week in Scotland, BBC Scottish Region Radio. This was despite some reservations on the part of Andrew Stewart, Scottish Programme Director, who thought Blake's nationalist views were too overt, and would have preferred Eric Linklater.

Blake died in Glasgow's Southern General Hospital on 29 August 1961, survived by his wife Eliza Malcolm Lawson (Ellie), whom he had married in 1923.

== Works ==
=== Fiction ===
Blake's novels have been described as "resolutely realistic, serious, socialistic, and nationalistic". Their social realism included addressing industrialisation and urban poverty, topics neglected in Scottish literature until the 1920s and 1930s. He wrote a number of "Glasgow novels", as well as other fiction. Hugh Macdiarmid discussed in 1926 a "new Glasgow school" of novelists, listing figures of whom only Catherine Carswell attained the same sort of stature as Blake.

- Mince Collop Close (1923)
- The Wild Men (1925))
- Young Malcolm (1926))
- Paper Money (1928), US title Gettin' in Society
- The Path of Glory (1929), about the Gallipoli campaign, in the "soldier's tale" genre.
- The Seas Between (1930)
- Returned Empty (1931)
- Sea Tangle (1932)
- The Shipbuilders (1935), subsequently a film The Shipbuilders from 1943. The film has been described as a more authentic representation of working-class Glasgow. James Kelman took the novel's third-person narrative as exemplary of narrative laden with a value system.
- David and Joanna (1936)
- Down to the Sea (1937), autobiographical
- "Garvel" novel series; these five popular works about the Oliphant family had a television adaptation. After Late Harvest (1938) came The Valiant Heart (1940), The Constant Star (1945), The Westering Sun (1946), The Paying Guest (1949), and The Voyage Home (1952).
- The Five Arches (1948)
- The Piper's Tune (1950), Clydeside
- The Innocence Within (1955)
- The Peacock Palace (1958)
- The Loves of Mary Glen (1960)

=== Films ===
- World of Steel (1938), documentary, short.
- The River Clyde: A Survey of Scotland's Greatest River (1939), documentary, short.
- Floodtide (1949) was a feature film with a screenplay involving Blake.

=== Drama ===
- The Mother (1921), produced 13 April 1921 with Elliot Cranston Mason as Morag Gillespie.
- Fledglings, performed 1922 by the Scottish National Players.
- Clyde Built (1922)
- The Weaker Vessel (1923)

=== Non-fiction and essays ===
In later life, Blake wrote factually about Clydeside, shipbuilders and shipping lines. "Blake's thesis essentially is that the history of the Clyde is a glorious tale of great ships, born out of traditions of craftsmanship and mechanical genius unrivalled anywhere in the world."

- Vagabond Papers (1922)
- The Coasts of Normandy (1929)
- The Press and the Public (1930)
- The Heart of Scotland (1934) and later editions. In the 1951 edition Blake drew attention to industrial Central Belt locations as an antidote to received views of Scottish life. He encouraged a realism in relation to Scottish life, but stopping short of the reportage of sectarianism and slums.
- Rest and Be Thankful (1934)
- R.M.S. Queen Mary (1936)
- British Ships and Shipbuilders (1946)
- Scottish Enterprise and Shipbuilding (1947)
- Mountain and Flood: The history of the 52nd Lowland Division 1939–1946 (1950)
- The Trials of Patrick Carraher (1951)
- Barrie and the Kailyard School (1951); as a critic, Blake was dismissive of J. M. Barrie in "literal and naturalistic terms".
- The Firth of Clyde (1952)
- Annals of Scotland 1895–1955: An essay on the twentieth-century Scottish novel (1956)
- The Ben Line (1956): an official history of the Ben Line
- Clyde Lighthouses (1956)
- B.I. Centenary, 1856–1956: The Story of the British India Steam Navigation Co. (1956): an official history of the British India Steam Navigation Company.
- Lloyd's Register of Shipping 1760–1960 (1960)
- Gellarly's 1862–1962 (1962)
- The Gourock (1963), on The Gourock Ropeworks Co.
