= C. E. M. Joad =

English philosopher (1891–1953)

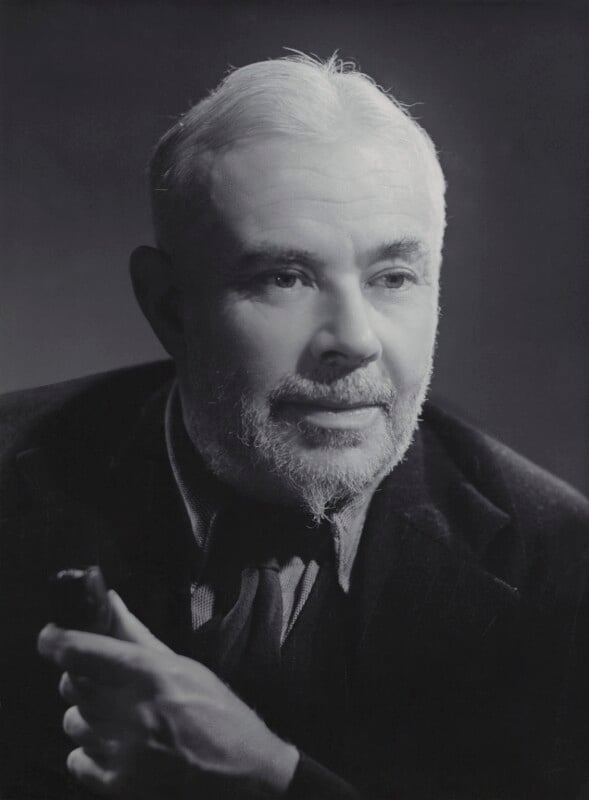
- Joad in 1944
- Born: Cyril Edwin Mitchinson Joad; 12 August 1891; Durham, England
- Died: 9 April 1953 (aged 61); Hampstead, England

Education
- Education: Balliol College, Oxford

Philosophical work
- Era: Contemporary philosophy
- Region: Western philosophy
- School: Pacifism
- Institutions: Birkbeck College, University of London

Cyril Edwin Mitchinson Joad (/dʒoʊd/; 12 August 1891 – 9 April 1953) was an English philosopher, author, teacher and broadcasting personality. He appeared on The Brains Trust, a BBC Radio wartime discussion programme. He popularised philosophy and became a celebrity, before his downfall in a scandal over an unpaid train fare in 1948.

== Early life ==
Joad was born in Durham, the only son of Edwin and Mary Joad (née Smith). In 1892 his father became an Inspector of Schools and the family moved to Southampton, where he received a very strict Christian upbringing. Joad started school at the age of five in 1896, attending Oxford Preparatory School (later called the Dragon School) until 1906, and then Blundell's School, Tiverton, Devon, until 1910.

=== Balliol College ===
In 1910 Joad went up to Balliol College, Oxford. Here he developed his skills as a philosopher and debater. By 1912 he was a first class sportsman and Oxford Union debater. He also became a Syndicalist, a Guild Socialist, and then a Fabian. In 1913 he heard about George Bernard Shaw through the newly founded magazine the New Statesman. This developed his study of philosophy, one of the building blocks for his career as a teacher and broadcaster. After completing his course at Balliol, achieving a first in Honour Moderations in Literae Humaniores (1912), a first in Greats (a combination of philosophy and ancient history, 1914) and John Locke scholarship in mental philosophy (1914), Joad entered the civil service.

== Civil service ==
Joad began at the Board of Trade in 1914 after attending a Fabian Summer School. His aim was to infuse the civil service with a socialist ethos. Joad socialised with other Fabians like Agnes Harben and her husband, and was quoted on the experience of meeting suffragettes recovering from hunger strike mixing with the 'county set'. He worked in the Labour Exchanges Department of the Board of Trade, the department becoming the new Ministry of Labour in 1916. In the months leading up to the First World War he displayed "ardent" pacifism, which resulted in political controversy. Joad, along with George Bernard Shaw and Bertrand Russell, became unpopular with many who were trying to encourage men to enlist as soldiers to fight for their country.

== Marriage ==
In May 1915 Joad married Mary White, and they bought a home in Westhumble, near Dorking, in Surrey. The village, formerly home to Fanny Burney, was near to the founder of the Fabian Society, Beatrice Webb. Joad evaded conscription by fleeing to Snowdonia, Wales. After the birth of three children, Joad's marriage ended in separation in 1921. Joad later said that his separation had caused him to abandon his feminism and instead adopt a belief in the "inferior mind" of women.

== Life after separation ==
After the separation Joad moved to Hampstead in London with a student teacher, Marjorie Thomson. She was the first of many mistresses, all of whom were introduced as 'Mrs Joad'. He described sexual desire as "a buzzing bluebottle that needed to be swatted promptly before it distracted a man of intellect from higher things." He believed that female minds lacked objectivity, and he had no interest in women without sexual congress. Joad was "short and rotund, with bright little eyes, round, rosy cheeks, and a stiff, bristly beard."

Job interviews proved a great difficulty for Joad, due to his flippancy. In 1930, he left the civil service to become Head of the Department of Philosophy and Psychology at Birkbeck College, University of London. The department was small and he made full use of his great teaching skills. He popularised philosophy, and many other philosophers were beginning to take him seriously. With his two books, Guide to Modern Thought (1933) and Guide to Philosophy (1936), he became a well-known figure.

== 1930s–1940s ==
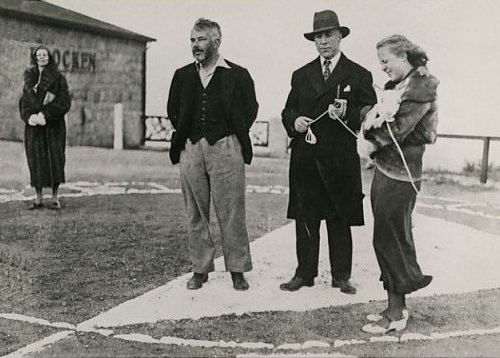
Joad with his hands behind his back on the Brocken in June 1932

In his early life Joad very much shared the desire for the destruction of the capitalist system. He was expelled from the Fabian Society in 1925 because of sexual misbehaviour at its summer school, and did not rejoin until 1943. In 1931, disenchanted with Labour in office, Joad became Director of Propaganda for the New Party. Owing to the rise of Oswald Mosley's pro-Fascist sympathies, Joad resigned, along with John Strachey. Soon afterwards he became bitterly opposed to Nazism, but he continued to oppose militarism and gave his support to pacifist organisations, including the No More War Movement and the Peace Pledge Union.

While at Birkbeck College Joad played a leading role in The King and Country debate. The motion, devised by David Graham and debated on Thursday 9 February 1933, was "that this House will in no circumstances fight for its King and Country." The debate was often interpreted as illustrating both the attitude of Oxford undergraduates and the state of Europe at the time; Adolf Hitler had become Chancellor of Germany just ten days prior to the debate. Joad was the principal speaker in favour of the proposition, which passed by a vote of 275 to 153. Joad's speech was described as "well-organized and well-received, and probably the single most important reason for the outcome of the debate." Joad's part in the debate caused him to gain a public reputation as an absolute pacifist. Joad was also involved in the National Peace Council, which he chaired, 1937–38.

Joad was an outspoken controversialist; he declared his main intellectual influences were George Bernard Shaw and H. G. Wells. He was strongly critical of contemporary philosophical trends such as Marxism, Behaviorism and Psychoanalysis. He was also repeatedly referred to as "the Mencken of England", although, as Kunitz and Haycraft pointed out, Joad and Mencken "would be at sword's point on most issues". On aesthetics he was incurably platonic: on listening to the "lowering effect" of Debussy's music, he felt his "vitality and zest for life draining away"; jazz and swing music are "sounds which do not strictly belong to the class of music at all"; Dylan Thomas's "A Refusal to Mourn the Death, by Fire, of a Child in London" was partly "meaningless... some of the allusions baffle the intellect"; symbolism in art is "often used as a device... for disguising the fact that there is nothing to communicate", citing Denton Welch's "Narcissus Bay" as an example; and in her "persistent refusal to grade, to give moral marks or to assign values", he found Virginia Woolf's work leaving him feeling that "nothing seems to be very much worth while".

Joad's autobiography, Under the Fifth Rib, included "The dominating interest of my University career, an interest which has largely shaped my subsequent outlook on life, was Socialism. And my Socialism was by no means the mere undergraduate pose which what I have said hitherto may have suggested. Admittedly I and my Socialist contemporaries talked a good deal of inflated nonsense; admittedly we played with theories as a child plays with toys from sheer intellectual exuberance. But we also did a considerable amount of hard thinking."

Joad crusaded to preserve the English countryside against industrial exploitation, ribbon development, overhead cables and destructive tourism. He wrote letters and articles in protest against decisions being made to increase Britain's wealth and status, as he believed the short term status would bring long-term problems. He organised rambles and rode recklessly through the countryside. Joad was also associated with the fledgling naturist movement in England. He also had a passion for hunting.

Hating the idea of nothing to do, Joad organised on average nine lectures per week and two books per year. His popularity soared and he was invited to give many lectures and lead discussions. He also involved himself in sporting activities such as tennis and hockey, and recreational activities such as bridge, chess and the player piano. He was a great conversationalist, and enjoyed entertaining distinguished members of society.

After the outbreak of the Second World War he became disgusted at the lack of liberty being shown (he was a founding vice-president of the National Council for Civil Liberties from 1934). He went as far as to beg the Ministry of Information to make use of him. In January 1940 Joad was selected for a BBC Home Service wartime discussion programme, The Brains Trust, which was an immediate success, attracting millions of listeners. Shortly afterwards Joad abandoned his pacifism and placed his support behind the British war effort. Although Joad never reverted to pacifism, he actively supported at least one conscientious objector during the war, leading to a pamphlet, The Present Position of Conscientious Objection, published by the Central Board for Conscientious Objectors, 1944. Joad also opposed the continuation of conscription into peacetime, writing the pamphlet The Rational Approach to Conscription, published by the No Conscription Council, 1947.

== Psychical research ==
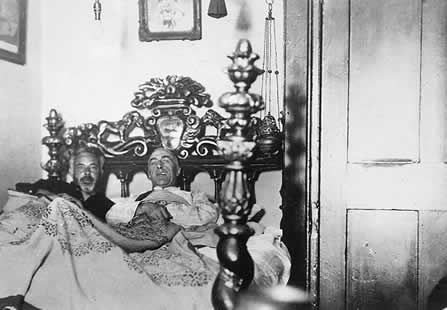
Joad with the psychic researcher Harry Price in an allegedly haunted bed

Joad was interested in the paranormal, and partnered with Harry Price on a number of ghost-hunting expeditions, also joining the Ghost Club, of which Price became the president. He involved himself in psychical research, travelling to the Harz Mountains to help Price to test whether the 'Bloksberg Tryst' would turn a male goat into a handsome prince at the behest of a maiden pure in heart; it did not. In 1934 he became Chairman of the University of London Council for Psychical Investigation, an unofficial committee formed by Price as a successor body to his National Laboratory of Psychical Research. In 1939, Joad's publications on psychical research were severely criticised in the Proceedings of the Society for Psychical Research. It was discovered that Joad was not present at séances he had claimed to have attended. Price later suspended the operations of the council.

Joad opposed the spiritualist hypothesis of mediumship. He debated the psychical researcher Shaw Desmond on spiritualism. He argued against immortality and spirit communication, preferring his "mindlet" hypothesis which held that bundle of ideas which were formerly regarded as the mind of the dead person may survive death for a temporal period of time. During the later years of his life he published articles on how extrasensory perception may fit into a Christian framework.

== The Brains Trust ==
Joad's prominence came from The Brains Trust, which featured a small group including Commander A. B. Campbell and Julian Huxley. His developed and matured discussion techniques, his fund of anecdotes and mild humour brought him to the attention of the general public.

The programme came to deal with difficult questions posed by listeners, and the panellists would discuss the question in great detail, and render a philosophical opinion. Examples of the questions ranged from "What is the meaning of life?" to "How can a fly land upside-down on the ceiling?" Joad became a star of the show, his voice being the most heard on radio except for the news. Joad nearly always opened with the catchphrase "It all depends on what you mean by…" when responding to a question. Although there was opposition from Conservatives, who complained about political bias, the general public considered him the greatest British philosopher of the day and celebrity status followed.

== Rise and fall ==
As Joad had become so well known, he was invited to give after-dinner speeches, open bazaars, even advertise tea, and his book sales soared. He stood as a Labour candidate at a by-election in November 1946 for the Combined Scottish Universities constituency but lost.

Joad once boasted in print, "I cheat the railway company whenever I can." On 12 April 1948 Joad was caught travelling on a Waterloo to Exeter train without a valid ticket. When he failed to give a satisfactory explanation, he was convicted of fare dodging and fined £2 (equivalent to £63 in 2025). This made front-page headlines in the national newspapers, destroyed his hopes of a peerage and resulted in his dismissal from the BBC. The humiliation of this had a severe effect on Joad's health, and he soon became confined to bed at his home in Hampstead. Joad renounced his agnosticism and returned to the Christianity of the Church of England, which he detailed in his book The Recovery of Belief, published in 1952.

== Death ==
After the bed-confining thrombosis following his dismissal from the BBC in 1948, Joad developed terminal cancer. He died on 9 April 1953 at his home, 4 East Heath Road, Hampstead, aged 61, and was buried at Saint John's-at-Hampstead Church in London.

== Legacy ==
Joad was one of the best known British intellectuals of his time, as well known as George Bernard Shaw and Bertrand Russell in his lifetime. He popularised philosophy, both in his books and by the spoken word. In spite of this, he was loathed by most academic philosophers, including Russell. Cambridge philosopher Ludwig Wittgenstein once said, in a meeting where Joad had delivered a paper criticising the form of analytical philosophy popular at Cambridge, that "naturally a slum landlord would object to slum clearance".

Quotes from Joad appear in Virginia Woolf's monograph Three Guineas. For example:

"If it is, then the sooner they give up the pretence of playing with public affairs and return to private life the better. If they cannot make a job of the House of Commons, let them at least make something of their own houses. If they cannot learn to save men from the destruction which incurable male mischievousness bids fair to bring upon them, let women at least learn to feed them, before they destroy themselves."

Joad was invited to appear at the Socratic Club, an undergraduate society at Oxford University, where he spoke on 24 January 1944, on the subject "On Being Reviewed by Christians", an event attended by more than 250 students. This was a stepping-stone in Joad's life, particularly at a time when he was re-examining his convictions. This re-examination eventually led to his return to the Christian faith of his youth, an event he mentioned in The Recovery of Belief. C. S. Lewis, President of the Socratic Club, is mentioned twice in this book, once as an influence on Joad through Lewis' book The Abolition of Man. Part of his legacy, then, was to return to the faith that he had set aside as an Oxford undergraduate and to defend that faith in his writings.

Joad is also mentioned in Stephen Potter's book Gamesmanship, as his partner in a tennis match in which the two men were up against two younger and fitter players who were outplaying them fairly comfortably, until Joad asked his opponent whether a ball that had clearly landed way behind the line was in or out; an event which Potter says made him start thinking about the concept of gamesmanship.

== Selected publications ==
Joad wrote, introduced or edited over 100 books, pamphlets, articles and essays including the following.

=== Books ===
- Robert Owen, Idealist, London : Fabian Society [Fabian Tracts, No. 182][Fabian Biographical Series, No. 7] (1917)
- The Diary of a Dead Officer, Being the Posthumous papers of A.G. West, ed. with intro, London : George Allen & Unwin (1918)
- Essays in Common-Sense Philosophy, London : George Allen & Unwin (1919, 2nd ed., 1933)
- Samuel Butler, 1835-1902, London: L. Parsons;, Small, Maynard and Company [Roadmaker Series] (1924); reprinted: Freeport, NY, Books for Libraries Press [Select Bibliographies Reprint Series] (1969)
- Common Sense Ethics, London : Methuen (1921)
- Common Sense Theology, London : T. Fisher Unwin (1922)
- The Highbrows, A Novel, London : Jonathan Cape [Novels of To-day] (1922)
- Diogenes, The Future of Leisure, London : Kegan, Paul, Trench, Trubner (To-day and To-morrow) (1928)
- Introduction to Modern Political Theory, Oxford : The Clarendon Press [The World's Manuals] (1924)
- Priscilla and Charybdis, and Other Stories, London : Herbert Jenkins (1924)
- Samuel Butler (1835–1902), London : Leonard Parsons and Boston: Small, Maynard and Company [Roadmaker Series] (1924)
- The Mind and Its Place in Nature, London : Kegan Paul, Trench, Tubner and Co., Ltd. (1925)
- Mind and Matter : The Philosophical Introduction to Modern Science, London : Oxford University Press: Humphrey Milford (1925); reprinted London : Unwin Books (1963)
- After-Dinner Philosophy, London : George Routledge & Sons (1926). Joint author: John Strachey.
- The Babbitt Warren, London : Kegan Paul, Trench, Trubner & Co. (1926) - a satire on the United States
- The Bookmark, London : The Labour Publishing Company (1926); repr. London : Westhouse (1945)
- Thrasymachus, The Future of Morals, London : Kegan, Paul, Trench, Trubner (1928); rev. ed., London : Kegan Paul (To-day and To-morrow) (1936); republished as The Future of Morals, London: John Westhouse (1946)
- The Future of Life : A Theory of Vitalism, New York : G.P. Putnam's Sons (1928)
- The Meaning of Life As Shown in the Process of Evolution, London : Watts & Co. [Forum Series] (1928)
- Great Philosophies of the World, London : Ernest Benn [Benn's Sixpenny Library] (1928); repr. & rev., London : Thomas Nelson [The Nelson Classics] (1937)
- Matter, Life and Value, London : Oxford University Press (1929)
- The Present and Future of Religion, London : Ernest Benn (1930); reprinted: Westport, Conn.: Greenwood Press (1974)
- Unorthodox Dialogues on Education and Art, London : Ernest Benn (1930)
- The Case for the New Party, London : New Party [New Party Broadcasts] (c. 1931)
- The Story of Civilization, London : A. & C. Black [How-&-Why Series] (1931; 2nd ed., 1936)
- The Horrors of the Countryside, London: The Hogarth Press [Day to Day Pamphlets, No. 3] (1931)
- What Fighting Means, London : No More War Movement (ca. 1932)
- Philosophical Aspects of Modern Science, London : George Allen & Unwin (1932); repr. London : George Allen & Unwin (1963)
- Under the Fifth Rib : A Belligerent Autobiography, London : Faber & Faber (1932), retitled The Book of Joad (1935)
- Guide to Modern Thought, London : Faber & Faber (1933); rev. & enlarged, London : Pan (1948)
- Counter Attack from the East : The Philosophy of Radhakrishnan, London : George Allen & Unwin (1933)
- Is Christianity True? A Discussion between Arnold Lunn and C.E.M. Joad, London: Eyre & Spottiswoode (1933)
- Insecurity in Arms, London : National Peace Council, No. 8, rev. (1934)
- Liberty Today, London : Watts & Co. [The Thinker's Library] (1934); rev. ed. (1938)
- Manifesto : Being the Book of the Federation of Progressive Societies and Individuals, ed., London : George Allen & Unwin (1934)
- Return to Philosophy: Being a Defense of Reason, an Affirmation of Values and a Plea for Philosophy, London : Faber & Faber (1935)
- Science and Human Freedom: The Seventh Annual Haldane Memorial Lecture, London : Birkbeck College, University of London, (1935)
- Guide to Philosophy, London : Victor Gollancz (1936); reprinted New York : Dover Publications (1957)
- The Dictator Resigns, London : Methuen (1936)
- The Story of Indian Civilisation, London : Macmillan (1936)
- "Defence" is No Defence, London : National Peace Council (1937)
- The Testament of Joad, London : Faber & Faber [The Faber Library] (1937)
- Guide to the Philosophy of Morals and Politics (1938)
- Guide to Modern Wickedness, London: Faber & Faber (1939)
- How to Write, Think and Speak Correctly, ed., London : Odhams (1939)
- Why War?, Harmondsworth : Penguin [Penguin Specials] (1939)
- For Civilization, London : Macmillan [Macmillan War Pamphlets] (1940)
- Journey Through the War Mind, London : Faber & Faber (1940; 2nd ed. 1942)
- Philosophy For Our Times, London : Thomas Nelson & Sons (1940)
- The Philosophy of Federal Union, London : Macmillan (1941)
- What Is at Stake, and Why Not Say So?, London : Victor Gollancz [Victory Books, 8] (1941)
- An Old Countryside for New People, London and Letchworth : J. M. Dent & Sons [Design for Britain series] (1942)
- God and Evil, London : Faber & Faber (1942)
- Pieces of Mind, London : Faber & Faber (1942)
- The Adventures of the Young Soldier in Search of the Better World... With drawings by Mervyn Peake, London : Faber & Faber (1943).
- Philosophy, London : English Universities Press [Teach Yourself Books] (1944)
- The Present Position of Conscientious Objection, London : Central Board for Conscientious Objectors (May 1944)
- About Education, London : Faber & Faber (1945)
- Opinions, London : Westhouse (1945)
- Introduction To Modern Philosophy, Oxford : Clarendon Press (1946)
- Conditions of Survival, London : Federal Union (1946)
- How Our Minds Work, London : Westhouse (1946)
- The Untutored Townsman's Invasion of the Country, London : Faber & Faber (1946)
- The Rational Approach to Conscription, London : No Conscription Council [Pamphlet Series, No. 7] (1947)
- Decadence : A Philosophical Inquiry, London: Faber & Faber (1948)
- A Year More or Less, London : Victor Gollancz (1948)
- An Introduction To Contemporary Knowledge, London : E. J. Arnold (1948)
- The English Counties, Illustrated, London : Odhams (1948; new ed., 1957)
- Shaw : His Influence upon English Life and Thought, London : Victor Gollancz (1949)
- The Principles of Parliamentary Democracy, London : Falcon Press [Forum Books] (1949)
- A Critique of Logical Positivism, London : Gollancz (1950); Chicago : University of Chicago Press (1950)
- The Pleasure of Being Oneself, London : George Weidenfeld & Nicolson (1951); Freeport, NY : Books for Libraries Press [Essay Index Reprint Series] (1970)
- A First Encounter with Philosophy : An Introduction Especially Designed for Young Men and Women, London : James Blackwood (1952; 1953)
- The Recovery of Belief : A Restatement of Christian Philosophy London: Faber & Faber (1952)
- Shaw and Society : An Anthology and a Symposium, ed., London : Odhams (1953)
- Folly Farm [posthumous], London : Faber & Faber (1954)

=== Articles and essays ===
- "Monism in the Light of Recent Developments in Philosophy", in: Proceedings of the Aristotelian Society, N.S. 17 (1916–17)
- "The Idea of Public Right", in: The Idea of Public Right, Being the First Four Prize Essays in Each of the Three Divisions of The Nation Essay Competition. With an introd. by H.H. Asquith", London : George Allen & Unwin (1918), pp. 95–140
- "A Realist Philosophy of Life", in: Contemporary British Philosophy, Second Series, ed. J.H. Muirhead, London : George Allen & Unwin [Muirhead Library of Philosophy] (1925)
- "Philosophy and Aldous Huxley", in: The Realist, 1: 4 (1929)
- "The Advocacy of Peace", in: The Twentieth Century, Vol. 5, No. 39, (July 1933)
- "The End of an Epoch", in: New Statesman & Nation, London (8 December 1934)
- "The Challenge to Reason", in: The Rationalist Annual, London : The Rationalist Press (1935)
- "The Return of Dogma", in: The Rationalist Annual, London : The Rationalist Press (1936)
- "On Pain, Death, and the Goodness of God", in: The Rationalist Annual, London : The Rationalist Press (1937)
- "On Useless Education", in: The Rationalist Annual, London : The Rationalist Press (1939)
- "Principles of Peace", in: The Spectator, London (16 August 1940; repr. Articles of War : The Spectator Book of World War II, ed. F. Glass & P. Marsden-Smedley, London : Paladin Grafton Books, 1989, 119–22)
- "The Face of England", in: Horizon, V, London (29 May 1942)
- "Man's Superiority to the Beasts : Liberty Versus Security in the Modern State", in: Freedom of Expression, ed. H. Ould, London : Hutchinson International Authors Ltd. (1944)
- "Walking in the Country", in: England is a Garden : Not a Garden City, John Betjeman, ed., London: Countrygoer Books [Countrygoer Books] (1944)
- "On Thirty Years of Going to the Lakes", in: Countrygoer Book, ed. C. Moore, London : Countrygoer Books (1944)
- "The Virtue of Examinations", in: New Statesman & Nation, London (11 March 1944; reply to objections, 25 March)
- "Fewer and Better" [Population], in: London Forum, I : 1, London (1946)
- "On No Longer Being A Rationalist", in: The Rationalist Annual, London : C.A. Watts & Co. (1946)
- "Introduction", in: J.C. Flugel, Population, Psychology, and Peace, London : Watts & Co. [The Thinker's Library] (1947)
- "Foreword", in: Clare & Marshall Brown, Fell Walking from Wasdale, London : The Saint Catherine Press (1948)
- "Turning-Points", in: The Saturday Book, ed. L. Russell, London : Hutchinson (1948)
