= George Malcolm Thomson (journalist) =

Scottish publicist (1899–1966)

George Malcolm Thomson OBE (1899–1996) was a Scottish journalist and publicist for Scottish nationalism. He is now best known for the sectarian slant he adopted the 1930s, aimed at Irish-Scots, and as an activist working on behalf of the Scottish Party. His biographer George McKechnie wrote "His modern Scottish reputation is grounded almost exclusively on his obsessive campaigns against Irish Catholics."

== Life ==
He was born in Leith on 2 August 1899 into a Presbyterian family, the eldest son of the journalist Charles Thomson and his wife Mary. His parents belonged to the United Free Church. He attended Daniel Stewart's College from age 10, and was a student at Edinburgh University from 1919 to 1922. In his final university year, he founded with another undergraduate, Roderick Watson Kerr, the Porpoise Press.

Kerr in 1922 went to work on The Scotsman, and in 1926 moved to the Liverpool Daily Post. The same year, following his marriage, Thomson moved to London to work as a journalist, and write books. His early books attracted the attention of Lord Beaverbrook, and he joined Beaverbrook Newspapers in 1931. He acted as Principal Private Secretary to Beaverbrook, who was in government during World War II.

In 1990 Thomson was awarded an OBE for services to journalism. He died in June 1996, in Hampstead.

== Scottish nationalist ==
Caledonia (1927) had dwelt on Irish immigration to Scotland, as did Andrew Dewar Gibb's Scotland in Eclipse (1930), with the connected theme of slum housing in Glasgow. The two authors described a perceived threat in the influence of the Roman Catholic Church. At this time, the newly-joined United Free Church and Church of Scotland were leading a campaign against Irish-Scots Catholics, now seen as racist. Gibb and Thomson repeatedly denounced the same group. Their position has been described as a "strident, racially oriented nationalism which was politically to the far right and had quasi-fascist tendencies." The context, identified by Stewart J. Brown, was the "exclusivist racial nationalism" of Presbyterians, dating from the early 1920s and their distancing from the UK Labour Party, and associated with the Church union in Scotland.

In terms of party politics, the National Party of Scotland, of the left, was first countered by the Scottish Party set up in 1932, of the right, by Gibb and James Graham, 6th Duke of Montrose, with others. Then with the mediation of Thomson and Neil Gunn, the two parties merged in 1934, to form the Scottish National Party, with the exclusion of some radical nationalists. Electorally the Scottish Protestant League peaked in Glasgow local government in 1933. Fascist ideology made no further advances in Scotland. Gibb and Thomson went on to found the Saltire Society, concerned with Scottish culture and heritage, in 1936.

For Thomson, 1935 and the publication of his book Scotland: That Distressed Area marked the end of his involvement in Scottish politics that had been pursued covertly. Lord Beaverbrook as his employer required him to sign an agreement that he would cease these activities.

== Works ==
- Caledonia: or the Future of the Scots (1927), in the To-day and To-morrow series. It provoked a reply, Albyn: or Scotland and the Future (1927) by C. M. Grieve. Both works met with criticism from the historians Robert Rait and George Smith Pryde (1899–1961).
- The Re-Discovery of Scotland (1928)
- Whisky (Porpoise Press, 1930), as Aeneas MacDonald, one of the Seven Men of Moidart
- Can the Scottish Church Survive? (1930), pamphlet
- The Kingdom of Scotland Restored, undated pamphlet of 1930/1
- Scotland: That Distressed Area (1935)
- The Twelve Days: 24 July to 4 August 1914 (1964)
- The Robbers Passing By (1966)
- The Crime of Mary Stuart (1967)
- Vote of Censure (1968)
- Sir Francis Drake (1972)
- Lord Castlerosse: His Life and Times (1973)
- The Prime Ministers: From Robert Walpole to Margaret Thatcher (1980)
- The First Churchill: The Life of John, 1st Duke of Marlborough (1979)
- A Kind of Justice: two studies in treason (1970)
- The North-West Passage (1975)
- Warrior Prince: Prince Rupert of the Rhine (1975)
- The Ball at Glenkerran (1982)

His play Moonlight Flitting was produced at London's Whitehall Theatre in 1938.

== Family ==
Thomson married in 1926, in Oslo, Else Ellefsen (died 1957), whose portrait had been painted by Eric Robertson (1887–1941) of the Edinburgh Group. She translated (1923) The Plague in Bergamo by Jens Peter Jacobsen for the Porpoise Press.
