= David Cleghorn Thomson =

Thomson in 1935

David Cleghorn Thomson (9 October 1900 – 23 April 1980), was a Scottish journalist, author, poet, playwright, and Liberal and Labour Party politician. He was notably Director of the BBC's Scottish Region.

== Background and education ==
Thomson was born in Edinburgh, the son of Dr. John Thomson FRCPE and his wife, Isobel Macphail. The family lived at 14 Coates Crescent in Edinburgh's fashionable West End.

He graduated with an MA degree from the University of Edinburgh. During his time there he had served on the Students' Representative Council and was on the editorial committee of the student newspaper, The Student.

At Balliol College, Oxford, he was a student of the composer Dr. Ernest Walker. In 1923 he edited Oxford Poetry, a literary magazine. He was awarded a second class B.A. (Hons.) in history and was the Senior Domus Exhibitioner in history.

== Professional career ==
After graduating, Thomson moved to London and received a legal training at the Inner Temple, and was duly installed in the chambers of D.N. Pritt, K.C., reading for the English Bar.

He then became a trainee journalist on the Oxford Chronicle and at the English Review as well as gaining freelance experience with The Sunday Times, London Mercury, Daily Express and Daily Record.

=== At the BBC ===
Thomson joined the BBC's publicity department as an assistant in April 1925. Initially, he worked in the literary section, where he wrote articles for the Radio Times. At the end of his probationary period he became one of the magazine's two sub-editors. After the BBC took direct editorial control of the Radio Times in February 1926, he briefly became its assistant editor and musical editor.

In March 2026, he was transferred to Glasgow as Scottish Liaison Officer, charged with assisting in "the development of the scope and influence of broadcasting in Scotland and Ulster". In October, he was promoted to the new position of Northern Area Director, in charge of Scotland and Northern Ireland. From February 1927, he took on the additional role of interim Glasgow station director until, in July, his deputy, Henry Fitch, was appointed permanent station director.

In November 1928, Thomson became the BBC's Scottish Regional Director, and in 1930 oversaw the return of its Scottish headquarters from Glasgow to premises at 5 Queen Street, Edinburgh. In the early 1930s, he instituted a number of popular radio programmes under series titles such as Frae a' the Airts, What's Intil't and What's Wrong with Scotland?. The close alignment of these programmes with the agenda being promoted by the literary and cultural movement known as the Scottish Renaissance created tension with his superiors over Corporation policy in Scotland and ultimately led to his resignation in 1933.

=== Public life ===
In 1927, Thomson was elected to the executive committee of the Scottish National Theatre Society: he was convener of the publicity & propaganda committee; when it became a limited company in February 1928 he became, in turn, a member of the first board of directors.

In 1931 Thomson was elected a Fellow of the Royal Society of Edinburgh. His proposers were Francis Albert Eley Crew, Robert Kerr Hannay, Sir James Walker and John (Ian) Bartholomew. He later resigned from the Society.

In 1932, he edited a book of essays titled Scotland in Quest of Her Youth, which included contributions from a number of figures associated with the Scottish Renaissance.

== Political career ==
At the age of just 23, Thomson was Liberal candidate for the Willesden West division of Middlesex at the 1923 General Election. This was not a promising seat for a Liberal; no candidate had stood in 1922 and in 1918 the Liberal came third with less than 9%. Thomson was to also come third, but polled 18%. He returned to his native Edinburgh and was Liberal candidate for the Edinburgh South division at the 1924 General Election. At this election he was reputedly the Liberal Party's youngest candidate in Scotland. Edinburgh South was a Unionist seat that they had gained from the Liberals in 1918. In 1923 his predecessor as Liberal candidate had come within 2,500 votes of winning. This was a seat where the Labour Party had never run a candidate before, and they did not put up a candidate against Thomson. During the campaign, he expressed support for Scottish Home Rule, saying that 'he believed Scotland should have a Parliament of some sort in which to discuss matters purely concerning herself, but he was not in favour of the repeal of the Union'. With the national tide running against the Liberals, Thomson was well beaten and was only able to poll 36% of the vote.

Between 1918 and 1922 the Liberal Party had been split between those who supported the Coalition Government led by David Lloyd George and those who went into opposition, led by H. H. Asquith. The Liberals had re-united for the 1923 and 1924 elections. At the 1924 election, Asquith lost his seat but remained party leader. Lloyd George became Chairman of the Parliamentary Party. A section of the party who remained anti-Lloyd George formed themselves into a 'Radical Group' (sic) and Thomson was the group's first secretary. Despite his defeat in 1924, Thomson was sufficiently motivated to remain prospective Liberal candidate for Edinburgh South. However he resigned this position in 1926 when he became a Director at the BBC. His job at the BBC restricted his involvement in politics, so he did not contest the general elections of 1929 and 1931.

After he left the BBC, he returned to political activity, but this time with the Labour Party. He was Labour candidate for the Leith division of Edinburgh at the 1935 General Election. Leith had been a safe Liberal seat and the sitting member was a supporter of the National Government. Thomson was unable to gain the seat, though he did reduce the majority. He was then Labour candidate for the 1936 Combined Scottish Universities by-election. His National Government opponent on this occasion was former Labour Prime Minister Ramsay MacDonald. Labour candidates had always polled poorly in this University seat and Thomson was no different; he came third with only 12% of the vote. He was prospective Labour candidate for the West Renfrewshire division for the general election expected to take place in 1939/40. This had been a Labour seat until 1931 so his prospects for election were good. However, the outbreak of war postponed the election and by the time the election came along in 1945, the Labour Party had chosen another candidate who won the seat. He did not stand for parliament again.

=== Electoral record ===
General Election 1923: Willesden West
Party	Candidate	Votes	%	±%
Labour	Samuel Viant	14,004	51.3	+2.8
Unionist	George James Furness	8,256	30.3	−18.2
Liberal	David Cleghorn Thomson	5,030	18.4	n/a
Majority		5,748	21.0	24.0
Turnout			69.1	+1.4
Labour gain from Unionist		Swing	+12.0	

General Election 1924: Edinburgh South
Party	Candidate	Votes	%	±%
Unionist	Samuel Chapman	15,854	64.4	
Liberal	David Cleghorn Thomson	8,777	35.6	
Majority				
Turnout				
Unionist hold		Swing		

General Election 1935: Leith
Party	Candidate	Votes	%	±%
National Liberal	Ernest Brown	18,888	57.7	−7.3
Labour	David Cleghorn Thomson	13,818	42.2	+7.3
Majority		5,070	15.5	−14.6
Turnout		32,706	65.5	−9.5
National Liberal hold		Swing	-7.3	

1936 Combined Scottish Universities by-election
Party	Candidate	Votes	%	±%
National Labour	Ramsay MacDonald	16,393	56.5	N/A
SNP	Andrew Dewar Gibb	9,034	31.1	+16.9
Labour	David Cleghorn Thomson	3,597	12.4	N/A
Majority		7,359	37.4	
Turnout			54.8	+3.6
National Labour gain from Unionist		Swing	N/A	

== Later life ==
In 1960 and 1961, Thomson edited Saltire Review, a magazine of Scottish arts, letters and life published by the Saltire Society.
