= List of MPs for constituencies in Scotland (1945–1950) =

- Colours on map indicate the party allegiance of each constituency's MP.

This is a list of the 68 members of Parliament (MPs) elected to the House of Commons of the United Kingdom by Scottish constituencies for the thirty-eighth parliament of the United Kingdom (1945–1950) at the 1945 United Kingdom general election.

== Composition ==
Affiliation	Members
Labour Party	37
Unionist Party	25
National Liberal	3
Independent Labour Party	3
Independent Liberal	2
National	1
Independent Unionist	1
Independent	1
Communist	1
Scottish Liberal Party	0
Total	74

== List ==
MP	Constituency	Party	In constituency since
Hector Hughes	Aberdeen North	Labour Party	1945
Douglas Thomson	Aberdeen South	Unionist Party	1935
Henry Spence	Aberdeenshire East and Kincardineshire	Unionist Party	1945
Duncan McCallum	Argyllshire	Unionist Party	1940 by-election
Thomas Moore	Ayr Burghs	Unionist Party	1925
Charles MacAndrew	Ayrshire North and Bute	Unionist Party	1935
Alexander Sloan	Ayrshire South	Labour Party	1939 South Ayrshire by-election
William Duthie	Banffshire	Unionist Party	1945
John Robertson	Berwick and Haddington	Labour Party	1945
John Timmons	Bothwell	Labour Party	1945
Eric Gandar Dower	Caithness and Sutherland	Unionist Party	1945
Jean Mann	Coatbridge	Labour Party	1945
Niall Macpherson	Dumfriesshire	National Liberal	1945
David Kirkwood	Dumbarton Burghs	Labour Party	1922
Adam McKinlay	Dunbartonshire	Labour Party	1941 by-election
Thomas Cook	Dundee (1)	Labour Party	1945
John Strachey	Dundee (2)	Labour Party	1945
William Watson	Dunfermline Burghs	Labour Party	1935
Andrew Gilzean	Edinburgh Central	Labour Party	1945
Frederick Pethick-Lawrence	Edinburgh East	Labour Party	1935
George Willis	Edinburgh North	Labour Party	1945
William Darling	Edinburgh South	Unionist Party	1945
Ian Clark Hutchison	Edinburgh West	Unionist Party	1941 by-election
James Henderson-Stewart	Fife East	National Liberal	1933 by-election
Willie Gallacher	Fife West	Communist	1935
Simon Ramsay	Forfarshire	Unionist Party	1945
John Mackie	Galloway	Unionist Party	1931
James Maxton	Glasgow Bridgeton	Independent Labour Party	1922
Campbell Stephen	Glasgow Camlachie	Independent Labour Party	1935
Francis Beattie	Glasgow Cathcart	Unionist Party	1942 by-election
James Hutchison	Glasgow Central	Unionist Party	1945
George Buchanan	Glasgow Gorbals	Labour Party	1922
Neil Maclean	Glasgow Govan	Labour Party	1918
James Reid	Glasgow Hillhead	Unionist Party	1937 by-election
John Williams	Glasgow Kelvingrove	Labour Party	1945
William Hannan	Glasgow Maryhill	Labour Party	1945
Arthur Young	Glasgow Partick	Unionist Party	1935
Thomas Galbraith	Glasgow Pollok	Unionist Party	1940 by-election
John McGovern	Glasgow Shettleston	Labour Party	1930 by-election
John Forman	Glasgow Springburn	Labour Party	1945
William Leonard	Glasgow St Rollox	Labour Party	1931 by-election
Hector McNeil	Greenock	Labour Party	1941 by-election
Tom Fraser	Hamilton	Labour Party	1943 by-election
Murdoch Macdonald	Inverness	Independent Liberal	1922 by-election
Clarice Shaw	Kilmarnock	Labour Party	1945
Colin Thornton-Kemsley	Kincardineshire and Western Aberdeenshire	Unionist Party	1939 by-election
William McNair Snadden	Kinross and Western Perthshire	Unionist Party	1938 by-election
Thomas Hubbard	Kirkcaldy Burghs	Labour Party	1944 by-election
Alec Douglas-Home,	Lanark	Unionist Party	1950
Peggy Herbison	Lanarkshire North	Labour Party	1945
James Hoy	Leith	Labour Party	1945
George Mathers	Linlithgowshire	Labour Party	1935
John Hope	Midlothian and Peebles Northern	Unionist Party	1945
John Maclay	Montrose Burghs	National Liberal	1940 by-election
James Stuart	Moray and Nairn	Unionist Party	1923
Alexander Anderson	Motherwell	Labour Party	1945
Jo Grimond	Orkney and Shetland	Liberal Party	1950
Oliver Baldwin	Paisley	Labour Party	1945
Alan Gomme-Duncan	Perth	Unionist Party	1945
Guy Lloyd	Renfrewshire East	Unionist Party	1940 by-election
Thomas Scollan	Renfrewshire West	Labour Party	1945
John MacLeod	Ross and Cromarty	National Liberal	1945
William Montagu Douglas Scott	Roxburgh and Selkirk	Liberal Party	1935
Gilbert McAllister	Rutherglen	Labour Party	1945
Joseph Westwood	Stirling and Falkirk	Labour Party	1935
Arthur Woodburn	Stirlingshire East and Clackmannan	Labour Party	1939 by-election
Alfred Balfour	Stirlingshire West	Labour Party	1945
Malcolm Macmillan	Western Isles	Labour Party	1935

== By-elections ==
There were thirteen by-elections during this period:

- 1945 Edinburgh East by-election
- 1946 South Ayrshire by-election
- 1946 Glasgow Cathcart by-election
- 1946 Glasgow Bridgeton by-election
- 1946 Aberdeen South by-election
- 1946 Combined Scottish Universities by-election
- 1946 Kilmarnock by-election
- 1947 Edinburgh East by-election
- 1948 Glasgow Camlachie by-election
- 1948 Paisley by-election
- 1948 Glasgow Gorbals by-election
- 1948 Stirling and Falkirk by-election
- 1948 Glasgow Hillhead by-election

== See also ==
- 1945 United Kingdom general election in Scotland
