= George Malcolm Thomson =

George Malcolm Thomson may refer to:

- George Thomson (naturalist) (1848–1933), New Zealand scientist, educationalist, social worker and politician
- George Malcolm Thomson (journalist) (1899–1996), Scottish journalist and publicist for Scottish nationalism
