= George Berry (surgeon) =

British politician (1853–1940)

Sir George Andreas Berry FRSE FRCSE
- Born: 6 October 1853; Leith, Scotland
- Died: 18 June 1940 (aged 86); North Berwick, Scotland
- Education: University of Edinburgh
- Occupation: Ophthalmic surgeon
- Known for: Textbook Diseases of the Eye; Presidency Royal College of Surgeons of Edinburgh; Member of Parliament for Scottish Universities
- Spouse: Jean Muir (m. 1883)
- Children: 3
- Medical career
- Institutions: Royal Infirmary of Edinburgh
- Sub-specialties: Ophthalmology

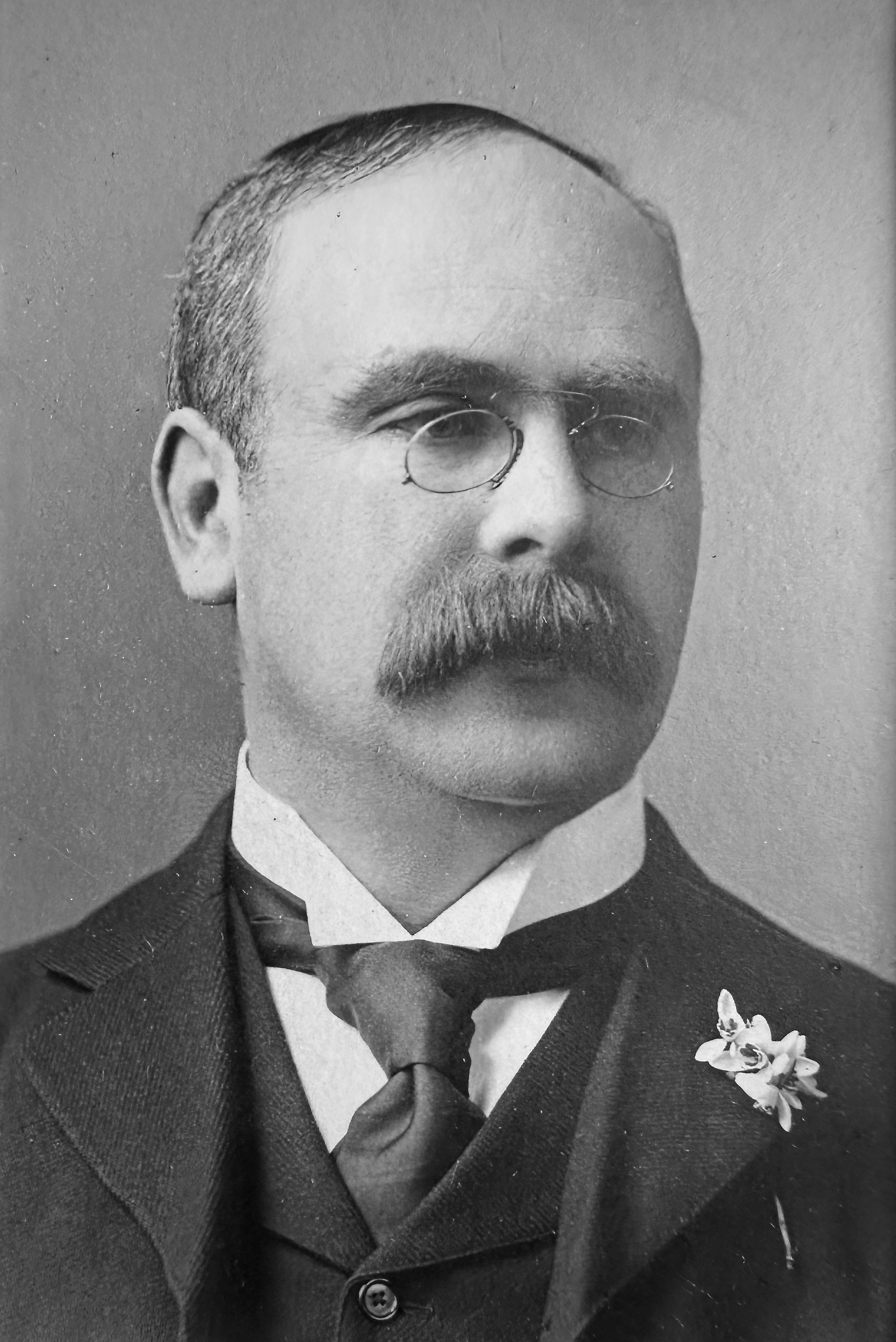
Berry in middle age

Sir George Andreas Berry (6 October 1853 – 18 June 1940) was a Scottish ophthalmic surgeon who acquired a reputation as a leading authority on ophthalmology, not only in the United Kingdom but also in the United States and continental Europe. His standing in the profession was largely the result of his textbooks of ophthalmology which were widely used in his home country and abroad. His working career was spent at the Royal Infirmary of Edinburgh and when he retired from clinical practice in 1905 he became involved in medical and national politics. He was surgeon-oculist in Scotland to King George V and then to King Edward VII and was president of the Royal College of Surgeons of Edinburgh from 1910 to 1912. He was knighted in 1916. At the 1922 general election he was elected as Member of Parliament for the Combined Scottish Universities , sitting as a Scottish Unionist. He held the seat until he stood down at the 1931 general election.

== Early life ==
Berry was born in Leith in 1853. His father was Walter Berry FRSE of Glenstriven in Argyll (d.1904), who was the Danish Consul General for Scotland. Has mother was Emily Berry (née Hensen). He was educated at Marlborough College in Wiltshire. On return to Edinburgh he was uncertain as to a choice of career and enrolled at first in mathematics classes at the University of Edinburgh. He showed a considerable aptitude for mathematics and became one of only six members of the senior mathematics class of Professor Peter Tait, the professor of natural philosophy. Having decided on a career in medicine he matriculated in the University of Edinburgh Medical School. graduating MB CM in 1876

== Clinical career ==
He decided at an early stage to pursue a career in ophthalmology. He was resident house surgeon in Moorfields Eye Hospital in London in 1878-79 and at this very early stage of his career he was an enthusiastic supporter of the formation of the Ophthalmological Society of the United Kingdom which was established in 1880. He was a founder member. In 1881 he became a Fellow of the Royal College of Surgeons of Edinburgh (FRCSEd). He spent some time attending various specialist ophthalmology clinics in continental Europe. In Copenhagen he attended the clinic of his uncle Professor Edmund Hansen Grut and studied under Jannik Bjerrum. He held his uncle in high regard and later dedicated to him the second edition (1893) of his highly successful textbook Diseases of the Eye- a Practical Treatise for Students of Ophthalmology. By training in Copenhagen he established a link between ophthalmology in Copenhagen and Edinburgh and set a precedent which would later be followed by Arthur H H Sinclair and Harry Moss Traquair. Berry also studied ophthalmology in France, Germany, Austria and Holland. These European travels served to improve his skills as a linguist and at a relatively young age he became recognised in European countries as an authority on diseases of the eye.

He was appointed to the staff of the Ophthalmology Department of the Royal Infirmary of Edinburgh (RIE) in 1882. Berry remained on the staff for 23 years becoming senior surgeon, a post from which he retired in 1905. For the same period he held the appointment of lecturer in ophthalmology at the University of Edinburgh.

His reputation as an ophthalmologist extended throughout Europe and the USA largely as a result of the success of Diseases of the Eye- a Practical Treatise for Students of Ophthalmology which became a widely read textbook . The first (1889) and the second (1893) editions were both published in the United Kingdom and in the USA. Its success was because it was widely considered to be a comprehensive account of the state of knowledge of the speciality and also because of the many original observations which it contained. In addition he published two monographs which were widely acclaimed and used, Subjective symptoms in Eye Disease (1886) and The Elements of Ophthalmoscope diagnosis (1891). He later combined many of the elements of these earlier works into the practical textbook Manual of practical ophthalmology. published in 1905 in the UK and the USA . Berry published an early description of the rare facial dysostosis condition which was initially called Berry-Treacher Collins syndrome. The English ophthalmologist Edward Treacher Collins gave a fuller description in 1900 and the condition is now generally known as Treacher Collins syndrome.

In the First World War he served as a territorial officer in the Royal Army Medical Corps with the rank of major. He established and was in charge of the ophthalmic surgery department at the 2nd Scottish General Hospital in Edinburgh which later became the Western General Hospital.He also acted as ophthalmic surgeon to the Craiglockhart.War Hospital.

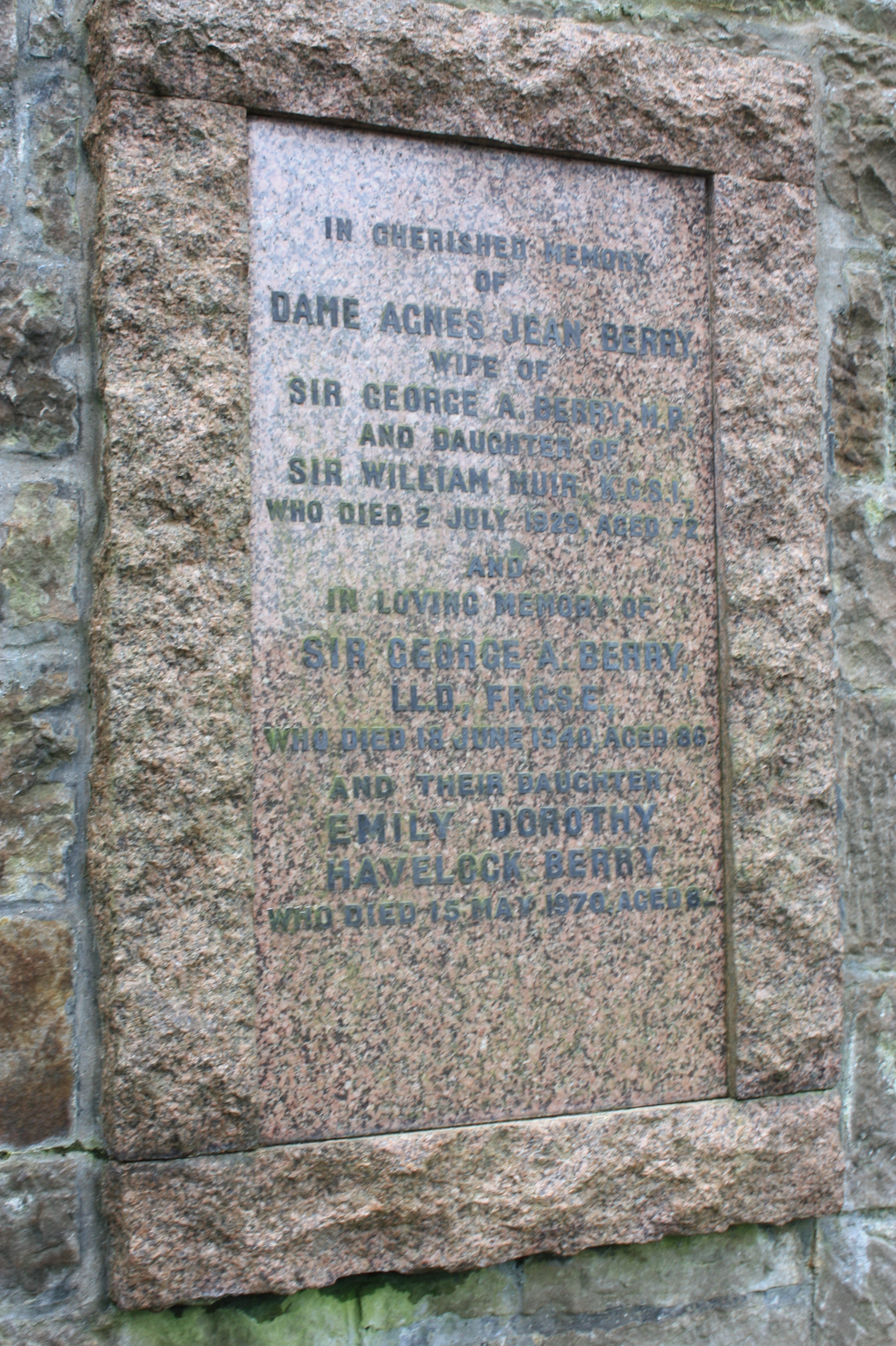
The grave of George Andreas Berry, Dean Cemetery

== Political career ==
When he retired from clinical practice in 1905 at the age of 52 Berry became active in medical and national politics. He became a Manager and subsequently chairman of the Managers' Medical Committee of the RIE. He served as Assessor on the Court of the University of Edinburgh from 1911 to 1923. In 1922 he was elected Member of Parliament MP for the Combined Scottish Universities and held this seat until he stood down at the 1931 election.

== Honours and awards ==
In 1886, at an early stage in his career, Berry was awarded the prestigious Middlemore prize by the British Medical Association (BMA). He went on to become president of the section of ophthalmology of the BMA in 1905.

He was elected a Fellow of the Royal Society of Edinburgh.in 1883. His proposers were Alexander Crum Brown, William Rutherford, Sir Thomas Richard Fraser and Sir Stair Agnew. He went on to become vice-president of the society from 1919 to 1922. In 1904 he was elected a member of the Aesculapian Club and served as Honorary Secretary from 1908 to 1924.

He had been a founder member of the Ophthalmological Society of the United Kingdom and became its president from 1909 to 1911. In 1917 the society awarded him its highest honour by making him Bowman lecturer in 1917. He was elected president of the Royal College of Surgeons of Edinburgh in 1910. He was knighted in 1916.

Sir George Berry acted as Surgeon-oculist in Scotland to King Edward VII and subsequently to King George V . In 1931 he was awarded the honorary degree of LLD by the University of Edinburgh.

== Personal life ==
In 1883 he married Agnes Jean Muir, daughter of Sir William Muir, the Scottish orientalist and writer who became Principal of the University of Edinburgh. They had three daughters. His hobbies included golf and angling and he played the cello. His interest in music led him to be involved in the foundation of the Reid School of Music at the University of Edinburgh. He retired to North Berwick where he died in June 1940. He is buried in Dean Cemetery in western Edinburgh The grave lies on the concealed southern terrace.

His younger brother Edmund Berry (1855-1932) followed in their father's footsteps and became the Danish Consul.

== Selected publications ==
- Diseases of the eye : a practical treatise for students of ophthalmology. Philadelphia : Lea Bros. & Co. Edinburgh: Pentland
- Manual of practical ophthalmology. (1905). Philadelphia: Lippincott. Edinburgh: Pentland
- Subjective Symptoms in Eye Diseases, (1886). Edinburgh: Oliver & Boyd.

Parliament of the United Kingdom
Preceded by Sir William Cheyne; Dugald Cowan; Sir Henry Craik	Member of Parliament for Combined Scottish Universities; 1922 – 1931; With: Dugald Cowan 1918–1934; Sir Henry Craik, to 1927; John Buchan from 1927	Succeeded by Noel Skelton; Dugald Cowan; John Buchan
