= Henry Duffield Craik =

British politician (1876–1955)

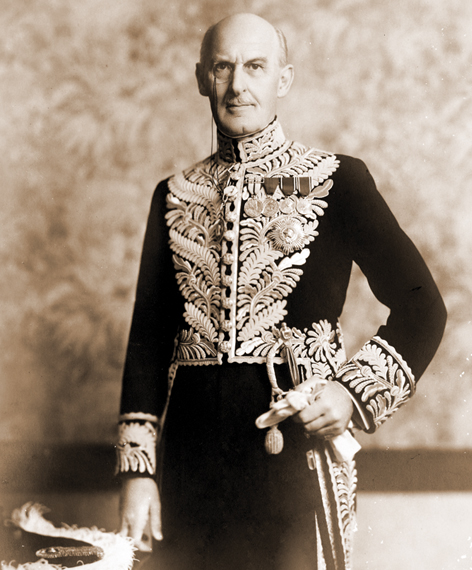
Former Governor of Punjab

Sir Henry Duffield Craik, 3rd Baronet, KCSI (2 January 1876 – 27 March 1955) was a member of the Indian Civil Service during the British Raj.

He was born in Kensington, London the son of Sir Henry Craik, 1st Baronet. He was educated at Eton College and Pembroke College, Oxford. He began his career in the Indian Civil Service as a settlement officer in the Punjab in 1899. He served as Chief Secretary of the Punjab between 1922 and 1927 and was made Commissioner in 1927. He succeeded his brother George to the Craik baronetcy in 1929. He became a member of the Punjab Executive Council in 1934, and that same year was appointed to the Viceroy's Executive Council. He served as Governor of the Punjab between 1938 and 1941.

He died on 27th March 1955 and was buried on the western side of Highgate Cemetery.

== Arms ==
Coat of arms of Henry Duffield Craik

Crest
An anchor Proper.
Escutcheon
Argent on a sea in base undy Azure and of the firs a three masted ship under full sail Proper flagged Gules on a chief indented of the last a book expanded of the first leaved Or between two antique lamps of the last.
Motto
Tendimus

Baronetage of the United Kingdom
Preceded by George Craik	Baronet (of Kennoway); 1929–1955	Extinct
