= Craik baronets =

Extinct baronetcy in the Baronetage of the United Kingdom

The Craik Baronetcy, of Kennoway in the County of Fife, was a title in the Baronetage of the United Kingdom. It was created on 27 January 1926 for the politician Sir Henry Craik, KCB, PC. The title became extinct in 1955 on the death of his younger son, the 3rd Baronet.

== Craik Baronets, of Kennoway (1926) ==
- Sir Henry Craik, 1st Baronet (1846–1927)
- Sir George Lillie Craik, MC, 2nd Baronet (1874–1929)
- Sir Henry Duffield Craik, KCSI 3rd Baronet (1876–1955), Governor of the Punjab 1938–41

== Arms ==
Coat of arms of Craik baronets

Crest
An anchor Proper.
Escutcheon
Argent on a sea in base undy Azure and of the firs a three masted ship under full sail Proper flagged Gules on a chief indented of the last a book expanded of the first leaved Or between two antique lamps of the last.
Motto
Tendimus

== Sources ==
- Leigh Rayment's Baronetage page
- "thePeerage.com: Sir Henry Craik, 1st Baronet".
