= 1935 Combined Scottish Universities by-election =

UK parliamentary by-election

- 17–22 June 1935

Constituency of Combined Scottish Universities
- Turnout: 48.1%
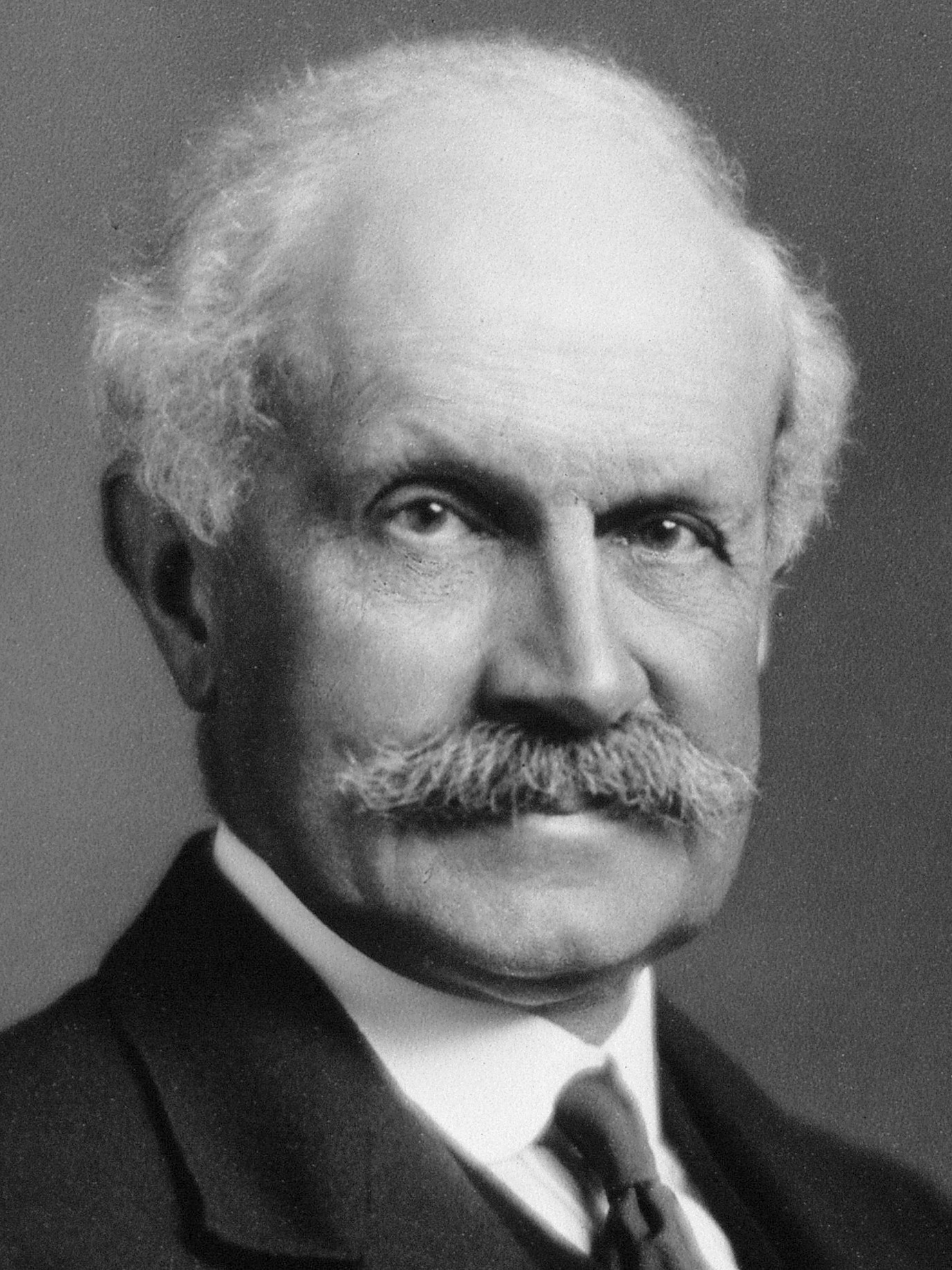

	First party	Second party
Candidate	John Graham Kerr	Naomi Mitchison
Party	Unionist	Labour
Popular vote	20,507	4,293
Percentage	82.7%	17.3%
MP before election
John Buchan
Unionist
Subsequent MP
John Graham Kerr
Unionist

The 1935 Combined Scottish Universities by-election was a by-election held from 17 to 22 June 1935 for the Combined Scottish Universities, a university constituency of the British House of Commons.

== Vacancy ==
The seat had become vacant when the sitting Unionist Member of Parliament (MP), John Buchan had resigned his seat when he was appointed as Governor General of Canada. He had held the seat since a by-election in April 1927.

== Candidates ==
The Unionist candidate was 55-year-old John Graham Kerr, Regius Professor of Zoology at the University of Glasgow. The Labour Party candidate was the novelist and poet Naomi Mitchison. There was no Liberal Party candidate.

Neither Kerr nor Mitchison had previously contested a parliamentary election.

== Result ==
The result was a victory for the Unionist candidate, Prof. Kerr, who won over 80% of the votes. He resigned his university chair, held the seat until the university constituencies were abolished for the 1950 general election.

Combined Scottish Universities by-election, 17-22 June 1935
Party	Candidate	Votes	%	±%
Unionist	John Graham Kerr	20,507	82.7	N/A
Labour	Naomi Mitchison	4,293	17.3	−3.5
Majority		16,214	65.4	N/A
Turnout		24,800	48.1	N/A
Unionist hold		Swing	N/A	

== Previous general election ==
General election, October 1931: Combined Scottish Universities
Party	Candidate	Votes	%	±%
Unionist	John Buchan	Unopposed	N/A	N/A
Liberal	Dugald Cowan	Unopposed	N/A	N/A
Unionist	Noel Skelton	Unopposed	N/A	N/A

== See also ==
- Combined Scottish Universities (UK Parliament constituency)
- 1927 Combined Scottish Universities by-election
- 1934 Combined Scottish Universities by-election
- 1936 Combined Scottish Universities by-election
- 1938 Combined Scottish Universities by-election
- 1945 Combined Scottish Universities by-election
- 1946 Combined Scottish Universities by-election
- List of United Kingdom by-elections (1931–1950)

== Sources ==
- Craig, F. W. S. (1983) [1969]. British parliamentary election results 1918-1949 (3rd ed.). Chichester: Parliamentary Research Services. ISBN 0-900178-06-X.
- Leigh Rayment's Historical List of MPs
