= Combined Scottish Universities =

- Former university constituency for the House of Commons

1918–1950
- Seats: Three
- Created from: Glasgow & Aberdeen Universities; Edinburgh and St Andrews Universities

The Combined Scottish Universities was a three-member university constituency of the House of Commons of the Parliament of the United Kingdom from 1918 until 1950. It was created by merging the single-member constituencies of Glasgow and Aberdeen Universities and Edinburgh and St Andrews Universities.

== Boundaries ==
The constituency was not a physical area but was rather elected by the graduates of the Scottish Universities of St Andrews, Edinburgh, Glasgow and Aberdeen.

The constituency returned three Members of Parliament to Westminster, elected by Single Transferable Vote. The by-elections used the first past the post voting system.

This University constituency was created by the Representation of the People Act 1918 and abolished in 1950 by the Representation of the People Act 1948.

== Members of Parliament ==
Election	First member	First party	Second member	Second party	Third member	Third party
1918	Sir William Cheyne	Coalition Conservative	Dugald McCoig Cowan	Coalition Liberal	Sir Henry Craik	Coalition Conservative
1922	Sir George Berry	Unionist	Dugald McCoig Cowan	Liberal	Sir Henry Craik	Unionist
Apr 1927	Sir George Berry	Unionist	Dugald McCoig Cowan	Liberal	John Buchan	Unionist
1931	Noel Skelton	Unionist	Dugald McCoig Cowan	Liberal	John Buchan	Unionist
Mar 1934	Noel Skelton	Unionist	George Alexander Morrison	Liberal	John Buchan	Unionist
Jun 1935	Noel Skelton	Unionist	George Alexander Morrison	National Liberal	Sir John Kerr	Unionist
Jan 1936	Ramsay MacDonald	National Labour	George Alexander Morrison	National Liberal	Sir John Kerr	Unionist
Feb 1938	Sir John Anderson	National	George Alexander Morrison	National Liberal	Sir John Kerr	Unionist
Apr 1945	Sir John Anderson	National	Sir John Boyd-Orr	Independent	Sir John Kerr	Unionist
Nov 1946	Sir John Anderson	National	Walter Elliot	Unionist	Sir John Kerr	Unionist
1950	University constituencies abolished					

== Election results ==
=== Elections in the 1910s ===
Dugald Cowan

General election, November 1918: Combined Scottish Universities
Party	Candidate	Votes	%	±%
Unionist	✓ Watson Cheyne	3,719	28.7	
Liberal	✓ Dugald Cowan	3,499	27.0	
Unionist	✓ Henry Craik	3,286	25.4	
Labour	Peter Macdonald	1,581	12.2	
Independent	William Robert Smith	850	6.6	
Majority		1,705	13.2	
Turnout		12,935		
Unionist win (new seat)				
Liberal win (new seat)				
Unionist win (new seat)				

=== Elections in the 1920s ===
General election 1922: Combined Scottish Universities
Party	Candidate	Votes	%	±%
Unionist	George Andreas Berry	Unopposed	N/A	N/A
Liberal	Dugald Cowan	Unopposed	N/A	N/A
Unionist	Henry Craik	Unopposed	N/A	N/A

General election 1923: Combined Scottish Universities
Party	Candidate	Votes	%	±%
Unionist	George Andreas Berry	Unopposed	N/A	N/A
Liberal	Dugald Cowan	Unopposed	N/A	N/A
Unionist	Henry Craik	Unopposed	N/A	N/A

General election 1924: Combined Scottish Universities
Party	Candidate	Votes	%	±%
Unionist	Henry Craik	7,188	40.8	N/A
Liberal	Dugald Cowan	5,011	28.4	N/A
Unionist	George Andreas Berry	3,781	21.5	N/A
Labour	John Martin Munro	1,639	9.3	New
Majority		2,142	12.2	N/A
Turnout		17,619	55.1	N/A
Unionist hold		Swing	N/A	
Liberal hold		Swing	N/A	
Unionist hold		Swing	N/A	

1927 Combined Scottish Universities by-election
Party	Candidate	Votes	%	±%
Unionist	John Buchan	16,963	87.7	+66.2
Labour	Hugh Guthrie	2,378	12.3	+3.0
Majority		14,585	75.4	+63.2
Turnout		19,341	55.1	0.0
Unionist hold		Swing		

General election 1929: Combined Scottish Universities (3 seats)
Party	Candidate	FPv%	Count	
Party	Candidate	FPv%	1	2
Unionist	John Buchan	39.7	9,959	
Liberal	Dugald Cowan	26.7	6,698	
Unionist	George Berry	22.9	5,755	9,262
Labour	James Kerr (Scottish doctor)	10.7	2,691	2,867
Electorate: 43,192 Valid: 25,103 Quota: 6,276 Turnout: 25,103

=== Elections in the 1930s ===
General election, October 1931: Combined Scottish Universities
Party	Candidate	Votes	%	±%
Unionist	John Buchan	Unopposed	N/A	N/A
Liberal	Dugald Cowan	Unopposed	N/A	N/A
Unionist	Noel Skelton	Unopposed	N/A	N/A

1934 Combined Scottish Universities by-election
Party	Candidate	Votes	%	±%
Liberal	George Morrison	18,070	79.2	N/A
Labour	Robert Gibson	4,750	20.8	New
Majority		13,320	58.4	N/A
Turnout		22,820	44.3	N/A
Liberal hold		Swing	N/A	

1935 Combined Scottish Universities by-election
Party	Candidate	Votes	%	±%
Unionist	John Graham Kerr	20,507	82.7	N/A
Labour	Naomi Mitchison	4,293	17.3	−3.5
Majority		16,214	65.4	N/A
Turnout		24,800	48.1	
Unionist hold		Swing		

General election, November 1935: Combined Scottish Universities
Party	Candidate	Votes	%	±%
Unionist	John Graham Kerr	8,252	30.4	N/A
National Liberal	George Morrison	7,529	27.7	N/A
Unionist	Noel Skelton	7,479	27.6	N/A
SNP	Andrew Dewar Gibb	3,865	14.2	New
Majority		723	13.4	N/A
Turnout		27,125	51.2	N/A
Unionist hold		Swing		

1936 Combined Scottish Universities by-election
Party	Candidate	Votes	%	±%
National Labour	Ramsay MacDonald	16,393	56.5	N/A
SNP	Andrew Dewar Gibb	9,034	31.1	+16.9
Labour	David Cleghorn Thomson	3,597	12.4	New
Majority		7,359	37.4	N/A
Turnout		29,024	54.8	+3.6
National Labour gain from Unionist		Swing		

1938 Combined Scottish Universities by-election
Party	Candidate	Votes	%	±%
National	John Anderson	14,042	48.8	−7.7
Independent	Frances H. Melville	5,618	19.5	New
SNP	Andrew Dewar Gibb	5,246	18.2	−12.9
Independent Progressive	Peter Chalmers Mitchell	3,868	13.5	New
Majority		8,424	29.3	+3.9
Turnout		28,774	52.1	−2.7
National hold		Swing		

=== Elections in the 1940s ===
1945 Combined Scottish Universities by-election
Party	Candidate	Votes	%	±%
Independent	John Boyd-Orr	20,197	71.2	N/A
National Liberal	R.M. Munro	8,177	28.8	N/A
Majority		12,020	43.4	N/A
Turnout		28,374	44.6	−7.5
Registered electors		63,581		
Independent gain from National Liberal		Swing		

1945 general election: Combined Scottish Universities
Party	Candidate	Votes	%	±%
National	✓ John Anderson	16,011	48.8	N/A
Independent	✓ John Boyd-Orr	10,685	32.6	N/A
Labour	Halliday Sutherland	2,860	8.7	N/A
Liberal	Ralph Somerville Weir	1,872	5.7	N/A
Unionist	✓ John Graham Kerr	1,361	4.2	−53.8
Majority		7,825	23.9	
Turnout		32,789	51.6	+0.4
National hold		Swing		
Independent gain from Unionist		Swing		
Unionist hold		Swing		

1946 Combined Scottish Universities by-election
Party	Candidate	Votes	%	±%
Unionist	Walter Elliot	22,152	68.2	+64.0
Labour	C. E. M. Joad	3,731	11.5	+2.8
Liberal	John Bannerman	2,593	8.0	+2.3
Independent	J. G. Jameson	2,080	6.4	N/A
National Liberal	Robert Scott Stevenson	1,938	5.9	N/A
Majority		18,421	56.7	N/A
Turnout		32,494	50.7	−0.9
Unionist gain from Independent		Swing		

Parliament of the United Kingdom
Preceded by Woolwich West	Constituency represented by the chancellor of the Exchequer; 1943–1945	Succeeded by Bishop Auckland
