= Sir Henry Craik, 1st Baronet =

Scottish politician

Sir Henry Craik, 1st Baronet, KCB, PC (18 October 1846 – 16 March 1927) was a Scottish Unionist politician.

He was appointed as a junior examiner of the Committee of Council on Education in 1871 and promoted, in 1878, to the position of Senior examiner until 1885. In this year Scotland got an independent Committee of Council on Education known as the Scotch Education Department. Craik was appointed as its secretary, a post he held from 1885 to 1904. In October 1901 he received a degree in law (LL.D.) from the University of St Andrews.

He was an elected Member of Parliament (MP) for Glasgow and Aberdeen Universities from 1906 to 1918, and for the Combined Scottish Universities from 1918 until his death in 1927.

He was made a Companion of the Order of the Bath (CB) in 1888, and promoted to Knight Commander (KCB) in 1897. He was made a Privy Councillor in 1918, and in the New Year Honours List 1926, he was made a baronet, of Kennoway, in the County of Fife.

== Family ==
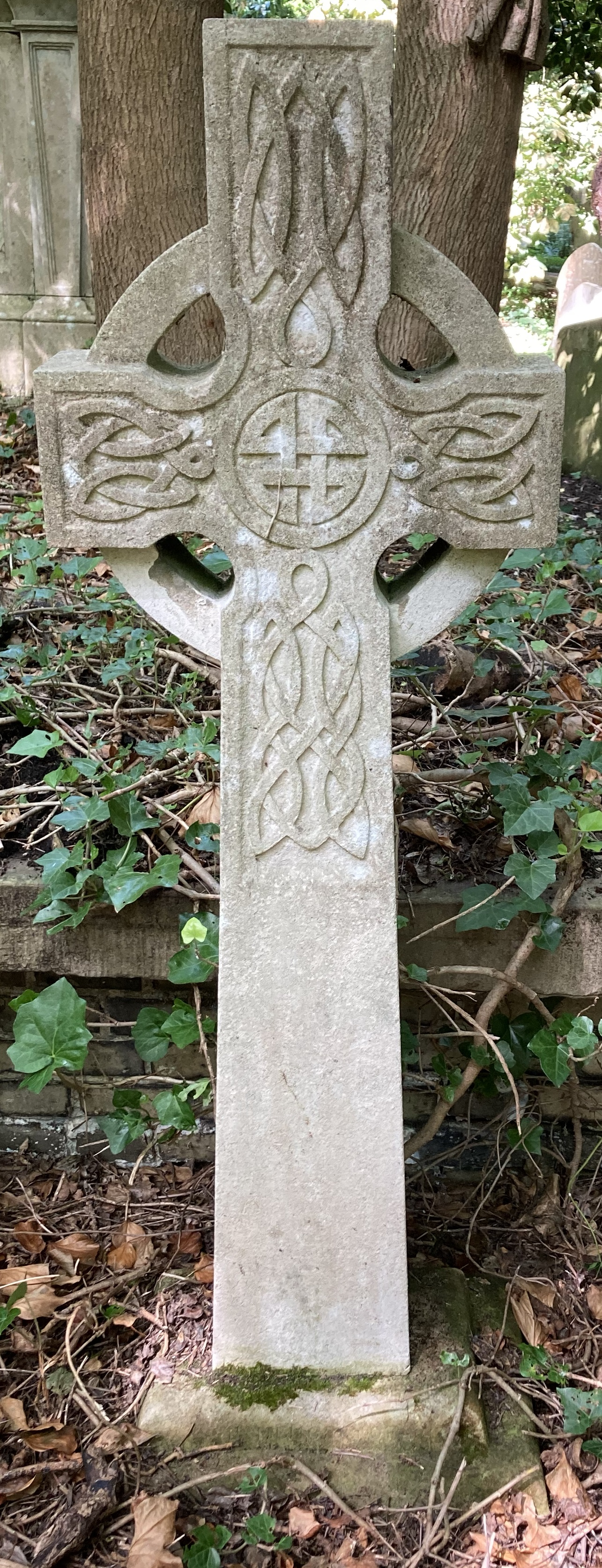
Grave of Sir Henry Craik in Highgate Cemetery.

Craik was born on 18 October 1846 in Glasgow. Son of the Rev. James Craik, D.D., a prominent clergyman and Moderator of the Church of Scotland. He married on 17 December 1873 Fanny Esther Duffield, daughter of Charles Duffield. They had two children: George Lillie (1874–1929) and Henry Duffield (1876–1955).

Craik died on 16 March 1927 and was buried on the western side of Highgate Cemetery. George succeeded his father in the baronetcy and died two years later. He was succeeded by his brother Henry, who was Governor of the Punjab from 1938 to 1941.

== Arms ==
Coat of arms of Sir Henry Craik, 1st Baronet

Crest
An anchor Proper.
Escutcheon
Argent on a sea in base undy Azure and of the firs a three masted ship under full sail Proper flagged Gules on a chief indented of the last a book expanded of the first leaved Or between two antique lamps of the last.
Motto
Tendimus

Parliament of the United Kingdom
Preceded by James Alexander Campbell	Member of Parliament for Glasgow and Aberdeen Universities; 1906–1918	Constituency abolished
New constituency	Member of Parliament for the Combined Scottish Universities; 1918–1927; With: Sir William Cheyne, 1918–1922; Dugald Cowan, 1918–1934; George Berry, 1922–1931	Succeeded by Dugald Cowan and George Berry and John Buchan
Political offices
Preceded by Edward Goulding	Oldest Member of Parliament; 1922–1927	Succeeded by Sir James Agg-Gardner
Baronetage of the United Kingdom
New creation	Baronet (of Kennoway); 1926–1927	Succeeded by George Lillie Craik
