= 1927 Combined Scottish Universities by-election =

UK parliamentary by-election

- 26–29 April 1927

Constituency of Combined Scottish Universities
- Turnout: 55.1%
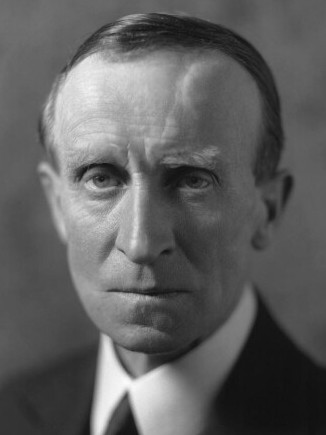
	First party	Second party
		Lab
Candidate	John Buchan	Hugh Guthrie
Party	Unionist	Labour
Popular vote	16,963	2,378
Percentage	87.7%	12.3%
MP before election
Sir Henry Craik, Bt.
Unionist
Subsequent MP
John Buchan
Unionist

The 1927 Combined Scottish Universities by-election was a by-election held from 26 to 29 April 1927 for the Combined Scottish Universities, a university constituency of the British House of Commons.

== Vacancy ==
The seat had become vacant on 16 March 1927 when the Unionist Member of Parliament (MP) Sir Henry Craik, Bt. had died, aged 80. He had held the seat since its creation for the 1918 general election, having previously been MP for Glasgow and Aberdeen Universities.

== Candidates ==
Two candidates contested the by-election. John Buchan, the novelist, of the Unionist Party and Hugh Guthrie of the Labour Party, who had contested Glasgow Camlachie at the 1918 general election.

== Result ==
The result was a victory for Buchan, who won nearly 88% of the votes. He held the seat until 1935, when he resigned to take up the post of Governor General of Canada.

Combined Scottish Universities by-election, 26-29 April 1927
Party	Candidate	Votes	%	±%
Unionist	John Buchan	16,963	87.7	+66.2
Labour	Hugh Guthrie	2,378	12.3	+3.0
Majority		14,585	75.4	+63.2
Turnout		19,341	55.1	0.0
Unionist hold		Swing		

== See also ==
- Combined Scottish Universities (UK Parliament constituency)
- 1934 Combined Scottish Universities by-election
- 1935 Combined Scottish Universities by-election
- 1936 Combined Scottish Universities by-election
- 1938 Combined Scottish Universities by-election
- 1945 Combined Scottish Universities by-election
- 1946 Combined Scottish Universities by-election
- List of United Kingdom by-elections (1918–1931)

== Sources ==
- Craig, F. W. S. (1983) [1969]. British parliamentary election results 1918-1949 (3rd ed.). Chichester: Parliamentary Research Services. ISBN 0-900178-06-X.
- Leigh Rayment's Historical List of MPs
