= Saltire Society =

Scottish cultural organization

The Saltire Society, also called Saltire Society Scotland (Scottish Gaelic: Cumann Crann na h-Alba) is a membership organisation which aims to promote the understanding of the culture and heritage of Scotland, founded in 1936. The society organises lectures and publishes pamphlets, and presents a series of awards in the fields of art, architecture, literature and history.

== History ==
The society was founded on 22 April 1936 in Glasgow, conceived by Andrew Dewar Gibb and George Malcolm Thomson, at which time the annual subscription cost five shillings. The society was "set up to promote and celebrate the uniqueness of Scottish culture and Scotland's heritage, and to reclaim Scotland's place as a distinct contributor to European and international culture".

By the early 1950s, the society had almost 2000 members. In 1954 they launched a literary magazine, The Scots Review, published three times a year. In 1968 the society appointed their first full-time director, based at their headquarters at Gladstone's Land in Edinburgh. In 2001, the Saltire Society's head, Scott Peake, stepped down after newspaper investigations revealed that he had fabricated parts of his biography, including his alleged Scottish upbringing. In November 2012, ahead of the Scottish Independence referendum, the society looked to relaunch itself with a business plan that included lectures and debates centered around cultural issues. Past presidents include Eric Linklater, architect Robert Matthew, architect Robert Hurd and literary scholar David Daiches.

The Saltire Music Group was founded by composer Isobel Dunlop in 1950.

== Description and activities ==
The Saltire Society is headquartered in Edinburgh, with branches in Aberdeen, Dumfries, Glasgow, Helensburgh, the Highlands, Kirriemuir, and New York City.

In June 2018, the Principal and Vice-Chancellor of the University of St Andrews, Sally Mapstone, was appointed as president of the society.

The society organises lectures and publishes pamphlets, and presents a series of awards in the fields of art, architecture, literature and history.

== Awards ==
The Saltire Awards is a collective name for a series of awards presented by the Saltire Society in recognition of contributions to Scotland's cultural heritage. These include:

- Scotland's National Book Awards, formerly known as the Saltire Society Literary Awards, "the oldest... awards for Scottish based authors in their home nation"
- National Scottish Song Competition, established in 1980 to encourage young people to participate in traditional singing.
- Arts and Crafts in Architecture Award
- Saltire Society Civil Engineering Awards, awarded in association with the Institution of Civil Engineers
- Saltire Society Housing Design Awards
- Andrew Fletcher of Saltoun Award, established in 1988, presented in recognition of "a significant contribution made to Scottish culture"
