= Dugald Cowan =

British politician

Dugald Cowan

Dugald McCoig Cowan (17 October 1865 – 30 December 1933) was a Scottish educationalist and Liberal politician.

== Family and education ==
Cowan was born in Maryhill, Glasgow the son of John and Christina Cowan. He was educated at Glasgow Free Church Training College and Glasgow University. He held MA and LL.B degrees. He never married.

== Career ==
Cowan was a schoolteacher and an expert on the subject of education. He was Headmaster of North Kelvinside Higher Grade School from 1896 to 1919 and he played a large part in educational activities in Scotland in particular through the Educational Institute of Scotland, but also through Glasgow University and the Corporation of the City of Glasgow as well as other bodies. He authored a number of school text books and wrote articles on educational themes. He was credited with improving educational provision and helping to raise teachers’ salaries and promoting teachers' pension provision.

== Politics ==
=== 1918 ===
Cowan was elected at the 1918 general election as Coalition Liberal Member of Parliament (MP) for the Universities of Scotland. This was a three-member seat and Cowan was elected with two Coalition Unioinsts.

=== 1922-1923 ===
Cowan was returned unopposed in at the 1922 general election as a Liberal and was again unopposed in 1923.

=== 1924-1929 ===
In 1924 and 1929 United Kingdom general election there was a Labour candidate but Cowan was re-elected with two Conservatives on each occasion.

The 1924 election was carried under the single transferable vote system. The quota required to be elected was 4,405. Craik and Cowan received more than the quota on the first count and were declared elected. The redistribution of their second votes put Berry over the quota and he too was elected.

The 1929 election was carried under the same system. The quota required to be elected was 6,276. John Buchan and Cowan received more than the quota on the first count and were declared elected. The redistribution of their second votes was again enough to put Berry over the quota and he too was re-elected.

=== 1931 ===
At the 1931 general election he was again returned unopposed, with two Conservatives.

== Death ==
Cowan died in office on 30 December 1933, aged 68 years in a Glasgow nursing home, having been unwell for some time and receiving treatment in the home.

Parliament of the United Kingdom
New constituency	Member of Parliament for the Combined Scottish Universities; 1918–1934; With: Sir William Cheyne, to 1922; Sir Henry Craik, to 1927; George Berry, 1922–1931; John Buchan, 1927–1935; Noel Skelton, 1931–1936	Succeeded by Noel Skelton and George Morrison and John Buchan
