= Hugh Guthrie (Scottish politician) =

Scottish politician

Hugh Boyd Guthrie (5 June 1879 – 26 February 1946) was a Scottish socialist politician.

Born in Kilmarnock, Guthrie was educated at the University of Glasgow. He became a schoolteacher and joined the Educational Institute of Scotland (EIS). He also joined the Independent Labour Party (ILP). He gradually rose to prominence, serving as the Scottish member of its National Administrative Council, and also on the party's Scottish Divisional Council, and as chair of its Glasgow Federation.

At the 1918 UK general election, Guthrie stood for the Labour Party in Glasgow Camlachie, taking 33.1% of the vote and second place. He next stood in the 1927 Combined Scottish Universities by-election but took less than one-eight of the vote and so lost his deposit.

By 1929, Guthrie was headteacher of a school. He served for many years as the organising secretary of the Renfrewshire Association of the EIS and, in 1929, was the union's national president.

Party political offices
Preceded by J. B. Houston	Scottish Division representative on the Independent Labour Party National Administrative Council; 1919–1920	Succeeded by Manny Shinwell
