= William Power (Scottish politician) =

Scottish politician (1873–1951)

Leader of the Scottish National Party
- In office 1940 – 30 May 1942
- Preceded by: Andrew Dewar Gibb
- Succeeded by: Douglas Young

Personal details
- Born: 30 August 1873 Glasgow, Scotland
- Died: 13 June 1951 (aged 77) Alloa, Clackmannanshire, Scotland
- Party: Scottish National Party
- Spouse(s): Giulia Dick (m 1871–1922); Williamina Mills (m. 1924–1946)
- Profession: Bank clerk; Journalist

William Power (30 August 1873 – 13 June 1951) was a Scottish writer, journalist, and politician. He was the leader of the Scottish National Party from 1940 to 1942, and served as President of the Scottish Convention between 1942 and 1951.

== Early life ==
William Power was born in Woodlands, Glasgow, the eldest of the five children of William Power snr, a commission agent and ship master. He attended Woodside School in Glasgow, but had to leave at the age of fourteen as a result of his father's death at Gibraltar from fever, and found work as a bank clerk at the Royal Bank of Scotland. He continued to read and educate himself, and frequently contributed essays and articles to newspapers.

== Writer and editor ==
In 1907, after working as a bank clerk for twenty years, Power joined The Glasgow Herald as a full-time member of its editorial staff and remained there as essay and leader writer for nearly twenty years. A considerable essayist and critic, Power was a supporter of the Scottish Renaissance literary movement in the 1920s. In 1926 he left the Glasgow Herald to become editor of the Scots Observer, a new weekly newspaper which was supported by the Scottish churches. However, the paper was not a commercial success, and he resigned as editor in 1929 to work for Associated Newspapers. Power was a founding member of the Scottish centre of PEN International. He was vice-president in 1930. He served as president of Scottish PEN from 1935 to 1938. He was also president of the Glasgow Esperanto Society, and the Scottish Ramblers' Federation.

== Political career ==
On 12 March 1940, at the age of 66, Power was announced the Scottish National Party (SNP) candidate in the by-election. Power had come from nowhere to poll 37% (7,308 votes), coming second behind the Conservative Party, registering the SNP's largest percentage of a by-election vote to date. Power succeeded Andrew Dewar Gibb as the leader of the SNP. At the SNP Annual Conference in May 1942, Power was re-nominated by John MacCormick for the post of leader of the SNP, but he was narrowly defeated (33 votes to 29) by Douglas Young. This led MacCormick to convene a meeting of his supporters, which established Scottish Convention.

Power died in Clackmannan County Hospital, Alloa, in June 1951, aged 77. He was married in 1906 to Giulia Dick (1871–1922), and in 1924 to his second wife, Williamina Mills (1877–1946). There were no children of either marriage.

== Publications ==
- The World Unvisited, 1922
- Robert Burns and other Essays and Sketches, 1926
- My Scotland, 1934
- Scotland and the Scots, 1934
- Literature and Oatmeal, 1935
- Should Auld Acquaintance … : an Autobiography, 1937
- The Culture of the Scots: its Past and Future, 1943

Party political offices
Preceded by Andrew Dewar Gibb	Chairman (Leader) of the Scottish National Party; 1940–1942	Succeeded by Douglas Young
