= George Morrison (British politician) =

George Alexander Morrison (30 October 1869 – 8 September 1956) was a Scottish headmaster of Robert Gordon's College for 13 years and later a Liberal Party and then National Liberal Party politician in the United Kingdom.

== Early life and teaching ==
Morrison was born on 30 October 1869 in Scotland and he was educated at Mortlach School and Aberdeen University. After he graduated in 1890 he joined Robert Gordon's College in Aberdeen as a teacher, later becoming principal teacher of classics. In 1910 he became Rector of Inverness Royal Academy. In 1920 he returned to Robert Gordon's College as headmaster, a post he held until his retirement in 1933.

== Politics ==
Following his retirement from Robert Gordon's College he stood and was elected as Member of Parliament (MP) for the Combined Scottish Universities at a by-election in 1934. He resigned the Liberal whip in July 1935 to join the National Liberals, and was re-elected at the 1935 as a National Liberal. He resigned his seat on 6 March 1945, triggering another by-election.

== Family life ==
Morrison married Rachel Campbell in 1913 and they had two sons and a daughter. Morrison died in a nursing home in Lossiemouth, Scotland on 8 September 1956.

Parliament of the United Kingdom
Preceded by Noel Skelton and Dugald Cowan and John Buchan	Member of Parliament for the Combined Scottish Universities; 1934–1945; With: Noel Skelton, to 1936; John Buchan, to 1935; Sir John Graham Kerr, to 1935; Ramsay MacDonald, 1936–1937; Sir John Anderson, from 1938	Succeeded by Sir John Anderson and Sir John Boyd Orr and Sir John Graham Kerr
