= 1934 Combined Scottish Universities by-election =

1934 UK Parliamentary by-election

The 1934 Combined Scottish Universities by-election was a by-election held from 7 to 12 March 1934 for the Combined Scottish Universities, a university constituency of the British House of Commons.

== Vacancy ==
The seat had become vacant on 30 December 1933 when the Liberal Member of Parliament (MP) Dugald Cowan had died, aged 68. He had held the seat since its creation for the 1918 general election.

== Candidates ==
Two candidates contested the by-election. The Liberal Party candidate was Dr George Morrison.

The other candidate was Robert Gibson of the Labour Party, who had unsuccessfully contested Roxburgh and Selkirk in 1929 and Edinburgh North in 1931.

== Result ==
The result was a clear victory for Morrison, who won nearly 80% of the votes. He joined the Liberal National Party in 1935 and held the seat until his resignation in 1945, triggering another by-election.

Gibson unsuccessfully contested Dundee at the 1935 general election, and was elected as MP for Greenock at a by-election in 1936.

Combined Scottish Universities by-election, 7-12 March 1934
Party	Candidate	Votes	%	±%
Liberal	George Morrison	18,070	79.2	N/A
Labour	Robert Gibson	4,750	20.8	New
Majority		13,320	58.4	N/A
Turnout		22,820	44.3	N/A
Liberal hold		Swing	N/A	

== See also ==
- Combined Scottish Universities (UK Parliament constituency)
- 1927 Combined Scottish Universities by-election
- 1935 Combined Scottish Universities by-election
- 1936 Combined Scottish Universities by-election
- 1938 Combined Scottish Universities by-election
- 1945 Combined Scottish Universities by-election
- 1946 Combined Scottish Universities by-election
- List of United Kingdom by-elections (1918–1931)

== Sources ==
- Craig, F. W. S. (1983) [1969]. British parliamentary election results 1918-1949 (3rd ed.). Chichester: Parliamentary Research Services. ISBN 0-900178-06-X.
- Leigh Rayment's Historical List of MPs
