= 1945 Combined Scottish Universities by-election =

1945 UK Parliamentary by-election

- 9–13 April 1945

Constituency of Combined Scottish Universities
- Turnout: 44.6% (▼7.5%)
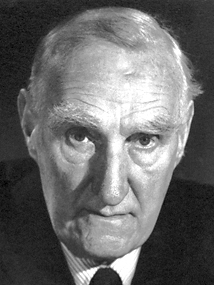
	First party	Second party
		LNP
Candidate	John Boyd Orr	R. M. Munro
Party	Independent	Liberal National
Popular vote	20,197	8,177
Percentage	71.2%	28.8%
MP before election
George Morrison
Liberal National
Subsequent MP
John Boyd Orr
Independent

The 1945 Combined Scottish Universities by-election was a by-election held from 9 to 13 April 1945 for the Combined Scottish Universities, a university constituency of the British House of Commons.

== Vacancy ==
The seat had become vacant on 6 March 1945 when the Liberal National Member of Parliament (MP) George Morrison had resigned by the procedural device of accepting the post of Crown Steward and Bailiff of the Manor of Northstead, a notional 'office of profit under the crown' which is used as a procedural device to enable MPs to resign from the Commons.

== Candidates ==
Two candidates contested the by-election. The Rector of the University of Glasgow, Sir John Boyd Orr, stood as an independent. He was a doctor and biologist, and founder of the Rowett Research Institute.

The other candidate was R. M. Munro of the Liberal National Party.

== Result ==
The result was a victory for Boyd Orr, who won over 70% of the votes. He held the seat until 1946, when he resigned to take up the post of Director of the United Nations Food and Agriculture Organization.

Combined Scottish Universities by-election, 9–13 April 1945
Party	Candidate	Votes	%	±%
Independent	John Boyd Orr	20,197	71.2	N/A
Liberal National	R. M.Munro	8,177	28.8	N/A
Majority		12,020	42.4	N/A
Turnout		28,374	44.6	−7.5
Independent gain from Liberal National		Swing		

== See also ==
- Combined Scottish Universities (UK Parliament constituency)
- 1927 Combined Scottish Universities by-election
- 1934 Combined Scottish Universities by-election
- 1935 Combined Scottish Universities by-election
- 1936 Combined Scottish Universities by-election
- 1938 Combined Scottish Universities by-election
- 1946 Combined Scottish Universities by-election
- List of United Kingdom by-elections (1931–1950)

== Sources ==
- Craig, F. W. S. (1983) [1969]. British parliamentary election results 1918-1949 (3rd ed.). Chichester: Parliamentary Research Services. ISBN 0-900178-06-X.
- Leigh Rayment's Historical List of MPs
