= 1938 Combined Scottish Universities by-election =

1938 UK Parliamentary by-election

- 21–25 February 1938

Constituency of Combined Scottish Universities
- Turnout: 52.1% (▼2.7%)
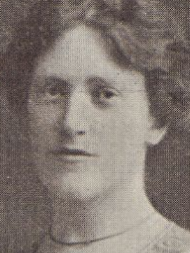

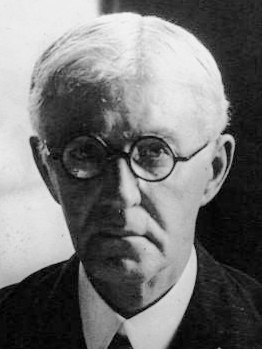
	First party	Second party
Candidate	John Anderson	Frances Melville
Party	National	Independent
Popular vote	14,042	5,618
Percentage	48.8%	19.5%
Swing	▼7.7%	New
	Third party	Fourth party
	SNP
Candidate	Andrew Dewar Gibb	Peter Chalmers Mitchell
Party	SNP	Independent Progressive
Popular vote	5,246	3,868
Percentage	18.2%	13.5%
Swing	▼12.9%	New
MP before election
Ramsay MacDonald
National Labour
Elected MP
John Anderson
National

The 1938 Combined Scottish Universities by-election was a by-election held from 21 to 25 February 1938 for the Combined Scottish Universities, a university constituency of the British House of Commons.

== Vacancy ==
The seat had become vacant when the National Labour Member of Parliament (MP) (and former Prime Minister), Ramsay MacDonald had died on 9 November 1937, aged 71. He had held the seat since the by-election in 1936, having held several other seats since he was first elected to Parliament at the 1906 general election.

== Candidates ==
The parties in the National Government did not usually stand candidates against each other, and since in this case the seat was held by National Labour, there was no Unionist or Liberal National candidate.

The National Government supported a "National" candidate Sir John Anderson, a former civil servant who had been Governor of Bengal from 1932 to 1937.

The Scottish National Party candidate was Andrew Dewar Gibb, the Regius Professor of Law at Glasgow University who had also contested the by-election in 1936. Two other candidates stood as independents.

== Result ==
The result was a victory for Anderson (the National candidate), who won nearly 50% of the votes, the remainder being quite evenly between the other candidates. He held the seat until the university constituencies were abolished for the 1950 general election.

Combined Scottish Universities by-election, 21-25 February 1938
Party	Candidate	Votes	%	±%
National	John Anderson	14,042	48.8	−7.7
Independent	Frances Melville	5,618	19.5	New
SNP	Andrew Dewar Gibb	5,246	18.2	−12.9
Independent Progressive	Peter Chalmers Mitchell	3,868	13.5	New
Majority		8,424	29.3	−8.1
Turnout		29,134	52.1	−2.7
National hold		Swing		

== See also ==
- Combined Scottish Universities (UK Parliament constituency)
- 1927 Combined Scottish Universities by-election
- 1934 Combined Scottish Universities by-election
- 1935 Combined Scottish Universities by-election
- 1936 Combined Scottish Universities by-election
- 1945 Combined Scottish Universities by-election
- 1946 Combined Scottish Universities by-election
- List of United Kingdom by-elections (1931–1950)

== Sources ==
- Craig, F. W. S. (1983) [1969]. British parliamentary election results 1918-1949 (3rd ed.). Chichester: Parliamentary Research Services. ISBN 0-900178-06-X.
- Leigh Rayment's Historical List of MPs
