= To-day and To-morrow =

Essay series published 1923 to 1931

To-day and To-morrow (sometimes written Today and Tomorrow) was a series of 110 speculative essays published as short books by the London publishers Kegan Paul between 1923 and 1931 (and published in the United States by E. P. Dutton, New York). As Fredric Warburg proudly recalled in 1959:

It was a unique publishing event. Many now distinguished personages made their debut in this series or contributed an early work.

== Content and reception ==
The series was one of several series initiated at Kegan Paul by C. K. Ogden. The first essay to appear, in November 1923, was J. B. S. Haldane's Daedalus; or, Science and the Future, an extended version of a lecture to the Heretics Society at Cambridge University on 4 February 1923.

In 1926 Evelyn Waugh offered to provide a book in the series to be called Noah; or the Future of Intoxication. Though completed in 1927, Waugh's manuscript was rejected for the series and never appeared.

=== Influence on fiction ===
Brian Stableford noted that the To-day and To-morrow series provided "an important stimulus to the discussion of future possibilities among the British intelligensia", and hence an increased interest in fiction extrapolating the ideas the series discussed. The work of J. B. S. Haldane and J. D. Bernal in the series influenced later science fiction writers like Olaf Stapledon. Many of the contributors to the To-day and To-morrow series had either written science fiction before (Winifred Holtby, Muriel Jaeger) or would write it after contributing pamphlets to the series (Gerald Heard, J. Leslie Mitchell, John Gloag).
