= 1946 Combined Scottish Universities by-election =

UK parliamentary by-election

- 22–27 November 1946

Constituency of Combined Scottish Universities
- Turnout: 50.7% (▼0.9%)
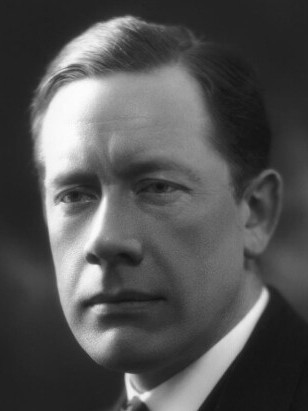
	First party	Second party	Third party
		Lab	Lib
Candidate	Walter Elliot	C. E. M. Joad	John Bannerman
Party	Unionist	Labour	Liberal
Popular vote	22,152	3,731	2,593
Percentage	68.2%	11.5%	8.0%
	Fourth party	Fifth party
	Ind.	LNP
Candidate	J. G. Jameson	R. S. Stevenson
Party	Independent	Liberal National
Popular vote	2,080	1,938
Percentage	6.4%	5.9%
MP before election
John Boyd Orr
Independent
Subsequent MP
Walter Elliot
Unionist

The 1946 Combined Scottish Universities by-election was a by-election held from 22 to 27 November 1946 for the Combined Scottish Universities, a university constituency of the British House of Commons.

It was the last election for a university constituency of the UK Parliament; the Combined Scottish Universities was abolished along with the other university seats for the 1950 general election.

== Vacancy ==
The seat had become vacant on 16 October 1946 when the independent Member of Parliament (MP) Sir John Boyd Orr had resigned by the procedural device of accepting the post of Steward and Bailiff of the Chiltern Hundreds, a notional 'office of profit under the crown' which is used as a procedural device to enable MPs to resign from the Commons. After his resignation, Boyd took up the position of Director-General of the United Nations Food and Agriculture Organization. He had held the seat he was first elected at a by-election in 1945.

== Candidates ==
Five candidates contested the by-election, none of whom had stood in 1945.

The Unionist candidate was Walter Elliot, who had been MP for Glasgow Kelvingrove for more than 20 years, until his narrow defeat at the 1945 general election. He had been Secretary of State for Scotland from 1936 to 1938.

The Labour Party candidate was the philosopher and broadcaster C. E. M. Joad. The Liberal Party fielded J. M. Bannerman, who had contested Argyll in 1945, and the Liberal National Party nominated Dr R. S. Stevenson, who had stood in West Fife in 1945.

The fifth candidate was J. G. Jameson, a member of the Federal Union who stood as an advocate of the policies of the Federal Union, although the union did not endorse his candidacy.

== Result ==
The result was a clear victory for the Unionist candidate, Walter Elliot, who won over 68% of the votes, and a majority of more than 50% over the second-placed Labour candidate. Elliot held the seat until the university constituencies were abolished for the 1950 general election.

Combined Scottish Universities by-election, 22-27 November 1946
Party	Candidate	Votes	%	±%
Unionist	Walter Elliot	22,152	68.2	+64.0
Labour	C. E. M. Joad	3,731	11.5	+2.8
Liberal	John Bannerman	2,593	8.0	+2.3
Independent	J. G. Jameson	2,080	6.4	N/A
Liberal National	R. S. Stevenson	1,938	5.9	N/A
Majority		18,421	56.7	N/A
Turnout		32,494	50.7	−0.9
Unionist gain from National		Swing		

== See also ==
- Combined Scottish Universities (UK Parliament constituency)
- 1927 Combined Scottish Universities by-election
- 1934 Combined Scottish Universities by-election
- 1935 Combined Scottish Universities by-election
- 1936 Combined Scottish Universities by-election
- 1938 Combined Scottish Universities by-election
- 1945 Combined Scottish Universities by-election
- List of United Kingdom by-elections (1931–1950)

== Sources ==
- Craig, F. W. S. (1983) [1969]. British parliamentary election results 1918-1949 (3rd ed.). Chichester: Parliamentary Research Services. ISBN 0-900178-06-X.
- Leigh Rayment's Historical List of MPs
- Tony Judge, Radio Philosopher - The Radical Life of Cyril Joad (Charleston SC Alphahouse Books 2012)) ISBN 9781469957128
