= 1936 Combined Scottish Universities by-election =

UK Parliamentary by-election

- 27–31 January 1936

Combined Scottish Universities constituency
- Turnout: 54.8% (▲3.6%)
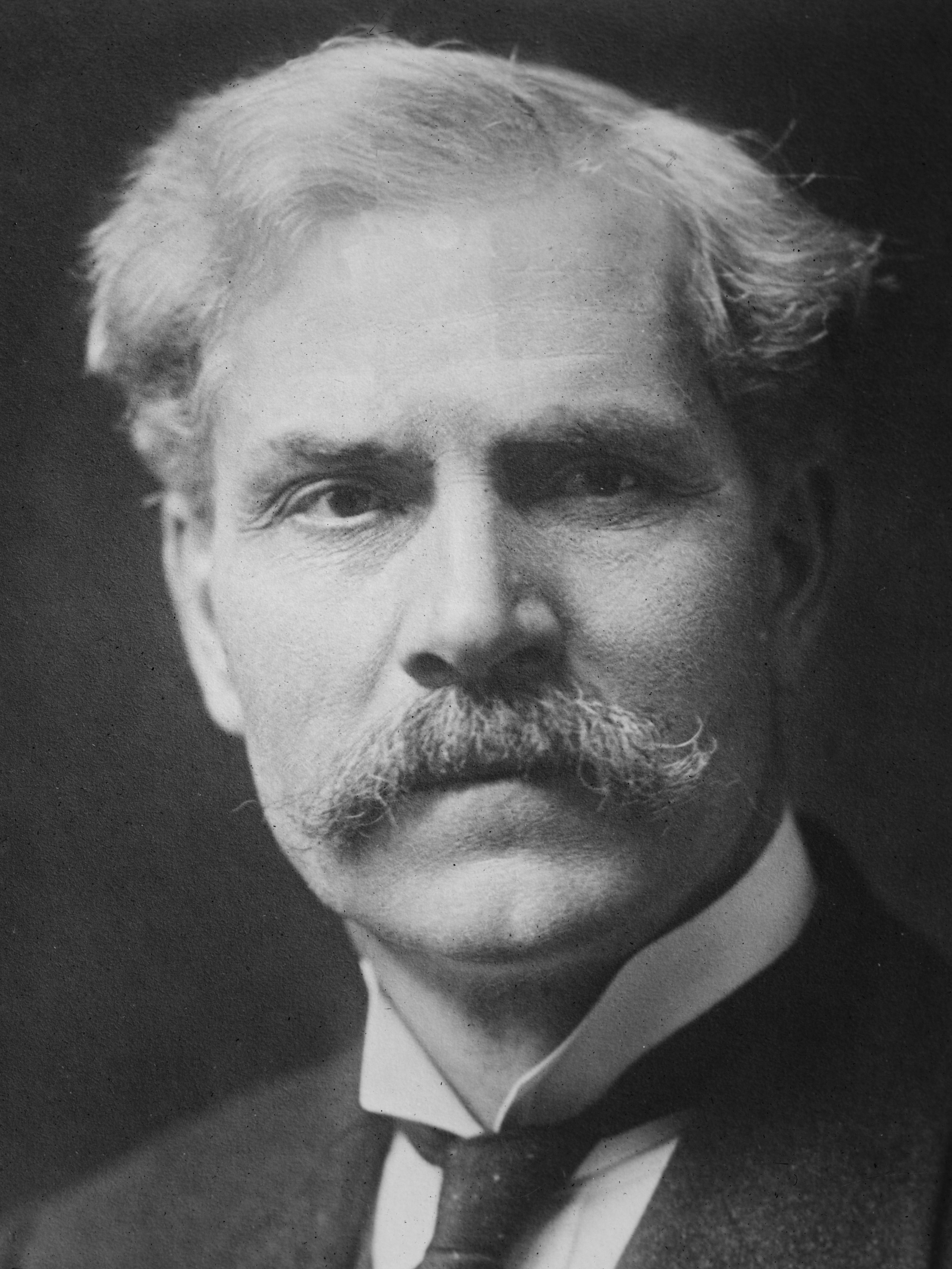

	First party	Second party	Third party
Candidate	Ramsay MacDonald	Andrew Dewar Gibb	David Cleghorn Thomson
Party	National Labour	SNP	Labour
Popular vote	16,393	9,034	3,597
Percentage	56.5%	31.1%	12.4%
Swing	N/A	▲16.9%	N/A
MP before election
Noel Skelton
Unionist
Elected MP
Ramsay MacDonald
National Labour

The 1936 Combined Scottish Universities by-election was a by-election held from 27 to 31 January 1936 for the Combined Scottish Universities, a university constituency of the British House of Commons.

== Vacancy ==
The seat had become vacant when the Unionist Member of Parliament (MP) Noel Skelton had died at the age of 55 on 22 November 1935, 3 days before being returned posthumously at the 1935 general election. A lawyer, journalist and Conservative intellectual, he had held the seat since being elected unopposed at the 1931 general election.

== Candidates ==
The Unionists and their Conservative allies were the dominant group in the National Government, whose parties did not usually stand candidates against each other. A by-election in a Unionist-held seat would therefore normally have been contested by a Unionist candidate, but in this case there was a need to find a seat for Ramsay MacDonald of National Labour, who had been defeated in his Seaham constituency at the 1935 general election. He had led the National Government from 1931 to 1935 and remained Lord President of the Council, so the other government parties agreed that he should contest this by-election, the first since the general election.

The Labour Party, which formed the official opposition at Westminster, fielded David Cleghorn Thomson. As a Liberal candidate, Thomson had contested Willesden West in 1923 and Edinburgh South in 1924. After joining Labour, he stood as the Labour candidate in Leith in 1935.

The third candidate was Andrew Dewar Gibb, of the Scottish National Party. Gibb, who was Regius Professor of Law at Glasgow University, had also contested the seat in the 1935 general election.

== Result ==
The result was a clear victory for MacDonald, who won over 56% of the votes. However his physical and mental health collapsed later in the year, exacerbated by the death of King George V a week before polling; a sea voyage was recommended to restore his health, and he died at sea in November 1937, triggering another by-election.

Combined Scottish Universities by-election, 27–31 January 1936
Party	Candidate	Votes	%	±%
National Labour	Ramsay MacDonald	16,393	56.5	N/A
SNP	Andrew Dewar Gibb	9,034	31.1	+16.9
Labour	David Cleghorn Thomson	3,597	12.4	N/A
Majority		7,359	37.4	N/A
Turnout		29,024	54.8	+3.6
National Labour gain from Unionist		Swing		

== See also ==
- Combined Scottish Universities (UK Parliament constituency)
- 1927 Combined Scottish Universities by-election
- 1934 Combined Scottish Universities by-election
- 1935 Combined Scottish Universities by-election
- 1938 Combined Scottish Universities by-election
- 1945 Combined Scottish Universities by-election
- 1946 Combined Scottish Universities by-election
- List of United Kingdom by-elections (1931–1950)

== Sources ==
- Craig, F. W. S. (1983) [1969]. British parliamentary election results 1918-1949 (3rd ed.). Chichester: Parliamentary Research Services. ISBN 0-900178-06-X.
- Leigh Rayment's Historical List of MPs
