= Andrew Dewar Gibb =

British academic and politician

Andrew Dewar Gibb QC

Leader of the Scottish National Party
- In office 1936–1940
- Preceded by: Alexander MacEwen
- Succeeded by: William Power

Personal details
- Born: 13 February 1888 Paisley, Scotland
- Died: 24 January 1974 (aged 85) Glasgow, Scotland
- Party: Scottish National Party
- Other political affiliations: Unionist Party; Scottish Party
- Spouse: Margaret Downie (m. 1923–1974)
- Children: 3
- Education: University of Glasgow; University of Cambridge
- Profession: Advocate, Barrister, Professor (Law)

Military service
- Allegiance: United Kingdom
- Branch/service: British Army
- Years of service: 1914–1917
- Rank: Major
- Battles/wars: First World War; • Western Front

Andrew Dewar Gibb MBE QC (13 February 1888 – 24 January 1974) was a Scottish advocate, barrister, professor and politician. He taught law at Edinburgh and Cambridge, and was Regius Professor of Law at the University of Glasgow 1934–1958. Gibb was the leader of the Scottish National Party (SNP) from 1936 to 1940.

== Early life and career ==
Born in Paisley, the son of William Fletcher Gibb, a doctor, Gibb was educated at Paisley Grammar School, Homefield Preparatory School, Trinity College, Glenalmond, and the University of Glasgow, where he graduated with an MA in 1910 and an LLB in 1913.

Following graduation, Gibb was called to the Scottish bar in 1914. During World War I he served in France with the 6th Battalion of the Royal Scots Fusiliers, achieving the rank of major. He also served as an adjutant to Winston Churchill during the short period in 1916 when Churchill was the battalion's commanding officer. Gibb became a member of the English bar in 1917 and practised as a barrister in England. In 1929 he was appointed as lecturer in English law at the University of Edinburgh, and from 1931 to 1934 he was lecturer in Scots law at the University of Cambridge.

In 1934, Gibb was appointed Regius Professor of Law at the University of Glasgow, and from 1937 to 1939 and 1945 to 1947 was Dean of the university's Law Faculty. As a legal scholar he edited a range of works, including successive editions of a text on the law of maritime collisions, and on the position of Scots law in the United Kingdom. His Students' Glossary of Legal Terms was published in 1946, and four editions of his Preface to Scots Law were published between 1944 and 1964. In 1947, he became a King's Counsel, and from 1955 to 1957 he was the chairman of the Saltire Society. Gibb retired from his professorship in 1958, and was awarded an honorary Doctor of laws degree by the university the following year.

== Political career ==
Andrew Dewar Gibb was politically active throughout his adult life. He began his political career in the 1920s as a supporter of the Unionist Party, and stood unsuccessfully as a Unionist parliamentary candidate for Hamilton in 1924, and for Greenock in 1929.

During the 1920s, Gibb came to the view that Scotland had been ill-served by the union of 1707. His book Scotland in Eclipse (1930) linked the economic depression with a wider cultural malaise in Scotland. In particular, he believed that Scotland's status as a partner in the imperial mission had been compromised by her lowly status in the United Kingdom. While he moved towards a Scottish nationalist position, he also retained a right-wing world view, and imperial questions remained prominent in his writings.

Gibb's involvement in Scottish nationalism came initially as a member of the Scottish Party, which had been founded as a counterbalance to the left-wing National Party of Scotland. In 1934, he became a founder member of the Scottish National Party (SNP), and was the second leader of the SNP, serving from 1936 until 1940. Gibb stood as an independent for the Combined Scottish Universities constituency in the 1935 general election, and as an SNP parliamentary candidate in the 1936 Combined Scottish Universities by-election, taking 31.1% of the vote and second place in the poll. However, he was less successful at the 1938 by-election, his share falling to 18.2%. Gibb resigned as leader of the SNP in 1940, due to what he regarded as its rapid lurch to the left. By 1947 he was considering returning to the Unionist Party, and possibly running for Parliament once more under their banner.

Gibb died at his home in Glasgow in 1974, aged 85. Married to Margaret Isabel Downie in 1923, the couple had a son and two daughters.

== Publications ==
- With Winston Churchill at the Front, 1924
- Sale of Goods on CIF and FOB Terms: A Guide to the Decisions, 1924
- The International Law of Jurisdiction in Scotland and England, 1926
- International Private Law of Scotland in the 16th and 17th Centuries, 1928
- Scotland in Eclipse, 1930
- The Trial of Motor Car Accident Cases, 1930
- Select Cases in the Law of Scotland, 1933
- Scottish Empire, 1937
- A Preface to Scots Law, 1944
- Student's Glossary of Legal Terms, 1946
- Law from over the Border: A Short Account of a Strange Jurisdiction, 1950
- Scotland Resurgent, 1950
- Perjury Unlimited: A Monograph on Nuremberg, 1954
- Fragmenta Legis, 1955
- Judicial Corruption in the United Kingdom, 1957

Academic offices
| Preceded by William Gloag | Regius Professor of Law; 1934–1958 | Succeeded by David Maxwell Walker |
Party political offices
| Preceded by Alexander MacEwen | Chairman (Leader) of the Scottish National Party; 1936–1940 | Succeeded by William Power |
