= Scotland constituency election results in the 1929 United Kingdom general election =

33rd Parliament	(1923)
34th Parliament	(1924)
35th Parliament	(1929)
36th Parliament	(1931)
37th Parliament	(1935)

Results of the election by constituency

This is a complete alphabetical list of election results from constituencies in Scotland to the 35th Parliament of the United Kingdom at the 1929 general election, held on 30 May 1929.

== Scotland ==
- Change in % vote and swing is calculated between the winner and second place and their respective performances at the 1924 election. A plus denotes a swing to the winner and a minus against the winner.

Constituency	County	Region	Last election	Winning party				Turnout (Note: Excludes spoilt ballots)	Votes								
Constituency	County	Region	Last election	Party	Votes	Share	Majority	Turnout	Labour (Note: Includes Labour Party and allied Co-operative Party)		Unionist (Note: Excludes Speaker)		Liberal		Other (Note: Includes all other parties, all independent candidates and the Speaker)		Total
Constituency	County	Region	Last election	Party	Votes	Share	Majority	Turnout	#	%	#	%	#	%	#	%	Total
Aberdeenshire Central			Uni	Uni	10,773	43.6	1,233	63.0	4,357	17.7	10,773	43.6	9,540	38.7			
Aberdeenshire East			Uni	Uni	13,354	56.9	3,244		10,110	43.1	13,354	56.9					
Aberdeenshire West & Kincardine			Uni	Lib	9,839	51.8	668	66.3			9,171	48.2	9,839	51.8			
Aberdeen North			Lab	Lab	17,826	60.8	8,027		17,826	60.8			9,799	33.4	1,686	5.8	
Aberdeen South			Uni	Uni	21,548	60.8	7,680	67.2	13,868	39.2	21,548	60.8					
Argyllshire			Uni	Uni	11,108	44.1	3,019	62.7	6,001	23.8	11,108	44.1	8,089	32.1			
Ayr Burghs			Uni	Uni	16,874	45.9	3,445	74.8	13,429	36.5	16,874	45.9	6,479	17.6			
Bute & Northern Ayrshire			Uni	Uni	18,331	56.2	4,037		14,294	43.8	18,331	56.2					
Ayrshire South			Lab	Lab	16,981	58.1	4,741		16,981	58.1	12,240	41.9					
Banffshire			Uni	Lib	9,278	44.3	2,558		4,982	23.7	6,720	32.0	9,278	44.3			
Berwick and Haddington			Uni	Lab	11,761	37.5	326		11,761	37.5	11,435	36.5	8,132	26.0			
Bothwell			Lab	Lab	17,006	55.3	4,929		17,006	55.3	12,077	39.3			1,677	5.3	
Caithness and Sutherland			Lib	Lib	13,462	73.9	10,421	66.5			3,041	16.7	13,462	73.9	1,711	9.4	
Coatbridge			Lab	Lab	16,879	55.0	7,669		16,879	55.0	9,210	30.0	4,610	15.0			
Dumbarton Burghs			Lab	Lab	19,193	63.1	7,968		19,193	63.1	11,225	36.9					
Dumfriesshire			Uni	Lib	16,174	45.1	Majority		6,687	18.7	12,984	36.2	16,174	45.1			
Dunbartonshire			Uni	Lab	18,153	45.7	1,577	81.0	18,153	45.7	16,576	41.6	5,071	12.7			
Dunfermline Burghs			Lab	Lab	15,288	58.5	6,142	74.1	15,288	58.5	9,146	35.0			1,712	6.5	
Edinburgh Central			Lab	Lab	16,762	59.0	10,017	69.3	16,762	59.0	4,889	17.2	6,745	23.8			
Edinburgh East			Lab	Lab	13,933	47.2	5,246		13,933	47.2	6,889	17.8	8,687	29.4			
Edinburgh North			Uni	Uni	13,993	39.7	2,653	73.8	11,340	32.2	13,993	39.7	9,877	28.1			
Edinburgh South			Uni	Uni	19,541	56.7	9,692		5,050	14.7	19,541	56.7	9,849	28.6			
Edinburgh West			Uni	Lab	15,795	38.6	2,829		15,795	38.6	12,966	31.7	12,126	29.7			
Fife East			Uni	Lib	14,329	42.9	581	73.3	5,350	16.0	13,748	41.1	14,329	42.9			
Fife West			Lab	Lab	17,668	60.0	11,628	69.7	17,668	60.0	5,727	19.5			6,040	20.5	
Forfarshire			Uni	Uni	8,852	42.2	1,951	70.7	5,257	25.0	8,852	42.2	6,901	32.8			
Galloway			Uni	Lib	13,461	42.4	101	80.1	4,903	15.5	13,360	42.1	13,461	42.4			
Glasgow Bridgeton			Lab	Lab	21,033	67.7	10,984		21,033	67.7	10,049	32.3					
Glasgow Camlachie			Lab	Lab	17,946	53.2	3,786		17,946	53.2	C#	C%			1,646	4.9	
Glasgow Cathcart			Uni	Uni	15,435	43.1	2,452		12,983	36.3	15,435	43.1	7,388	20.6			
Glasgow Central			Uni	Uni	18,336	50.9	673	72.0	17,663	49.1	18,336	50.9					
Glasgow Gorbals			Lab	Lab	25,134	74.8	16,677		25,134	74.8	8,457	25.2					
Glasgow Govan			Ind	Ind	17,384	57.7	4,646				12,738	42.3			17,834	57.7	
Glasgow Hillhead			Uni	Uni	17,395	63.3	7,330	74.9	10,065	36.7	17,395	63.3					
Glasgow Kelvingrove			Uni	Uni	17,031	48.9	1,858	74.9	15,173	43.6	17,031	48.9	2,623	7.5			
Glasgow Maryhill			Uni	Lab	18,311	50.6	3,389	79.8	18,311	50.6	14,922	41.2	2,955	8.2			

Glasgow Partick
Party	Candidate	Votes	%	±%
Labour	Adam McKinlay	13,110	45.5	+3.3
Unionist	George Broun-Lindsay	12,701	44.1	−13.7
Liberal	John Taylor	2,975	10.3	n/a
Majority		409	1.4	17.0
Turnout		28,786		
Labour gain from Unionist		Swing	+8.5	

Glasgow Pollok
Party	Candidate	Votes	%	±%
Unionist	John Gilmour	22,328	69.2	
Labour	Walter Muter	9,936	30.8	
Majority		12,392	38.4	
Turnout		32,264		
Unionist hold		Swing		

Glasgow Shettleston
Party	Candidate	Votes	%	±%
Labour	John Wheatley	19,594	60.4	+9.1
Unionist	Herbert James Moss	12,870	39.6	−9.1
Majority		6,724	20.8	
Turnout			76.9	−4.9
Labour hold		Swing	+9.1	

Glasgow Springburn
Party	Candidate	Votes	%	±%
Labour	George Hardie	21,079	65.5	+9.0
Unionist	John McSkimming	11,110	34.5	−9.0
Majority		9,969	31.0	+18.0
Turnout		32,189	73.6	−5.7
Labour hold		Swing	+9.0	

Glasgow St. Rollox
Party	Candidate	Votes	%	±%
Labour	James Stewart	19,445	61.8	
Unionist	A.N. Forman	11,430	36.3	n/a
Communist	George Middleton	613	1.9	n/a
Majority		8,015	25.5	
Turnout		31,488		
Labour hold		Swing	n/a	

Glasgow Tradeston
Party	Candidate	Votes	%	±%
Labour	Tom Henderson	17,864	58.7	
Unionist	Ingram Spencer	12,592	41.3	n/a
Majority		5,272	17.3	
Turnout		30,456		
Labour hold		Swing	n/a	

Greenock
Party	Candidate	Votes	%	±%
Liberal	Godfrey Collins	11,190	32.5	−16.1
Labour	William Leonard	9,697	28.2	+5.8
Communist	Alec Geddes	7,005	20.4	−8.6
Unionist	Andrew Dewar Gibb	6,517	18.9	n/a
Majority		1,493	4.3	−15.3
Turnout			78.7	+0.9
Liberal hold		Swing	-10.9	

Hamilton
Party	Candidate	Votes	%	±%
Labour	Duncan Macgregor Graham	16,595	67.1	+6.3
Unionist	Robert McLellan	7,752	31.3	−7.9
Communist	Frank Moore	395	1.6	n/a
Majority		8,843	35.8	+14.2
Turnout			72.2	−4.3
Labour hold		Swing	+7.1	

Inverness
Party	Candidate	Votes	%	±%
Liberal	Murdoch Macdonald	14,042	55.3	−7.3
Labour	David Norman Mackay	11,369	44.7	+7.3
Majority		2,673	10.6	−14.6
Turnout		25,411		
Liberal hold		Swing	-7.3	

Kilmarnock
Party	Candidate	Votes	%	±%
Labour	Robert Climie	17,368	48.2	+0.4
Unionist	Charles MacAndrew	10,939	30.4	−21.8
Liberal	James Rankin Rutherford	7,700	21.4	N/A
Majority		6,429	17.8	N/A
Turnout		36,007	77.8	−0.7
Labour gain from Unionist		Swing	+11.2	

Kinross and Western Perthshire
Party	Candidate	Votes	%	±%
Unionist	Katharine Stewart-Murray	12,245	48.6	−23.4
Liberal	George Freeland Barbour	9,128	36.2	n/a
Labour	W.D. Stewart	3,834	15.2	−12.8
Majority		3,117	12.4	−31.6
Turnout			75.5	
Unionist hold		Swing	n/a	

Kirkcaldy Burghs
Party	Candidate	Votes	%	±%
Labour	Tom Kennedy	17,410	59.6	+6.9
Unionist	Henry Scrymgeour-Wedderburn	11,805	40.4	n/a
Majority		5,605	19.2	+13.8
Turnout			72.2	−9.6
Labour hold		Swing	n/a	

Lanark
Party	Candidate	Votes	%	±%
Labour	Thomas Scott Dickson	15,054	48.7	
Unionist	Stephen Mitchell	12,652	41.0	
Liberal	James Mullo Weir	3,179	10.3	
Majority		2,402	7.8	
Turnout		30,885		
Labour gain from Unionist		Swing		

North Lanarkshire
Party	Candidate	Votes	%	±%
Labour	Jennie Lee	19,884	55.9	+9.4
Unionist	Mungo Murray	15,680	44.1	−9.4
Majority		4,204	11.8	18.8
Turnout			78.6	
Labour gain from Unionist		Swing	+9.4	

Leith
Party	Candidate	Votes	%	±%
Liberal	Ernest Brown	20,613	56.7	−2.9
Labour	Alan H. Paton	15,715	43.3	+2.9
Majority		4,898	13.5	−5.8
Turnout		36,328		
Liberal hold		Swing	-2.9	

Linlithgowshire
Party	Candidate	Votes	%	±%
Labour	Manny Shinwell	18,063	51.6	
Unionist	Adrian Baillie	11,241	32.1	
Liberal	John Fraser Orr	5,722	16.3	n/a
Majority		6,822	19.5	
Turnout		35,026		

Midlothian and Peebles Northern
Party	Candidate	Votes	%	±%
Unionist	John Colville	11,219	39.1	
Labour	Andrew Clarke	10,779	37.5	
Liberal	David Edwin Keir	6,726	23.4	n/a
Majority		440	1.6	
Turnout				
Unionist hold		Swing		

Montrose Burghs
Party	Candidate	Votes	%	±%
Liberal	Robert Hutchison	11,715	55.5	−1.7
Labour	Thomas Irwin	9,381	44.5	+1.7
Majority		2,334	11.0	−3.4
Turnout			71.3	+2.8
Liberal hold		Swing	-1.7	

Moray & Nairn
Party	Candidate	Votes	%	±%
Unionist	James Stuart	8,896	43.7	
Labour	Joseph Forbes Duncan	6,563	32.3	
Liberal	John Tennant	4,889	24.0	n/a
Majority		2,333	11.5	
Turnout		20,348	68.7	
Unionist hold		Swing		

Motherwell
Party	Candidate	Votes	%	±%
Labour	James Barr	16,650	58.0	
Unionist	John Ford	7,502	26.1	
Liberal	Henry Archibald	3,597	12.5	
Communist	Isabel Brown	984	3.4	
Majority		9,148	31.9	
Turnout			79.6	
Labour hold		Swing		

Orkney and Shetland
Party	Candidate	Votes	%	±%
Liberal	Robert William Hamilton	8,256	60.4	n/a
Unionist	Basil Neven-Spence	5,404	39.6	n/a
Majority		2,852	20.8	n/a
Turnout		13,660	43.1	n/a
Liberal hold		Swing	n/a	

Paisley
Party	Candidate	Votes	%	±%
Labour	James C. Welsh	22,425	55.8	+2.3
Liberal	James McCulloch	10,640	26.5	−20.0
Unionist	Minna Cowan	7,094	17.7	n/a
Majority		11,785	29.3	
Turnout				
Labour hold		Swing		

Peebles and Southern Midlothian
Party	Candidate	Votes	%	±%
Labour	Joseph Westwood	11,161	45.5	+4.7
Unionist	Hylton Murray-Philipson	7,736	31.5	−3.8
Liberal	James McGowan	5,648	23.0	−0.9
Majority		3,425	14.0	+8.5
Turnout			75.7	−3.1
Labour hold		Swing	+4.2	

Perth
Party	Candidate	Votes	%	±%
Unionist	Noel Skelton	14,229	40.4	−9.0
Liberal	Francis Norie-Miller	12,699	36.1	+5.7
Labour	Helen E Gault	8,291	23.5	+3.3
Majority		1,530	4.3	−14.7
Turnout			76.7	+1.4
Unionist hold		Swing	-7.4	

Renfrewshire East
Party	Candidate	Votes	%	±%
Unionist	Alexander Munro MacRobert	18,487	52.2	
Labour	John Martin Munro	16,924	47.8	
Majority		1,563	4.4	
Turnout		63,189	75.9	
Unionist hold		Swing		

Renfrewshire West
Party	Candidate	Votes	%	±%
Labour	Robert Forgan	14,419	46.5	
Unionist	Alexander Thomson Taylor	12,183	39.4	
Liberal	Francis Sheed Anderson	2,682	8.7	n/a
National (Scotland)	Roland Muirhead	1,667	5.4	n/a
Majority		2,236	7.1	
Turnout			81.6	
Labour gain from Unionist		Swing		

Ross and Cromarty
Party	Candidate	Votes	%	±%
Liberal	Ian Macpherson	9,564	58.8	n/a
Labour	Hugh Donald MacIntosh	6,710	41.2	n/a
Majority		2,854	17.6	
Turnout		16,274	55.6	n/a
Liberal hold		Swing	n/a	

Roxburgh & Selkirk
Party	Candidate	Votes	%	±%
Unionist	Walter Montagu Douglas Scott	13,510	38.0	−7.8
Liberal	Arthur Robert McDougal	12,232	34.4	+6.5
Labour	Robert Gibson	9,803	27.6	+1.4
Majority		1,278	3.6	−14.3
Turnout		35,545	78.5	
Unionist hold		Swing	-7.2	

Rutherglen
Party	Candidate	Votes	%	±%
Labour	William Wright	17,538	52.2	
Unionist	Arthur Patterson Duffes	12,249	36.5	
Liberal	James Dunlop MacDougall	2,945	8.8	
Communist	Alex Moffat	842	2.5	
Majority		5,289	15.7	
Turnout		33,574		
Labour hold		Swing		

Stirling and Falkirk
Party	Candidate	Votes	%	±%
Labour	Hugh Murnin	15,408	47.4	−6.5
Unionist	Douglas Jamieson	10,164	31.3	n/a
Independent Protestant	A Ratcliffe	6,902	21.3	n/a
Majority		5,244	16.1	+7.5
Turnout			79.1	−2.5
Labour hold		Swing	n/a	

Clackmannan and Eastern Stirlingshire
Party	Candidate	Votes	%	±%
Labour	Lauchlin MacNeill Weir	17,667	53.2	+0.6
Unionist	Harold Mitchell	8,778	26.4	n/a
Liberal	Edwin James Donaldson	6,760	20.4	−27.0
Majority		8,889	26.8	+21.6
Turnout		33,205		
Labour hold		Swing	n/a	

Stirling & Clackmannan Western
Party	Candidate	Votes	%	±%
Labour	Tom Johnston	15,179	56.7	
Unionist	Guy Dalrymple Fanshawe	11,589	43.3	
Majority		3,590	13.4	
Turnout		26,768		
Labour gain from Unionist		Swing		

Western Isles
Party	Candidate	Votes	%	±%
Liberal	Thomas Ramsay	4,877	44.1	−10.1
Labour	John McK. MacDiarmid	3,589	32.5	+15.3
Unionist	Iain MacAlisdair Moffatt-Pender	2,593	23.4	−5.2
Majority		1,288	11.6	−14.0
Turnout		11,059	40.5	+1.4
Liberal hold		Swing	-12.7	
