= Kilmarnock by-election =

Kilmarnock by-election may refer to one of three parliamentary by-elections held for the British House of Commons constituency of Kilmarnock, in Ayrshire, Scotland:

- 1929 Kilmarnock by-election
- 1933 Kilmarnock by-election
- 1946 Kilmarnock by-election

== See also ==
- Kilmarnock (UK Parliament constituency)
