= John Pollock (politician) =

Scottish political activist (1893–1955)

- Born: 1893; Kilmarnock, Scotland
- Died: 1955 (aged 61–62)
- Occupations: Politician; political activist
- Political party: Independent Labour Party

John Pollock (1893–1955) was a Scottish politician and political activist.

== Biography ==
Born in Kilmarnock in 1893, Pollock worked for many years as a boilermaker. He joined a Marxist group when he was sixteen, but soon left, and instead joined the Independent Labour Party (ILP). He worked as the election agent for Robert Climie, Labour candidate for Kilmarnock on several occasions, and as a result, he lost his job. He found employment on the buses, but was again sacked for his political work. He spent several months unemployed in 1926, but then found work as a co-operative insurance agent, and moved to Ayr.

Pollock was selected as ILP candidate for Kilmarnock at the 1931 UK general election. The Labour Party would only support those ILP candidates who signed a declaration of loyalty, which Pollock refused to do. He lost the election to the incumbent, Craigie Aitchison, then stood in the 1933 Kilmarnock by-election and the 1935 UK general election, placing third behind National Labour and Labour candidates on these occasions.

Pollock was elected as chair of the important Scottish Division of the ILP, and also won election to Ayr town council. In 1946, Jimmy Maxton, the leading personality in the ILP, died, and Pollock decided to defect to the Labour Party. At the 1950 UK general election, he stood for his new part in Ayr, but was not elected.

Pollock was active in the Union of Shop, Distributive and Allied Workers until his death, in 1955. His son, also John Pollock, became the general secretary of the Educational Institute of Scotland.
