= James Rankin Rutherford =

Scottish Liberal Party politician (1882–1967)

James Rankin Rutherford

James Rankin Rutherford CBE JP (1882 – 20 September 1967) was a Scottish Liberal Party politician. He was the Provost of Kirkintilloch 1931–33 and Convener of the County Council 1939–1945.

== Background ==
Rutherford was educated at Lenzie Academy, Dunbartonshire. In 1915 he married Helen Warren. They had two sons and two daughters. His son Sandy went on to also take an interest in local government. Rutherford was awarded the CBE in the 1945 New Year Honours.

== Political career ==
In 1918 he was elected to Kirkintilloch Town Council in Dunbartonshire. Rutherford was Liberal candidate at the 1928 Aberdeen North by-election. This was not a promising seat; there had been no Liberal candidate at the previous general election, the last Liberal candidate came third and a Liberal had not won since 1910. On top of that, the Labour candidate seeking to hold the seat was former Liberal MP, William Wedgwood Benn. He finished fourth, behind the Communist candidate. He was then Liberal candidate for the Kilmarnock division of Ayrshire at the 1929 General Election. This was a Unionist/Labour marginal seat. No Liberal had stood in 1924 but one had come second in 1923. He polled just over 21% of the vote and came third. Within a few months there was a by-election but Rutherford declined an invitation to stand. He did not stand for parliament again.

Rutherford continued to be active in municipal politics at Kirkintilloch. In 1930 he was elected to Dunbartonshire County Council. In 1931 he was appointed Provost of Kirkintilloch, serving a two-year term. By 1931 the depression was affecting Scotland, at the request of the Chancellor of the Exchequer an Economic Committee was set up and Rutherford was appointed to represent the Royal Burghs. The Committee on Local Expenditure (Scotland), also known as the Lovat Committee, reported later that year. They had looked at local expenditure and made recommendations covering: education, roads and bridges, police, housing, public assistance and public health. Rutherford continued to work with the Economic Committee, going on to look at planning and recommending in 1938 that Scotland have national planning body to assist development. In 1939 Rutherford was elected Convener of the County Council, serving for six years. He became a member of the Scottish Council on Industry, when it formed 1942.

=== Electoral record ===
By-election, Aug 1928: Aberdeen North
Party	Candidate	Votes	%	±%
Labour	William Wedgwood Benn	10,646	52.5	
Unionist	Laura Sandeman	4,696	23.1	
Communist	Aitken Ferguson	2,618	12.9	n/a
Liberal	James Rutherford	2,337	11.5	n/a
Majority		5,950		
Turnout			56.8	−7.6
Labour hold		Swing		

General Election, May 1929: Kilmarnock
Party	Candidate	Votes	%	±%
Labour	Robert Climie	17,368	48.2	+0.4
Unionist	Charles MacAndrew	10,939	30.4	−21.8
Liberal	James Rutherford	7,700	21.4	N/A
Majority		6,429	17.8	N/A
Turnout		36,007	77.8	−0.7
Labour gain from Unionist		Swing	+11.2	
