= John Lavin =

John Lavin may refer to:

- John Lavin (trade unionist)
- John Lavin (artist)
- Johnny Lavin, baseball player
