= European Leadership Network =

Pan-European think-tank

Logo

European Leadership Network (ELN) is a pan-European think-tank focusing on European foreign, defence and security issues based in London, United Kingdom.

== History and organisation ==
The ELN was founded as part of a project by the Nuclear Security Project in an effort to "help create the political space for dialogue, education and action on the vision and steps toward a world without nuclear weapons". At the end of 2013 the ELN broadened its focus and remit of work to address a much wider range of foreign and security policy challenges facing Europe.

The ELN is currently chaired by former UK Defence Secretary Des Browne. In March 2015, Lord Browne and former Russian Foreign Minister Igor Ivanov, both won the prestigious Nunn-Lugar Award for Promoting Nuclear Security, in part for their work with the European Leadership Network.

The ELN specialises in security issues.

On 27 March 2015, the Carnegie Corporation of New York announced that it was funding the European Leadership Network for 24 months, as part of its philanthropic efforts.

In 2025, the ELN was declared an undesirable organization in Russia.

== Activities ==
The ELN operates through a network of former European political, military, and diplomatic leaders and supports this network with in-house research and events. The network itself contains members not just from the EU but also Russia, Ukraine, Turkey, Georgia, Albania, Norway, and Serbia. Such a scope has as its basis a conception of a Greater Europe similar to that of the OSCE.

In 2014 the European Leadership Network has expanded to tackle broader European and global security issues, including the Ebola crisis, near-misses between Russian and Western militaries, and the expanding Russo-Chinese relationship.

A report published by the European Leadership Network in 2015, title Dangerous Brinkmanship: closer military encounters between Russia and the West in 2015 generated considerable attention around the world. At the 2015 Munich Security Conference in February 2015, conference chairman Wolfgang Ischinger, also a member of the European Leadership Network, publicly questioned Russian Foreign Minister Sergei Lavrov on the findings of the ELN report. In May 2015, 68 members of the European Leadership Members signed a global statement in support of the Nuclear Non-Proliferation Treaty ahead of its Review Conference in New York. The statement was also signed by senior figures from Latin America, the United States and Asia-Pacific.

The European Leadership Network administers the Top Level Group of UK Parliamentarians for Multilateral Nuclear Disarmament and Non-Proliferation (TLG).

== Partners ==
- Top Level Group
- Nuclear Threat Initiative

== Supporters ==
- Carnegie Corporation of New York
- Nuclear Threat Initiative
- Ploughshares Fund
- Joseph Rowntree Charitable Trust (JRCT)
- Polden-Puckham Charitable Foundation (PPCF)
- The William and Flora Hewlett Foundation
