= 1959 Dissolution Honours =

British government recognitions

The 1959 Dissolution Honours List was issued on 19 September 1959 to mark the dissolution of the United Kingdom parliament prior to the 1959 general election.

The recipients of honours are displayed here as they were styled before their new honour.

== Hereditary Peers ==
=== Viscount ===
- Rt Hon. James Gray Stuart CH MVO MC, Unionist Member of Parliament for Moray and Nairn, 1923–1959. A Lord Commissioner of the Treasury and Scottish Unionist Whip, 1935–1941; Joint Parliamentary Secretary to the Treasury and Government, Chief Whip, 1941–1945. Secretary of State for Scotland, 1951–1957. Opposition Chief Whip, 1945–1948. Chairman of the Unionist Party in Scotland since 1950. For political and public services.

=== Baron ===
- Colonel The Rt Hon. Sir Charles Glen MacAndrew TD, Unionist Member of Parliament for Kilmarnock, 1924–1929; for the Partick Division of Glasgow, 1931-1935 and for Bute and North Ayrshire, 1935–1959. Chairman of Ways and Means, 1951–1959. For political and public services.

== Life Peers ==
=== Baroness ===
- Rt Hon. Dame Florence Gertrude Horsbrugh GBE, Unionist Member of Parliament for Dundee, 1931-1945 and for the Moss Side Division of Manchester, 1950–1959. Parliamentary Secretary to the Ministry of Health, 1939-1945 and to the Ministry of Food, 1945. Minister of Education, 1951–1954. For political and public services.

=== Baron ===
- Rt Hon. Herbert Stanley Morrison CH, Labour Member of Parliament for South Hackney, 1923–1924, 1929-1931 and 1935–1945; for East Lewisham, 1945-1950 and for South Lewisham, 1950–1959. Minister of Transport, 1929–1931; Minister of Supply, 1940; Secretary of State for the Home Department and Minister of Home Security, 1940–1945; Member of the War Cabinet, 1942–1945. Lord President of the Council and Leader of the House of Commons, 1945–1951; Secretary of State for Foreign Affairs, 1951. Deputy Leader of the Opposition, 1951–1955. For political and public services.
