= Clarice Shaw =

UK politician

Member of Parliament for Kilmarnock
- In office 5 July 1945 – 27 October 1946
- Prime Minister: Clement Attlee
- Preceded by: Kenneth Lindsay
- Succeeded by: William Ross

Personal details
- Born: Clarice Marion McNab; 22 October 1883 Leith, near Edinburgh, Scotland
- Died: 27 October 1946 (aged 63) Troon, Scotland
- Party: Labour

Clarice Marion Shaw (née McNab; 22 October 1883 – 27 October 1946) was a Labour Party politician and Member of Parliament in the United Kingdom.

== Early life ==
Shaw grew up in a multi-generational household in Leith. She left school at fourteen and for nine years worked as a typist before becoming a Labour councillor on Leith School Board and later to its Town Council.

in 1918 she married Ben Shaw, the Scottish organiser for the Labour Party and moved to Ayrshire.

== Political career ==
In 1916 she was the only woman Labour councillor in Scotland and at that time she expressed the view that if there were more women councillors then issues like child welfare and infant mortality would receive more attention.

She stood as a parliamentary candidate for Rutherglen in the 1919 General Election-alongside other women, Helen Crawfurd and Agnes Dollan.

She opposed to conscription in WW1 and was national secretary of the Socialist Sunday Schools Association. Following her move to Ayrshire she was elected (top of the poll) to the Ayrshire Education Authority in the late 1920s.

Shaw was elected and sworn in as MP for Ayrshire & Bute, Kilmarnock at the 1945 general election. Almost immediately she fell seriously ill and was unable to make her maiden speech. She continued with constituency duties but died shortly after she resigned on 2 October 1946.

== Death ==
She died on 27 October 1946 at 36 Titchfield Road, Troon, and was buried at Troon. At the by-election which followed a young recently demobbed Major Willie Ross was elected MP in her place.

Parliament of the United Kingdom
Preceded by Kenneth Lindsay	Member of Parliament for Kilmarnock; 1945–1946	Succeeded by William Ross
