= Des Browne =

British politician (born 1952)

The Right Honourable The Lord Browne of Ladyton PC
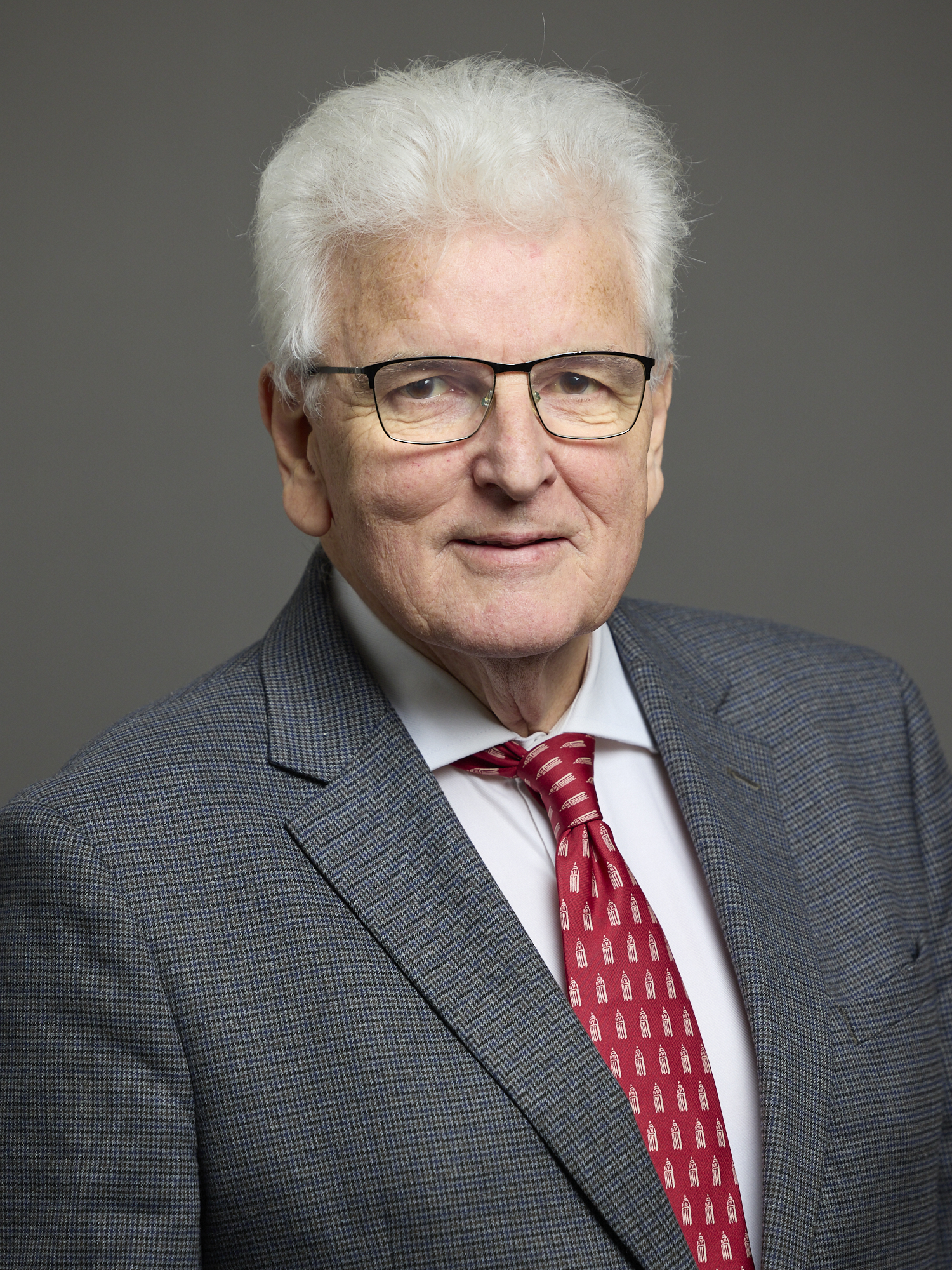
- Official portrait, 2025

Secretary of State for Scotland
- In office 28 June 2007 – 3 October 2008
- Prime Minister: Gordon Brown
- Preceded by: Douglas Alexander
- Succeeded by: Jim Murphy

Secretary of State for Defence
- In office 5 May 2006 – 3 October 2008
- Prime Minister: Tony Blair; Gordon Brown
- Preceded by: John Reid
- Succeeded by: John Hutton

Chief Secretary to the Treasury
- In office 6 May 2005 – 5 May 2006
- Prime Minister: Tony Blair
- Chancellor: Gordon Brown
- Preceded by: Paul Boateng
- Succeeded by: Stephen Timms
Junior ministerial offices
Minister of State for Immigration, Citizenship and Counterterrorism
In office 1 April 2004 – 6 May 2005
Prime Minister	Tony Blair
Preceded by	Beverley Hughes
Succeeded by	Tony McNulty
Minister of State for Work
In office 13 June 2003 – 1 April 2004
Prime Minister	Tony Blair
Preceded by	Nick Brown
Succeeded by	Jane Kennedy
Parliamentary Under-Secretary of State for Northern Ireland
In office 11 June 2001 – 13 June 2003
Prime Minister	Tony Blair
Preceded by	George Howarth
Succeeded by	John Spellar
Parliamentary offices
Member of the House of Lords
Lord Temporal
Life peerage 22 July 2010 – 23 February 2026
Member of Parliament for Kilmarnock and Loudoun
In office 1 May 1997 – 12 April 2010
Preceded by	William McKelvey
Succeeded by	Cathy Jamieson

Personal details
- Born: 22 March 1952 (age 74) Stevenston, Scotland
- Party: Scottish Labour
- Education: University of Glasgow

Desmond Henry Browne, Baron Browne of Ladyton, PC (born 22 March 1952) is a Scottish politician who served in the Cabinet of the United Kingdom under Tony Blair and Gordon Brown as Secretary of State for Defence 2006 to 2008 and Secretary of State for Scotland from 2007 to 2008. A member of the Labour Party, he was Member of Parliament (MP) for Kilmarnock and Loudoun from 1997 to 2010.

== Early life and education ==
Browne was born in Boglemart, Stevenston, North Ayrshire, lived in Stevenston for the early part of his life, and was educated at the Catholic St Michael's Academy in Kilwinning and later at the University of Glasgow, where he received a degree in law.

== Legal career ==
He started his legal career in 1974 as an apprentice solicitor with the firm James Campbell & Co. On qualifying in 1976 he became an assistant solicitor with Ross, Harper and Murphy, and was promoted to partner in 1980. He became a partner in McCluskey Browne in 1985, and was a council member of the Law Society of Scotland from 1988 to 1992. He was admitted as an advocate in 1993, practising at the Scottish bar until 1997. He worked mainly in child law.

== Parliamentary career ==
Browne contested the parliamentary seat of Argyll and Bute at the 1992 general election, and finished in fourth place behind the sitting Liberal Democrat MP Ray Michie. He was elected to the Faculty of Advocates in 1993. Browne was selected to contest the safe Labour seat of Kilmarnock and Loudoun following the retirement of the sitting MP William McKelvey. Browne won the seat at the 1997 general election with a majority of 7,256. He made his maiden speech on 20 June 1997.

Browne joined the Northern Ireland Affairs Select Committee on his election, and became the Parliamentary Private Secretary (PPS) to the Secretary of State for Scotland Donald Dewar in 1998. After Dewar left the Cabinet in 1999, to seek election as the First Minister of Scotland, Browne remained in post as PPS to the new Secretary of State John Reid. In 2000 he became the PPS to the Minister of State at the Northern Ireland Office.

On 27 November 2009, Browne announced his intention not to seek election in the 2010 general election.

== Government minister ==
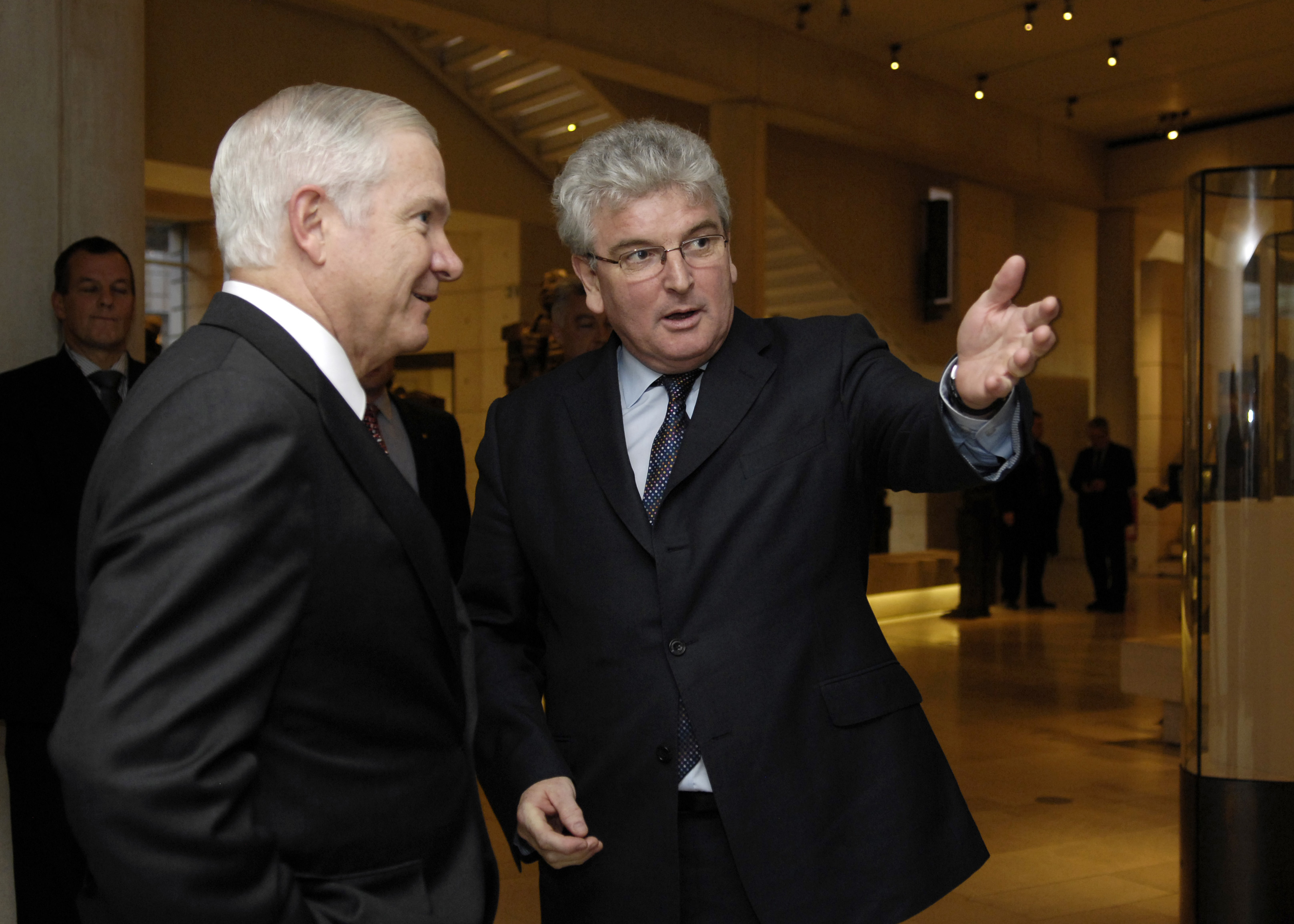
Browne meeting Robert Gates in Edinburgh during December 2007

After the 2001 general election Browne entered Tony Blair's government as the Parliamentary Under Secretary of State at the Northern Ireland Office. He was promoted to Minister of State for Work in 2003, before moving to the Home Office in 2004 as the minister with responsibility for immigration. He joined the Cabinet following the 2005 general election as the Chief Secretary to the Treasury, and became a member of the Privy Council.

Browne was appointed Secretary of State for Defence on 5 May 2006. An advocate of the UK Trident programme, in 2007 he successfully persuaded Parliament to vote to replace Trident. He came under criticism, however, after allowing the Royal Navy personnel captured by Iran in spring 2007 to sell and publish their stories. Under Blair's premiership, Browne was considered a supporter of the Chancellor of the Exchequer Gordon Brown. He received the additional responsibilities of Secretary of State for Scotland in June 2007 after Brown became prime minister.

In a free parliamentary vote on 20 May 2008, Browne voted for cutting the upper limit for abortions from 24 to 12 weeks, along with two other Catholic cabinet ministers, Ruth Kelly and Paul Murphy. He returned to the backbenches in October 2008 following a cabinet reshuffle.

Browne gave evidence to the Iraq Inquiry on 25 January 2010.

He was created a life peer on 22 July 2010, taking the title Baron Browne of Ladyton, of Ladyton in Ayrshire and Arran.

He is a Fellow Commoner of St Catharine's College, Cambridge.

== Activities after leaving government ==
Browne is vice chairman of the Washington, DC–based Nuclear Threat Initiative, a non-profit, nonpartisan organisation founded in 2001 by former U.S. Senator Sam Nunn, who serves as co-chair and CEO, and CNN founder and philanthropist Ted Turner. NTI's mission is to strengthen global security by reducing the risk of use and preventing the spread of nuclear, biological and chemical weapons.

Browne is convener of the European Leadership Network for Multilateral Nuclear Disarmament and Non-proliferation. and he is also convenor of the Top Level Group of UK Parliamentarians for Multilateral Nuclear Disarmament and Non-proliferation, established in October 2009.

He is a signatory of Global Zero, a non-profit international initiative for the elimination of all nuclear weapons worldwide.

=== Controversy over appointment as envoy to Sri Lanka ===
In February 2009, Browne was appointed by PM Brown as the government's special envoy to Sri Lanka. However, the government of Mahinda Rajapaksa, fighting the LTTE rebel group, rejected Browne's appointment, stating that the British government made the appointment unilaterally, without consultation with the Sri Lankan government.

Parliament of the United Kingdom
Preceded by William McKelvey	Member of Parliament for Kilmarnock and Loudoun; 1997–2010	Succeeded by Cathy Jamieson
Political offices
Preceded by Beverley Hughes	Minister of State for Immigration, Citizenship and Counterterrorism; 2004–2005	Succeeded by Tony McNulty as Minister of State for Immigration, Citizenship and Nationality
Preceded by Paul Boateng	Chief Secretary to the Treasury; 2005–2006	Succeeded by Stephen Timms
Preceded by John Reid	Secretary of State for Defence; 2006–2008	Succeeded by John Hutton
Preceded by Douglas Alexander	Secretary of State for Scotland; 2007–2008	Succeeded by Jim Murphy
Orders of precedence in the United Kingdom
Preceded by The Lord Allan of Hallam	Gentlemen; Baron Browne of Ladyton	Followed by The Lord Monks
