= Willie Ross, Baron Ross of Marnock =

Scottish politician (1911-1988)

The Right Honourable The Lord Ross of Marnock MBE PC
- Ross giving a speech during his parliamentary career

Secretary of State for Scotland
- In office 4 March 1974 – 8 April 1976
- Prime Minister: Harold Wilson
- Preceded by: Gordon Campbell
- Succeeded by: Bruce Millan
- In office 16 October 1964 – 19 June 1970
- Prime Minister: Harold Wilson
- Preceded by: Michael Noble
- Succeeded by: Gordon Campbell

Shadow Secretary of State for Scotland
- In office 19 June 1970 – 4 March 1974
- Leader: Harold Wilson
- Preceded by: Gordon Campbell
- Succeeded by: Alick Buchanan-Smith
- In office 7 December 1961 – 16 October 1964
- Leader: Hugh Gaitskell; Harold Wilson
- Preceded by: Tom Fraser
- Succeeded by: Michael Noble

Member of Parliament for Kilmarnock
- In office 5 December 1946 – 7 April 1979
- Preceded by: Clarice Shaw
- Succeeded by: William McKelvey

Personal details
- Born: 7 April 1911 Ayr, Scotland
- Died: 10 June 1988 (aged 77) Ayr, Scotland
- Party: Labour
- Spouse: Elizabeth Aitkenhead
- Children: 2
- Education: University of Glasgow
- Profession: Teacher

William Ross, Baron Ross of Marnock, MBE, PC (7 April 1911 – 10 June 1988) was the longest serving Secretary of State for Scotland, holding office from 1964–1970 and again from 1974–1976, throughout the premiership of Harold Wilson.

== Early life and military career ==
Born in Ayr, the son of a train driver, he was educated at Ayr Academy and the University of Glasgow and became a schoolteacher before World War II. He served in the Highland Light Infantry in India, Burma and Singapore and was then a major in Lord Louis Mountbatten's headquarters in Ceylon (now Sri Lanka). At one point he guarded Rudolf Hess. He became a Member of the Order of the British Empire in 1945.

== Politics ==
After unsuccessfully contesting Ayr Burghs at the 1945 general election, Ross was elected Member of Parliament for Kilmarnock in a by-election in 1946. He was Parliamentary private secretary to Hector McNeil during his tenure as Secretary of State for Scotland and in 1954 placed an amendment to the bill on the licensing of commercial television, advocating a ban on adverts on Sundays, Good Friday and Christmas Day.

After serving as Shadow Secretary of State from 1962, he became Secretary of State for Scotland in 1964 under Harold Wilson. The Conservatives were in government from 1970 to 1974, when Ross resumed his position until he lost office when Wilson resigned in 1976. During his tenure, he was responsible for the creation of the Highlands and Islands Development Board and the Scottish Development Agency, the forerunners of Highlands and Islands Enterprise and Scottish Enterprise respectively. Ross campaigned for a "No" vote in the 1975 referendum on British membership of the EEC. He was also a firm unionist, in favour of Scotland and Northern Ireland remaining in the United Kingdom, and opposed devolution. Journalist Andrew Marr has called him "a stern-faced and authoritarian Presbyterian conservative who ran the country like a personal fiefdom for Harold Wilson". Ross coined the term "Tartan Tories" to describe the members of the Scottish National Party, whom he very much disliked; he was himself nicknamed "the hammer of the Nats" for his many attacks on them. The nickname "Tartan Tories" is still used in the present day by some left-leaning critics of the SNP.

He represented Kilmarnock until the 1979 general election, when he was created a life peer as Baron Ross of Marnock, of Kilmarnock in the District of Kilmarnock and Loudoun.

Ross was occasionally depicted by newspaper cartoonists as a boy in dungarees seated on an upturned bucket, as a reference to the Scottish cartoon character Oor Wullie.

He was Lord High Commissioner to the General Assembly of the Church of Scotland from 1978 to 1980, and became Honorary President of the Scottish Football Association in 1978. He married Elizabeth Jane Elma Aitkenhead, daughter of John Aitkenhead in 1948 and the couple had two daughters. He died of cancer in 1988. Lady Ross lived to the age of 94 and died in 2018.

== Notes ==
Parliament of the United Kingdom
Preceded by Clarice Shaw	Member of Parliament for Kilmarnock; 1946–1979	Succeeded by William McKelvey
Political offices
Preceded by Michael Noble	Secretary of State for Scotland; 1964–1970	Succeeded by Gordon Campbell
Preceded by Gordon Campbell	Secretary of State for Scotland; 1974–1976	Succeeded by Bruce Millan
