= 1946 Kilmarnock by-election =

UK parliamentary by-election

The 1946 Kilmarnock by-election was a by-election held on 5 December 1946 for the UK House of Commons constituency of Kilmarnock in Ayrshire.

== Vacancy ==
The seat had become vacant on 2 October 1946 when the Labour Member of Parliament (MP), Clarice Shaw had resigned her seat. She died on 27 October at the age of 63.

Shaw had held the seat since the general election in July 1945, but ill-health had prevented her from ever attending the House of Commons.

== Candidates ==
The Labour Party candidate was 35-year-old Willie Ross, a schoolteacher before World War II who was recently demobilised from the British Army, where he had risen to the rank of Major. At the 1945 general election he had unsuccessfully contested the Ayr Burghs constituency.

The Unionist candidate was Lieutenant-Colonel George E. O. Walker, who had also been the Unionist candidate at the general election. The Scottish National Party fielded George Dott.

== Result ==
The result was a victory for Ross, who held the seat with a fractionally increased share of the vote. He held the seat until he stepped down at the 1979 general election, having been Secretary of State for Scotland for two periods totalling 8 years.

Kilmarnock by-election, 5 December 1946
| Party | Candidate | Votes | % | ±% |
|---|---|---|---|---|
| Labour | Willie Ross | 22,456 | 59.7 | +0.3 |
| Unionist | George E. O. Walker | 12,239 | 32.5 | −8.1 |
| SNP | George Dott | 2,932 | 7.8 | New |
| Majority | | 10,217 | 27.2 | +8.4 |
| Turnout | | 37,627 | 68.4 | −7.7 |
| Labour hold | | Swing | +4.2 | |

== Previous result ==
General election, July 1945: Kilmarnock
| Party | Candidate | Votes | % | ±% |
|---|---|---|---|---|
| Labour | Clarice Shaw | 23,837 | 59.4 | +26.0 |
| Unionist | G. E. O. Walker | 16,300 | 40.6 | New |
| Majority | | 7,537 | 18.8 | N/A |
| Turnout | | 40,137 | 76.1 | −2.7 |
| Labour gain from National Labour | | Swing | | |

== See also ==
- Kilmarnock (UK Parliament constituency)
- Kilmarnock
- 1929 Kilmarnock by-election
- 1933 Kilmarnock by-election
- List of United Kingdom by-elections (1931–1950)
- Elections in Scotland

== Sources ==
- Craig, F. W. S. (1983) [1969]. British parliamentary election results 1918-1949 (3rd ed.). Chichester: Parliamentary Research Services. ISBN 0-900178-06-X.
- Leigh Rayment's Historical List of MPs
