= Gordon Campbell, Baron Campbell of Croy =

British Conservative politician and diplomat (1921-2005)

The Right Honourable The Lord Campbell of Croy MC DL

Shadow Secretary of State for Scotland
- In office 4 March 1974 – 13 June 1974
- Leader: Edward Heath
- Preceded by: Willie Ross
- Succeeded by: Alick Buchanan-Smith
- In office 23 January 1969 – 19 June 1970
- Leader: Edward Heath
- Preceded by: Willie Ross

Secretary of State for Scotland
- In office 19 June 1970 – 4 March 1974
- Prime Minister: Edward Heath
- Preceded by: Willie Ross
- Succeeded by: Willie Ross

Member of Parliament for Moray and Nairn
- In office 8 October 1959 – 8 February 1974
- Preceded by: James Stuart
- Succeeded by: Winnie Ewing

Member of the House of Lords
- Lord Temporal
- Life peerage 9 January 1975 – 26 April 2005

Personal details
- Born: Gordon Thomas Calthrop Campbell; 8 June 1921 Quetta, British India
- Died: 26 April 2005 (aged 83) London, England
- Party: Conservative
- Spouse: Nicola Madan
- Children: 3
- Education: Royal Military Academy Sandhurst
- Profession: Diplomacy

Military service
- Allegiance: United Kingdom
- Branch/service: British Army
- Years of service: 1939–1947
- Rank: Major
- Unit: Royal Artillery
- Battles/wars: Second World War
- Awards: Military Cross

Gordon Thomas Calthrop Campbell, Baron Campbell of Croy, MC, PC, DL (8 June 1921 – 26 April 2005) was a British Conservative politician and diplomat.

== Biography ==
=== Early life and career ===
Campbell was born in Quetta, British India (now in Pakistan), the son of Major General James Alexander Campbell and was educated at Rockport School in Holywood, County Down, then at Wellington College before joining the Royal Artillery in 1939. He fought in the Second World War with the Royal Artillery from 1940, winning the Military Cross and Bar. Invalided out in 1947 with the honorary rank of major, he served the Foreign Office in New York and Vienna until 1957.

=== House of Commons ===
Elected to Parliament in 1959, he served as Member of Parliament for the constituency of Moray and Nairn until February 1974 when he was defeated by Winnie Ewing of the Scottish National Party. He served as a Government Whip, 1961–62; Lord Commissioner of the Treasury and Scottish Whip, 1962–63; Parliamentary Under-Secretary of State for Scotland, 1963–64. He was Opposition Spokesman on Defence, 1967–68 and a member of the Shadow Cabinet, 1969–70.

=== Secretary of State for Scotland ===
He was Secretary of State for Scotland during the whole of Edward Heath's government. During his term in office the issues of fishing and oil led to him losing his Moray coastal seat to the SNP. Government papers released under the 30 year rule reveal an attitude that may explain that loss. Papers from 1970 revealed how the Scottish Office was prepared to have a "weaker and less efficient national fleet" to enable the UK to sign up to the controversial Common Fisheries Policy. On oil in 1972 Campbell was against any move to pump oil revenues directly into the Scottish economy despite Heath asking government departments to explore such an arrangements to help revive Scotland's economy with "its own resources". Further papers from 1974 revealed how he proposed "exceptional measures" to force Shetland Islands Council to accept an oil terminal without financial benefit to the islands.

=== House of Lords ===
After being defeated by Winnie Ewing of the Scottish National Party at the February 1974 general election, Campbell was made a life peer as Baron Campbell of Croy, of Croy in the County of Nairn on 9 January 1975. He became Chairman of the Scottish Board in 1976, and was Vice President of the Advisory Committee on Pollution at Sea from 1976 to 1984.

=== Personal life ===
He married Nicola Madan, daughter of Geoffrey Spencer Madan and his wife Marjorie Noble, and had three children.

- Hon. Colin Ian Calthrop Campbell b. 1950
- Colonel Hon. Alastair James Calthrop Campbell (6 Jan 1952 – 24 Aug 2021)
- Hon. Christina Marjorie Campbell b. 1953.

The Campbell family lived at Holme Rose at Croy in the Nairn Valley. In 2019, the property was put on the market for £2.3 million.

== Arms ==
Coat of arms of Gordon Campbell, Baron Campbell of Croy
Crest Between two sprays of red roses barbed and leaved Proper and tied in base with a riband Or a lyre Sable. Escutcheon Gyronny of eight Or and Sable overall on a fess Ermine two pheons points upwards Gules. Supporters Dexter an osprey and sinister a curlew both Proper. Motto Dulce Patrie Servire

== Footnotes ==
- Torrance, David, The Scottish Secretaries (Birlinn 2006)

Parliament of the United Kingdom
Preceded by James Gray Stuart	Member of Parliament for Moray and Nairn; 1959–1974	Succeeded by Winnie Ewing
Political offices
Preceded by William Ross	Secretary of State for Scotland; 1970–1974	Succeeded by William Ross
