= Baron MacAndrew =

Barony in the Peerage of the United Kingdom

Baron MacAndrew, of the Firth of Clyde, is a title in the Peerage of the United Kingdom. It was created in 1959 for the Scottish Unionist politician Sir Charles MacAndrew. He was Chairman of Ways and Means (Deputy Speaker of the House of Commons) from 1951 to 1959. As of 2023, the title is held by his great-grandson, the fourth Baron, who succeeded his father in that year.

== Barons MacAndrew (1959) ==
- Charles Glen MacAndrew, 1st Baron MacAndrew (1888–1979)
- Colin Nevill Glen MacAndrew, 2nd Baron MacAndrew (1919–1989)
- Christopher Anthony Colin MacAndrew, 3rd Baron MacAndrew (1945–2023)
- Oliver Charles Julian MacAndrew, 4th Baron MacAndrew (b. 1983)

The heir apparent is the present holder's son, Hon. Archie Charles Wilbur MacAndrew (b. 2017).

== Line of succession ==
- Charles Glen MacAndrew, 1st Baron MacAndrew (1888–1979)
  - Colin Nevill Glen MacAndrew, 2nd Baron MacAndrew (1919–1989)
    - Christopher Anthony Colin MacAndrew, 3rd Baron MacAndrew (1945–2023)
      - Oliver Charles Julian MacAndrew, 4th Baron MacAndrew (born 1983)
        - (1) Hon. Archie Charles Wilbur MacAndrew (b. 2017)
    - (2) Hon. Nicholas Rupert MacAndrew (b. 1947)
      - (3) Robin Glen MacAndrew (b. 1978)
