= Secretary of State for Scotland =

Member of the Cabinet of the United Kingdom

- Scottish Gaelic: Rùnaire Stàite na h-Alba
- Royal Arms of His Majesty's Government in Scotland

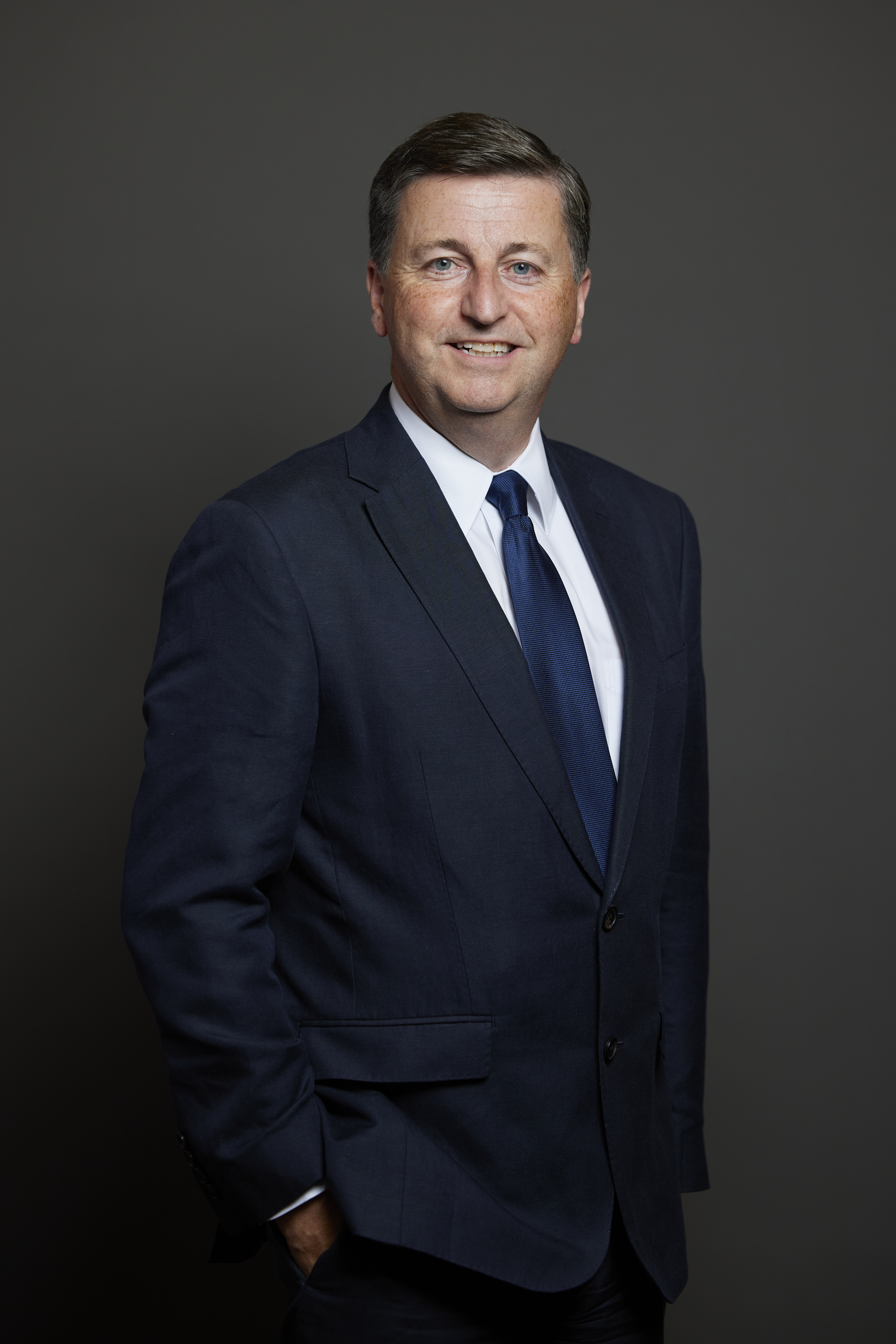
- Incumbent; Douglas Alexander since 5 September 2025
- Scotland Office
- Style: Scottish Secretary (informal); The Right Honourable (within the UK and Commonwealth)
- Type: Minister of the Crown
- Status: Secretary of State
- Member of: Cabinet; Privy Council
- Reports to: The Prime Minister
- Seat: Westminster
- Nominator: The Prime Minister
- Appointer: The Monarch; (on the advice of the Prime Minister)
- Term length: At His Majesty's pleasure
- Formation: 1 May 1707 (as Secretary of State for Scotland); 17 August 1885 (as Secretary for Scotland); 26 July 1926 (as Secretary of State for Scotland)
- Deputy: Parliamentary Under-Secretary of State for Scotland
- Salary: £159,038 per annum (2022) (including £86,584 MP salary)
- Website: gov.uk/scotland-office

The secretary of state for Scotland (Scottish Gaelic: Rùnaire Stàite na h-Alba), also referred to as the Scottish secretary, is a secretary of state in the Government of the United Kingdom, with responsibility for the Scotland Office. The incumbent is a member of the Cabinet of the United Kingdom. The Scottish secretary represent Scottish interests within the British Government, as well as advocating for British Government policies in Scotland. He is additionally responsible for partnership between the British and Scottish Governments, as well as relations between Westminster and Holyrood.

Much of the Scottish secretary's responsibility transferred to the office of the first minister of Scotland upon the establishment of a new Scottish Executive, since renamed the Scottish Government, and a new devolved Scottish Parliament in 1999, following the Scotland Act 1998.

The office holder works alongside the other Scotland Office ministers. The Scottish secretary is supported by his deputy, the parliamentary under-secretary of state for Scotland. The incumbent is Douglas Alexander, following his appointment by Prime Minister Keir Starmer in September 2025. The corresponding shadow minister is the shadow secretary of state for Scotland.

== Overview ==
=== History of office ===
==== Acts of Union, 1707 ====
The post was first created after the Acts of Union 1707 united England and Scotland into the Kingdom of Great Britain. It was abolished in 1746, following the Jacobite rising of 1745. Scottish affairs thereafter were managed by the lord advocate until 1827, when responsibility passed to the Home Office. In 1885 the post of secretary for Scotland was re-created, with the incumbent usually a member of the Cabinet. In 1926 this post was upgraded to a full secretary of state appointment by the Secretaries of State Act 1926.

==== Devolution, 1999 ====
After the 1999 Scottish devolution, the powers of the Scottish Office were divided, with most transferred to the Scottish Government or to other British government departments, leaving only a limited role for the Scotland Office. From June 2003 to October 2008, the holder of the office of secretary of state for Scotland also held another Cabinet post concurrently, leading to claims that the Scottish role was seen as a part-time ministry.

=== Functions ===
==== Reduced responsibility ====
With the advent of legislative devolution for Scotland in 1999, the role of Scottish secretary was diminished. Most of the functions vested in the office since administrative devolution in the 19th century were transferred to the newly established Scottish ministers upon the opening of the Scottish Parliament, or to other British government ministers. Many went to the first minister of Scotland as the head of the Scottish Government. Donald Dewar served as the first first minister of Scotland between 1999 and 2000, having previously served as the Scottish secretary between 1997 and 1999.

However, the Scottish secretary does represent Scotland in the Cabinet of the United Kingdom on matters that are not devolved to the Scottish Parliament, and also holds Scotland Questions on the first Wednesday of every month between 11:30 am and 12 noon, when any member of Parliament can ask a question on any matter relating to Scotland. However, devolved issues are not usually raised by MPs, as these are decided solely by Scottish Government policy, and influenced, discussed and voted on by members of the Scottish Parliament in Edinburgh. Moreover, the Scottish secretary cannot introduce any bill or legislation in the British Parliament relating to a devolved matter, under the convention that the British Government will not introduce legislation on devolved areas without the agreement of the Scottish Parliament. The secretary of state is also the group leader of the Scottish MPs from the government party.

==== Scottish Government collaboration ====
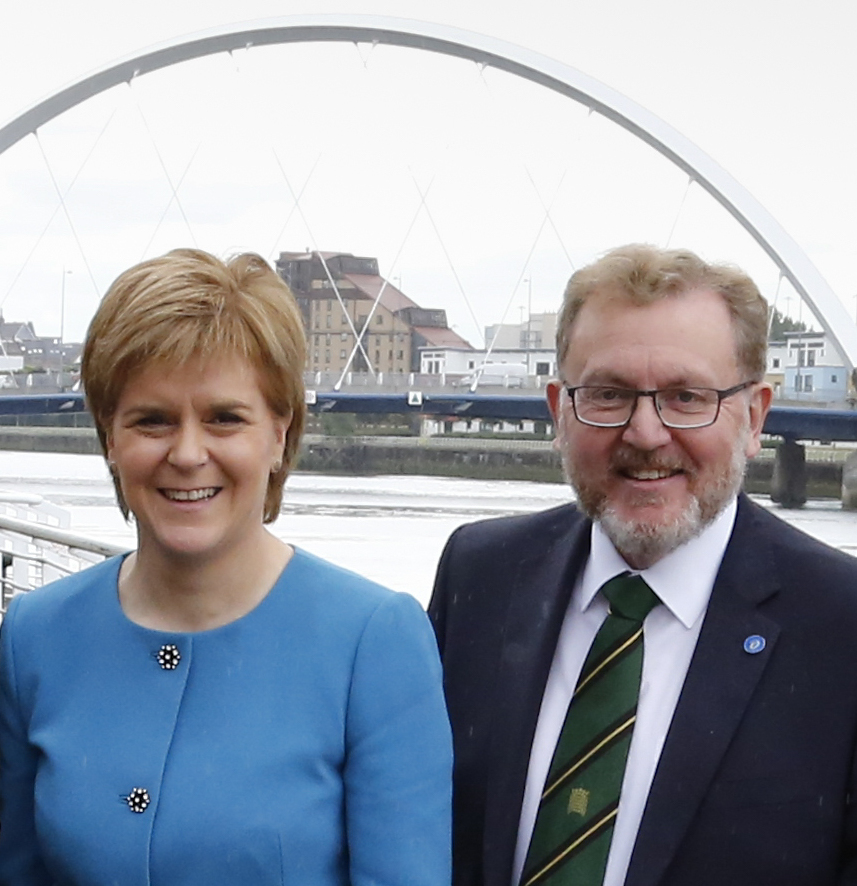
First Minister of Scotland Nicola Sturgeon and Scottish Secretary David Mundell at the 2016 British–Irish Council summit in Glasgow (Scotland)

The Scottish secretary mainly acts as a go-between for the British and Scottish governments and parliaments. However, due to the secretary's position as a minister in the British government, the convention of Cabinet collective responsibility applies, and as such the post is usually viewed as being a partisan one to promote the UK government's decision-making in Scotland, as adherence to the convention precludes doing anything else.

With the rise of the Scottish National Party (SNP) in both the Scottish Parliament and the British Parliament and the resultant interest in Scottish Independence, the secretary of state's role has also subsequently increased in prominence. The Scotland Office itself has received a cumulative increase in budget of 20% from 2013 to 2017, with a 14.4% increase in 2015/16 alone.

==== Responsibilities ====
The UK government's website lists the secretary of state for Scotland's responsibilities as being:

- The secretary of state for Scotland is the UK Government Cabinet Minister representing Scotland.
- They act as the custodian of the Scottish devolution settlement.
- They represent Scottish interests within the UK Government
- They advocate for the UK Government’s policies in Scotland.
- They also promote partnership between the UK Government and the Scottish Government, as well as relations between the UK and Scottish Parliaments.

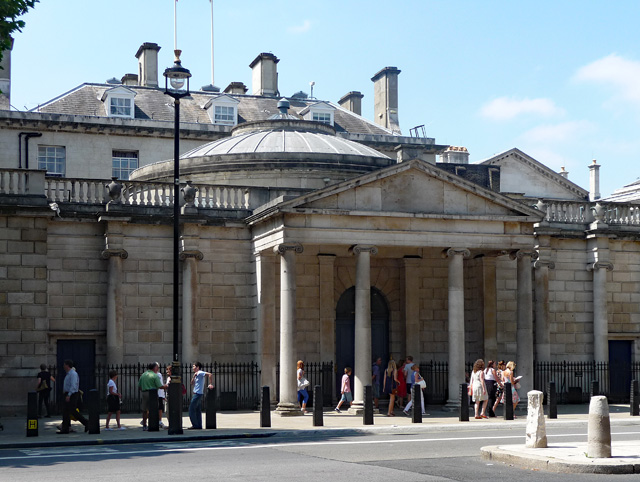
Dover House, the London headquarters of the Office of the Secretary of State for Scotland

This seeming lack of responsibility has in recent years seen calls from opposition MPs for the scrapping of the role and the Scotland Office. Robert Hazell has suggested merging the offices of secretary of state for Northern Ireland, Scotland and Wales into one secretary of state for the Union, in a department into which Rodney Brazier has suggested adding a minister of state for England with responsibility for English local government.

More broadly, the UK Government advocates that all UK Government cabinet ministers with responsibility for a territorial secretary of state position are responsible for:

- the smooth running of the devolution settlements and act as the lynchpin of the relationship between the devolved government and HM Government
- handling legislation as it affects the territory
- representing the territory’s interests in cabinet and cabinet committees
- responding to parliamentary interests in territorial affairs
- transmitting the block grant to the devolved administration
- supporting collaboration between HM Government and the devolved administration
- promoting the interests of the territory

== List of Scottish secretaries ==
=== Secretaries of state for Scotland (1707–1746) ===
John Erskine, Earl of Mar had served as Secretary of State of the independent Scotland from 1705. Following the Acts of Union 1707, he remained in office.

The post of secretary of state for Scotland existed after the Union of the Parliament of Scotland and the Parliament of England in 1707 till the Jacobite rising of 1745. After the rising, responsibility for Scotland lay primarily with the office of the home secretary, usually exercised by the lord advocate.

Secretary of State	Term of office	
John Erskine; Earl of Mar	(since 1705); 1 May 1707	3 February 1709
James Douglas; 2nd Duke of Queensberry	3 February 1709	6 July 1711
John Erskine; Earl of Mar	9 September 1713	24 September 1714
James Graham; 1st Duke of Montrose	24 September 1714	August; 1715
John Ker; 1st Duke of Roxburghe	13 December 1716	August; 1725
John Hay; 4th Marquess of Tweeddale	25 February 1742	3 January 1746

Office thereafter vacant.

=== Secretaries for Scotland (1885–1926) ===
Secretary for Scotland Act 1885 (Note: Section 1.)
- Act of Parliament
- Parliament of the United Kingdom
- Long title: An Act for appointing a Secretary for Scotland and Vice-President of the Scotch Education Department.
- Citation: 48 & 49 Vict. c. 61
- Territorial extent: United Kingdom

Dates
- Royal assent: 14 August 1885
- Commencement: 14 August 1885 (Note: The Acts of Parliament (Commencement) Act 1793.)
Other legislation
Amended by	Statute Law Revision Act 1898; Secretaries of State Act 1926; Reorganisation of Offices (Scotland) Act 1939; Education (Scotland) Act 1945; Protection of Birds Act 1954; Mental Health (Scotland) Act 1960; Statute Law Revision Act 1963; Registration of Births, Deaths and Marriages (Scotland) Act 1965; Statute Law (Repeals) Act 1973; Marriage (Scotland) Act 1977; Scotland Act 1998 (Consequential Modifications) (No.1) Order 1999

Status: Amended

Text of statute as originally enacted

Revised text of statute as amended

Text of the Secretary for Scotland Act 1885 as in force today (including any amendments) within the United Kingdom, from legislation.gov.uk.

The secretary for Scotland was chief minister in charge of the Scottish Office in the United Kingdom government. The Scottish Office was created with the post of secretary for Scotland by the Secretary for Scotland Act 1885 (48 & 49 Vict. c. 61). From 1892 the secretary for Scotland sat in cabinet. The post was upgraded to full secretary of state rank as the secretary of state for Scotland in 1926.

From 1885 to 1999, secretaries for Scotland and secretaries of state for Scotland also ex officio held the post of Keeper of the Great Seal of Scotland. From 1999, the position of keeper of the Great Seal of Scotland has been held by the first minister of Scotland.

Secretary of State	Term of office		Party	Ministry
Charles Gordon-Lennox; 6th Duke of Richmond (Note: Duke of Lennox in the peerage of Scotland)	17 August 1885	28 January 1886	Conservative	Salisbury I
George Trevelyan; MP for Hawick Burghs	8 February 1886	March; 1886	Liberal	Gladstone III
John Ramsay; 13th Earl of Dalhousie	5 April 1886	20 July 1886	Liberal	Gladstone III
Arthur Balfour; MP for Manchester East	5 August 1886	11 March 1887	Conservative	Salisbury II
Schomberg Kerr; 9th Marquess of Lothian	11 March 1887	11 August 1892	Conservative	Salisbury II
George Trevelyan; MP for Glasgow Bridgeton	18 August 1892	21 June 1895	Liberal	Gladstone IV
George Trevelyan; MP for Glasgow Bridgeton	18 August 1892	21 June 1895	Liberal	Rosebery
Alexander Bruce; 6th Lord Balfour of Burleigh	29 June 1895	9 October 1903	Conservative	Salisbury (III & IV) (Con.–Lib.U.)
Alexander Bruce; 6th Lord Balfour of Burleigh	29 June 1895	9 October 1903	Conservative	Balfour (Con.–Lib.U.)
Andrew Murray; MP for Buteshire	9 October 1903	2 February 1905	Conservative	Balfour (Con.–Lib.U.)
John Hope; 1st Marquess of Linlithgow	2 February 1905	4 December 1905	Conservative	Balfour (Con.–Lib.U.)
John Sinclair; 1st Baron Pentland (Note: MP for Forfar until 1909; created Baron Pentland 1909)	10 December 1905	13 February 1912	Liberal	Campbell-Bannerman
John Sinclair; 1st Baron Pentland	10 December 1905	13 February 1912	Liberal	Asquith (I–III)
Thomas McKinnon Wood; MP for Glasgow St Rollox	13 February 1912	9 July 1916	Liberal	Asquith (I–III)
Thomas McKinnon Wood; MP for Glasgow St Rollox	13 February 1912	9 July 1916	Liberal	Asquith Coalition (Lib.–Con.–Lab.)
Harold Tennant; MP for Berwickshire	9 July 1916	5 December 1916	Liberal	Asquith Coalition (Lib.–Con.–Lab.)
Robert Munro; MP for Roxburgh and Selkirk (Note: MP for Wick Burghs until 1918; MP for Roxburgh and Selkirk thereafter)	10 December 1916	19 October 1922	Liberal	Lloyd George (I & II) (Lib.–Con.–Lab.)
Ronald Munro Ferguson; 1st Viscount Novar	24 October 1922	22 January 1924	Independent	Law
Ronald Munro Ferguson; 1st Viscount Novar	24 October 1922	22 January 1924	Independent	Baldwin I
William Adamson; MP for West Fife	22 January 1924	3 November 1924	Labour	MacDonald I
John Gilmour; MP for Glasgow Pollok	6 November 1924	26 July 1926	Unionist	Baldwin II

=== Secretaries of state for Scotland (1926–) ===
Secretary of State	Term of office		Party	Ministry
John Gilmour; MP for Glasgow Pollok	26 July 1926	4 June 1929	Unionist	Baldwin II
William Adamson; MP for West Fife	7 June 1929	24 August 1931	Labour	MacDonald II
Archibald Sinclair; MP for Caithness and Sutherland	25 August 1931	28 September 1932	Liberal	National I (N.Lab.–Con.–Lib.N.–Lib.)
Archibald Sinclair; MP for Caithness and Sutherland	25 August 1931	28 September 1932	Liberal	National II (N.Lab.–Con.–Lib.N.–Lib.)
Godfrey Collins; MP for Greenock	28 September 1932	29 October 1936	Liberal National	National II (N.Lab.–Con.–Lib.N.–Lib.)
Godfrey Collins; MP for Greenock	28 September 1932	29 October 1936	Liberal National	National III (Con.–N.Lab.–Lib.N.)
Walter Elliot; MP for Glasgow Kelvingrove	29 October 1936	6 May 1938	Unionist	National III (Con.–N.Lab.–Lib.N.)
Walter Elliot; MP for Glasgow Kelvingrove	29 October 1936	6 May 1938	Unionist	National IV (Con.–N.Lab.–Lib.N.)
John Colville; MP for Midlothian and Peebles Northern	6 May 1938	10 May 1940	Unionist	National IV (Con.–N.Lab.–Lib.N.)
John Colville; MP for Midlothian and Peebles Northern	6 May 1938	10 May 1940	Unionist	Chamberlain War (Con.–N.Lab.–Lib.N.)
Ernest Brown; MP for Leith	14 May 1940	8 February 1941	Liberal National	Churchill War (All parties)
Thomas Johnston; MP for West Stirlingshire	8 February 1941	23 May 1945	Labour	Churchill War (All parties)
Harry Primrose; 6th Earl of Rosebery	25 May 1945	26 July 1945	Liberal National	Churchill Caretaker (Con.–N.Lib.)
Joseph Westwood; MP for Stirling and Falkirk	3 August 1945	7 October 1947	Labour	Attlee (I & II)
Arthur Woodburn; MP for Clackmannan and Eastern Stirlingshire	7 October 1947	28 February 1950	Labour	Attlee (I & II)
Hector McNeil; MP for Greenock	28 February 1950	26 October 1951	Labour	Attlee (I & II)
James Stuart; MP for Moray and Nairn	30 October 1951	13 January 1957	Unionist	Churchill III
James Stuart; MP for Moray and Nairn	30 October 1951	13 January 1957	Unionist	Eden
John Maclay; MP for West Renfrewshire	13 January 1957	13 July 1962	Unionist	Macmillan (I & II)
Michael Noble; MP for Argyllshire	13 July 1962	16 October 1964	Unionist	Macmillan (I & II)
Michael Noble; MP for Argyllshire	13 July 1962	16 October 1964	Unionist	Douglas-Home
Willie Ross; MP for Kilmarnock	18 October 1964	19 June 1970	Labour	Wilson (I & II)
Gordon Campbell; MP for Moray and Nairn	20 June 1970	4 March 1974	Conservative	Heath
Willie Ross; MP for Kilmarnock	5 March 1974	8 April 1976	Labour	Wilson (III & IV)
Bruce Millan; MP for Glasgow Craigton	8 April 1976	4 May 1979	Labour	Callaghan
George Younger; MP for Ayr	5 May 1979	11 January 1986	Conservative	Thatcher I
George Younger; MP for Ayr	5 May 1979	11 January 1986	Conservative	Thatcher II
Malcolm Rifkind; MP for Edinburgh Pentlands	11 January 1986	28 November 1990	Conservative	Thatcher II
Malcolm Rifkind; MP for Edinburgh Pentlands	11 January 1986	28 November 1990	Conservative	Thatcher III
Ian Lang; MP for Galloway and Upper Nithsdale	28 November 1990	5 July 1995	Conservative	Major I
Ian Lang; MP for Galloway and Upper Nithsdale	28 November 1990	5 July 1995	Conservative	Major II
Michael Forsyth; MP for Stirling	5 July 1995	2 May 1997	Conservative	Major II
Donald Dewar; MP for Glasgow Anniesland	2 May 1997	17 May 1999	Labour	Blair I
John Reid; MP for Hamilton North and Bellshill	17 May 1999	25 January 2001	Labour	Blair I
Helen Liddell; MP for Airdrie and Shotts	25 January 2001	13 June 2003	Labour	Blair II
Alistair Darling (Note: Concurrently served as Secretary of State for Transport); MP for Edinburgh South West (Note: MP for Edinburgh Central until 2005; MP for Edinburgh South West thereafter)	13 June 2003	5 May 2006	Labour	Blair II
Alistair Darling; MP for Edinburgh South West	13 June 2003	5 May 2006	Labour	Blair III
Douglas Alexander; MP for Paisley and Renfrewshire South	5 May 2006	28 June 2007	Labour	Blair III
Des Browne (Note: Concurrently served as Secretary of State for Defence); MP for Kilmarnock and Loudoun	28 June 2007	3 October 2008	Labour	Brown
Jim Murphy; MP for East Renfrewshire	3 October 2008	11 May 2010	Labour	Brown
Danny Alexander; MP for Inverness, Nairn, Badenoch and Strathspey	12 May 2010	29 May 2010	Liberal Democrat	Cameron–Clegg (Con.–L.D.)
Michael Moore; MP for Berwickshire, Roxburgh and Selkirk	29 May 2010	7 October 2013	Liberal Democrat	Cameron–Clegg (Con.–L.D.)
Alistair Carmichael; MP for Orkney and Shetland	7 October 2013	8 May 2015	Liberal Democrat	Cameron–Clegg (Con.–L.D.)
David Mundell; MP for Dumfriesshire, Clydesdale and Tweeddale	11 May 2015	24 July 2019	Conservative	Cameron II
David Mundell; MP for Dumfriesshire, Clydesdale and Tweeddale	11 May 2015	24 July 2019	Conservative	May I
David Mundell; MP for Dumfriesshire, Clydesdale and Tweeddale	11 May 2015	24 July 2019	Conservative	May II
Alister Jack; MP for Dumfries and Galloway	24 July 2019	5 July 2024	Conservative	Johnson I
Alister Jack; MP for Dumfries and Galloway	24 July 2019	5 July 2024	Conservative	Johnson II
Alister Jack; MP for Dumfries and Galloway	24 July 2019	5 July 2024	Conservative	Truss
Alister Jack; MP for Dumfries and Galloway	24 July 2019	5 July 2024	Conservative	Sunak
Ian Murray; MP for Edinburgh South	5 July 2024	5 September 2025	Labour	Starmer
Douglas Alexander; MP for Lothian East	5 September 2025	Incumbent	Labour	Starmer
Douglas Alexander; MP for Lothian East	5 September 2025	Incumbent	Labour	Burnham

== See also ==
- First Minister of Scotland
- Secretary of State, a senior post in the pre-Union government of the Kingdom of Scotland
- Under-Secretary of State for Scotland, junior minister supporting the Secretary of State for Scotland
- Shadow Secretary of State for Scotland
- Secretary of State (Jacobite)
- Secretary of State for Northern Ireland
- Secretary of State for Wales
