= William McKelvey =

British politician

William McKelvey (8 July 1934 – 19 October 2016) was a British Labour Party politician who served as the MP for Kilmarnock from the 1979 to 1983 general election and for Kilmarnock and Loudoun from 1983 until his retirement in 1997 on health grounds.

He was educated at Morgan Academy in Dundee, and Dundee College of Technology (now Abertay University). Before he was elected as an MP he had previously been a member of Dundee District Council, a full-time Labour Party official and a trade union official. He had also worked for NCR in Dundee and served in the Royal Air Force.

He died in October 2016, at the age of 82. Following his death, fellow former Labour MP George Galloway, who also began his political career in Dundee, described McKelvey as his "mentor" and called him "one of a kind," delivering the eulogy at his funeral.

Parliament of the United Kingdom
Preceded by Willie Ross	Member of Parliament for Kilmarnock; 1979–1983	Constituency abolished
New constituency	Member of Parliament for Kilmarnock and Loudoun; 1983–1997	Succeeded by Des Browne
