= Rose Smith =

British communist activist, educator and union organizer (1891–1985)

Rosina Smith (10 May 1891 – 23 July 1985) was a British communist activist, educator and union organizer.

== Early life ==
Born Rosina Ellis in Putney in London, Smith moved with her family first to Clay Cross and then Chesterfield in Derbyshire, where she won a scholarship to attend secondary school. She then became a pupil teacher and, in 1909, qualified as an infant school teacher.

Smith joined the Social Democratic Federation (SDF) in about 1910 and, the following year, attended a course on political science run by the Workers Educational Association (WEA). She was offered a place at Lady Margaret Hall to train as a WEA lecturer, but rejected it, as she was concerned that the WEA would restrict her from expressing her Marxist views. However, she did attend WEA summer schools at Balliol College in Oxford. She remained a member of the SDF it later became the British Socialist Party. In 1916, she married Alfred Smith, and was thereby compelled to leave her teaching job. Instead, during World War I, she worked in a munitions factory, where she became the leading trade unionist and, later, a full-time union official.

== Activism in Mansfield ==
Around this time, Smith moved to Mansfield in nearby Nottinghamshire, where she joined the Socialist Labour Party, the local branch then led by John Lavin and Owen Ford. In 1922, the entire branch joined the new Communist Party of Great Britain (CPGB), although as she was married and had young twin children, the CPGB decided to place her on a special probationary membership. Despite this, Smith became a highly active member, the secretary of the Mansfield Labour College, a delegate to Mansfield Trades Council, and a prominent member of the National Minority Movement.

In 1928, Smith became the CPGB's National Women's Officer, and the following year, she became a full-time organiser for the CPGB. She stood as the party's candidate in Mansfield at the 1929 general election, taking only 533 votes. Smith and her husband had drifted apart, and the two separated in 1930; she moved with the children to Burnley in Lancashire, hoping to organise women involved in local textile work to join the Minority Movement. She was selected to stand for the party in the Burnley constituency at the 1931 general election, but was arrested after supporting pickets during a strike and sentenced to three months in prison.

== Later career in England ==
On her release, Smith relocated to nearby Bolton, where she stood in the 1932 council election. In that year, she led the Women's Hunger March, and was elected to the CPGB's Central Committee, serving until 1938. Although generally loyal to the party line, she opposed the dissolution of the National Minority Movement, and lobbied for the party to support birth control.

From 1942 until 1955, Smith worked as a journalist with the Daily Worker; she then retired to Chesterfield and devoted the remainder of the decade to the Campaign for Nuclear Disarmament. By 1960, she had become bored with this, and decided to move to Australia to live with her son, but she felt she was a burden there. She spoke with Ted Hill and decided to take up a post in China, working for the Foreign Languages Press. After speaking with Zhou Enlai, she decided to support Maoism following the Sino-Soviet split; this led her to lose contact with many former friends in the CPGB.

== China ==
Smith later worked on China Reconstructs, the semi-official journal that presented China to foreign readers, and then at the Xinhua News Agency. She left China during the Cultural Revolution, returning to the Chesterfield, where she worked in a nursing home, but later went back to China, on the personal request of Zhou Enlai. She worked until the age of 90, and continued to appear at official events in Beijing until her death in 1985.

Party political offices
| Preceded by Beth Turner | Communist Party of Great Britain National Women's Organiser; 1928–1933 | Succeeded by Position abolished next holder: Isabel Brown |
