= 1933 Kilmarnock by-election =

1933 UK Parliamentary by-election

The 1933 Kilmarnock by-election was a by-election held on 2 November 1933 for the UK House of Commons constituency of Kilmarnock in Ayrshire.

== Vacancy ==
The vacancy had arisen when Scotland's second most senior judge, the Lord Justice Clerk, Lord Alness, retired. It was a long-standing convention that when a vacancy arose in this office (or in the most senior judicial office, that of Lord President), the Lord Advocate (head of the Scottish criminal justice system) of the day would be appointed to fill the vacancy. The Lord Advocate in 1933 was Sir Craigie Mason Aitchison, K.C., M.P., and so he was appointed to the bench, automatically resigning his seat.

Aitchison had been elected as a member of the Labour Party in a 1929 by-election following the death of Robert Climie. In 1931, the Labour Government had split, with a handful of Labour MPs, including Aitchison, following Prime Minister Ramsay MacDonald into a coalition National Government with the Conservatives. These MPs were expelled from the Labour Party and called themselves National Labour.

== Candidates ==
The National Labour candidate was 37-year-old Kenneth Lindsay, who had contested the 1924 and 1929 elections as a Labour Party candidate in English constituencies.

The parties in the National Government did not contest by-elections when vacancies arose in seats held by other parties in the government, so the Unionist Party and the Liberal Nationals did not field candidates. Prominent Scottish Unionist and cabinet minister Walter Elliot wrote a letter endorsing Lindsay and urging voters to support him. He was also supported by Ishbel MacDonald, daughter of Ramsay MacDonald, who addressed female voters and urged them to back him.

The Labour Party candidate in Kilmarnock was Rev James Barr, hoping to regain the seat which Labour had won in 1929.

John Pollock stood for the Independent Labour Party, and Sir A. M. MacEwen represented both the National Party of Scotland and the Scottish Party (the two parties united the following year to form the Scottish National Party). The Duke of Montrose, one of the leaders of the Scottish Party, made a prominent speech in support of MacEwan in Kilmarnock during the campaign. During this speech he addressed the issue of the position of Scottish home rule in relation to the Irish in Scotland While he stated that he had "nothing but friendly feelings for the Irish", he added that when Ireland achieved Home Rule, "Scottish men and women were disenfranchised" and stated "as they did to us we should do to them and others."

== Result ==
With the Labour vote split three ways, the result was a victory for Lindsay, who was elected with less than 35% of the vote, one of the smallest vote shares ever for a by-election winner. He held the seat until the 1945 general election, when he was elected as an independent MP for the Combined English Universities.

Kilmarnock by-election, 2 November 1933
Party	Candidate	Votes	%	±%
National Labour	Kenneth Lindsay	12,577	34.8	−24.8
Labour	James Barr	9,924	27.4	N/A
Ind. Labour Party	John Pollock	7,575	20.9	−19.5
Scottish Party	Alexander MacEwen	6,098	16.9	New
Majority		2,653	7.4	−11.8
Turnout		36,174	77.3	−2.2
National Labour hold		Swing		

== Previous result ==
General election, October 1931: Kilmarnock
Party	Candidate	Votes	%	±%
National Labour	Craigie Aitchison	21,803	59.6	+4.0
Ind. Labour Party	John Pollock	14,767	40.4	N/A
Majority		7,036	19.2	+3.6
Turnout		36,580	79.5	+7.8
National Labour gain from Labour		Swing		

== See also ==
- Kilmarnock
- 1946 Kilmarnock by-election
- List of United Kingdom by-elections (1931–1950)
- Elections in Scotland
