= Kilmarnock and Loudoun (UK Parliament constituency) =

UK Parliament constituency (since 1983)

Coordinates: 55°35′37″N 4°17′47″W

- County constituency for the House of Commons
- Interactive map of boundaries from 2005
- Location within Scotland
- Subdivision: East Ayrshire
- Electorate: 74,801 (March 2020)
- Major settlements: Auchinleck, Dunlop, Kilmarnock, Kilmaurs, Stewarton

Current constituency
- Created: 1983
- Member of Parliament: Lillian Jones (Labour)
- Created from: Kilmarnock

Kilmarnock and Loudoun is a county constituency of the House of Commons of the Parliament of the United Kingdom. It elects one Member of Parliament (MP), using the first-past-the-post voting system. It has been represented since 2024 by Lillian Jones of Labour.

== Boundaries ==
The constituency consists of the northern and central areas of East Ayrshire and contains the town of Kilmarnock and the Irvine Valley. It does not share the same borders as the former Scottish Parliament constituency of the same name.

There was a Kilmarnock and Loudoun local government district covering a similar area, from 1975 to 1996. At the 1983 general election, this district was coterminous with the constituency boundaries

Under the Fifth Review of UK Parliament constituencies, the constituency was expanded to include part of the abolished Carrick, Cumnock and Doon Valley constituency; the boundaries were defined in accordance with the ward structure in place on 30 November 2004. Under the 2023 review of Westminster constituencies, which came into effect for the 2024 general election, the boundaries were unchanged.

Further to reviews of local government ward boundaries which came into effect in 2007 and 2017, but did not affect the parliamentary boundaries, the contents of the constituency are now defined as comprising the following electoral wards of the East Ayrshire council area:

- Annick, Ballochmyle, Irvine Valley, Kilmarnock East and Hurlford, Kilmarnock North, Kilmarnock South, Kilmarnock West and Crosshouse, and a very small part of Cumnock and New Cumnock.

The main towns and villages are:

- Newmilns and Greenholm
- Catrine *
- Auchinleck *
- Darvel
- Galston
- Hurlford
- Kilmarnock
- Kilmaurs
- Logan *
- Lugar *
- Mauchline *
- Muirkirk *
- Ochiltree*
- Sorn *
- Stewarton
- Dunlop

Those towns marked * were not part of the original Kilmarnock and Loudoun, but were absorbed from the disbanded Carrick, Cumnock and Doon Valley.

== Members of Parliament ==
Election	Member	Party
1983	Willie McKelvey	Labour
1997	Des Browne	Labour
2010	Cathy Jamieson	Labour Co-operative
2015	Alan Brown	SNP
2024	Lillian Jones	Labour

== Election results ==
=== Elections in the 2020s ===
General election 2024: Kilmarnock and Loudoun
Party	Candidate	Votes	%	±%
Labour	Lillian Jones	19,055	44.9	+26.0
SNP	Alan Brown	13,936	32.8	−18.0
Conservative	Jordan Cowie	3,527	8.3	−16.0
Reform	William Thomson	3,472	8.2	N/A
Green	Bex Glen	1,237	2.9	N/A
Liberal Democrats	Edward Thornley	850	2.0	−3.1
Independent	Stephen MacNamara	401	0.9	N/A
Majority		5,119	12.1	N/A
Turnout		42,478	56.9	−7.0
Registered electors		74,628		
Labour gain from SNP		Swing	+22.0	

=== Elections in the 2010s ===
General election 2019: Kilmarnock and Loudoun
Party	Candidate	Votes	%	±%
SNP	Alan Brown	24,216	50.8	+8.5
Conservative	Caroline Hollins-Martin	11,557	24.3	−2.4
Labour	Kevin McGregor	9,009	18.9	−10.0
Liberal Democrats	Edward Thornley	2,444	5.1	+3.0
Scottish Libertarian	Stef Johnstone	405	0.9	New
Majority		12,659	26.5	+13.1
Turnout		47,631	63.9	+0.5
SNP hold		Swing	+9.2	

General election 2017: Kilmarnock and Loudoun
Party	Candidate	Votes	%	±%
SNP	Alan Brown	19,690	42.3	−13.4
Labour Co-op	Laura Dover	13,421	28.9	−1.5
Conservative	Alison Harper	12,404	26.7	+14.2
Liberal Democrats	Irene Lang	994	2.1	+0.6
Majority		6,269	13.4	−11.9
Turnout		46,509	63.4	−8.2
SNP hold		Swing	−5.9	

General election 2015: Kilmarnock and Loudoun
Party	Candidate	Votes	%	±%
SNP	Alan Brown	30,000	55.7	+29.7
Labour Co-op	Cathy Jamieson	16,362	30.4	−22.1
Conservative	Brian Whittle	6,752	12.5	−1.7
Liberal Democrats	Rodney Ackland	789	1.5	−5.8
Majority		13,638	25.3	N/A
Turnout		53,903	71.6	+8.8
SNP gain from Labour Co-op		Swing	+25.9	

General election 2010: Kilmarnock and Loudoun
Party	Candidate	Votes	%	±%
Labour Co-op	Cathy Jamieson	24,460	52.5	+5.2
SNP	George Leslie	12,082	26.0	−1.7
Conservative	Janette McAlpine	6,592	14.2	+2.9
Liberal Democrats	Sebastian M. Tombs	3,419	7.3	−3.8
Majority		12,378	26.5	+6.9
Turnout		46,553	62.8	+1.9
Labour Co-op hold		Swing	+3.5	

=== Elections in the 2000s ===
General election 2005: Kilmarnock and Loudoun
Party	Candidate	Votes	%	±%
Labour	Des Browne	20,976	47.3	−7.7
SNP	Daniel Coffey	12,273	27.7	+3.3
Conservative	Gary Smith	5,026	11.3	+1.2
Liberal Democrats	Kevin Lang	4,945	11.1	+3.5
Scottish Socialist	Hugh Kerr	833	1.9	−0.9
UKIP	Ronnie Robertson	330	0.7	New
Majority		8,703	19.6	−7.8
Turnout		44,383	60.9	−1.2
Labour hold		Swing	−5.5	

General election 2001: Kilmarnock and Loudoun
Party	Candidate	Votes	%	±%
Labour	Des Browne	19,926	52.9	+3.1
SNP	John M. Brady	9,592	25.5	−9.0
Conservative	Donald Reece	3,943	10.5	−0.3
Liberal Democrats	John Stewart	3,177	8.4	+4.4
Scottish Socialist	Jason Muir	1,027	2.7	New
Majority		10,334	27.4	+12.1
Turnout		37,665	61.7	−15.4
Labour hold		Swing	−6.1	

=== Elections in the 1990s ===
General election 1997: Kilmarnock and Loudoun
Party	Candidate	Votes	%	±%
Labour	Des Browne	23,621	49.8	+5.0
SNP	Alex Neil	16,365	34.5	+3.8
Conservative	Douglas Taylor	5,125	10.8	−8.2
Liberal Democrats	John Stewart	1,891	4.0	−1.5
Referendum	William Sneddon	284	0.6	New
Natural Law	William Gilmour	123	0.3	New
Majority		7,256	15.3	+1.2
Turnout		47,409	77.1	−2.9
Labour hold		Swing		

General election 1992: Kilmarnock and Loudoun
Party	Candidate	Votes	%	±%
Labour	William McKelvey	22,210	44.8	−3.7
SNP	Alex Neil	15,231	30.7	+12.5
Conservative	Richard Wilkinson	9,438	19.0	−0.6
Liberal Democrats	Kate Philbrick	2,722	5.5	−8.2
Majority		6,979	14.1	−15.8
Turnout		49,601	80.0	+2.0
Labour hold		Swing		

=== Elections in the 1980s ===
General election 1987: Kilmarnock and Loudoun
Party	Candidate	Votes	%	±%
Labour	William McKelvey	23,713	48.5	+4.9
Conservative	Aileen Bates	9,586	19.6	−5.1
SNP	George Leslie	8,881	18.2	+9.2
SDP	Peter Kerr	6,698	13.7	−9.0
Majority		14,127	28.9	+10.0
Turnout		48,878	78.0	+2.4
Labour hold		Swing	+5.0	

General election 1983: Kilmarnock and Loudoun
Party	Candidate	Votes	%	±%
Labour	William McKelvey	20,250	43.6	−9.0
Conservative	Peter Leckie	11,450	24.7	−4.4
SDP	Aubrey Ross	10,545	22.7	New
SNP	Charles Calman	4,165	9.0	−9.3
Majority		8,800	18.9	−4.5
Turnout		46,410	75.6	−5.5
Labour win (new seat)				

== See also ==
- List of UK Parliamentary constituencies in Scotland
- Kilmarnock and Loudoun district
