= Top Level Group =

The Top Level Group of UK Parliamentarians for Multilateral Nuclear Disarmament and Non-proliferation (TLG) is a cross-party parliamentary group in the United Kingdom, whose primary focus is the advancement of the nuclear disarmament and non-proliferation agenda in Britain and internationally. It is formed of almost all the former senior Ministers of foreign affairs and defence over the last two decades and includes former Chiefs of Defence and two former NATO Secretaries General.

The Rt Hon Des Browne, former Defence Secretary, was the first convenor of the TLG, which is now led by Alistair Burt MP. The Top Level Group is administered and supported by the European Leadership Network.

== Formation ==
The group was established in October 2009, in response to, and in tandem with, the growing international prominence of the issue of nuclear disarmament and non-proliferation. This momentum has been driven by former US Secretaries of State Henry Kissinger and George Shultz, former Defence Secretary William Perry and former Senator Sam Nunn in their Wall Street Journal article of January 2007, (which has since evolved into the Nuclear Security Project), as well as by U.S. President Barack Obama's Prague speech in April 2009, in which he outlined his vision of a nuclear-free world.

=== Members ===
The members of the group are as follows:

| Name | Party | Offices held |
|---|---|---|
| Bob Ainsworth | Labour | Defence Secretary (2009–2010) |
| Michael Ancram | Conservative | Shadow Foreign Secretary (2001–05); Shadow Defence Secretary (2005) |
| James Arbuthnot | Conservative | Chairman of the House of Commons Defence Select Committee (2005–2014) |
| Margaret Beckett MP | Labour | Foreign Secretary (2006–2007) |
| The Lord Boyce | Crossbencher | Chief of the Defence Staff (2001–2003) |
| The Lord Bramall | Crossbencher | Chief of the Defence Staff (1982–1985) |
| The Lord Browne of Ladyton | Labour | Defence Secretary (2006–2008) |
| Sir Menzies Campbell | Liberal Democrat | Liberal Democrat Foreign Affairs Spokesman (2001–2006); Leader of the Liberal Democrats (2006–2007) |
| The Lord Carrington | Conservative | First Lord of the Admiralty (1959–1963); Defence Secretary (1970–1974); Foreign Secretary (1979–1982); Secretary General of NATO (1984–1988) |
| The Lord Guthrie of Craigiebank | Crossbencher | Chief of the Defence Staff (1997–2001) |
| The Lord Howe of Aberavon | Conservative | Chancellor of the Exchequer (1979–1983); Foreign Secretary (1983–1989); Deputy Prime Minister (1989–1990) |
| The Lord Howell of Guildford | Conservative | Energy Secretary (1979–1981); Transport Secretary (1981–1983); Minister for Commonwealth Affairs (2010–present) |
| The Lord Hurd of Westwell | Conservative | Foreign Secretary (1989–1995) |
| Adam Ingram | Labour | Minister of State for the Armed Forces (2001–2007) |
| The Lord King of Bridgwater | Conservative | Defence Secretary (1989–1992) |
| The Lord Owen | Crossbencher (previously Labour and SDP) | Foreign Secretary (1977–1979); Leader of the Social Democratic Party (1983–1988) |
| The Lord Ramsbotham | Crossbencher | Commander UK Field Army and Inspector General Territorial Army (1987–1990); Adjutant-General to the Forces (1990–1993) |
| The Lord Reid of Cardowan | Labour | Defence Secretary (2005–2006) |
| Malcolm Rifkind | Conservative | Defence Secretary (1992–1995); Foreign Secretary (1995–1997) |
| The Lord Robertson of Port Ellen | Labour | Defence Secretary (1997–1999); Secretary General of NATO (1999–2004) |
| The Baroness Williams of Crosby | Liberal Democrat | Director of the Nuclear Threat Initiative (2002–present); Adviser on Nuclear Proliferation to Prime Minister Gordon Brown (2007–2010) |

== Key aims ==
According to the Top Level Group website, the aims of the group are:

* Influence and support the UK government’s commitment to taking a lead on nuclear disarmament and non-proliferation;

- Make a UK contribution to the development of a European network of similar parliamentary groups;
- Make an important contribution to the proposed ratification of the Comprehensive Test Ban Treaty (CTBT) by the US; and
- Advocate the agreement of a Fissile Material Cut Off Treaty (FMCT).

== Activities ==
The members of the group are involved in a variety of activities, engaging in parliamentary work, media contributions, and in various relevant NGO conferences.

In February 2010, the group met with David Miliband MP, then Foreign Secretary, to discuss the issue of nuclear disarmament and non-proliferation, particularly as it related to the Nuclear Non-Proliferation Treaty Review Conference later in the year.

On 14 April 2010, the group produced, signed, and arranged for the signatures of 41 senior European figures for a statement published as an open letter on the Guardian online website. This highlighted the world's growing nuclear dangers and called for greater international efforts to address them.

Des Browne, chair of the group, led delegations to Washington and to Moscow in March and April respectively.

Various members of the group have taken part in video interviews, produced by Talkworks Films, regarding the nuclear options and dangers ahead.

The Top Level Group also maintains a website which provides updates for the activities of its members, and which also monitors and publishes parliamentary proceedings relating to nuclear non-proliferation and disarmament.
