= John Lavin (trade unionist) =

- Born: 1879 or 1880; Ireland
- Died: 6 August 1919 (aged 39)
- Organizations: Industrial Workers of the World; Yorkshire Miners' Association; Workers' International Industrial Union

John Lavin (1879 or 1880 – 6 August 1919) was an Irish trade unionist and socialist activist.

Born in Ireland, Lavin studied theology at university. This study made him an atheist, and he decided to become a sailor. He traveled to San Francisco and settled in the city, joining both the Socialist Labor Party of America and the Industrial Workers of the World.

Lavin's possessions were destroyed in the 1906 San Francisco earthquake. Early in the 1910s, he decided to return to Europe, and settled in Yorkshire, becoming a coal miner. He became active in the Yorkshire Miners' Association (YMA) and also joined the British Socialist Labour Party (SLP) and the Workers' International Industrial Union. The YMA asked him to stand for election in Pontefract, but he refused, as it would have required him to stand as a Labour Party candidate.

In 1915, Lavin moved to work at Welbeck Colliery in Nottinghamshire. There, he worked with Owen Ford to form a local branch of the SLP based in Mansfield, which attracted members including Rose Smith. However, within the year, he became seriously ill and largely confined to his house in Warsop. He died in 1919 at the age of 39 and received a non-religious funeral, in line with his wishes. Shortly afterwards, the entirety of the Mansfield SLP joined the Communist Party of Great Britain.
