= Craigie Aitchison, Lord Aitchison =

Scottish politician and judge (1882–1941)

The Honourable Lord Aitchison
- Born: 26 January 1882; Falkirk, Scotland
- Died: 2 May 1941 (aged 59)
- Education: Falkirk High School; University of Edinburgh
- Occupations: Judge, politician
- Political party: Liberal (until 1924); Labour (1924–31); National Labour (since 1931)
- Spouse: Charlotte Mary Forbes Jones (m. 1919)
- Children: John Ronald Craigie Aitchison (1926–2009)

Craigie Mason Aitchison, Lord Aitchison (26 January 1882 – 2 May 1941) was a Scottish politician and judge.

== Early life ==
Mason was born on 16 January 1882 in Falkirk, the second son of Elizabeth Mason Craigie and Revd James Aitchison, senior minister of the Erskine United Free Church.

He was educated at Falkirk High School and the University of Edinburgh where he was the Vans Dunlop Scholar in Mental Philosophy and Muirhead Prizeman in Civil Law. He graduated with an MA in 1903 and an LLB in 1907.

== Career ==
Aitchison became an advocate in 1907. He was particularly effective as a defence counsel in criminal cases, and was regarded as the best advocate before a jury since Sheriff Comrie Thomson. He was noted for the Bickerstaff and John Donald Merritt cases.

He was made a King's Counsel in 1923. He worked with Sir Arthur Conan Doyle and others to secure the release of Oscar Slater, the victim of one of the most notorious miscarriages of justice of the early 20th century. Aitchison who was leading Counsel at the appeal in 1929 gave a 14-hour speech.

=== Politics and law officer ===
An unsuccessful Liberal candidate for Clackmannan and East Stirlingshire in November 1922 and December 1923, he joined the Labour Party and contested The Hartlepools at the October 1924 general election and Glasgow Central in May 1929 — where he reduced a Unionist majority of nearly 6,000 to only 627.

He was elected as Member of Parliament (MP) for Kilmarnock at a by-election in October 1929, and sat for the constituency until October 1933 as a Labour then National Labour member.

He was appointed as Lord Advocate in June 1929 serving in the Second Labour Government alongside Sir William Jowitt, the new Attorney General for England and Wales whose defeat at The Hartlepools in 1924 was attributed to Aitchison's drawing votes to the Liberals.

He was made a Privy Counsellor in 1929, and served as Lord Advocate until October 1933. He was then raised to the bench as Lord Justice Clerk, with the judicial title Lord Aitchison, at which point he automatically resigned his seat in the House of Commons, which resulted in a by-election.

== Personal life ==
In 1919, he married Charlotte Mary Forbes Jones (d. 1970), daughter of James Jones of Torwood Hall, Larbert. They had two sons, one of whom, John Ronald Craigie Aitchison (1926–2009) was a noted painter and a member of the Royal Academy.

== Sources ==
- Craig, F. W. S. (1983) [1969]. British parliamentary election results 1918–1949 (3rd ed.). Chichester: Parliamentary Research Services. ISBN 0-900178-06-X.

Parliament of the United Kingdom
Preceded by Robert Climie	Member of Parliament for Kilmarnock; 1929–1933	Succeeded by Kenneth Martin Lindsay
Legal offices
Preceded by Alexander Munro MacRobert	Lord Advocate; 1929–1933	Succeeded by Wilfrid Guild Normand
Preceded by Lord Alness	Lord Justice Clerk; 1933–1941	Succeeded by Lord Cooper
