= Isabel Brown (British activist) =

British communist activist (1894–1984)

- Born: 6 December 1894
- Died: 22 October 1984 (aged 89)
- Education: Sunderland Teacher Training College

Isabel Brown (6 December 1894 – 22 October 1984) was a British communist activist. Born in Tyneside, England, Brown attended Sunderland Teacher Training College and won a scholarship. Brown was a founding member of the Communist Party of Great Britain and one of only five women delegates to attend its first congress in 1920. Brown died on 22 October 1984 after an injury in an air raid in December 1940.

== Early life ==
Isabel was the youngest of three sisters born into a working-class family in Tyneside. Despite the family's limited means, she was able to obtain a high school education, and won a scholarship to Sunderland Teacher Training College. As a grade-school teacher, her sense of injustice was aroused by having classes of more than 60 children from deeply impoverished circumstances.

== Career ==
After a religious upbringing, Isabel found her faith shaken by the onset of World War I. Her political views were further shaped by attending National Council of Labour Colleges lectures given by communist T. A. Jackson. She was active in the National Union of Teachers and joined the Labour Party in 1918. In 1920, she was a founding member of the Communist Party of Great Britain (CPGB), one of only five women delegates to attend its first congress. In 1921 she married Ernest Brown, a local communist. She lost her teaching post the following year when she became pregnant. The Brown family (their son Ken was born in December 1922) moved to Moscow in 1924 when Ernest was named British representative to the Executive Committee of the Communist International. The Browns returned to the UK just before the General Strike of 1926. During the strike ferment, she delivered an impassioned May Day speech and was arrested for sedition. She was incarcerated for three months in Hull Prison.

In the late 1920s, Brown organised women's sections of the National Unemployed Workers' Movement. Ernest became the CPGB's Scottish organiser, and she relocated with him to Scotland, becoming women's editor of The Mineworker. She stood unsuccessfully in Motherwell in the 1929 general election, and in the Kilmarnock by-election later in the year. In 1930, Brown studied at the International Lenin School. In the mid-1930s, she led the British Committee for the Relief of Victims of Fascism and was prominent in the British Aid for Spain Committee. She was known for giving emotionally stirring speeches on behalf of the Republican faction in the Spanish Civil War, and for her skill at responding to audience questions. She played a central role in the cross-party National Joint Committee for Spanish Relief. This included helping with efforts to house the Basque refugees who came to Britain in 1937.

== Injury and death ==
In 1939, Brown was appointed National Women's Organiser for the CPGB. She stood in the 1940 Bow and Bromley by-election, taking only 4.2% of the vote even though she faced only one opponent. Brown was seriously injured in a December 1940 air raid. She was hospitalized for six months and never fully recovered. She scaled back her CPGB commitments, resigning as Women's Organiser in 1943, and from the Central Committee in 1947. She stood in her final election at Kilmarnock in 1948, but again failed to come near winning the seat. Despite increasingly poor health, Brown continued to speak on behalf of the CPGB, and to teach and attend conferences until her death in October 1984.

Political offices
Preceded by Jack Leckie	British Secretary of Workers International Relief; 1929 – 1933	Organisation dissolved
Party political offices
Vacant Position re-established Title last held by Rose Smith	National Women's Organiser of the Communist Party of Great Britain; 1939 – 1943	Succeeded by Nora Jeffrey?
