= Kilmarnock (UK Parliament constituency) =

Parliamentary constituency in the United Kingdom, 1918–1983

- Former county constituency for the House of Commons
- Subdivision: Ayrshire
- Major settlements: Kilmarnock

1918–1983
- Seats: One
- Created from: Kilmarnock Burghs, Ayrshire North and Ayrshire South
- Replaced by: Kilmarnock and Loudoun

Kilmarnock was a county constituency of the House of Commons of the Parliament of the United Kingdom from 1918 to 1983. It elected one Member of Parliament (MP) by the first past the post system of election.

The constituency included the area of the former parliamentary burgh of Kilmarnock. The parliamentary burgh had been, previously, a component of the Kilmarnock Burghs constituency.

Prominent Members for this seat included long-serving Scottish Secretary Willie Ross, and senior judge Craigie Mason Aitchison.

== Boundaries ==
=== 1918 to 1950 ===
The constituency was created by the Representation of the People Act 1918 as one of four constituencies covering the county of Ayr and the county of Bute. Of the other three constituencies, two were county constituencies: Bute and Northern Ayrshire and South Ayrshire. The third, Ayr Burghs, was a district of burghs constituency. All four constituencies were entirely within the boundaries of the two counties.

The Kilmarnock constituency consisted of "The county district of Kilmarnock, inclusive of all burghs situated therein except insofar as included in the Ayr District of Burghs."

The counties of Ayr and Bute had been covered, previously, by the five constituencies of Ayr Burghs, Buteshire, Kilmarnock Burghs, North Ayrshire and South Ayrshire. Two of these, Ayr Burghs and Kilmarnock Burghs, had included areas (parliamentary burghs) outside the two counties.

=== 1950 to 1974 ===
Constituency boundaries were redrawn in 1950, creating five constituencies to cover the counties of Ayr and Bute. Ayr Burghs was abolished and two new county constituencies, Ayr and Central Ayrshire, were created. Part of the Kilmarnock constituency was transferred to the new Central Ayrshire constituency.

=== 1974 to 1975 ===
In 1974, the boundary between the Kilmarnock and Ayrshire Central constituencies was redrawn to enlarge Kilmarnock.

=== 1975 to 1983 ===
In 1975, under the Local Government (Scotland) Act 1973, local government counties were abolished and replaced by a system of regions and districts. The areas of the counties of Ayr and Bute were merged into the Strathclyde region and, thus, the Kilmarnock constituency became one of a number covering the region. Eight years were to elapse before new constituency boundaries took account of new local government boundaries.

In 1983 the Kilmarnock constituency was merged into the Kilmarnock and Loudoun constituency.

== Members of Parliament ==
Election	Member	Party	Notes
1918	Alexander Shaw	Coalition Liberal	
1922	Alexander Shaw	National Liberal	Resigned in November 1923, seat remained vacant until the General Election
1923	Robert Climie	Labour	
1924	Charles MacAndrew	Unionist	
1929	Robert Climie	Labour	
1929 by-election	Craigie Aitchison	Labour	
1931	Craigie Aitchison	National Labour	
1933 by-election	Kenneth Lindsay	National Labour	
1945	Clarice Shaw	Labour	
1946 by-election	Willie Ross	Labour	Secretary of State for Scotland (1964–1970, 1974–1976)
1979	William McKelvey	Labour	
1983	constituency abolished: see Kilmarnock and Loudoun		

== Election results ==
=== Elections in the 1910s ===
Alexander Shaw

General election 1918: Kilmarnock
Party		Candidate	Votes	%
C	National Liberal	Alexander Shaw	13,568	67.1
	Co-operative Party	Peter Malcolm	6,652	32.9
Majority			6,916	34.2
Turnout			20,220	62.6
Registered electors			32,298	
	National Liberal win (new seat)			
C indicates candidate endorsed by the coalition government.

=== Elections in the 1920s ===
General election 1922: Kilmarnock
Party	Candidate	Votes	%	±%
National Liberal	Alexander Shaw	12,991	54.7	−12.4
Labour	Robert Climie	10,752	45.3	N/A
Majority		2,239	9.4	−24.8
Turnout		23,743	71.5	+8.9
Registered electors		33,210		
National Liberal hold		Swing	−12.4	

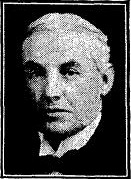
Sir Donald Maclean

General election 1923: Kilmarnock
Party	Candidate	Votes	%	±%
Labour	Robert Climie	10,992	43.2	−2.1
Liberal	Donald Maclean	8,185	32.1	−22.6
Unionist	Alexander Morrice Mackay	6,298	24.7	New
Majority		2,807	11.1	N/A
Turnout		25,475	75.7	+4.2
Registered electors		33,652		
Labour gain from Liberal		Swing	+10.3	

General election 1924: Kilmarnock
Party	Candidate	Votes	%	±%
Unionist	Charles MacAndrew	14,237	52.2	+27.5
Labour	Robert Climie	13,054	47.8	+4.6
Majority		1,183	4.4	N/A
Turnout		27,291	79.5	+3.8
Registered electors		34,315		
Unionist gain from Labour		Swing	+11.5	

General election 1929: Kilmarnock
Party	Candidate	Votes	%	±%
Labour	Robert Climie	17,368	48.2	+0.4
Unionist	Charles MacAndrew	10,939	30.4	−21.8
Liberal	James Rutherford	7,700	21.4	New
Majority		6,429	17.8	N/A
Turnout		36,007	77.8	−1.7
Registered electors		46,310		
Labour gain from Unionist		Swing	+11.1	

1929 Kilmarnock by-election
Party	Candidate	Votes	%	±%
Labour	Craigie Aitchison	18,465	55.6	+7.4
Unionist	Charles MacAndrew	13,270	40.0	+9.6
Communist	Isabel Brown	1,448	4.4	New
Majority		5,195	15.6	−2.2
Turnout		33,183	71.7	−6.1
Registered electors		46,310		
Labour hold		Swing	−1.1	

=== Elections in the 1930s ===
General election 1931: Kilmarnock
Party	Candidate	Votes	%	±%
National Labour	Craigie Aitchison	21,803	59.6	+4.0
Ind. Labour Party	John Pollock	14,767	40.4	N/A
Majority		7,036	19.2	N/A
Turnout		36,580	79.5	+7.8
National Labour gain from Labour		Swing		

1933 Kilmarnock by-election
Party	Candidate	Votes	%	±%
National Labour	Kenneth Lindsay	12,577	34.8	−24.8
Labour	James Barr	9,924	27.4	N/A
Ind. Labour Party	John Pollock	7,575	20.9	−19.5
Scottish Party	Alexander MacEwen	6,098	16.9	New
Majority		2,653	7.4	−11.8
Turnout		36,174	77.3	−2.2
National Labour hold		Swing		

General election 1935: Kilmarnock
Party	Candidate	Votes	%	±%
National Labour	Kenneth Lindsay	19,115	50.9	+16.1
Labour	James Crawford	12,558	33.4	+6.0
Ind. Labour Party	John Pollock	3,582	9.5	−11.4
SNP	T. W. Campbell	2,346	6.2	−10.7
Majority		6,557	17.5	+10.1
Turnout		37,601	78.8	+1.5
National Labour hold		Swing	+5.0	

=== Elections in the 1940s ===
General election 1945: Kilmarnock
Party	Candidate	Votes	%	±%
Labour	Clarice Shaw	23,837	59.4	+26.0
Unionist	George E.O. Walker	16,300	40.6	New
Majority		7,537	18.8	N/A
Turnout		40,137	76.1	−2.7
Labour gain from National Labour		Swing		

1946 Kilmarnock by-election
Party	Candidate	Votes	%	±%
Labour	Willie Ross	22,456	59.7	+0.3
Unionist	George E.O. Walker	12,239	32.5	−8.1
SNP	George Dott	2,932	7.8	New
Majority		10,217	27.2	+8.4
Turnout		37,627	68.4	−7.7
Labour hold		Swing	+4.2	

=== Elections in the 1950s ===
General election 1950: Kilmarnock
Party	Candidate	Votes	%	±%
Labour	Willie Ross	22,412	56.58	−2.80
Unionist	McInnes Shaw	14,179	35.80	−4.80
Liberal	John Gibson Thomson	2,157	5.45	New
Communist	Isabel Brown	860	2.17	New
Majority		8,233	20.79	+2.0
Turnout		39,608	86.15	+10.1
Registered electors		45,974		
Labour hold		Swing	+1.0	

General election 1951: Kilmarnock
Party	Candidate	Votes	%	±%
Labour	Willie Ross	24,664	60.72	+4.14
Unionist	Norman Macleod Glen	15,955	39.28	+3.48
Majority		8,709	21.44	+0.65
Turnout		40,619	86.66	+0.51
Registered electors		46,869		
Labour hold		Swing	+0.33	

General election 1955: Kilmarnock
Party	Candidate	Votes	%	±%
Labour	Willie Ross	23,324	60.89	+0.17
Unionist	John Sutherland	14,983	39.11	−0.17
Majority		8,341	21.78	+0.34
Turnout		38,307	81.07	−5.59
Registered electors		47,254		
Labour hold		Swing	+0.17	

General election 1959: Kilmarnock
Party	Candidate	Votes	%	±%
Labour	Willie Ross	25,379	62.72	+1.83
Unionist	R Ian McNaught	15,087	37.28	−1.83
Majority		10,292	25.44	+3.66
Turnout		40,466	82.43	+1.36
Registered electors		49,090		
Labour hold		Swing	+1.83	

=== Elections in the 1960s ===
General election 1964: Kilmarnock
Party	Candidate	Votes	%	±%
Labour	Willie Ross	25,173	62.29	−0.43
Unionist	Graham H Webster	10,796	26.71	−10.57
Liberal	Ian M Will	4,443	10.99	New
Majority		14,377	35.58	+10.16
Turnout		40,412	82.77	+0.34
Registered electors		48,824		
Labour hold		Swing	+5.04	

General election 1966: Kilmarnock
Party	Candidate	Votes	%	±%
Labour	Willie Ross	26,036	68.54	+6.25
Conservative	Albert McQuarrie	11,949	31.46	+4.75
Majority		14,087	37.08	+1.50
Turnout		37,985	79.02	−3.75
Registered electors		48,073		
Labour hold		Swing	+0.75	

=== Elections in the 1970s ===
General election 1970: Kilmarnock
Party	Candidate	Votes	%	±%
Labour	Willie Ross	24,477	59.3	−9.2
Conservative	G Law	11,476	27.8	−3.6
SNP	Alistair MacInnes	2,836	6.9	New
Liberal	Archibald James Wight	2,459	6.0	New
Majority		13,001	31.52	−5.6
Turnout		41,248	79.1	±0.0
Labour hold		Swing		

General election February 1974: Kilmarnock
Party	Candidate	Votes	%	±%
Labour	Willie Ross	23,544	47.20	−12.14
Conservative	Kenneth Alexander Ross	13,817	27.70	−0.12
SNP	Alistair MacInnes	7,644	15.32	+7.44
Liberal	Archibald James Wight	4,878	9.78	+3.82
Majority		9,727	19.50	−12.02
Turnout		49,883	83.25	+3.19
Labour hold		Swing		

General election October 1974: Kilmarnock
Party	Candidate	Votes	%	±%
Labour	Willie Ross	22,184	45.69	−1.51
SNP	Alistair MacInnes	14,655	30.19	+14.86
Conservative	William Adams	9,203	18.96	−8.74
Liberal	Kevin Purcell	2,508	5.17	−4.61
Majority		7,529	15.50	−4.00
Turnout		48,550	80.41	−2.84
Labour hold		Swing	−8.18	

General election 1979: Kilmarnock
Party	Candidate	Votes	%	±%
Labour	William McKelvey	25,718	52.56	+6.87
Conservative	John Corbett	14,251	29.12	+10.17
SNP	Alistair MacInnes	8,963	18.32	−11.87
Majority		11,467	23.44	+7.93
Turnout		48,932	81.08	+0.67
Labour hold		Swing	−1.65	

== See also ==
- Kilmarnock
- 1929 Kilmarnock by-election
- 1933 Kilmarnock by-election
- 1946 Kilmarnock by-election
- Former United Kingdom Parliament constituencies
