= John Lavin (artist) =

American Artist

John Lavin is a production designer, art director and painter from Seattle, Washington. He works mainly in film, music videos, commercials, and photography.

== Early life and education ==
Lavin was born in Olympia, Washington, but later moved to Seattle, Washington.

While attending graduate school for painting in New York City, Lavin dressed the windows at Barneys.

== Career ==
Lavin makes sets and props for film, takes still photography, and works with many local and national clients, including advertisers, retailers, and independent filmmakers.

Lavin is known for his work on Your Sister's Sister (2011), Laggies (2014) and Lucky Them (2013).

Lavin has worked alongside music artists such as Macklemore and Ed Sheeran, and was the art director of Bill and Melinda Gates's "Annual Letter" video.

== Filmography ==
- "Shape of You" by Ed Sheeran
- "Galway Girl" by Ed Sheeran
- "Dance Off" by Macklemore and Ryan Lewis
- "Downtown" by Macklemore and Ryan Lewis
- "Arrows" by Macklemore and Fences
