= 1929 Kilmarnock by-election =

UK parliamentary by-election

The 1929 Kilmarnock by-election was a by-election held on 27 November 1929 for the British House of Commons constituency of Kilmarnock in Ayrshire.

The first Scottish by-election since the general election in May 1929, it was won by the Labour Party candidate Craigie Aitchison.

== Vacancy ==
The seat had become vacant when the sitting Labour Member of Parliament (MP), Robert Climie had died at the age of 61 on 3 October 1929. He had held the seat since the general election in May 1929, having previously been Kilmarnock's MP from 1923 until his defeat in the 1924 general election.

== Candidates ==
The Labour Party candidate was 47-year-old Craigie Aitchison KC, who had been the Lord Advocate of Scotland since June 1929. He had stood as a Liberal Party candidate in Clackmannan and East Stirlingshire at the 1922 and 1923 general elections. He had contested the 1924 general election as a Labour candidate in The Hartlepools, and in May 1929 came within a small margin of winning the Unionist-held Glasgow Central seat.

The Unionist candidate was 41-year-old Charles MacAndrew, who had won the seat from Climie in 1924, but lost it again in May 1929.

The third candidate was Isabel Brown, of the Communist Party of Great Britain. The Liberals, who had finished third at the general election, did not field a candidate.

== Result ==
The result was a victory for the Labour candidate, Craigie Aitchison, who held the seat with an increased share of the vote. However, his majority was lower than Climie's, the Unionists having benefited from the absence of a Liberal candidate.

Aitchison was re-elected at the 1931 general election as a National Labour candidate, having sided with Prime Minister Ramsay MacDonald when the Labour Party split and MacDonald formed a National Government with the Conservative Party. He resigned his seat in 1933, when he was appointed Lord Justice Clerk.

MacAndrew returned to the House of Commons in 1931 as MP for Glasgow Partick.

Kilmarnock by-election, 27 November 1929
Party	Candidate	Votes	%	±%
Labour	Craigie Aitchison	18,465	55.6	+7.4
Unionist	Charles MacAndrew	13,270	40.0	+9.6
Communist	Isabel Brown	1,448	4.4	New
Majority		5,195	15.6	−2.2
Turnout		33,183	71.7	−6.1
Labour hold		Swing	-1.1	

== Previous result ==
General election, May 1929: Kilmarnock
Party	Candidate	Votes	%	±%
Labour	Robert Climie	17,368	48.2	+0.4
Unionist	Charles MacAndrew	10,939	30.4	−21.8
Liberal	J. R. Rutherford	7,700	21.4	New
Majority		6,429	17.8	N/A
Turnout		36,007	77.8	−1.7
Labour gain from Unionist		Swing	+11.2	

== See also ==
- Kilmarnock (UK Parliament constituency)
- Kilmarnock
- 1933 Kilmarnock by-election
- 1946 Kilmarnock by-election
- List of United Kingdom by-elections (1931–1950)
- Elections in Scotland

== Sources ==
- Craig, F. W. S. (1983) [1969]. British parliamentary election results 1918-1949 (3rd ed.). Chichester: Parliamentary Research Services. ISBN 0-900178-06-X.
- Leigh Rayment's Historical List of MPs
