= Charles MacAndrew, 1st Baron MacAndrew =

Scottish Unionist politician

The Right Honourable Charles MacAndrew, 1st Baron MacAndrew PC, DL, TD

Deputy Speaker of the House of Commons Chairman of Ways and Means
- In office 7 November 1951 – 8 October 1959
- Speaker: William Morrison
- Preceded by: James Milner
- Succeeded by: Gordon Touche

Deputy Chairman of Ways and Means
- In office 7 March 1950 – 7 November 1951
- Speaker: Douglas Clifton Brown; William Morrison
- Preceded by: Frank Bowles
- Succeeded by: Rhys Hopkin Morris
- In office 30 May 1945 – 16 August 1945
- Speaker: Douglas Clifton Brown
- Preceded by: Charles Williams
- Succeeded by: Hubert Beaumont

Member of Parliament for Bute and Northern Ayrshire
- In office 14 November 1935 – 18 September 1959
- Preceded by: Aylmer Hunter-Weston
- Succeeded by: Fitzroy Maclean

Member of Parliament for Glasgow Partick
- In office 27 October 1931 – 25 October 1935
- Preceded by: Adam McKinlay
- Succeeded by: Sir Arthur Young

Member of Parliament for Kilmarnock
- In office 29 October 1924 – 10 May 1929
- Preceded by: Robert Climie
- Succeeded by: Robert Climie

Personal details
- Born: Charles Glen MacAndrew; 13 January 1888 Ayrshire
- Died: 11 January 1979 (aged 90)
- Party: Unionist
- Other political affiliations: Conservative
- Education: Uppingham School
- Alma mater: Trinity College, Cambridge

Charles Glen MacAndrew, 1st Baron MacAndrew, PC, DL, TD (13 January 1888 – 11 January 1979) was a Scottish Unionist politician.

== Early life and career ==
Born in Ayrshire, he was educated at Uppingham School and at Trinity College, Cambridge.

== Political career ==
MacAndrew was elected at the 1924 general election as Member of Parliament (MP) for the Kilmarnock constituency in Ayrshire, and held the seat until his defeat at the 1929 general election. He stood unsuccessfully in the Kilmarnock by-election in November 1929, but was returned to the House of Commons at the 1931 general election for Glasgow Partick, and in 1935 for Bute and Northern Ayrshire, holding that seat until he retired from the Commons in 1959.

He was Deputy Chairman of Ways and Means, House of Commons, from May to July 1945 and from March 1950 to October 1951, and a Deputy Speaker of the House of Commons and Chairman of Ways and Means from 1951 to 1959.

He commanded the Ayrshire Yeomanry from 1932 to 1936 and was Honorary Colonel from 1951 to 1955. He was knighted in the 1935 Birthday Honours, appointed a Privy Counsellor in 1952 and was raised to the peerage as Baron MacAndrew in 1959.

Parliament of the United Kingdom
Preceded by Robert Climie	Member of Parliament for Kilmarnock; 1924–1929	Succeeded by Robert Climie
Preceded by Adam McKinlay	Member of Parliament for Glasgow Partick; 1931–1935	Succeeded by Sir Arthur Young
Preceded by Aylmer Hunter-Weston	Member of Parliament for Bute and Northern Ayrshire; 1935–1959	Succeeded by Fitzroy Maclean
Peerage of the United Kingdom
New creation	Baron MacAndrew; 1959–1979	Succeeded by Colin MacAndrew
