= Robert Climie =

British politician (1868–1929)

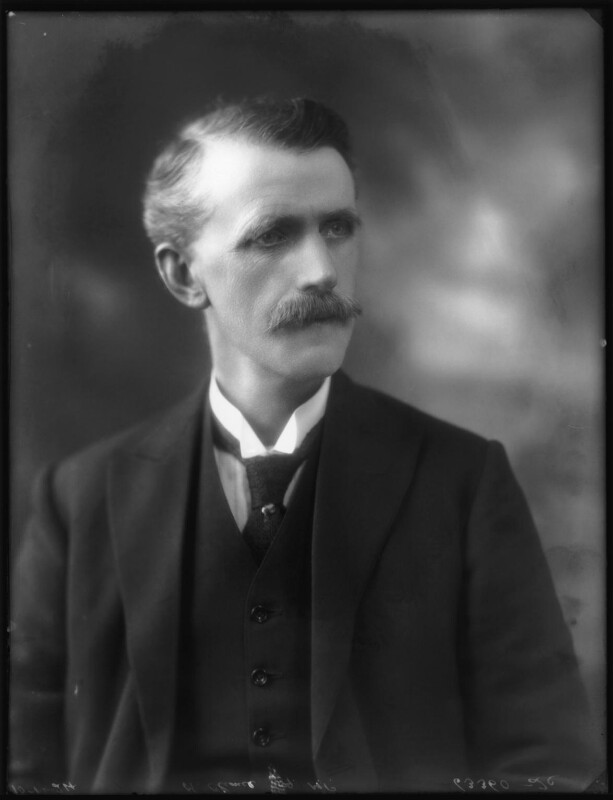
Climie in 1924

Robert Climie (4 January 1868 – 3 October 1929) was a Scottish trade unionist and Labour Party politician.

Robert was born in Kilmarnock, Scotland, on 4 January 1868. He was the son of bonnet weaver Mary McGarvie and underground colliery fireman, Robert Climie. He was educated at the local Board School and served his apprenticeship in engineering at the Britannia Works, where he continued to work as a journeyman. Early in his career he became involved in trade union activity and joined the Independent Labour Party (ILP). Despite previously being a Volunteer Sergeant in the Royal Scots Fusiliers, when he became involved in socialist politics he opposed the Boer War and spoke out regularly against it at the ILP's outdoor meetings from 1899–1902. He was first elected as a local councillor for the ILP in 1905 and served for many years, with particular interest in public health and housing.

As a nominee of Ayrshire Trades Council, he was a member of the Scottish Trades Union Congress's Parliamentary Committee from 1910 to 1918 and from 1920 to 1923, and was Secretary to the Committee in 1914.

He was elected to Parliament at the 1923 general election as Member of Parliament (MP) for Kilmarnock, having unsuccessfully contested the seat in 1922.

He was narrowly defeated at the 1924 general election, but won the seat back again at the general election in May 1929. However, he was already in poor health by this time and he died in office later that year, aged 61. He was survived by his wife, Jeannie McIldowie Meikle, herself an active Labour Party worker, six sons and a daughter.

He was an excellent speaker and formidable debater. In an obituary in the Kilmarnock Standard, 1929, he is described as...

...a small man of medium build, with dark hair and moustache, blue eyes and a fresh complexion. He was moderate in all things, always hard-working in the labour cause and a lifelong supporter of Ramsay MacDonald. Climie was teetotal although never formally attached to the temperance movement.

In Kilmarnock, Scotland there is a street, "Climie Place" named in his memory.

Parliament of the United Kingdom
Preceded by Alexander Shaw	Member of Parliament for Kilmarnock; 1923–1924	Succeeded by Charles MacAndrew
Preceded by Charles MacAndrew	Member of Parliament for Kilmarnock; May 1929–Oct 1929	Succeeded by Craigie Aitchison
Trade union offices
Preceded by Alexander R. Turner	President of the Scottish Trades Union Congress; 1914	Succeeded by David Gilmour
