= James Mitchell (Scottish minister) =

Scottish minister and social organiser

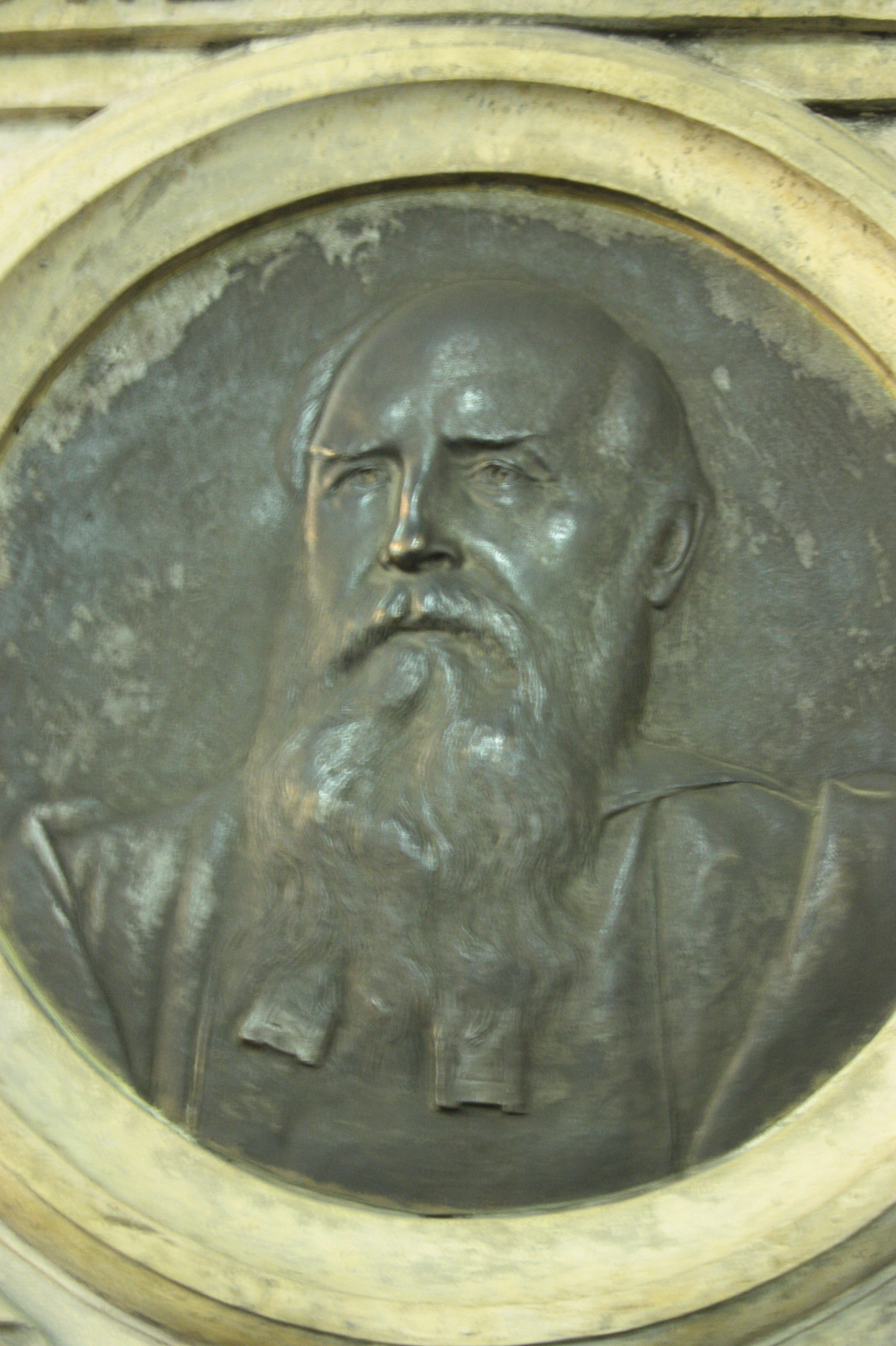
Plaque to Very Rev James Mitchell, South Leith Parish Church

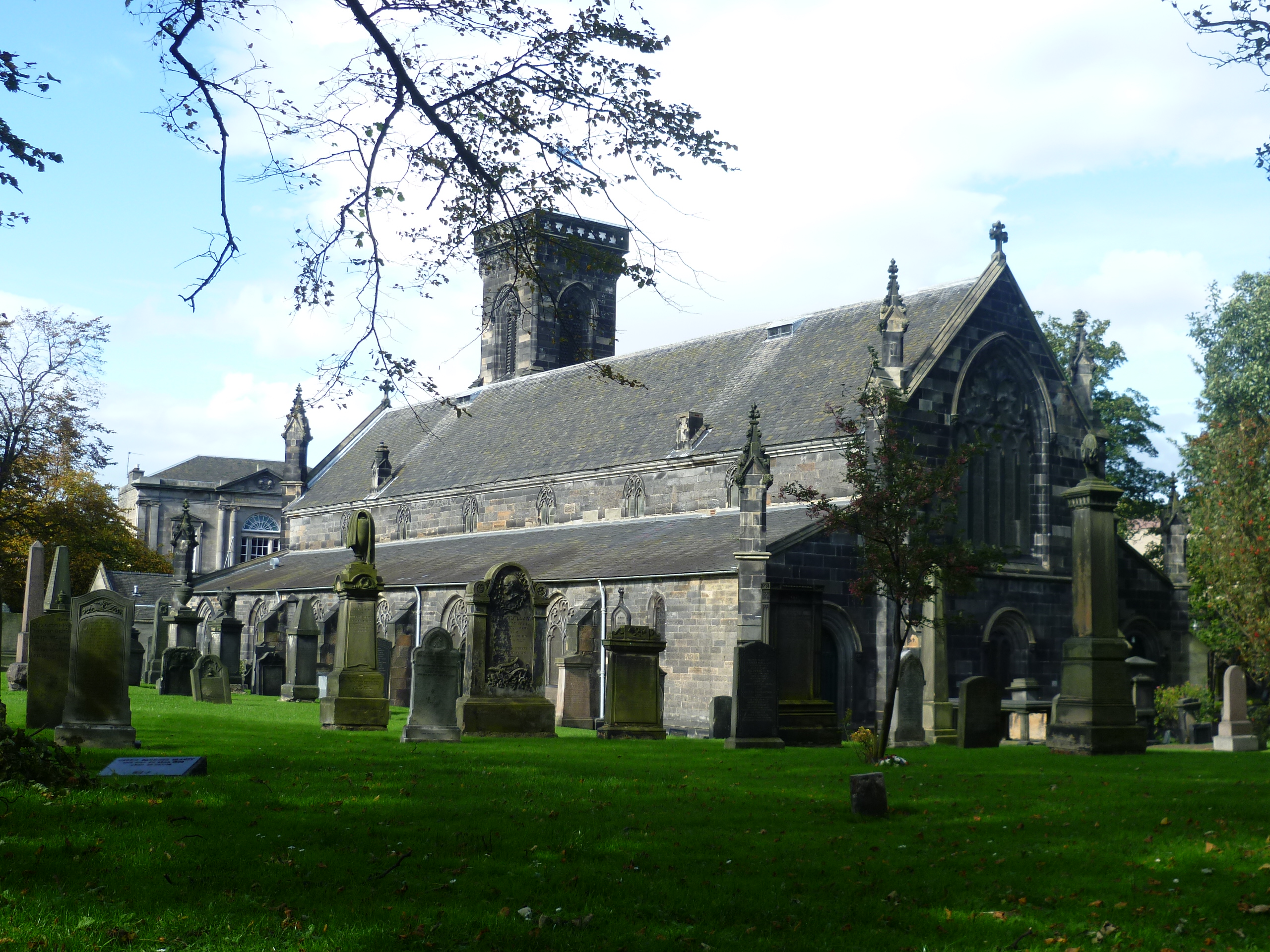
South Leith Parish Church from Constitution Street

James Mitchell (1830–1911) was a Scottish minister and social organiser. He served as Moderator of the General Assembly of the Church of Scotland in 1901.

== Life ==
He was born on 5 October 1830 in the manse, Garvock in northern Scotland the son of Rev James Mitchell, the local minister, and his wife, Margaret Gordon.

He was educated by Dr James Melvin at Aberdeen Grammar School. He entered Marischal College in 1846 studying Moral Philosophy and Logic, graduating MA in 1850. He then entered Divinity Hall in Aberdeen and studied Systematic Theology, Biblical Criticism and Theology for a further four years. In May 1854 he was licensed to preach by the Presbytery of Fordoun, but almost immediately thereafter (July) was ordained as Rev Dr Barry's assistant at St Enoch's Church in Glasgow. In 1855 he moved again to Deer Church in Peterhead. He settled there for several years but in 1864 was selected to take join South Leith Parish Church, then one of the most populated single parishes in Scotland, and a collegiate church (various ministers sharing the large task). He was "first charge" and was assisted by Rev Henry Duff in "second charge".

In 1872, following the Education Act of that year, the Dr Bells School in Leith became thereafter funded by the state and its previous endowment became unused. Mitchell organised for these funds to be redirected to create a Navigation School on Commercial Street. In the same year he organised a free soup kitchen and the building of Leith Model Lodging House (for homeless men) on Parliament Street. In 1888, linked to the Leith Improvement Scheme of that year, Mitchell organised for the owners of the various villa owners, around Leith Links to plant trees around the newly improved park.

He served on the Educational and Charitable Boards of Leith and was Chairman of the Leith Hospital Board. He travelled widely and was Convenor of the Continental Chaplaincy Committee. In 1881 Aberdeen University granted him an honorary doctorate (DD).

In 1901, at the very advanced age of 71, he was elected Moderator of the General Assembly of the Church of Scotland in succession to Rev Norman MacLeod of Inverness.

In 1903 (along with the Very Rev John Pagan) he was one of the several former Moderators invited to the official coronation of King Edward VII.

He retired in 1904 aged 74 and died on 21 September 1911 aged 80. at home, 14 Abercomby Place in Edinburgh's New Town. He is buried in the northern Victorian extension to Dean Cemetery on the main east-west path. His wife Janet Stewart Sceales of Leith, lies with him.

A memorial to Mitchell was added in the south-east corner of South Leith Parish Church in 1912, designed by Sir Robert Lorimer. His position at South Leith was filled by Rev John White.

== Family ==
He married three times; firstly to Janet Georgina Skelton, daughter of James Skelton, sheriff substitute of Peterhead, and sister of Sir John Skelton. The wedding took place at Sandford Lodge, Peterhead, on 7 September 1859, but she died the following year. His second wife Catherine Haycock, daughter of Rev Charles Haycock of Pytchley House in Northamptonshire, died in 1867. In 1875, he married his third wife, Janet Stewart Sceales daughter of James Sceales of Leith.

His brother was the missionary John Murray Mitchell who lived with James in his final years and is buried beside him.

== Publications ==
- The Church and The People
- Rulers and Subjects
- The Voluntary Question
- The Revised Version
- Faithfulness in Little Things
- The Minister in the Manse, the Pulpit, and the Parish
- Significant Etymology

== Gallery ==
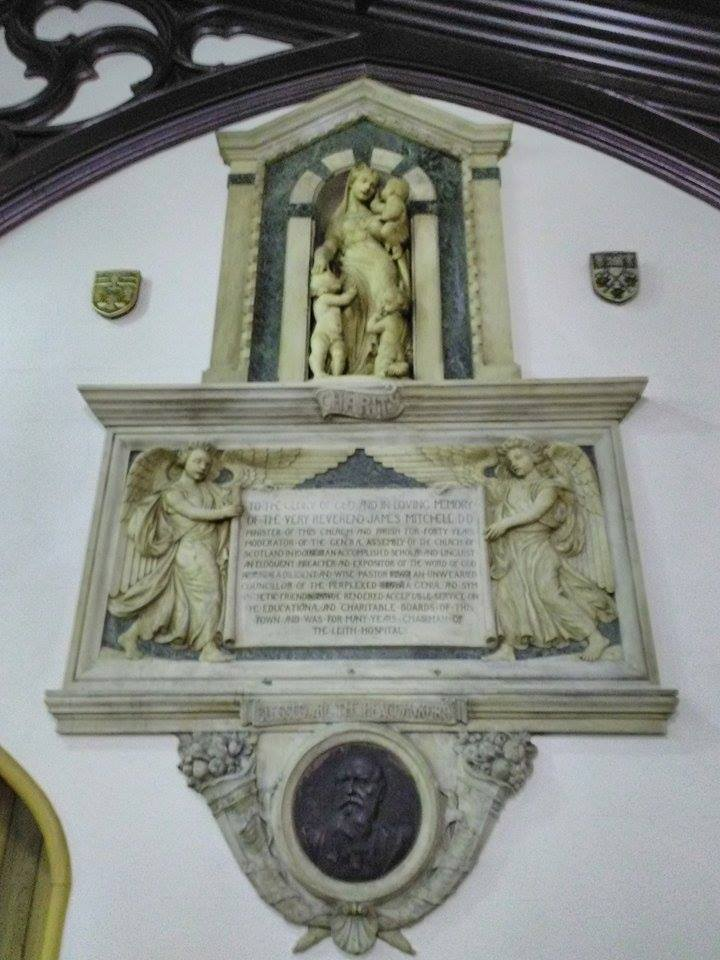
Monument to Rev James Mitchell, South Leith Parish Church

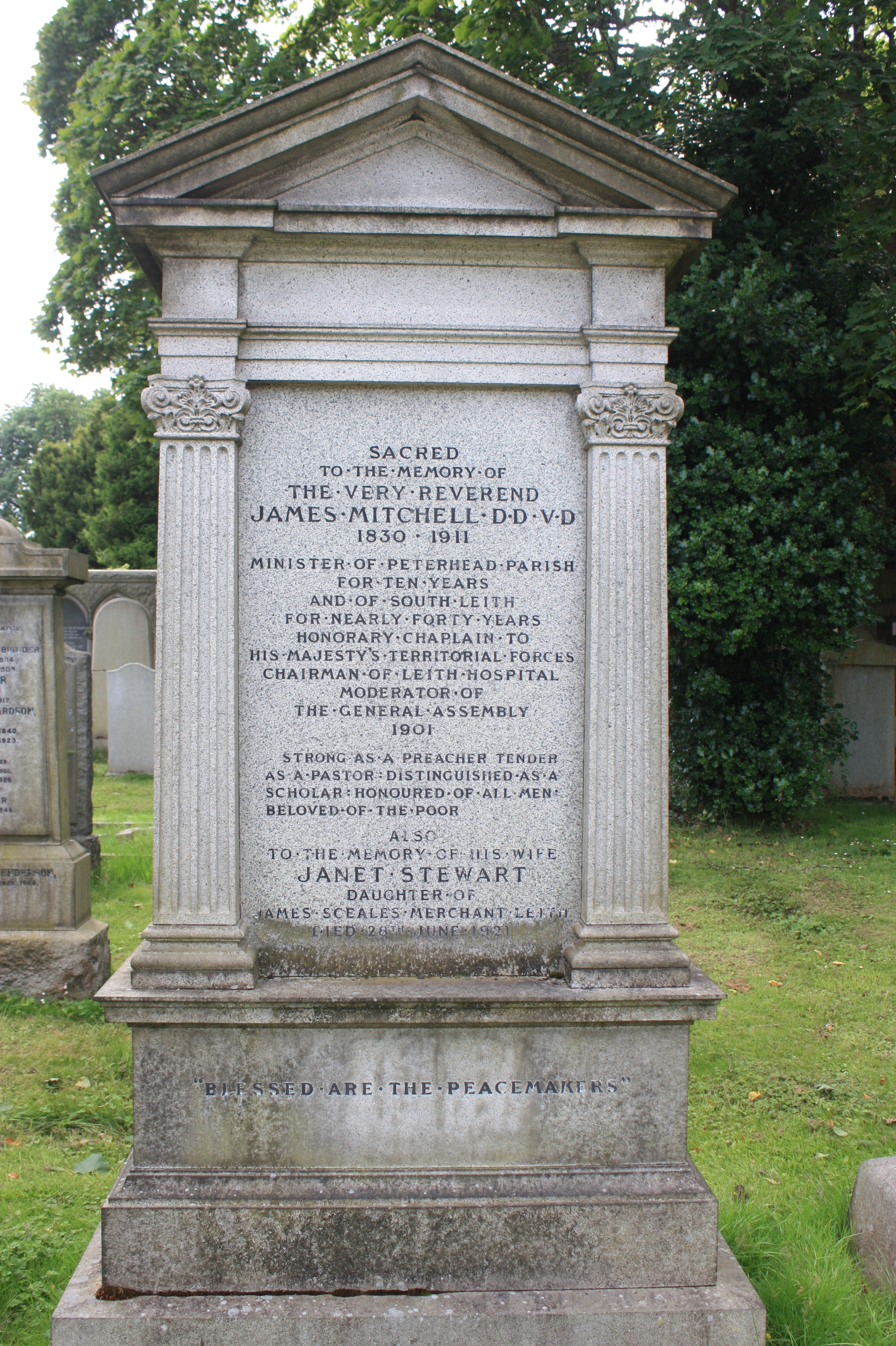
The grave of Very Rev James Mitchell, Dean Cemetery, Edinburgh
