= Anne Warner (scientist) =

British biologist

Anne Warner FRS
- Warner in her laboratory (early 1990s)
- Born: Anne Elizabeth Brooks; 25 August 1940
- Died: 16 May 2012 (aged 71)
- Education: University of London (PhD)
- Scientific career
- Fields: Electrophysiology
- Workplaces: University College London
- Thesis: The effect of pH on the membrane conductance of skeletal muscle (1964)
- Doctoral advisor: Otto Hutter

Anne E. Warner FRS (25 August 1940 – 16 May 2012) was a British biologist and a professor in the Department of Cell and Developmental Biology at University College London. Her major field of research was morphogenesis. Warner was known for her work and leadership in a variety of research projects and organisations. She is perhaps most well known for her roles as a cell electrophysiologist, politician of science, and founder of the organisation UCL centre CoMPLEX.

== Education ==
Born Anne Elizabeth Brookes on 25 August 1940 at Golders Green, she was the only child of Elizabeth (née Marshall) and James Frederick Crompton Brooks (1914–1996), an engineer in the Ministry of Aircraft Production. She was educated at Pate's Grammar School for Girls in Cheltenham, going on to study at University College London where she graduated with a BSc in physiology. She studied for her PhD at the National Institute for Medical Research under the supervision of Otto Hutter, receiving her doctorate in 1964 at the age of 23. That same year she took up a staff position at the Institute and began research into the effect of pH on skeletal muscle chloride conductance.

== Research ==
Warner was a participant and leader in a wide variety of research projects, and is best known for her work into the role of gap junctions in embryological development, which she began to pursue during the late 1970s following her research at the National Institute for Medical Research. For the last 20 years before Warner began her research on gap junctions, embryologists had been working hard to prove that gap junctions were the means through which cells communicated and associated into tissues during embryological development. Warner, along with her colleague Sarah Guthrie, was said to have ended this journey with her discovery and conclusions. While working with the embryos of frogs, Warner observed "electrical coupling" between adjacent cells, meaning that an induced change in the resting voltage of one cell resulted in a corresponding change in an adjacent cell, which demonstrated the fact that junctions between the cells are responsible for transporting ions from one location to the next. However, Warner noticed that the gap junctions appeared to be present during some developmental stages, but not others.

To prove the essential role of these gap junctions in embryological development, Warner conducted experiments during the 1980s to block these junctions and observe the resulting effects. Using the 8-cell-embryos of the African clawed frog, Xenopus, she used antibody injections to block the channels in the connections of the gap junctions. After injecting the embryos with a specific antibody, which was said to have blocked the channels of gap junctions, Warner confirmed the blockage of the channels by injecting dyes into the cells in addition to confirming the lack of electrical coupling that she observed in earlier experiments.

After confirming the successful blocking of the gap junctions in the 8-cell-embryos, Warner continued to grow the embryos and took note that due to the blockage of the gap junctions, development of the toads was abnormal. Thus, Warner was the scientist responsible for confirming the crucial role of gap junction in the successful and normal development of cells from embryos to mature organisms. Through this discovery, Warner contributed to the growing research on the process of cell proliferation and maturation from an embryo to a fully functioning organism.

== Career ==
In addition to her research, Warner was involved in many scientific organisations, often in a leadership role. She was a member of NERC, the Marine Biological Association of the United Kingdom, the Lister Institute of Preventive Medicine, the Roslin Institute, the editorial board of The Journal of Physiology, the Committee of The Physiological Society, and many Medical Research Council boards and policy committees. In 1976, Warner returned to her alma mater, University College London, after being a lecturer at the Royal Free Hospital School of Medicine. Throughout her years of work at the university, Warner held several positions including the position of Reader at the Department of Anatomy and Developmental Biology and Royal Society Foulerton Professor, an honour she received in 1986. In addition, Warner was elected a Fellow of the Royal Society in 1985. Of all of the organisations and leadership roles that Warner was involved in, she is perhaps most well known for her role as vice-president of the Marine Biological Association (MBA) council and Director of the CoMPLEX (Centre of Mathematics, Physics, and Life Sciences) at the University College London. With Warner's role in the MBA, she is partially responsible for the organisation's survival and legacy to this day. Among many of the programs that Warner initiated in the organisation, she founded the cell physiology Workshop in 1984, which was responsible for creating many cell physiologist cohorts across the world. As director of the UCL CoMPLEX during its infantile stages, Warner was a co-founder of the organisation and fostered its development during her many years as its leader. As the leader of the organisation, Warner brought together a variety of different scientists to work towards the common goal of developing the field of biology. The organisation became an example and model for similar organisations in other countries. Her work with the organisations that she was involved in created a lasting legacy through her many programs that are still used today.

== Personal life ==
Warner met her husband Michael while they were both members of the stage crew at University College London. Her husband predeceased her by a few weeks.

Her health declined after a heart valve replacement that her body did not accept well, and at this time she was no longer able to be physically involved in the many organisations that she was a part of. However, she remained in communication with the organisations and gave them advice throughout the time of her illness. After an extended illness she died on 16 May 2012 at University College Hospital, Camden, of a cerebral haemorrhage. Upon her death, one particular colleague of the UCL wrote an article about Warner which demonstrated her personality that enabled her to reach many of her goals in life. Warner was known as a formidable lady who brought together her colleagues through her perseverance and motivation to solve problems. Through her efforts, Warner dedicated her life to making a difference in her field of research and the many organisations that she was a part of.
