= John Boyd Orr =

British teacher (1880–1971)

The Right Honourable The Lord Boyd-Orr
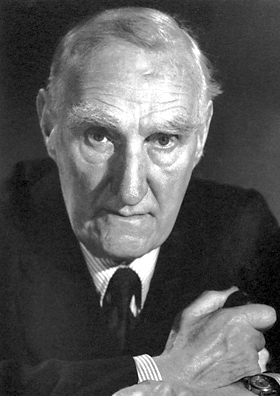
- Born: John Boyd Orr; 23 September 1880; Kilmaurs, Ayrshire, Scotland
- Died: 25 June 1971 (aged 90); Edzell, Angus, Scotland
- Education: Kilmarnock Academy; University of Glasgow
- Known for: Wartime nutrition
- Spouse: Elizabeth Pearson Callum (m. 1915)
- Children: 3
- Awards: Bellahouston Gold Medal; Elected FRSE, 1924; Elected FRS, 1932; Knighted, 1935; Nobel Peace Prize, 1949
- Scientific career
- Fields: Biology; Medicine; Nutritional physiology
- Workplaces: University of Glasgow; Rowett Research Institute, University of Aberdeen; Food and Agriculture Organization
- Academic advisors: E. P. Cathcart

John Boyd Orr, 1st Baron Boyd-Orr, CH DSO MC FRS FRSE (23 September 1880 – 25 June 1971), styled Sir John Boyd Orr from 1935 to 1949, was a British teacher, medical doctor, biologist, nutritional physiologist, politician, businessman and farmer who was awarded the Nobel Peace Prize for his scientific research into nutrition and his work as the first Director-General of the United Nations Food and Agriculture Organization (FAO).

He was the co-founder and the first President (1960–1971) of the World Academy of Art and Science (WAAS). In 1945, he was elected President of the National Peace Council and was President of the World Union of Peace Organisations and the World Movement for World Federal Government.

== Early life and family background ==
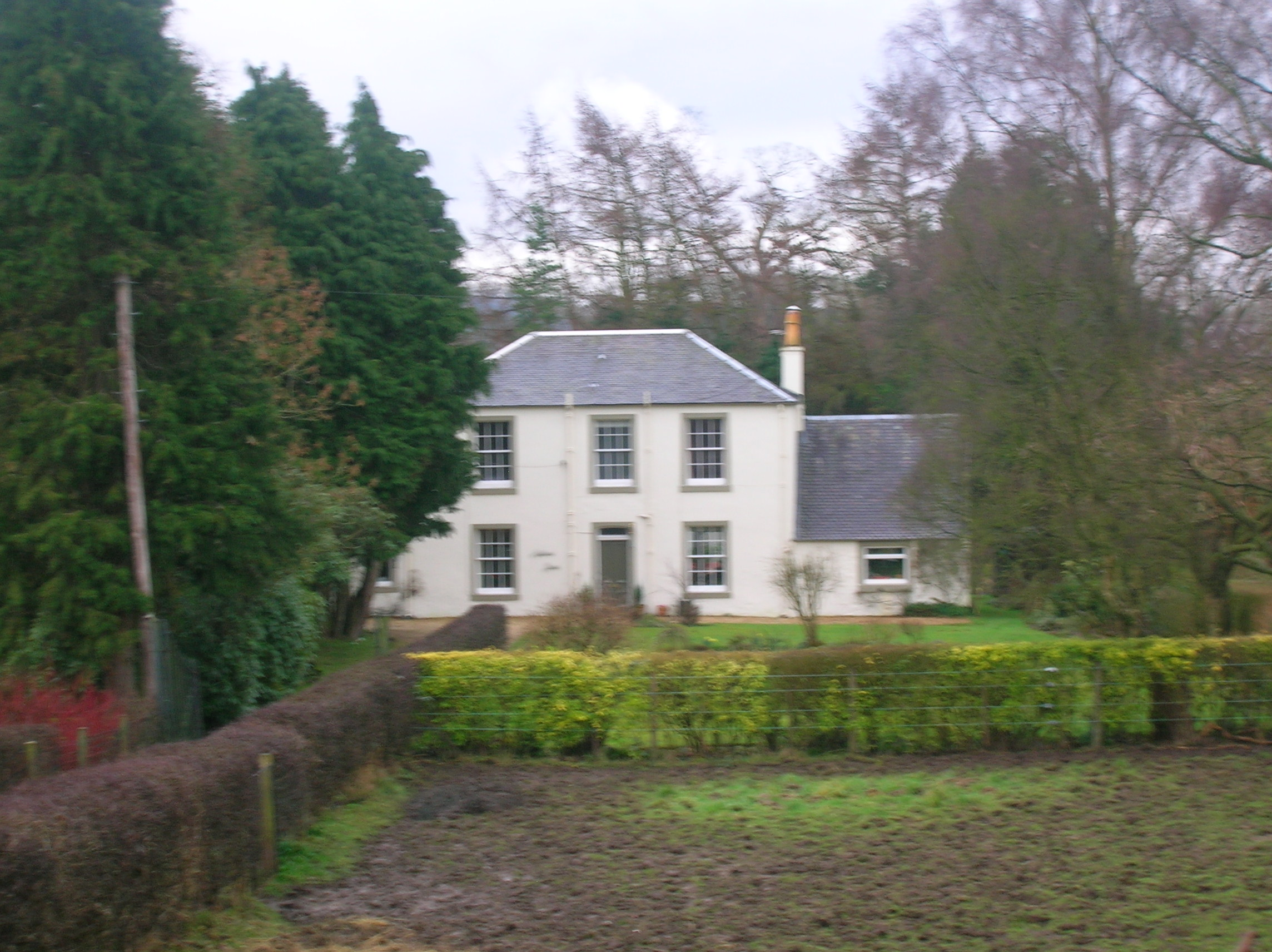
The birthplace of John Boyd Orr: Holland Green, Fenwick Road, Kilmaurs.

John Boyd Orr was born at Kilmaurs, near Kilmarnock, East Ayrshire, Scotland, the middle child in a family of seven children. His father, Robert Clark Orr, was a quarry owner, and a man of deep religious convictions, being a member of the Free Church of Scotland. His mother, Annie Boyd, was the daughter of another quarry master, wealthier than Robert Orr, and Past Master of a Masonic lodge.

He was taught to read at an early age by his widowed grandmother, who lived with the family. The family home was well supplied with books, and his father was widely read in political, sociological and metaphysical subjects, as well as religion. As he grew older, John would regularly discuss these subjects with his father, brothers, and visiting friends.

When he was five years old, the family suffered a setback when a ship owned by Robert Orr was lost at sea. They had to sell their home in Kilmaurs, and moved to West Kilbride, a village on the North Ayrshire coast. According to Kay, the new house and environment were a great improvement on Kilmaurs, despite the family's reduced means. The major part of his upbringing took place in and around West Kilbride. Apart from a four-month break at age thirteen, he attended the village school until age nineteen, the last four years as a pupil-teacher. Religion was then an important part of junior education in Scotland, and the school gave him a good knowledge of the Bible, which stayed with him for the rest of his life, though he would ultimately shed the religious beliefs of his childhood.

At the age of 13, Boyd Orr won a bursary to Kilmarnock Academy, a significant achievement as such bursaries were then rare. The new school was some 20 miles (32 km) from his home in West Kilbride, but his father owned a quarry about two miles (3 km) from the academy, and John was provided with accommodation nearby. His family cut short his education at the academy because, at the expense of his school attendance, he was spending time with the quarry workers, who let him work the machinery, and from whom he picked up a "wonderful vocabulary of swear words". After four months he returned to the village school in West Kilbride where he continued his education under the inspirational tutelage of Headmaster John G. Lyons. There he became a pupil teacher at a salary of £10 for the first year, and £20 for the second. This was a particularly demanding time for the young Boyd Orr, as in addition to his teaching duties, and studying at home for his university entrance and teacher-training qualifications, he also had to work every day in his father's business.

== University of Glasgow ==
After four years as a pupil-teacher, at the age of 19, he won a Queen's Scholarship to study at a teacher training college in Glasgow, plus a bursary which paid for his lodgings there. The course required attending classes at the college, in addition to following the three-year Arts course, based on classics, at the university. As Boyd Orr had passed his university entrance examinations, the fees for the university were also covered. The university education was considered the more important part of the course.

Boyd Orr criticised the university course because the hard work required to pass the exams did not allow sufficient time to meet and to discuss with students of different social backgrounds. (Note: "As an example of this – from the time I was a boy of fourteen my nose had been rubbed in Shakespeare's works. I had been forced to learn long passages by heart, to write essays and to annotate. As a result, I have never read a play by Shakespeare." (Boyd Orr 1966, p. 42)) Away from home for the first time, it was at the University of Glasgow that Boyd Orr left behind the strict religious regime of his youth, later writing that Darwinian evolutionary theory broke the hold of biblical teachings.

== First encounters with poverty and teaching career ==
As an undergraduate in Glasgow, he explored the interior of the city, usually at weekends. He was shocked by what he found in the poverty-stricken slums and tenements, which then made up a large part of the city. Rickets was obvious among the children, malnutrition (in some cases, associated with drunkenness) was shown by many of the adults, and many of the aged were destitute. In his first teaching job after graduating MA in 1902, he was posted to a school in the slums. His first class was overcrowded and the children ill-fed or actually hungry, inadequately clothed, infested with lice and physically wretched. He resigned after a few days since he realised that he could not teach children in such a condition and that there was nothing he could do to relieve their misery.

After working for a few months in his father's business, he taught for three years at Kyleshill School in Saltcoats, also a poor area, but less squalid than the slums of Glasgow. Boyd Orr needed to augment his teacher's salary, and decided to do so by instructing an evening class in book-keeping and accountancy. After intensive study he passed the necessary examinations, and duly instructed his class. The knowledge and skills he learned by studying for and teaching this class were to prove useful in his later career.

== Return to university ==
Boyd Orr realised that his heart was not in teaching, and after fulfilling his teaching obligations under the terms of his Queen's Scholarship, he returned to the university to study biology, a subject he had always been interested in since childhood. As a precaution, he entered simultaneously for a degree in medicine.

He found the university to be a stimulating environment. Diarmid Noel Paton (son of the artist Joseph Noel Paton) was Regius Professor of Physiology, and Edward Provan Cathcart head of Physiological Chemistry, both men of outstanding scientific ability. He was impressed by Samson Gemmell, Professor of Clinical Medicine, a philosopher whose deep thinking on social affairs also influenced Boyd Orr's approach to such questions.

Half-way through his medical studies, his savings ran out. Reluctant to ask his family for support, he bought a block of tenanted flats on mortgage, with the help of a bank overdraft, and used the rents to pay for the rest of his studies. On graduating, he sold the property for a small profit.

He graduated with a BSc in 1910, and MB ChB in 1912, at the age of 32, placing sixth in a year of 200 students. Two years later, in 1914, he graduated MD with honours, receiving the Bellahouston Gold Medal for the most distinguished thesis of the year.

.

== Research career ==
On leaving the university, he took a position as a ship's surgeon on a ship trading between Scotland and West Africa, choosing this job because it offered the possibility of paying off his bank overdraft faster than any other. He resigned after four months, when he had repaid the debt. He then tried general practice, working as a locum in the practice of his family doctor in Saltcoats, and was offered a partnership there. Realising that a career in medicine was not for him, he instead accepted the offer of a two-year Carnegie research scholarship, to work in E. P. Cathcart's laboratory. The work he began there covered malnutrition, protein and creatine metabolism, the effect of water intake on nitrogenous metabolism in humans, and the energy expenditure of military recruits in training.

=== The beginnings of the Rowett Research Institute ===
On 1 April 1914, Boyd Orr took charge of a new research institute in Aberdeen, a project of a joint committee for research into animal nutrition of the North of Scotland College of Agriculture and the University of Aberdeen. He had been offered the post on the recommendation of E. P. Cathcart, who had originally been offered the job, but had turned it down in favour of a chair in physiology in London.

The joint committee had allocated a budget of £5,000 for capital expenditure and £1,500 for annual running costs. Boyd Orr recognised immediately that these sums were inadequate. Using his experience in his father's business of drawing up plans and estimating costs, he submitted a budget of £50,000 for capital expenditure and £5,000 for annual running costs. Meanwhile, with the £5,000 he had already been allocated he specified a building, not of wood as had been envisaged by the committee, but of granite and designed so that it could serve as a wing of his proposed £50,000 Institute. He accepted the lowest tender of £5,030, and told the contractors to begin work immediately. The committee were not pleased, but had to accept the fait accompli. When war broke out the contractors were told to finish the walls and roof, but to do no more for the time being.

=== War service (1914–1918) ===
On the outbreak of the First World War he was given leave to join the British Army, and asked his former colleague E. P. Cathcart to help him obtain a medical commission in an infantry unit overseas. Cathcart thought he would be more useful at home, and his first commission was in a special civilian section of the RAMC dealing with sanitation. Several divisions of non-conscripted recruits were in training in emergency camps at home, some of them in poor sanitary conditions. Boyd Orr was able to push through schemes for improvement in hygiene, preventing much sickness.

After 18 months he was posted as Medical Officer to an infantry unit, the 1st battalion Sherwood Foresters. He spent much of his time in shell holes, patching up the many wounded. His courage under fire and devotion to duty were recognised by the award of a Military Cross after the Battle of the Somme, and of the Distinguished Service Order after Passchendaele. He also made arrangements for the battalion's diet to be supplemented by vegetables collected from local deserted gardens and fields. As a result, unlike other units, he did not need to send any of the men in his medical charge to hospital. He also prevented his men getting trench foot by personally ensuring they were fitted with boots a size larger than usual. He was appointed a Captain in the RAMC with effect from 5 May 1918, having previously been a temporary Captain.

Worried that he was losing touch with medical and nutritional advances, he asked to be transferred to the navy, where he thought he would have more time available for reading and research. The army was reluctant to let him go, but agreed, since he was still a civilian surgeon. He spent a busy three months in the naval hospital at Chatham, studying hard while practicing medicine in the wards, before being posted to HMS Furious. On board ship his medical duties were light, enabling him to do a great deal of reading. He was later recalled to work studying food requirements of the army.

=== Post-war expansion of the Rowett Research Institute ===
When Boyd Orr returned to Aberdeen in early 1919, his plan for a larger Institute had still not been accepted. Indeed, even his plans for the annual maintenance grant had to be approved by the Professor of Agriculture in Cambridge, Thomas Barlow Wood. Despite gaining the latter's support, his expansion plans were at first rebuffed, although he succeeded in having the annual grant increased to £4,000. In 1920 he was introduced to John Quiller Rowett, a businessman who seemed to have qualms of conscience over the large profits he had made during the war. Shortly afterwards, the government agreed to finance half the cost of Boyd Orr's plan, provided he could raise the other half elsewhere. Rowett agreed to provide £10,000 for the first year, £10,000 for the second year, and gave an additional £2,000 for the purchase of a farm, provided that, "if any work done at the Institute on animal nutrition was found to have a bearing on human nutrition, the Institute would be allowed to follow up this work", a condition the Treasury was willing to accept. By September 1922 the buildings were nearly completed, and the renamed Rowett Research Institute was opened shortly thereafter by Queen Mary.

Boyd Orr proved to be an effective fund-raiser from both government and private sources, expanding the experimental farm to around 1,000 acres (400 hectares), building a well-endowed library, and expanding the buildings. He also built a centre for accommodating students and scientists attracted by the institute's growing reputation, a reputation enhanced by Boyd Orr's many publications. His research output suffered from the time and energy he had to devote to fund-raising, and in later life he said, "I still look with bitter resentment at having to spend half my time in the humiliating job of hunting for money for the Institute."

Through the 1920s, his own research was devoted mainly to animal nutrition, his focus changed to human nutrition both as a researcher and an active lobbyist and propagandist for improving people's diets. Isabella Leitch had been employed as a temporary librarian but she was soon his assistant where she spread "the gospel according to Sir John". In 1927, Boyd Orr proved the value of milk being supplied to school children, which led to free school milk provision in the UK. His 1936 report "Food, Health and Income" showed that at least one third of the UK population were so poor that they could not afford to buy sufficient food to provide a healthy diet and revealed that there was a link between low-income, malnutrition and under-achievement in schools. He was appointed a member of the short-lived Livestock Commission under the Livestock Industry Act 1937 in 1937.

From 1929 to 1944, Boyd Orr was Consultant Director to the Imperial Bureau of Animal Nutrition, later the Commonwealth Bureau of Nutrition (part of the Commonwealth Agricultural Bureaux), which was based at the Rowett Research Institute. During the Second World War he was a member of Churchill's Scientific Committee on Food Policy and helped to formulate food rationing

Boyd Orr was knighted in the 1935 New Year Honours for services to agriculture.

== International and political work ==
In October 1945, Orr was elected Rector of the University of Glasgow after standing as an Independent Progressive candidate. He was elected as an independent Member of Parliament (MP) for the Combined Scottish Universities in a by-election in April 1945, and kept his seat at the general election shortly after. He resigned in 1946.

After the Second World War, Boyd Orr resigned from the Rowett Institute, and took several posts, most notably as Director-General of the United Nations' new Food and Agriculture Organization (FAO). Although his tenure in this position was short (1945–1948), he worked not only to alleviate the immediate postwar food shortage through the International Emergency Food Committee (IEFC) but also to propose comprehensive plans for improving food production and its equitable distribution. His proposal to create a World Food Board to increase price stability by way of large scale commodity storage. Although the board failed to get the support of Britain and the US, Boyd Orr laid a firm foundation for the new UN-specialized agency.

He then resigned from the FAO and became director of a number of companies and proved a canny investor in the stock market, making a considerable personal fortune. When he received the Nobel Peace Prize in 1949, (Note: The American Friends Service Committee was one of his nominators for the Nobel Prize (AFSC Nobel Nominations).) he donated the entire financial award to organizations devoted to world peace and a united world government. He was elevated to the peerage in the 1949 New Year Honours as Baron Boyd-Orr, of Brechin Mearn in the County of Angus.

In 1957, Boyd Orr served as president of the Second International Humanist Congress, and contributed to the 1968 volume The Humanist Outlook alongside many other prominent humanists.

In 1960 Boyd Orr was elected the first president of the World Academy of Art and Science, which was set up by eminent scientists of the day concerned about the potential misuse of scientific discoveries, most especially nuclear weapons.

Along with Albert Einstein, Orr was one of the sponsors of the Peoples' World Convention (PWC), also known as Peoples' World Constituent Assembly (PWCA), which took place in 1950–51 at Palais Electoral, Geneva, Switzerland. He was also one of the signatories of the agreement to convene a convention for drafting a world constitution. As a result, for the first time in human history, a World Constituent Assembly convened to draft and adopt the Constitution for the Federation of Earth.

Boyd Orr was a member of Bertrand Russell's Who Killed Kennedy? Committee which challenged the official version of the assassination of John F. Kennedy.

== Personal life ==
In 1915, Boyd Orr married Elizabeth Pearson Callum, whom he had met as a teenager in West Kilbride. They had three children: Elizabeth Joan (born 1916), Helen Anne (born 1919) and Donald Noel (1921–1942). His son was killed on active service during the Second World War.

== Arms ==
Coat of arms of John Boyd Orr
Crest A dexter hand couped at the wrist with a dove rising her wings elevated holding in her beak an olive twig. Escutcheon Argent three piles conjoined in point Gules each charged with a wheat ear Or on a chief chequy of the second and first a pale Azure charged with an estoile of six rays of the first. Supporters Two wheat sheaves all Proper. Motto Panis Et Pax

== Death and legacy ==
Boyd Orr died on 25 June 1971 in Brechin, Scotland; he was 90 years old. His grave is at Stracathro Kirkyard, Angus.

The University of Glasgow's Boyd Orr Building and the Boyd Orr Centre for Population and Ecosystem Health are named after him, and the university's Hunterian Museum holds his Nobel Peace Prize medal.

There is a street named for Boyd Orr in his home town of Kilmaurs in Ayrshire, as well as others in Aberdeen, Brechin, Laurencekirk, Penicuik, Saltcoats and Strathaven. There is also a road named after him in Harare, Zimbabwe.

== Bibliography ==
- Boyd Orr, John (1905). Scotch Church Crisis: The Full Story of the Modern Phase of the Presbyterian Struggle. Glasgow: John M'Neilage.
- —————— (1929). Minerals in Pastures and Their Relation to Animal Nutrition. London: Lewis.
- —————— (1934). The National Food Supply and Its Influence on Public Health. London: King.
- —————— (1936). Food, Health and Income. London: Macmillan.
- —————— (1937). Nutritional Science and State Planning.in (Orr)
- —————— (1940). Nutrition in war. Fabian Tract 251. London: Fabian Society.
- —————— (1942). Fighting for What?. London: Macmillan.
- —————— (1943). Food and the People. London: Pilot Press.
- —————— (1945). Welfare and Peace. London: National Peace Council.
- —————— (1946). A Charter for Health. London: Allen & Unwin.
- —————— (1948). Food: The Foundation of World Unity. London: National Peace Council.
- —————— (1950). International Liaison Committee of Organisations for Peace: A New Strategy of Peace. London: National Peace Council.
- —————— (1957). Feast and famine: The wonderful world of food. London: Rathbone Books.
- —————— (1958). The Wonderful World of Food: The Substance of Life. Garden City, NY: Garden City Books.
- —————— (1966). As I recall: the 1880s to the 1960s. with an introduction by Ritchie Calder. London: MacGibbon & Kee.

with other authors

- Boyd Orr, John; Lubbock, David (1940). Feeding the people in war time. London: Macmillan – via Internet Archive.
- Boyd Orr, John; Lubbock, David (1964) [First published 1953]. The White Man's Dilemma: Food and the Future (2nd ed.). London: Allen & Unwin.
- Boyd Orr, John (1968). "The Undeveloped Countries". The Humanist Outlook. London: Pemberton Publishing Co. ISBN 9780301667645.
- Boyd Orr, John; Beck, Robert Nelson (1970). Ethical Choice. London: Free Press. ISBN 978-0-02-902070-8 – via Internet Archive.

== Sources ==
- "Boyd Orr Centre for Population and Ecosystem Health".
- Boyd Orr, J; Cathcart, E. P. (1919). The energy expenditure of infantry recruits in training. London: HMSO.
- Boyd Orr, John (June 1914). A contribution to the metabolism of creatine (M.D. thesis). University of Glasgow.
- Boyd Orr, John (12 December 1949). "Lord Boyd Orr: Nobel Lecture". Nobel Media AB. From Nobel Lectures, Peace 1926-1950, Editor Frederick W. Haberman, Elsevier Publishing Company, Amsterdam, 1972
- Boyd Orr, John; Burns, D. (19 September 1914). "The influence of excessive water ingestion on the excretion of creatine and creatinine". British Medical Journal.
- "Boyd-Orr of Brechin Mearns, John Boyd Orr, Baron". Encyclopædia Britannica. 2007.
- Cathcart, E. P.; Boyd Orr, John (1914). "The influence of acetoacetic acid on the estimation of creatinine" (PDF). The Journal of Physiology. 48: xxi–xxii. doi:10.1113/jphysiol.1914.sp001679. S2CID 222198195. Archived from the original (PDF) on 26 March 2009.
- Cathcart, E. P.; Orr, J. B. (1914). "The influence of carbohydrate and fat on protein metabolism: III. The effect of sodium selenite". The Journal of Physiology. 48 (2–3): 113–127. doi:10.1113/jphysiol.1914.sp001651. PMC 1420513. PMID 16993271.
- Cuthbertson, D. P. (2007). "Lord Boyd Orr (23 September 1880 to 25 June 1971)" (PDF). British Journal of Nutrition. 27 (1): 1–5. doi:10.1079/BJN19720063. PMID 4550999. S2CID 26509839.
- "Eliminating Hunger in the World. United Nations' Food Policy". The Herald. Glasgow. 1 December 1945. p. 2.
- "Former RSE Fellows 1783–2002" (PDF). Royal Society of Edinburgh.
- "General Information". Rowett Research Institute. 2005. Archived from the original on 29 December 2006.
- Jahn, Gunnar (10 December 1949). "Award ceremony speech". Nobel Media AB (published 2018).
- "John Boyd Orr biography". University of Glasgow. Archived from the original on 17 October 2021.
- Kay, H. D. (1972). "John Boyd Orr. Baron Boyd Orr of Brechin Mearns 1880–1971". Biographical Memoirs of Fellows of the Royal Society. 18: 43–81. doi:10.1098/rsbm.1972.0004. PMID 11615751.
- "Lord Boyd Orr – Biographical". Nobel Media AB. 2018.
- "Lord Boyd Orr, 90, F.A.O. Leader, Dies". The New York Times. 26 June 1971.
- "Lord Boyd Orr, CH, DSO, MC, LL.D, D.Sc, MD, FRSE, FRS". Obituary Notices. British Medical Journal. 3 (5765): 54–55. 3 July 1971. doi:10.1136/bmj.3.5765.54. S2CID 220196159.
- "Lord Boyd Orr: Scientist crusader for better nutrition". Obituary. The Times. No. 58209. London. 26 June 1971. p. 14.
- "Nobel Peace Prize Nominations". American Friends Service Committee. 14 April 2010. Archived from the original on 15 August 2008.
- Orr, J. B. (1914). "The Influence of Excessive Water Ingestion on Protein Metabolism". The Biochemical Journal. 8 (5): 530–540. doi:10.1042/bj0080530. PMC 1276600. PMID 16742337.
- Orr, John Boyd (ed.). What Science Stands For. London: Allen & Unwin.
- "Orr, John Boyd". Oxford Dictionary of National Biography (online ed.). Oxford University Press. 2004. doi:10.1093/ref:odnb/31519. (Subscription, Wikipedia Library access or UK public library membership required.)
- "Scots MP vacates seat". The Herald. Glasgow. 4 October 1946. p. 4.
- "Sir John Boyd Orr Chief of F.A.O". The Herald. Glasgow. 28 October 1945. p. 3.
- "Sir John Boyd Orr, M.P., Elected Rector of Glasgow University". The Herald. Glasgow. 22 October 1945. p. 4.
- Smith, David (1998). "The Agricultural Research Association, the Development Fund, and the Origins of the Rowett Research Institute" (PDF). Agricultural History Review. 46 (1): 47–63. Archived from the original (PDF) on 27 September 2007.
- Staples, Amy L. S. (October 2003). "To Win the Peace: The Food and Agriculture Organization, Sir John Boyd Orr, and the World Food Board Proposals". Peace & Change. 28 (4): 495–523. doi:10.1111/1468-0130.00273.
- Staples, Amy L. S. (2006). The Birth of Development: How the World Bank, Food and Agriculture Organization, and World Health Organization Changed the World, 1945-1965. Kent, OH: Kent State University Press. pp. 78–96. ISBN 978-0-87338-849-8.
- "Universities' New M.P. Sir John Orr's Victory". The Herald. Glasgow. 14 April 1945. p. 10.

Academic offices
Preceded by Sir Archibald Sinclair, Bt	Rector of the University of Glasgow; 1945–1947	Succeeded by Walter Elliot
Preceded by Sir Daniel Macaulay Stevenson	Chancellor of the University of Glasgow; 1946–1971	Succeeded by Sir Alexander Cairncross
Parliament of the United Kingdom
Preceded by George Alexander Morrison; Sir John Anderson; Sir John Kerr	Member of Parliament for Combined Scottish Universities; 1945–1946; With: Sir John Anderson; Sir John Kerr	Succeeded by Walter Elliot; Sir John Anderson; Sir John Kerr
Peerage of the United Kingdom
New creation	Baron Boyd-Orr; 1949–1971	Extinct
Awards and achievements
Vacant Title last held by Friends Service Council; American Friends Service Committee	Laureate of the Nobel Peace Prize; 1949	Succeeded by Ralph Bunche
