= John Murray Mitchell =

John Murray Mitchell may refer to:

- J. Murray Mitchell (1928–1990), American climatologist
- John Murray Mitchell (missionary) (1815–1904), missionary and orientalist
- John M. Mitchell (1858–1905), US Representative from New York

== See also ==
- John Mitchell (disambiguation)
