= Local Government Board for Scotland =

Government body

The Local Government Board for Scotland was the body charged with overseeing local government, public health, housing and poor law of Scotland from 1894 to 1919.

== Establishment ==
The board was established by the Local Government (Scotland) Act 1894. The new body took over the powers and duties of the Board of Supervision which had supervised poor law provision since 1845. The board had three ex officio members and three appointed members. The ex officio members were the Secretary for Scotland (who was the president of the board), the Solicitor General for Scotland and the Under-Secretary for Scotland. Of the three appointed members, one was to be the vice-president of the board, the second a member of the Faculty of Advocates of not less than three years' standing, and the third a medical practitioner with a diploma in sanitary science or public health, or who had been the medical officer of a county or burgh for at least five years.

The first members of the board were-

- Sir George Otto Trevelyan, Secretary for Scotland, president.
- Thomas Shaw, Q.C., M.P., Solicitor General for Scotland.
- Sir Colin Campbell Scott Moncrieff, Under Secretary for Scotland.
- John Skelton, C.B., LL.D., vice-president and chairman of the board in the absence of the president.
- James Patten Macdougall, advocate.
- James M'Lintock, Esquire, M.D., late medical officer to the County Council of Lanarkshire.

== Increased powers ==
The Public Health (Scotland) Act 1897 (60 & 61 Vict. c. 38) made the LGBS the "central authority" for public health in Scotland. The board was empowered to carry out inquiries into the sanitary conditions of any district. These inquiries could be initiated by the board's own inspectors or by written application of a parish council or ten ratepayers of a district. The board was given the power to appoint commissioners to carry out inquiries, and legal penalties could be imposed on anybody refusing to respond to a summons issued by the board, or who gave false evidence to an inquiry. Under the Cremation Act 1902 (2 Edw. 7. c. 8) it became compulsory for the board to approve the plans and site for any proposed crematoria.

== Abolition ==
The LGBS was abolished in 1919 and replaced by the Scottish Board of Health.
