= Local Government (Scotland) Act 1894 =

Act of the Parliament of the United Kingdom

Local Government (Scotland) Act 1894 (Note: Section 1.)
- Act of Parliament
- Parliament of the United Kingdom
- Long title: An Act to establish a Local Government Board for Scotland, and make further provision for Local Government in Scotland, and for other purposes.
- Citation: 57 & 58 Vict. c. 58
- Territorial extent: Scotland (Note: Section 2.)

Dates
- Royal assent: 25 August 1894
- Commencement: 25 August 1894 (Note: The Acts of Parliament (Commencement) Act 1793.)
Other legislation
Repeals/revokes	Glasgow Barony Parochial Board Act 1862
Amended by	Local Government (Scotland) Act 1894 Amendment Act 1895; Public Health (Scotland) Act 1897; Town Councils (Scotland) Act 1900; Statute Law Revision Act 1908; Representation of the People Act 1918; Allotments (Scotland) Act 1922; Housing (Scotland) Act 1925; Local Government (Scotland) Act 1929; Local Government (Scotland) Act 1947; National Assistance Act 1948; Statute Law Revision Act 1948; Local Government (Scotland) Act 1973

Status: Partially repealed

Text of statute as originally enacted

Revised text of statute as amended

Text of the Local Government (Scotland) Act 1894 as in force today (including any amendments) within the United Kingdom, from legislation.gov.uk.

The Local Government (Scotland) Act 1894 (57 & 58 Vict. c. 58) is an act of the Parliament of the United Kingdom. It created a Local Government Board for Scotland and replaced existing parochial boards with parish councils.

Part I of the act created the 'Local Government Board for Scotland'. The board had similar powers to those already established in England, Wales, and Ireland. These included the making of orders affecting boundary changes for local authorities and allowing them to carry out such functions as water and gas supply, tramways, and other ancillary activities. The president of the board was the Secretary for Scotland.

Part II of the act established a parish council in every parish, while part III of the act transferred the powers of the abolished parochial boards to the new parish councils.

Finally, part IV of the act gave new powers to landward parishes ("landward" referring to areas outside a burgh), and the landward parts of parishes partly in a burgh to acquire buildings for public offices and layout recreation grounds.

== Bibliography ==
- "The Scotch Local Government Bill". The Times. London. 28 April 1894. p. 9.
- Atkinson, Mabel (March 1903). "The Organization of Local Government in Scotland". Political Science Quarterly. 18 (1). The Academy of Political Science: 59–87. doi:10.2307/2140619. JSTOR 2140619.
- Raw-Fogo, J. A. (June 1899). "Local Finance in Scotland". The Economic Journal. 9 (34). Blackwell Publishing: 184–203. doi:10.2307/2956800. JSTOR 2956800.
- Dunbabin, J. P. D. (October 1977). "British Local Government Reform: The Nineteenth Century and after". The English Historical Review. 92 (365). Oxford University Press: 777–805. doi:10.1093/ehr/xcii.ccclxv.777. JSTOR 567654.
