= Cardiovascular Research =

- Discipline: Cardiology
- Language: English
- Edited by: Tomasz Guzik

Publication details
- History: 1967–present
- Publisher: Oxford University Press
- Frequency: Monthly
- Impact factor: 10.787 (2020)

Standard abbreviations
- ISO 4: Cardiovasc. Res.

Indexing
- CODEN: CVREAU
- ISSN: 1755-3245

Links
- Journal homepage

Cardiovascular Research is a medical journal published monthly by the Oxford University Press on behalf of the European Society of Cardiology. The journal publishes original and review articles from all areas of basic, translational, and clinical cardiovascular disease.

According to the Journal Citation Reports, the impact factor was 10.787 in 2020, ranking the journal 12th out of 138 journals in the 'Cardiac & Cardiovascular systems' category.

The editor-in-chief is Tomasz J. Guzik.

== History ==
The journal was established in 1967 by the British Medical Association on behalf of the British Cardiovascular Society, with John P. Shillingford as the founding editor-in-chief. In 1995, ownership of the journal moved to the European Society of Cardiology and Elsevier became the publisher.

== Editors-in-chief ==
John P. Shillingford 1967-1974

R. J. Linden 1975-1982

Peter Sleight 1983-1991

David J. Hearse 1992-1995

Michiel J. Janse 1995- 2003

Hans Michael Piper 2003-2013

Karin Sipido 2013-2018

Tomasz J. Guzik 2018-
