= Robert MacGregor Mitchell, Lord MacGregor Mitchell =

Scottish lawyer and judge (1875–1938)

The Honourable Lord MacGregor Mitchell

Chairman of the Scottish Land Court
- In office 1934–1938
- Preceded by: Lord St Vigeans
- Succeeded by: Lord Murray

Robert MacGregor Mitchell, Lord MacGregor Mitchell (11 May 1875 – 25 April 1938) was a Scottish lawyer and judge, Liberal Member of Parliament and University Rector.

== Early life ==
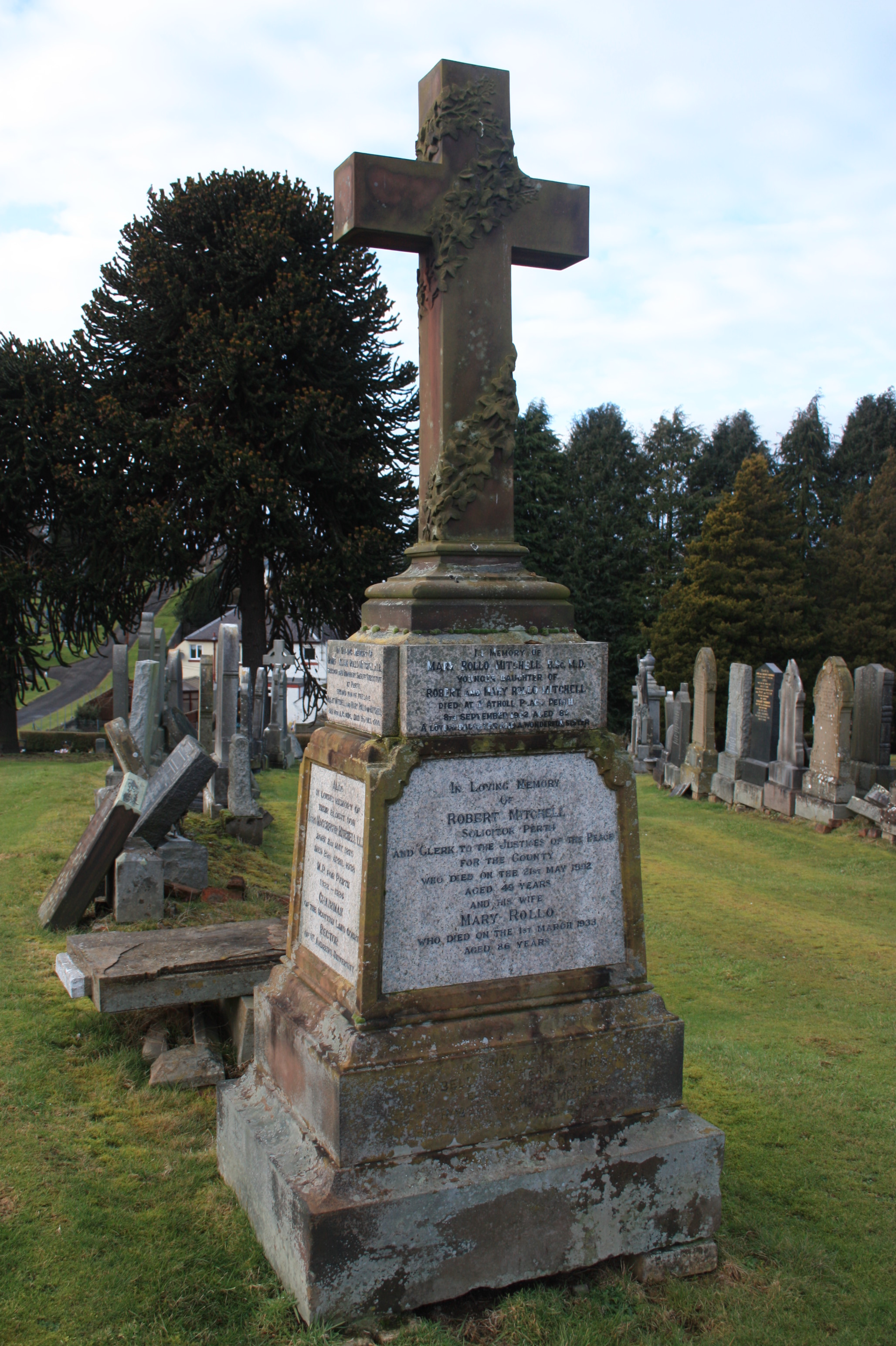
The grave of Lord MacGregor Mitchell, Wellshill Cemetery, Perth

Mitchell was the son of Mary Rollo (1846–1933) and her husband, Robert Mitchell (1842–1892), a solicitor from Perth.

He was educated at Perth Academy. He studied at the University of St Andrews, from which he graduated with an undergraduate Master of Arts (MA) degree in 1895. He then studied law at the University of Edinburgh, graduating in 1895 with a Bachelor of Laws (LLB) degree.

== Career ==
He practised as a solicitor in Perth for some years and was called to the Scottish Bar in 1914. He became a King's Counsel in 1924.

He was elected Liberal MP for Perth at the 1923 general election in a straight fight against the Conservative incumbent Noel Skelton but lost it back in 1924. He did not stand for Parliament again.

In October 1934, he was appointed as Chairman of the Scottish Land Court, succeeding Lord St Vigeans, who had resigned. He took the judicial title Lord Macgregor Mitchell, and held the post until his death in 1938.

He is buried with his parents near the summit of Wellshill Cemetery in north Perth.

== Sources ==
Parliament of the United Kingdom
Preceded by Noel Skelton	Member for Perth; 1923–1924	Succeeded by Noel Skelton
Academic offices
Preceded by Guglielmo Marconi	Rector of the University of St Andrews; 1937–1938	Succeeded by Sir David Munro
