= J. C. McGrath =

Scots Pharmacologist & Regius Prof of Physiology

- Education: University of Glasgow
- Occupations: Physiologist, pharmacologist
- Employer: University of Glasgow (1991–2012)

John Christie McGrath, FRSB, HonFBPhS (born 8 March 1949) is a British retired pharmacologist, physiologist, and academic. Having studied at the University of Glasgow, he remained at the university to teach for the entirety of his career, becoming a lecturer in 1975. On 13 February 1991, he was appointed Regius Professor of Physiology. He retired in 2012, and was made emeritus professor. He was editor-in-chief of the British Journal of Pharmacology from 2009 to 2015.

In 2011, he was awarded the JR Vane Medal by the British Pharmacological Society. He gave the associated lecture on the localisation of vascular α1-adrenoceptors in native tissues, an area of research he undertook from 1990 to 2010.

== Selected works ==
- McGrath, J. C. (October 1978). "Adrenergic and 'non‐adrenergic' components in the contractile response of the vas deferens to a single indirect stimulus". The Journal of Physiology. 283 (1): 23–39. doi:10.1113/jphysiol.1978.sp012486.
- McGrath, J.C. (February 1982). "Evidence for more than one type of post-junctional α-Adrenoceptor". Biochemical Pharmacology. 31 (4): 467–484. doi:10.1016/0006-2952(82)90147-2.
- McGrath, J.C.; Drummond, G.B.; McLachlan, E.M.; Kilkenny, C; Wainwright, C.L. (August 2010). "Guidelines for reporting experiments involving animals: the ARRIVE guidelines". British Journal of Pharmacology. 160 (7): 1573–1576. doi:10.1111/j.1476-5381.2010.00873.x.
- McGrath, John C.; Lilley, Elliot (July 2015). "Implementing guidelines on reporting research using animals ( ARRIVE etc.): new requirements for publication in BJP". British Journal of Pharmacology. 172 (13): 3189–3193. doi:10.1111/bph.12955.
- Southan, Christopher; Sharman, Joanna L.; Benson, Helen E.; Faccenda, Elena; Pawson, Adam J.; Alexander, Stephen P. H.; Buneman, O. Peter; Davenport, Anthony P.; McGrath, John C.; Peters, John A.; Spedding, Michael; Catterall, William A.; Fabbro, Doriano; Davies, Jamie A.; NC-IUPHAR (4 January 2016). "The IUPHAR/BPS Guide to PHARMACOLOGY in 2016: towards curated quantitative interactions between 1300 protein targets and 6000 ligands". Nucleic Acids Research. 44 (D1): D1054–D1068. doi:10.1093/nar/gkv1037. PMC 4702778.
