= Peterhead Power Station =

Gas-fired power station in Aberdeenshire, Scotland

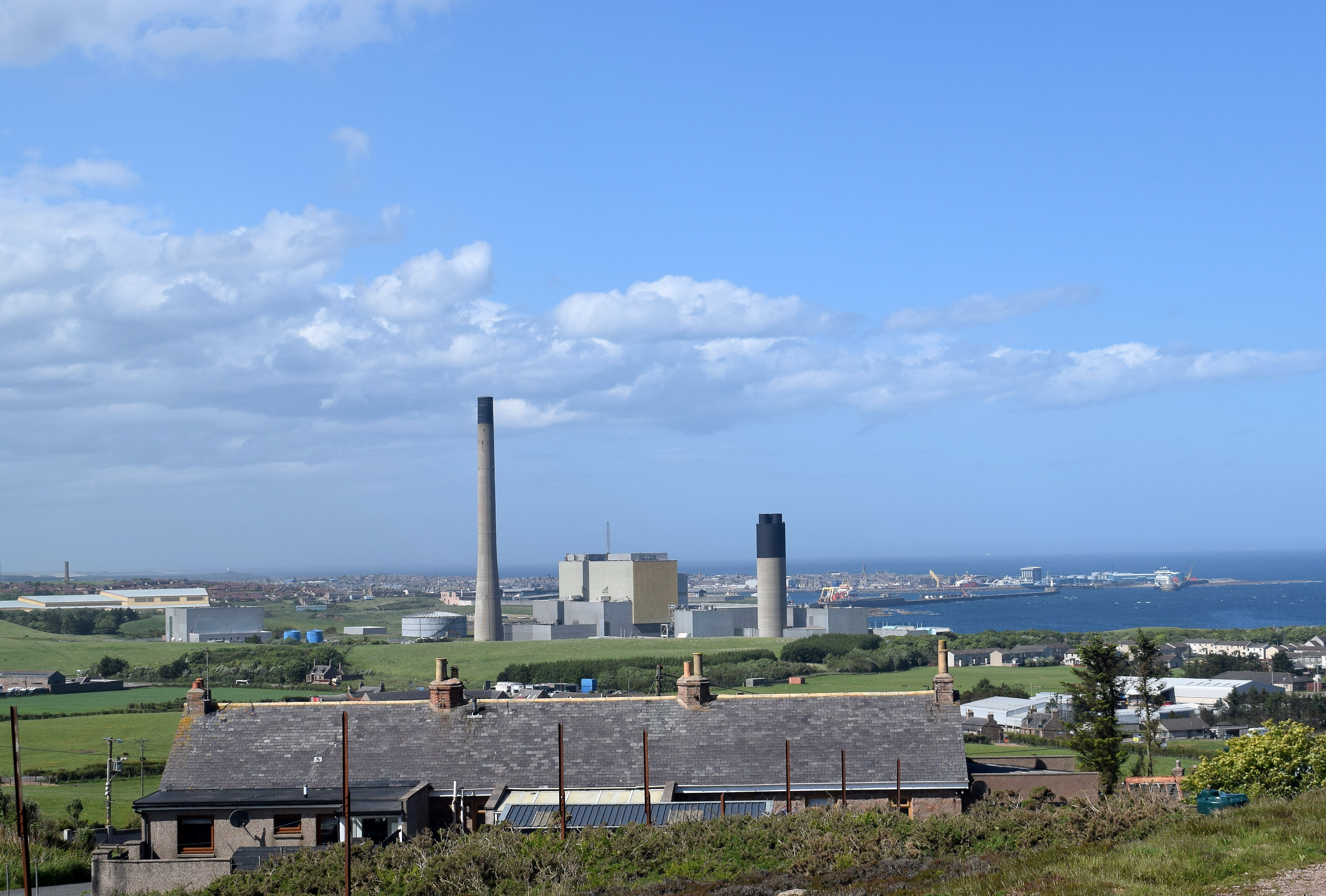
- Viewed from Stirling Hill, looking north towards Peterhead Bay
- Country: Scotland
- Location: Aberdeenshire
- Coordinates: 57.477213°N 1.788879°W
- Construction began: 1973
- Commission date: 1980
- Operator: SSE plc

Thermal power station
- Primary fuel: Natural gas-fired (originally Oil-fired)
- Combined cycle?: Yes

Power generation
- Nameplate capacity: 2,177 MW

External links
- Website: www.ssethermal.com/flexible-generation/operational/peterhead/

Peterhead Power Station is a multi-unit station owned and operated by SSE plc, with a capacity of 2,177 MW (1,550 MW transmissible). It is located near Boddam and the A90, just south of Peterhead, in Aberdeenshire, in the northeast of Scotland. It stands next to Sandford Lodge, a circa-1800-built structure. Initially operating as an oil-fired power station and later transitioning to fossil gas, the plant has also served as a site for experimental hydrogen generation capacity.

In 2007, the site became embroiled in a controversy surrounding a failed hydrogen and carbon capture and storage scheme with BP, which ultimately proved unsuccessful. However, in 2022, the company proposed a new carbon capture and storage plan for the site.

== History ==
=== Oil-fired power station ===
The station was originally planned as a 1320 MWe oil-fired power station consisting of two 676 MWe generating units. Designed by Robert Matthew Johnson Marshall & Partners, construction began in May 1973, completed in 1978, with one unit opening in 1980, and the other in 1982. The original owner was the North of Scotland Hydro-Electric Board. The proximity of the station to St Fergus gas terminal meant, however, that the boilers were converted to burn gas as well as oil. When it opened, it burnt waste gas from the Brent oilfield, before this gas was refined at the Mossmorran refinery near Cowdenbeath, and the price of oil was uneconomic to use. By 1984, the price of oil made it economic to burn.

One fatality occurred on 19 June 1982. A machinist was crushed during the failed lift of a large surface grinder. 41 year old Joseph Smith, worked in the machine shop of the oil-fired power station for his full working life.

=== Gas turbines ===
In the early 1990s the owners (Scottish Hydro Electric) entered into a contract with BP to burn sour gas from the Miller Field. In order to satisfy the terms of this contract two further units were built (two 120 MW Open Cycle gas turbine) with a primary function to burn Miller gas when the two main units were unavailable.

These gas turbines have now been decommissioned and the plant sold to a firm in Africa, where they will be used in a de-salination plant.

Gas was brought into a new gas reception facility called the "PGRF". Due to the nature of the gas all carbon steel piping had to comply with NACE Specification MR 01 75 (90) which required limits on sulphur and carbon content.

The gas supply line from the PGRF was installed by Motherwell Bridge Projects from 1990 to 1991. The piping system consisted of carbon steel piping ranging from 30" to 20" fully welded and tested producing a high integrity system. The system feeds both units terminating on the air preheater roof where the main boiler feeds are controlled through a gas header. The header consists of three 14" and one 10" valve.

=== Combined cycle gas turbines ===
In 2000 the station completed a major repowering project to increase the efficiency and capacity of the station. Three gas turbines were utilised in an innovative manner to provide steam to one of the original steam turbines. These changes allowed for 1150 MWe of output to be delivered at 57% thermal efficiency compared with the plant's original 37%.

It was officially opened by Prince Charles on Tuesday 17 October 2000.

The installed capacity of Peterhead increased to 2407 MWe in November 2007 following a compressor and combustion control upgrade on GT11, 12 and 13 making it the largest power station in Scotland ahead of Longannet. The transmission system at Peterhead however, limits production to 1550 MWe.

In May 2009 GT3 and GT4 were decommissioned. The installed capacity of Peterhead is now reduced to 2177 MW.

The power station was refurbished during 2015, and returned to service in November 2015. The station is now configured for flexibly and efficiently generating between 240 MWe and 400 MWe, with a Supplemental Balancing Reserve (SBR) contract for an additional 750 MWe to provide occasional back-up over the winter period.

The station has secured contracts up to 2021/22 and is scheduled to produce 1.05GWh in 2019/20 and 1.06GWh in 2020/21.

=== Hydrogen power plant ===
In 2006 there were plans to produce 350 MWe of power from hydrogen produced from methane, with the resulting carbon dioxide being pumped into the Miller Field by BP using carbon capture. It would have been the first large scale hydrogen power plant. On 23 May 2007, BP pulled the plug on the carbon capture idea after losing patience waiting for UK government approval, with concern over the long term storage capacity of the Miller Field.

== Specification ==
The three 277 MWe V94.3A (now called SGT5-4000F) Siemens gas turbines provide a CCGT-type system of power generation, with three Doosan Babcock heat recovery steam generators providing steam to one (older) steam turbine.
