= Sandford Lodge =

Building in Scotland

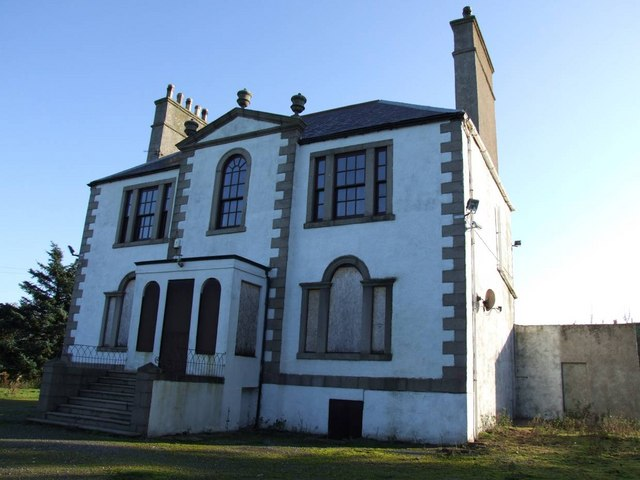
- Sandford Lodge in 2008
- Interactive map of the Sandford Lodge area

General information
- Architectural style: Georgian
- Location: Peterhead, Scotland
- Coordinates: 57.480681°N 1.794863°W
- Completed: c. 1800

Technical details
- Floor count: 3 (including basement)

Sandford Lodge is a Category B listed building in Peterhead, Aberdeenshire, Scotland. A former farmhouse, described by Charles McKean as a "miniature mansion house", it was built around 1800; today, only the shell of the building remains, after a fire in the early hours of 8 August 2015.

James Skelton (1799–1882), sheriff substitute of Peterhead and possibly the original owner, was resident at the lodge in 1856. His wife was Margaret Marjory (née Kinnear) (1805–1878). Their only daughter, Janet Georgina (1832–1860), wed James Mitchell, minister of Peterhead's Deer Church, at the lodge on 7 September 1859, but she died the following year, aged 27. Their son was Sir John Skelton.

William Aiton lived there in 1873. He was one of the original contractors for the construction of the Suez Canal, and was also contracted for the Maybole and Girvan Railway. In April and May 1865 he worked with Thomas Inglis of Glasgow on a survey of the Great Pyramid of Giza. He died in February 1893, being "upwards of 70 years of age".

In the early 19th century, the lodge was the home of Private Robert Willox, of the Gordon Highlanders. He died as a prisoner of war in the Second World War on 7 June 1943, aged 25, after suffering from beriberi, and was buried in Kanchanaburi War Cemetery in Kanchanaburi, Thailand. He lived at the lodge with his parents, James and Margaret, of whom he was one of ten children. His parents are buried in Longside Cemetery, Longside, near Peterhead.

G. Anderson lived at the lodge in the late 19th century.

James Sutherland (1851–1933) later ran his "great transport business in Peterhead" from the property. The business was a bus operator. "During his tenancy of the Sandford farm he had a grieve called Sandy Christie, and the foreman's name was Fordyce," wrote David Toulmin.

Peterhead Power Station was built adjacent to the property in 1978.

== Gallery ==
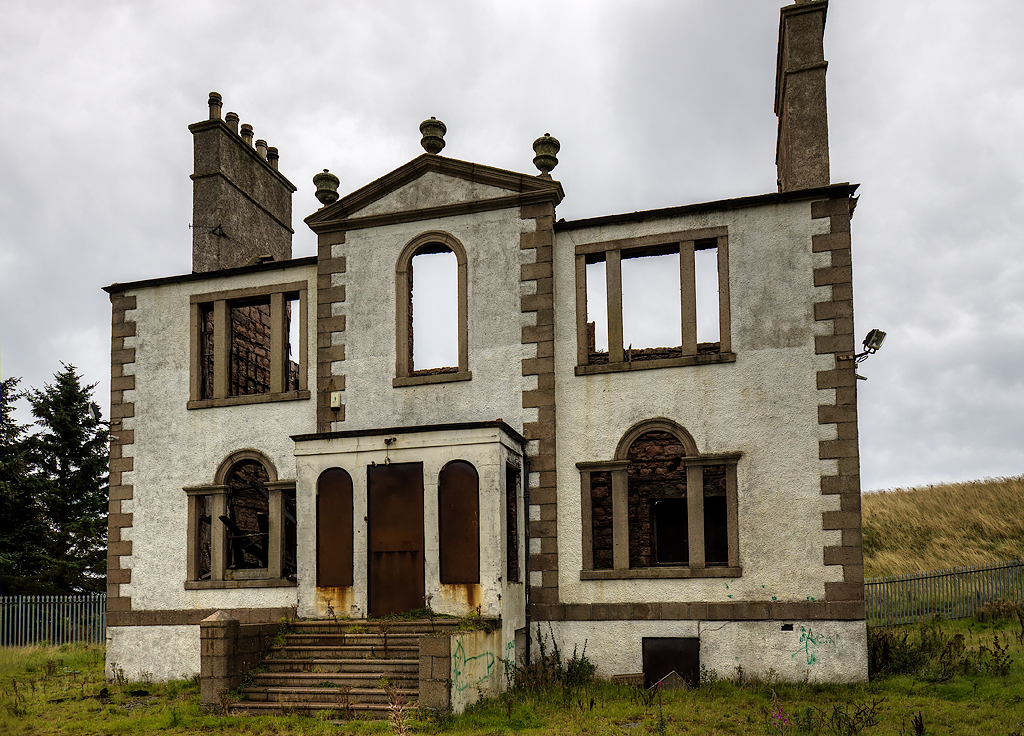
Pictured in 2018, three years after the fire that gutted the building

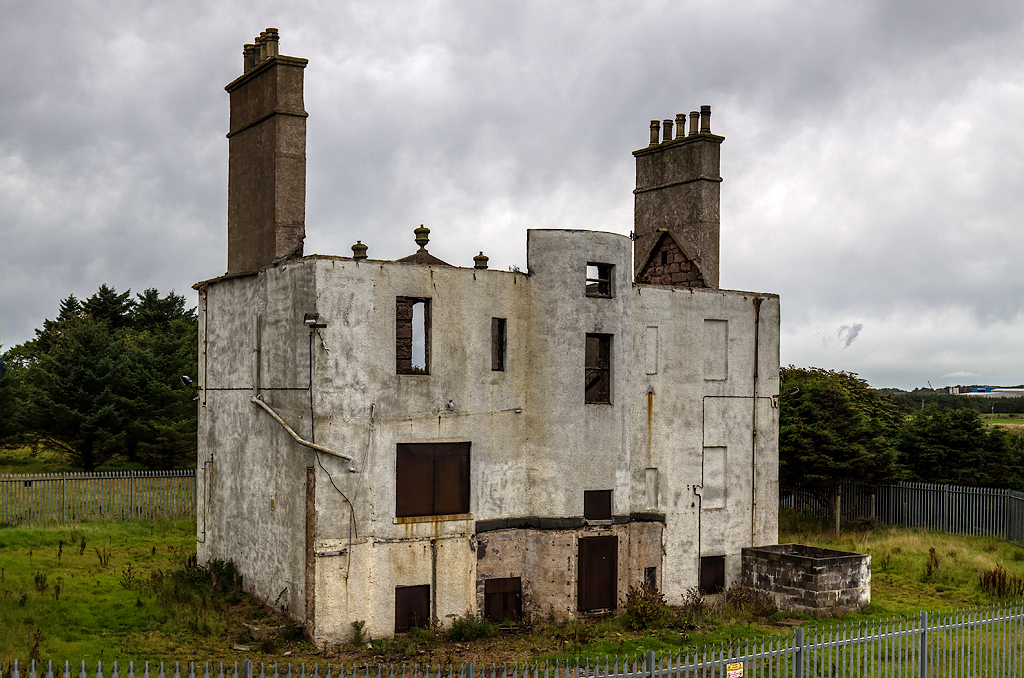
The rear of the property

== See also ==
- List of listed buildings in Peterhead, Aberdeenshire
