= Noel Skelton =

British politician (1880–1935)

- Skelton, c. 1924

Member of Parliament for Combined Scottish Universities
- In office 1931–1935
- Preceded by: Sir George Berry
- Succeeded by: Ramsay MacDonald

Member of Parliament for Perth
- In office 1924–1931
- Preceded by: Robert MacGregor Mitchell
- Succeeded by: Lord Scone

Personal details
- Born: 1 July 1880 Hermitage of Braid, Edinburgh
- Died: 22 November 1935 (aged 55) Edinburgh, Scotland
- Party: Unionist Party
- Parent(s): Sir John Skelton; Anne Adair
- Education: Glenalmond College
- Alma mater: University of Edinburgh; Christ Church, Oxford

Military service
- Allegiance: United Kingdom
- Branch/service: British Army
- Rank: Major
- Unit: Scottish Horse
- Battles/wars: World War I: Gallipoli Campaign; Macedonian front; Western Front

Archibald Noel Skelton (1 July 1880 – 22 November 1935) was a Scottish Unionist politician, journalist and intellectual.

== Early life ==
The son of Sir John Skelton KCB LLD, Skelton was born on 1 July 1880 at Hermitage of Braid in Edinburgh and was educated at Glenalmond College, the University of Edinburgh and at Christ Church, Oxford, to which he won a history scholarship. He was placed in the Second Class in the School of Modern History in 1902, and in 1906 he was called to the Scottish Bar and therefore joined the Faculty of Advocates. Skelton was respected as a lawyer, but he dealt mainly with divorce cases and those involving disputed wills. In 1920, he was appointed Junior Counsel to the Post Office and to the Board of Inland Revenue in 1921. In the First World War, he served with the Scottish Horse as a Lieutenant, Captain and latterly a Major in Gallipoli, Salonika and France, where he was seriously wounded in the last weeks of the war.

== Political career ==
Skelton first stood for Parliament at the second general election of 1910, but he lost the East Perthshire Division to his Liberal opponent. Despite his defeat, Skelton remained active in politics, speaking frequently from Unionist platforms across Scotland. He was opposed to Irish Home Rule, but he was more progressive on issues like land reform, industrial relations and the use of the referendum. At the end of the Great War, Skelton stood aside and allowed the Coalition candidate in East Perthshire to be elected unopposed. However, he was elected Member of Parliament for the new Perth Division in 1922, although he lost the constituency a year later to a Liberal.

== Constructive conservatism ==
Skelton was a talented journalist and wrote frequently for The Spectator, including four articles in 1923 under the heading "Constructive Conservatism". These lively articles set out his political philosophy—chiefly, the pursuit of a property-owning democracy; the division of land into small-holdings; co-partnership and share options to improve industrial relations; and finally the use of referendums to resolve disputes between the House of Commons and House of Lords—as well as urging the Unionists to compete with Labour on more typically socialist issues like pensions and housing. The four Spectator articles were republished in 1924 as a pamphlet, which had a lasting influence, particularly among younger Tory MPs. Ben Jackson, a historian at the University of Oxford, suggests that Skelton's views may have been influenced by Hilaire Belloc, particularly the views expounded in The Servile State.

== YMCA ==
Skelton was re-elected for Perth in 1924 and again in 1929. He quickly struck up friendships with English Conservative MPs such as Anthony Eden, Harold Macmillan, Robert Boothby, John Buchan and Oliver Stanley, and became the intellectual leader of a parliamentary grouping that was dubbed "the YMCA" by cynical older MPs. The group lobbied to make sure that Prime Minister Stanley Baldwin resisted the influence of reactionary elements in the Conservative Party and instead implemented progressive legislation. Baldwin was sympathetic, and it was soundings with the YMCA that prevented Baldwin backing a controversial Political Levy Bill that would have had disastrous consequences for industrial relations in the United Kingdom. Skelton also wrote several articles for The Spectator, the Quarterly Review and the English Review.

== Scottish Office ==
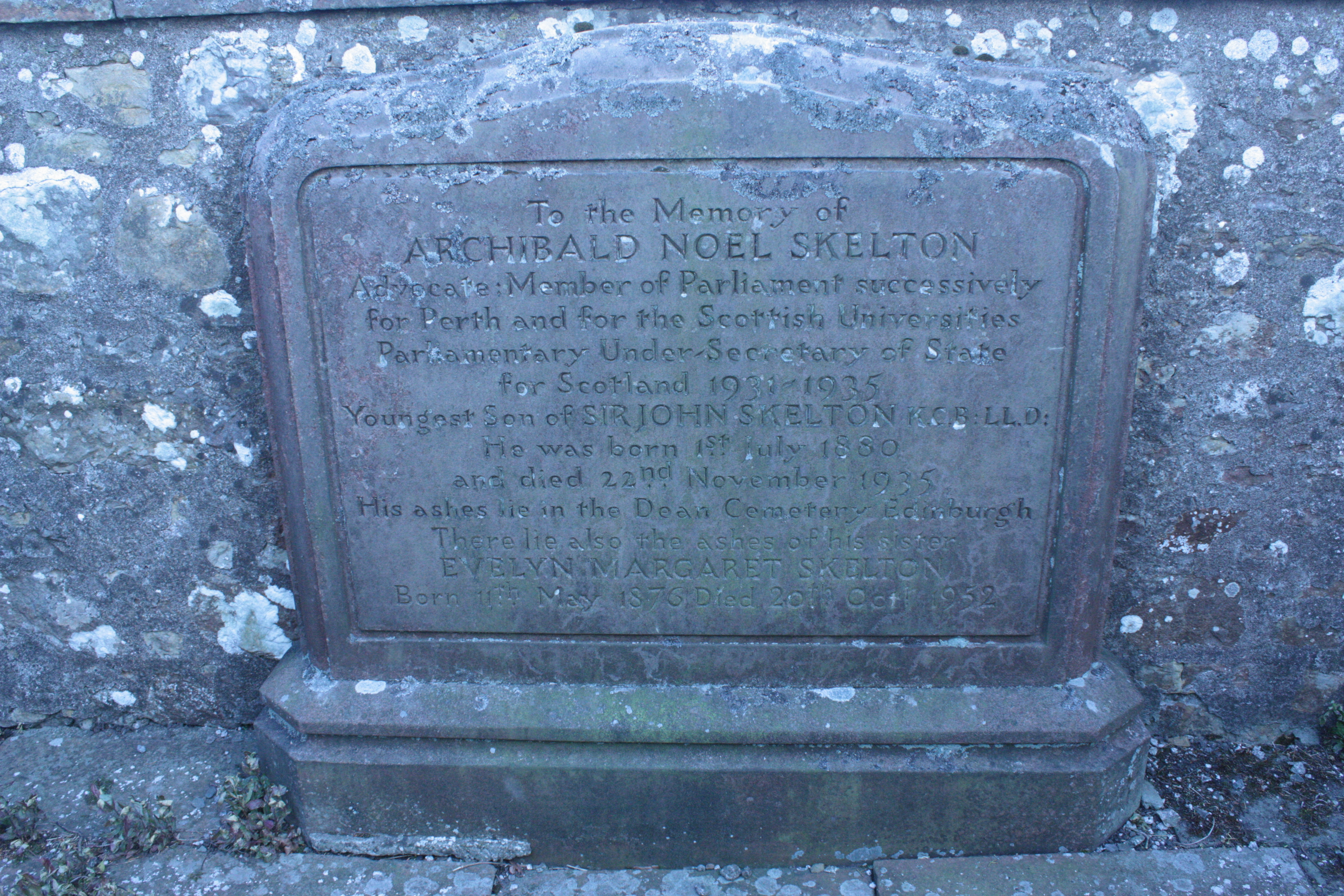
Memorial to Archibald Noel Skelton, old churchyard, Loch Leven, Kinross

Skelton switched to the Scottish Universities constituency in 1931 and was returned unopposed. That same year he was appointed Parliamentary Under-Secretary of State for Scotland with responsibility for health, housing and education.

By 1935 Skelton was terminally ill with cancer and after several weeks in a nursing home he died in Edinburgh, aged 55, on 22 November 1935. The declaration for the Scottish Universities constituency was made three days later and Skelton was re-elected posthumously.

Skelton was cremated and his ashes were buried in Dean Cemetery with those of his sister. A separate memorial lies in the old churchyard in Kinross on the edge of Loch Leven.

== Influence ==
Once viewed as a prospective Conservative leader and a prominent Cabinet minister, Skelton's influence, though fleeting in the public eye, was acknowledged by Harold Macmillan in his memoirs. Macmillan noted that Skelton's impact on politics and political thought grew steadily over the years. Skelton's ideas on property ownership as a cornerstone of modern conservatism gained significant traction, with Anthony Eden later revitalizing Skelton's concept of "a property-owning democracy" at the Conservative Party conference in 1946. This slogan was subsequently adopted by Macmillan to underpin the extensive house-building initiatives of the 1950s.

Macmillan's successor as Prime Minister, Alec Douglas-Home, owed his early political career to Skelton, having been his PPS from 1931 to 1935.

Parliament of the United Kingdom
Preceded by William Young	Member of Parliament for Perth; 1922–1923	Succeeded by Robert MacGregor Mitchell
Preceded by Robert MacGregor Mitchell	Member of Parliament for Perth; 1924–1931	Succeeded by Mungo Murray
Preceded by George Berry and Dugald Cowan and John Buchan	Member of Parliament for Combined Scottish Universities; 1931–1936; With: John Buchan, 1927–1935; Dugald Cowan, to 1924; George Morrison, from 1934; John Graham Kerr, from 1935	Succeeded by Ramsay MacDonald and George Morrison and John Graham Kerr
