= Tomasz Guzik =

Polish physician scientist

Tomasz Jan Guzik (born 8 March 1974 in Kraków, Poland) is a Polish physician scientist. Since 2012, he has been the Regius Professor of Physiology at the University of Glasgow.

He is a member of the American Heart Association and scientific societies of Poland, United Kingdom and the United States of America.

== Early life and education ==
Guzik graduated in Medicine from Jagiellonian University School of Medicine in Kraków, He continued his education in Oxford receiving a degree in molecular medicine from the University of Oxford where he studied under the guidance of Prof Keith M Channon. He received PhD degree in 2000 under the guidance of Prof Juliusz Pryjma and in 2004 became an assistant professor at Jagiellonian University.

== Academic career ==
His scientific work concerns vascular biology and pharmacology of endothelium. His research focuses on the mechanisms of oxidative stress in human vasculature and on the search for novel antioxidants which could be clinically more useful than vitamins currently available. Working at the Wellcome Trust in Oxford, he found the possible relationships between genetic variation of human genome and free radical production and oxidative stress. He described selected mechanisms of oxidative stress in human diabetes mellitus.

Notable recognition that Guzik has received include the honorary Bernard and Joan Marshall Prize in Research Excellence from the British Society for Cardiovascular Research and the Corcoran Memorial Prize and Lecture from the American Heart Association in 2017.

Guzik is the current Editor-in-Chief of Cardiovascular Research, a high-impact academic journal produced by the European Society of Cardiology.

== Honours ==
Guzik has received awards from the Polish Government, Crescendum Est Polonia Foundation, Wellcome Trust and others. In 2010, he was awarded the Prize of the Foundation for Polish Science. He was elected a Fellow of the Royal Society of Edinburgh in 2024.
