= Edward Provan Cathcart =

Scottish physiologist

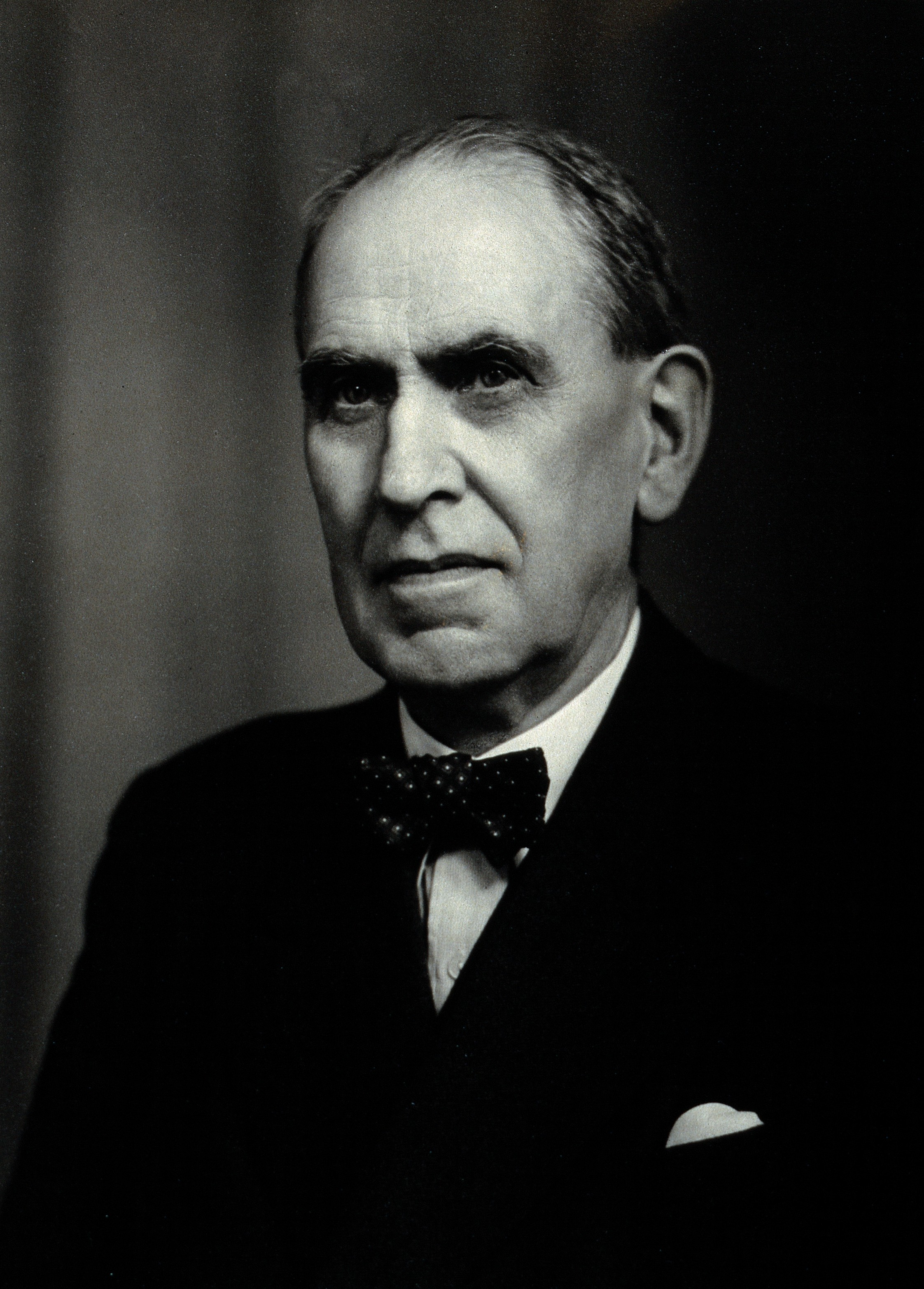
Edward Provan Cathcart

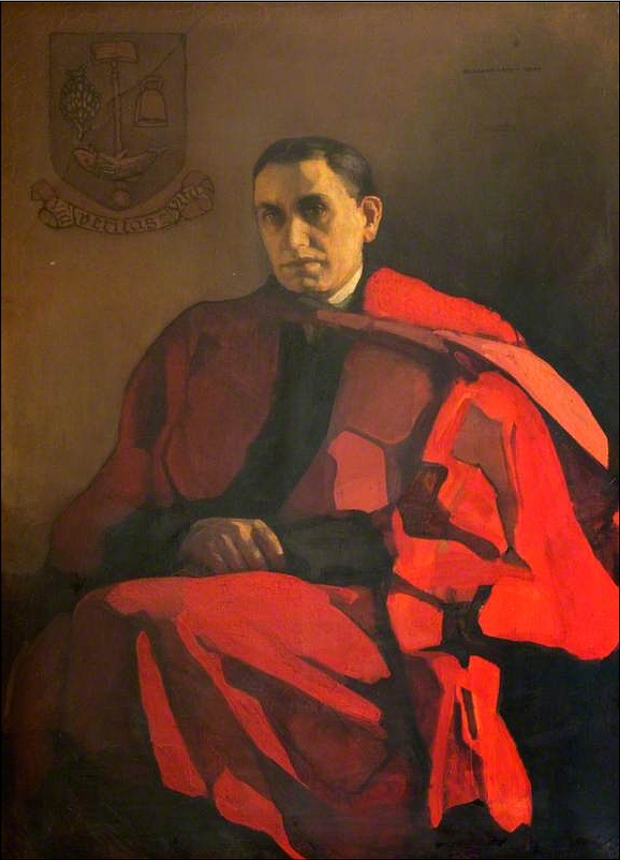
Norah Neilson Gray - Edward Provan Cathcart c. 1930

Edward Provan Cathcart CBE FRS FRSE (18 July 1877 – 18 February 1954) was a Scottish physician and physiologist of international fame. The Cathcart Chair in Biochemistry at the University of Glasgow is named after him. Together with John Boyd Orr he published influential papers on protein metabolism in humans. He is also remembered as Chairman of the Scottish Health Board Committee 1933-1936. The Cathcart Committee (named after him) was critical to the Scottish input to the foundation of the National Health Service after World War II. His obituary described his as a "life well spent in the service of mankind".

== Life ==
He was born in Ayr on 18 July 1877, the son of Margaret Miller, from a family of rivet and bolt manufacturers, and Edward Moore Cathcart, a merchant in the town. His father died when Cathcart was only nine, leaving his mother to raise him and his younger brother and sister. He was educated at Ayr Academy, then attended the University of Glasgow, graduating in 1900. He then travelled to Germany, both Munich and Berlin, to complete further studies in bacteriology and chemical pathology. At this time he was heavily influenced by the work of Carl von Voit. From 1902 to 1905 he worked at the Lister Institute of Preventive Medicine in London.

From 1905 to 1915 he served as the Grieve Lecturer in Physiological Chemistry at the University of Glasgow. During World War I he served with the Royal Army Medical Corps. He was then attached to the Anti-Gas Services section, rising to be Depute Director of that service. In 1917 he was transferred to the same role in relation to the Home Services. He rose to the level of Lt Col Director on the General Staff (Army Medical Services).

After the war he returned to the University of Glasgow as Professor of Physiological Chemistry. He served as Regius Professor of Physiology at the University from 1928 until his retiral in 1947.

He was elected a Fellow of the Royal Society in 1920 and a Fellow of the Royal Society of Edinburgh in 1932. The University of St Andrews awarded him an honorary doctorate (LLD) in 1928 and the University of Glasgow the same in 1947.

He was appointed a Commander of the Order of the British Empire (CBE) in the 1924 Birthday Honours.

He died at home, 80 Oakfield Avenue in Glasgow, on 18 February 1954.

== Publications ==
- Nutrition (1911)
- Physiology of Protein Metabolism (1912)
- The Energy Expenditure of the Infantry Recruit in Training (1919)
- Physique of Women in Industry (1927)
- The Human Factor in Industry (1928)
- Practical Physiology (1929)
- Physique of Man in Industry (1935)

== Positions of note ==
- Chairman of the Industrial Health Research Board
- Member of the Medical Research Council
- Member of the advisory board on nutrition to the Ministry of Health
- Member of the Committee on Colonial Nutrition
- Several committees linked to the League of Nations work on nutrition
- Member of the Agricultural Research Council
- Interim Director of the Hannah Dairy Research Unit
- Chairman of the Scottish Health Services Committee
- Representee for the University of Glasgow on the General Medical Council
- Member of the War Cabinet Scientific Committee on Food Policy
- Member of the Army Hygiene Advisory Committee
- Member of the National Advisory Committee on Physical Training
- Vice President of the Royal Society of Edinburgh 1948-51

== Family ==
In 1913 he married Gertrude Dorman Bostock, a fellow physiology student, and only the third female science graduate in the history of the University of Glasgow.

== Recognition ==
Cathcart was painted by Norah Neilson Gray in 1930.
