= John Skelton (author) =

Scottish lawyer, author and administrator

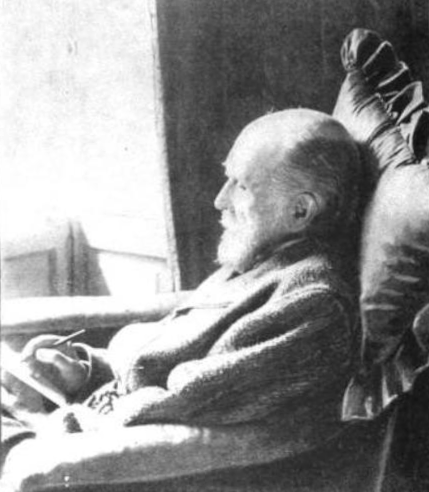
- Born: 18 July 1831; Edinburgh, Scotland
- Died: 19 July 1897 (aged 66); Hermitage of Braid, Scotland
- Occupations: Lawyer, author, administrator
- Spouse: Anne Adair (m. 1867)
- Children: Several, including Noel Skelton

Sir John Skelton KCB (18 July 1831 – 19 July 1897) was a Scottish lawyer, author and administrator. He is best known for his contributions to The Guardian and Blackwood's Magazine.

== Life ==
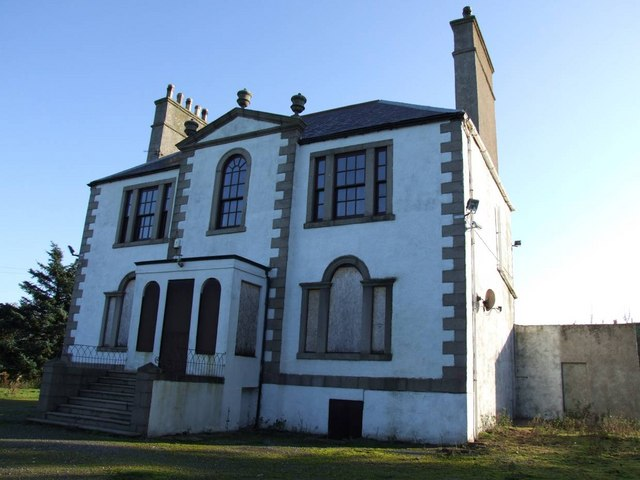
Skelton's father, James, owned Sandford Lodge in Peterhead

Born in Edinburgh, he was the son of James Skelton of Sandford Newton, writer to the signet, sheriff-substitute at Peterhead and original owner of Sandford Lodge, where he was brought up. His mother was Margaret Marjory Kinnear and his sister was Janet Georgina. He was educated at the University of Edinburgh. In 1854 he was admitted a member of the Faculty of Advocates; but concentrated on writing.

When the Scottish Board of Supervision, which administered the laws on the poor and public health, was reconstituted in 1868, Skelton was appointed secretary by Benjamin Disraeli. He retained the post of secretary to the board of supervision till 1892, when he was elected chairman. In 1894, when the board was replaced by the Local Government Board for Scotland, Skelton became vice-president of the new body. He finally retired on 31 March 1897.

In 1878 Skelton received the honorary degree of LL.D. from Edinburgh University; he was created C.B. in the 1887 Golden Jubilee Honours, and K.C.B. in the 1897 Diamond Jubilee Honours although, as he died shortly thereafter, he was never invested with the insignia of the Order, and a Royal Warrant was subsequently issued granting his widow the appropriate style, title and precedence.

He died on 19 July 1897 at Hermitage of Braid, in south Edinburgh. He is buried on the obscured lower southern terrace of Dean Cemetery in western Edinburgh with his wife, Dame Anne Adair Lawrie (1847-1925), and son Archibald Noel Skelton (1880-1935) and daughter Evelyn Margaret Skelton (1876-1952).

Joseph Noel Paton was one of his friends, as was Thomas Spencer Baynes from student days. Paton is buried very close to Skelton's grave.

== Works ==
In 1857 Skelton contributed to a volume of Edinburgh Essays an essay on "Early English Life in the Drama". He used the pseudonym of "Shirley" from the novel by Charlotte Brontë, and became a regular contributor of essays and reviews to the Guardian, a short-lived Edinburgh periodical, and to Fraser's Magazine; he was on good terms with James Anthony Froude, its editor. In 1862 appeared Nugæ Criticæ, a collection of his published essays, and Thalatta, or the Great Commoner, a political novel based on a character with characteristics of George Canning and Disraeli. Benjamin Disraeli: the Past and the Future (London, 1868) was a sympathetic sketch.

Skelton annotated the Public Health Act 1867. In 1876 he published another official work of authority, The Boarding-out of Pauper Children in Scotland (Edinburgh). ‘The Handbook of Public Health’ (London, 1890, 8vo; supplement, 1891) and ‘The Local Government (Scotland) Act in relation to Public Health’ (Edinburgh and London, 1890, 8vo; 2nd edit. 1890) were further contributions to official literature. He also edited, with his friend the judge William Ellis Gloag the second edition of William Gillespie Dickson's Treatise on the Law of Evidence in Scotland, 1864.

In 1869 Skelton started writing for Blackwood's Magazine, which he did for the rest of his life. In 1876 he published The Impeachment of Mary Stuart (Edinburgh), on the side of Mary, Queen of Scots. This was followed in 1883 by Essays in Romance and Studies from Life; in 1887–8 by Maitland of Lethington and the Scotland of Mary Stuart (Edinburgh); and in 1893 by Mary Stuart (London), all advocacy for the queen.

Other works were:

- John Dryden, "In Defence", London, 1865.
- A Campaigner at Home, 1865.
- The Great Lord Bolingbroke, Henry St. John, Edinburgh, 1868.
- A selection from Christopher North's Noctes Ambrosianæ, 1876.
- Essays of Shirley (Edinburgh, 1882).
- The Table Talk of Shirley (Edinburgh, 1895), second series in 1896 as Summers and Winters at Balmawhapple,’ mainly of reminiscences, of Froude, Gabriel Dante Rossetti, and other personal friends and literary contemporaries.
- The Crookit Meg: a Story of the Year One, London, 1880. It originally ran as a serial in Fraser's Magazine.
- A volume of poems, Spring Songs by a Western Highlander.
- Introductions to the illustrated Royal House of Stuart, and a similar work on Charles I.

== Family ==
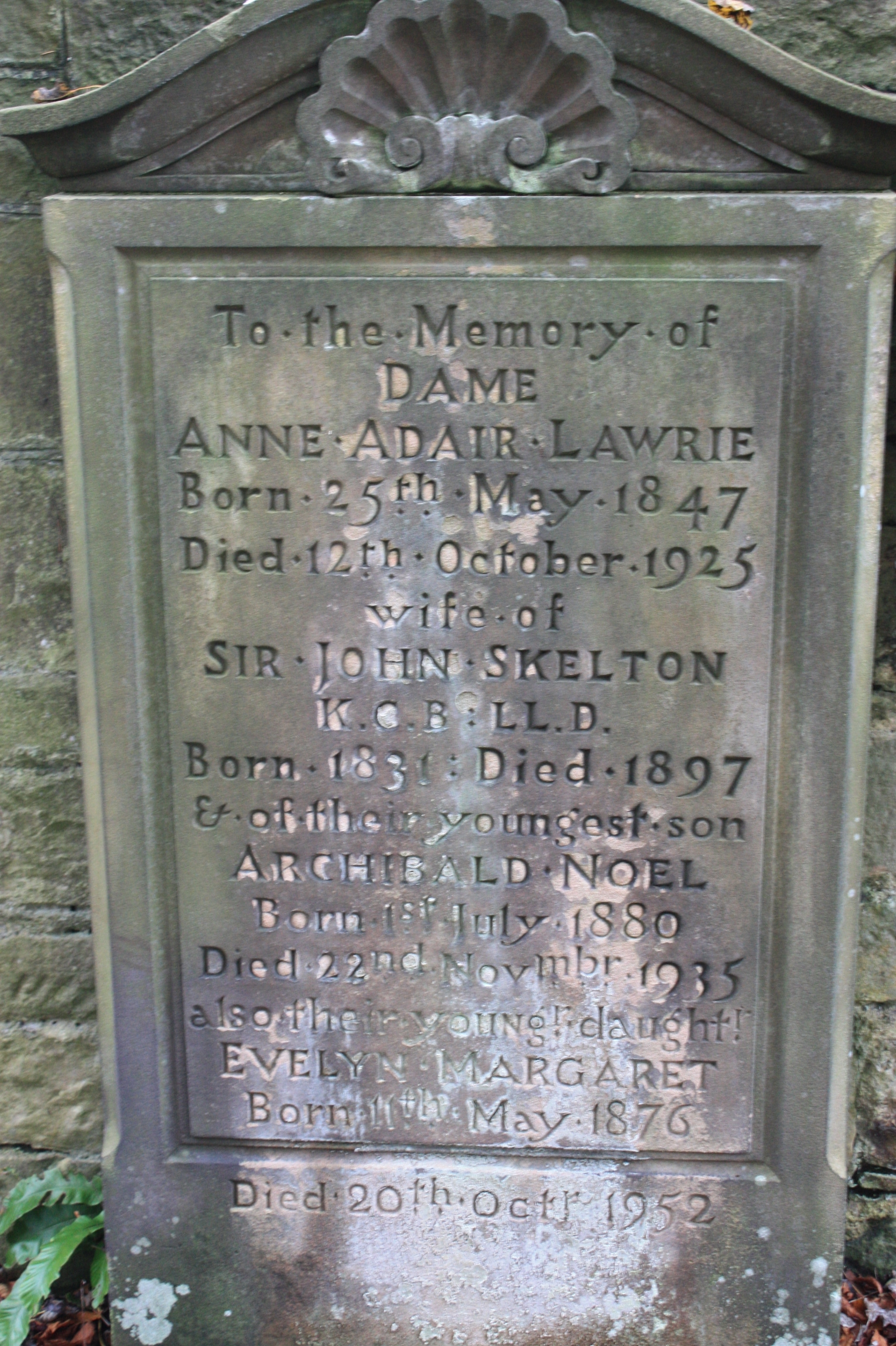
The grave of Anne Adair Lawrie, Dame Skelton, Dean Cemetery

Skelton married, in 1867, Anne Adair (1847-1925), daughter of James Adair Lawrie, professor of surgery at Glasgow. She survived him, with several children including Noel Skelton. She is buried in Dean Cemetery in Edinburgh on the southern terrace.

== Notes ==
Attribution This article incorporates text from a publication now in the public domain: Lee, Sidney, ed. (1897). "Skelton, John (1831-1897)". Dictionary of National Biography. Vol. 52. London: Smith, Elder & Co.
