= John Murray Mitchell (missionary) =

Scottish missionary and orientalist (1815–1904)

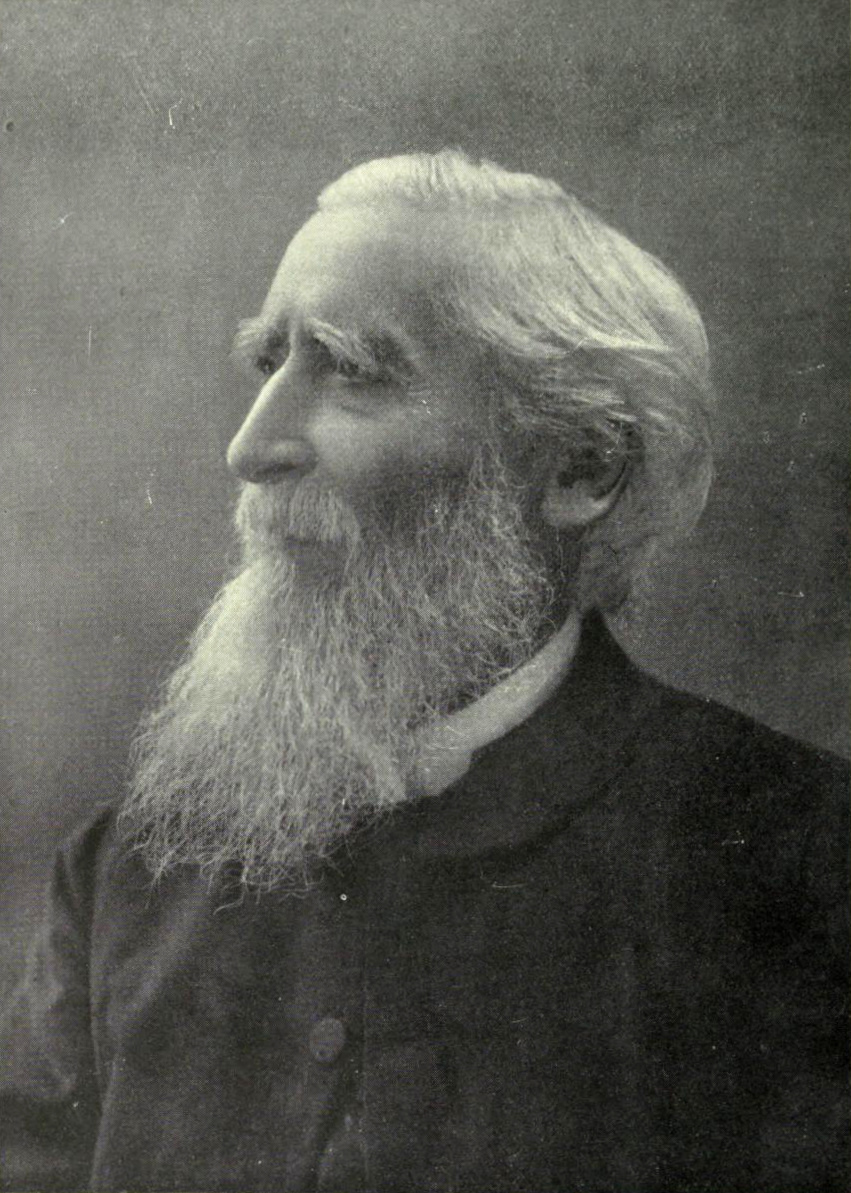
Rev. J. Murray Mitchell

John Murray Mitchell (19 August 1815 – 14 November 1904) was a Scottish missionary and orientalist who worked in his country of birth, India and France.

== Life ==
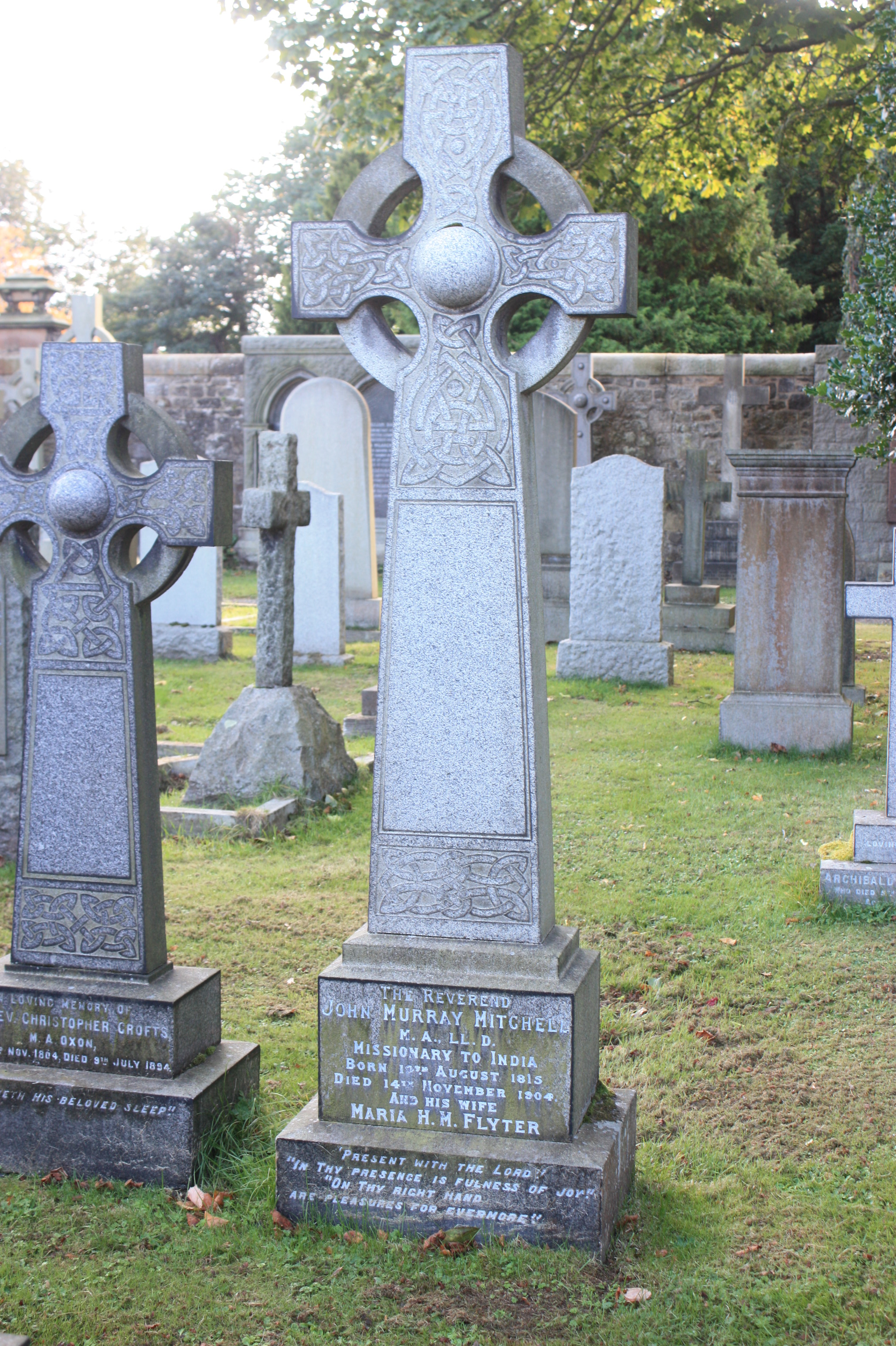
Mitchell's grave in Dean Cemetery

John Murray Mitchell was born in the manse at Garvock near Aberdeen, Scotland, on 19 August 1815. His parents, who had seven other children, were Rev James Mitchell and his wife, Margaret Gordon. Following education in Kinneff, Kincardineshire and a year at Aberdeen Grammar School, he joined the city's Marischal College in 1829. He graduated with an MA in 1833 and then studied for the church ministry, initially in Aberdeen and later in Edinburgh. He was ordained by the Church of Scotland in July 1838.

Mitchell was sent to Bombay, India, to join some missionary colleagues of the Church of Scotland in November 1838. There he was able to continue his interest in languages, for which he had already received prizes during his studies. He soon mastered Marathi and also studied Sanskrit and what was then called Zend.

The schism in the Church of Scotland in 1843 resulted in Mitchell favouring the newly formed Free Church of Scotland. In the following year, he moved to Nagpur with Stephen Hislop in order to establish a new mission. He frequently travelled from that base to speak with local people, often in their own language, but in 1846 he had to return to Scotland due to the poor health of his wife, Maria Hay Mackenzie née Flyter, whom he had married in Bombay on 22 December 1842.

Mitchell returned alone to India before the end of 1846, having addressed the church's general assembly during his time back in his native country. It was three more years before a still-sickly Maria was able to join him in Nagpur and in 1856 she once again retreated to Scotland, with her husband following in January 1857. During the interval, from 1854 to 1856, Mitchell was based in Poona, where he acted as relief for a missionary colleague, James Mitchell.

In 1858, Mitchell was awarded an LL.D degree by Marischal College. A year later, in November 1859, he returned to India and again relieved James Mitchell at Poona. Maria left the country in October 1862 and in April 1863 her husband also left, taking up a ministry at Broughty Ferry, near Dundee in Scotland, until 1867. He began 1868 with another voyage to India, where he took charge of Duff College in Calcutta at a time when the mission in that city was experiencing difficulties. During this period in India, he assisted in founding a mission to work among the Santal people and also had a significant role in establishing the Simla Union Church, which opened in 1870 and catered for a united congregation of European Presbyterians and Dissenters.

After another period in Scotland from 1873, when he served as Secretary of the church's Foreign Mission Committee, he returned to India for the last time in 1880 and remained there for two years. Later, after 1888, he worked on behalf of the church in Nice, France.

In recognition of his being the oldest minister of the Free Church, Mitchell presided over the vote in the adoption of the 1900 Uniting Act, which brought about United Free Church of Scotland, through the union of the Free Church of Scotland with the United Presbyterian Church of Scotland.

Mitchell died at South Leith manse, his brother Very Rev James Mitchell's home in Leith, on 14 November 1904. His brother had served as Moderator of the General Assembly of the Church of Scotland in 1901. John was buried in the city's Dean Cemetery on 18 November. The grave lies in the first northern extension, behind his brother's grave.

== Family ==
He and his wife, Maria H. M. Flyter, who died in 1907, had no children.

== Publications ==
Among Mitchell's writings were:

- Letters to Indian Youth
- Memoir (1858), of his missionary colleague Robert Nesbit, whom he had joined in Bombay at the outset of his career
- Hinduism, Past and Present (1885)
- In Western India (1899), a partial autobiography
- The Great Religions of India (1905), published posthumously and based on his Duff Lectures of 1903

Mitchell also translated works from Marathi into English.
