= Otto Hutter =

British physiologist (1924–2020)

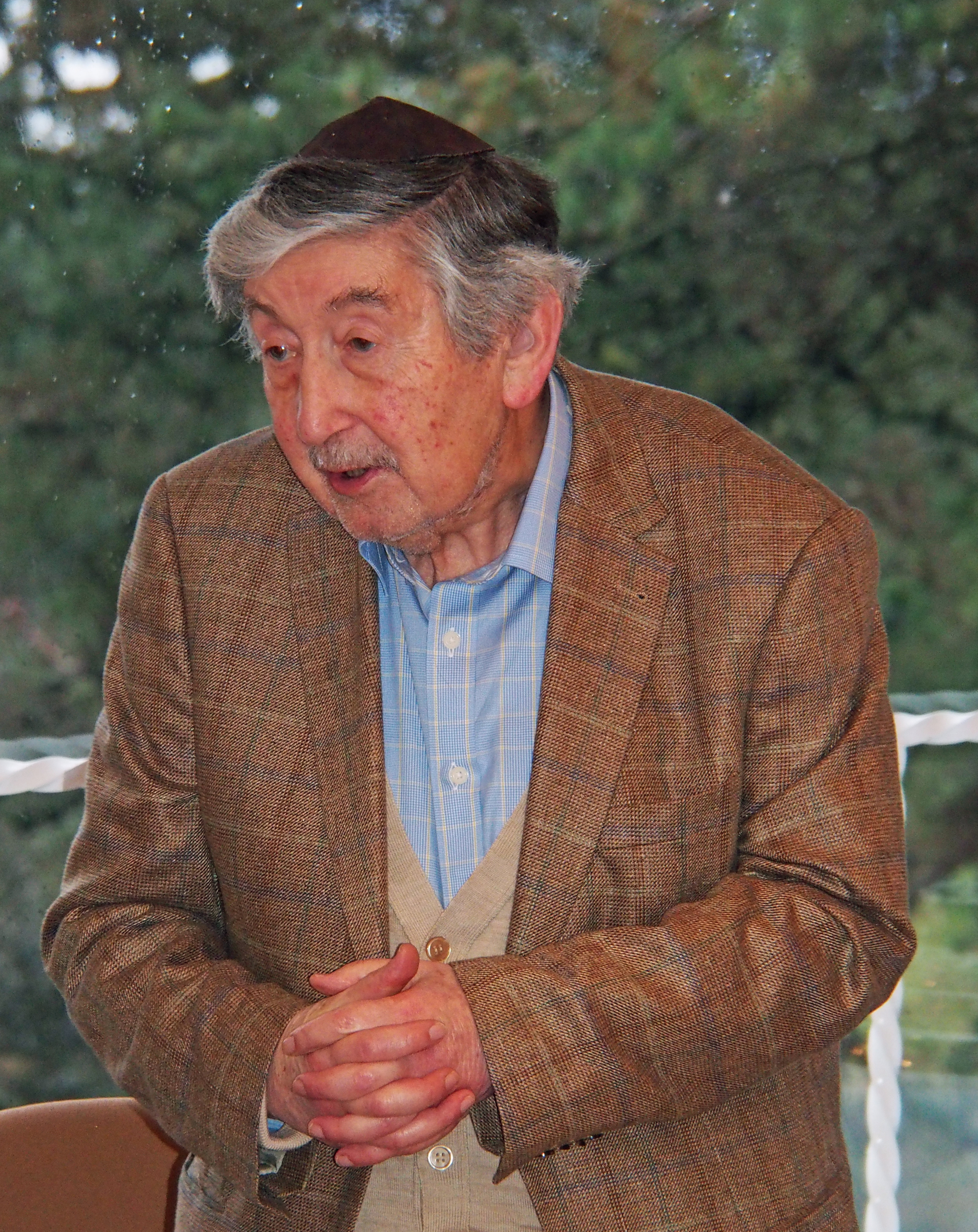
- Hutter in 2014
- Born: Otto Fred Hutter; 29 February 1924; Vienna, Austria
- Died: 22 November 2020 (aged 96); Bournemouth, England
- Citizenship: British (from 1947)
- Education: University College London
- Known for: nerve and muscle physiology; cardiac pacemaker potential
- Spouse: Yvonne Hutter
- Awards: Honorary Member of The Physiological Society
- Scientific career
- Fields: Physiology; membrane biophysics; electrophysiology
- Workplaces: University of Glasgow; University College London
- Doctoral advisor: Sir Charles Lovatt Evans
- Notable students: Denis Noble

Otto Fred Hutter (29 February 1924 – 22 November 2020) was an Austrian-born British physiologist who was Regius Professor of Physiology at the University of Glasgow.

== Biography ==
Hutter was born in Vienna, Austria in February 1924. His father, Isaak, from Lviv (now in Ukraine), had joined the Austro-Hungarian army to fight in the First World War, after which he settled in Austria. He married Elisabeth Grünberg, a nurse, and worked as an estate agent.

Hutter first attended secondary school at the Zwi Perez Chajes Gymnasium. He left Vienna in December 1938 as part of the Kindertransport which allowed Jewish children to escape the German annexation of Austria (the Anschluss). After arriving in the UK, he attended Bishop Stortford College as a boarder. He became a British citizen in 1947.

From 1942, after leaving school, Hutter worked as a laboratory technician at the Wellcome Research Laboratories in Beckenham, Kent. One project addressed the standardisation of penicillin production, then of considerable importance for the war effort.

== Academic career ==
Hutter studied physiology at Chelsea Polytechnic (now Chelsea College of Arts) and chemistry at Birkbeck College (now Birkbeck, University of London) at wartime evening classes. When the war ended, he took the BSc Physiology course at University College London.

His initial research was on acetylcholine actions in nerve and muscle. His work developed to address the permeation of potassium ions in muscle cells. During a Rockefeller travelling scholarship in Baltimore, at the laboratory of Stephen Kuffler, he worked with another visitor, Wolfgang Trautwein. They made the first recordings using microelectrodes of the pacemaker potential in heart muscle to study the cardiac pacemaker. They researched the actions of acetylcholine (which slows heart rate) or adrenaline (which speeds it). Their recordings, made in tortoise heart, have become iconic medical and physiological textbook images of these phenomena.

Another major research interest was the physiology of the chloride ion, a field which he summarised in a personal review.

Hutter was a lecturer in the Department of Physiology at University College, London until 1971 when he was appointed Regius Professor of Physiology at the University of Glasgow. He retired from his chair in 1990.

== Later life ==
In 2000 Hutter set up an annual Holocaust memorial lecture in Glasgow. He gave the 2018 lecture himself, entitled Exodus from Vienna, it told the story of what happened to his 37 classmates at the Chajes gymnasium. Hutter revisited his childhood haunts in Vienna in 2007.

Some of Hutter's grandchildren live in Israel and, after several visits to the country, Hutter became an Israeli citizen at the age of 95.

== Marriage and children ==
Hutter met Yvonne Brown, a nurse, whilst he was working in Beckenham. They were married in 1948 and had two sons and two daughters. His wife and one daughter predeceased him.

== Death ==
Hutter died on 22 November 2020 at the age of 96.
