= Regius Professor of Physiology (Glasgow) =

Regius Professorship of Physiology is a Regius Chair at the University of Glasgow that was founded in 1839 by Queen Victoria. It was originally titled the Regius Chair of Theory of Physic or Institutes of Medicine but the name changed to Regius Chair of Physiology in 1893.

== List of Regius Professors of Physiology ==
- 1839 to 1876: Andrew Buchanan
- 1876 to 1906: John Gray McKendrick
- 1906 to 1928: Noel Paton
- 1928 to 1947: Edward Provan Cathcart
- 1947 to 1970: Robert Campbell Garry
- 1971 to 1990: Otto Hutter
- 1991 to 2012: John Christie (Ian) McGrath
- 2012 to present: Tomasz Guzik
