= Constituency election results in the 1923 United Kingdom general election =

31st Parliament	(1918)
32nd Parliament	(1922)
33rd Parliament	(1923)
34th Parliament	(1924)
35th Parliament	(1929)

Results of the election by constituency

This is a complete alphabetical list of constituency election results to the 33rd Parliament of the United Kingdom at the 1923 general election, held on 5 December 1923.

== Notes ==
- Change in % vote and swing is calculated between the winner and second place and their respective performances at the 1922 election. A plus denotes a swing to the winner and a minus against the winner.

== England ==
The results in England are in a separate article for size reasons.

== Scotland ==
Aberdeen North
Party	Candidate	Votes	%	±%
Labour	Frank Rose	9,138	50.6	
Unionist	William Forbes Lumsden	4,820	26.7	n/a
Liberal	William Mackenzie Cameron	4,099	22.7	
Majority		4,318	23.9	
Turnout			53.0	
Labour hold		Swing		

Aberdeen South
Party	Candidate	Votes	%	±%
Unionist	Frederick Thomson	11,258	47.3	−10.7
Labour	John Paton	6,911	29.0	n/a
Liberal	Charles Mallet	5,641	23.7	−18.3
Majority		4,347	18.3	
Turnout				
Unionist hold		Swing		

Aberdeenshire Central
Party	Candidate	Votes	%	±%
Liberal	Murdoch McKenzie Wood	9,818	53.6	−6.5
Unionist	Robert Smith	8,507	46.4	+6.5
Majority		1,311	7.2	−13.0
Turnout			64.7	+7.8
Liberal hold		Swing	-6.5	

Aberdeenshire East
Party	Candidate	Votes	%	±%
Liberal	Frederick Martin	8,793	55.9	−4.6
Unionist	Falconer Lewis Wallace	6,949	44.1	n/a
Majority		1,844	11.8	−9.2
Turnout		15,742	57.6	+12.1
Liberal hold		Swing	n/a	

Aberdeenshire West & Kincardine
Party	Candidate	Votes	%	±%
Unionist	Malcolm Barclay-Harvey	6,639	51.0	n/a
Liberal	Arthur Murray	6,369	49.0	−12.4
Majority		270	2.0	26.6
Turnout			57.8	+13.2
Unionist gain from Liberal		Swing	n/a	

Argyllshire
Party	Candidate	Votes	%	±%
Liberal	William Sutherland	9,020	52.7	−6.1
Unionist	F. A. Macquisten	8,100	47.3	n/a
Majority		920	5.4	
Turnout		17,120	53.3	
Liberal gain from National Liberal		Swing	n/a	

Ayr Burghs
Party	Candidate	Votes	%	±%
Unionist	John Baird	10,206	41.8	−2.7
Labour	John McDiarmid Airlie	7,732	31.7	+5.7
Liberal	William Henderson Pringle	6,467	26.5	−3.0
Majority		2,474	10.1	−4.9
Turnout			70.0	−1.1
Unionist hold		Swing	-4.2	

Ayrshire North & Bute
Party	Candidate	Votes	%	±%
Unionist	Aylmer Hunter-Weston	12,320	55.6	
Labour	Peter Campbell Stephen	9,855	44.4	
Majority		2,465	11.2	
Turnout			55.9	
Unionist hold		Swing		

Ayrshire South
Party	Candidate	Votes	%	±%
Labour	James Brown	11,169	55.9	
Unionist	Charles Fergusson	8,807	44.1	
Majority		2,362	11.8	
Turnout			65.7	
Labour hold		Swing		

Banffshire
Party	Candidate	Votes	%	±%
Liberal	Charles Barrie	unopposed	n/a	n/a
Liberal hold		Swing	n/a	

Berwick and Haddington
Party	Candidate	Votes	%	±%
Labour	Robert Spence	8,576	37.0	
Unionist	Chichester Crookshank	8,508	36.7	n/a
Liberal	Walter Waring	6,084	26.3	
Majority		68	0.3	
Turnout			69.4	
Labour gain from National Liberal		Swing		

Bothwell
Party	Candidate	Votes	%	±%
Labour	John Robertson	14,211	60.2	
Unionist	Peter Denniston Ridge-Beedle	7,569	32.0	
Liberal	John Dick Scott	1,846	7.8	
Majority		6,642	28.2	
Turnout			73.1	
Labour hold		Swing		

Caithness and Sutherland
Party	Candidate	Votes	%	±%
Liberal	Archibald Sinclair	unopposed	n/a	n/a
Liberal hold		Swing	n/a	

Clackmannan and Eastern Stirlingshire
Party	Candidate	Votes	%	±%
Labour	MacNeill Weir	10,492	51.1	
Liberal	Craigie Aitchison	10,043	48.9	
Majority		449	2.2	
Turnout			64.2	
Labour hold		Swing		

Coatbridge
Party	Candidate	Votes	%	±%
Labour	James C. Welsh	12,292	55.5	
Unionist	J.B. Young	9,865	44.5	
Majority		2,427	11.0	
Turnout			71.7	
Labour hold		Swing		

Dumbarton Burghs
Party	Candidate	Votes	%	±%
Labour	David Kirkwood	13,472	61.3	
Unionist	Walter Black Munro	8,520	38.7	
Majority		4,952	22.6	
Turnout			68.0	
Labour hold		Swing		

Dumfriesshire
Party	Candidate	Votes	%	±%
Liberal	William Chapple	13,107	53.5	−1.1
Unionist	John Charteris	11,380	46.5	+1.1
Majority		1,727	7.0	−2.2
Turnout		24,487		
Liberal hold		Swing	-1.1	

Dunbartonshire
Party	Candidate	Votes	%	±%
Labour	William Martin	11,705	43.0	−6.6
Unionist	David Fleming	9,802	36.0	−14.4
Liberal	Stanley Holmes	5,726	21.0	n/a
Majority		1,903	7.0	7.8
Turnout			70.7	+1.7
Labour gain from Unionist		Swing	+3.9	

Dundee (2 seats)
Party	Candidate	Votes	%	±%
Scottish Prohibition	Edwin Scrymgeour	25,753	25.1	−2.5
Labour	E. D. Morel	23,345	22.7	−2.9
Liberal	John Pratt	23,031	22.4	+16.7
Unionist	Frederick William Wallace	20,253	19.7	n/a
Communist	Willie Gallacher	10,380	10.1	+5.1
Majority		2,722	2.7	
Majority		314	0.3	
Turnout			72.5	−8.0
Scottish Prohibition hold		Swing		
Labour hold		Swing		

Dunfermline Burghs
Party	Candidate	Votes	%	±%
Labour	William McLean Watson	12,606	53.6	+3.2
Liberal	John Wallace	10,931	46.4	−3.2
Majority		1,675	7.2	+6.4
Turnout		23,537	77.7	+0.2
Labour hold		Swing	3.2	

Edinburgh Central
Party	Candidate	Votes	%	±%
Labour	William Graham	13,186	67.9	+10.0
Liberal	Thomas Lamb	6,225	32.1	−10.0
Majority		6,961	35.8	+20.0
Turnout			59.7	−12.1
Labour hold		Swing	+10.0	

Edinburgh East
Party	Candidate	Votes	%	±%
Liberal	James Hogge	10,876	68.3	+8.5
Unionist	Charles John Morris Mancor	5,045	31.7	n/a
Majority		5,831	36.6	17.0
Turnout		15,921	58.5	−7.5
Liberal hold		Swing	n/a	

Edinburgh North
Party	Candidate	Votes	%	±%
Liberal	Peter Raffan	13,744	55.7	+17.5
Unionist	Patrick Ford	10,909	44.3	−17.5
Majority		2,835	11.4	35.0
Turnout		24,653	66.3	
Liberal gain from Unionist		Swing	+17.5	

Edinburgh South
Party	Candidate	Votes	%	±%
Unionist	Samuel Chapman	12,804	55.7	
Liberal	William Hope	10,194	44.3	
Majority		2,610	11.4	
Turnout			70.2	
Unionist hold		Swing		

Edinburgh West
Party	Candidate	Votes	%	±%
Liberal	Vivian Phillipps	11,010	41.3	−10.1
Unionist	Ian Macintyre	8,778	33.0	−15.6
Labour	George Mathers	6,836	25.7	n/a
Majority		2,232	8.3	+5.5
Turnout			74.4	−5.5
Liberal hold		Swing	+2.8	

Fife East
Party	Candidate	Votes	%	±%
Liberal	James Duncan Millar	12,825	55.5	−0.5
Unionist	Alexander Sprot	10,275	44.5	+0.5
Majority		2,550	11.0	−1.0
Turnout		23,100	67.8	+0.6
Liberal hold		Swing	-0.5	

Fife West
Party	Candidate	Votes	%	±%
Labour	William Adamson	12,204	65.4	n/a
Independent Labour	Philip Hodge	6,459	34.6	n/a
Majority		5,745	30.8	n/a
Turnout		18,663	57.4	n/a
Labour hold		Swing	n/a	

Forfarshire
Party	Candidate	Votes	%	±%
Liberal	James Falconer	7,605	52.9	−1.9
Unionist	William T. Shaw	6,758	47.1	+1.9
Majority		847	5.8	−3.8
Turnout			60.3	−4.7
Liberal hold		Swing	-1.9	

Galloway
Party	Candidate	Votes	%	±%
Liberal	Cecil Dudgeon	unopposed	n/a	n/a
Liberal hold		Swing	n/a	

Glasgow Bridgeton
Party	Candidate	Votes	%	±%
Labour	James Maxton	15,735	64.8	
Unionist	J. B. Black	6,101	25.1	
Liberal	Thomas Randall Anderson	2,445	10.1	
Majority		9,634	39.7	
Turnout			66.5	
Labour hold		Swing		

Glasgow Camlachie
Party	Candidate	Votes	%	±%
Labour	Campbell Stephen	14,143	56.2	
Unionist	Henry Keith	11,027	43.8	
Majority		3,116	12.4	
Turnout			71.8	
Labour hold		Swing		

Glasgow Cathcart
Party	Candidate	Votes	%	±%
Unionist	Robert MacDonald	10,817	42.3	
Labour	John Primrose Hay	8,884	34.7	
Liberal	Thomas Graham Robertson	5,894	23.0	
Majority		1,933	7.6	
Turnout		25,595		
Unionist gain from Labour		Swing		

Glasgow Central
Party	Candidate	Votes	%	±%
Unionist	William Alexander	13,392	45.8	
Labour	Edward Mitchell	12,976	44.4	
Liberal	Harold Tennant	2,870	9.8	
Majority		416	1.4	
Turnout			67.5	
Unionist hold		Swing		

Glasgow Gorbals
Party	Candidate	Votes	%	±%
Labour	George Buchanan	17,211	67.2	
Unionist	Robert McLellan	8,392	32.8	n/a
Majority		8,819	34.4	
Turnout			63.5	
Labour hold		Swing		

Glasgow Govan
Party	Candidate	Votes	%	±%
Labour	Neil Maclean	13,987	66.3	
Liberal	Harry Watt	7,095	33.7	
Majority		6,892	32.6	
Turnout			68.5	
Labour hold		Swing		

Glasgow Hillhead
Party	Candidate	Votes	%	±%
Unionist	Robert Horne	9,757	51.0	−11.7
Labour	John Laing Kinloch	5,059	26.4	n/a
Liberal	Edwin James Donaldson	4,331	22.6	−14.7
Majority		4,698	24.6	−0.8
Turnout			73.2	−2.3
Unionist hold		Swing	n/a	

Glasgow Kelvingrove
Party	Candidate	Votes	%	±%
Unionist	William Hutchison	11,025	42.9	−11.9
Communist	Aitken Ferguson	10,021	39.0	n/a
Liberal	Alexander James Grieve	4,662	18.1	−27.1
Majority		1,004	3.9	−5.7
Turnout			68.2	+3.7
Unionist hold		Swing	n/a	

Glasgow Maryhill
Party	Candidate	Votes	%	±%
Labour	John Muir	12,508	48.1	
Unionist	James Couper	10,342	39.7	
Liberal	Walter Crawford Smith	3,179	12.2	
Majority		2,166	8.4	
Turnout			77.1	
Labour hold		Swing		

Glasgow Partick
Party	Candidate	Votes	%	±%
Labour	Andrew Young	8,397	44.0	n/a
Unionist	Allan Smith	6,315	33.1	n/a
Liberal	MacCallum Scott	4,358	22.9	
Majority		2,082	10.9	
Turnout			71.1	
Labour gain from National Liberal		Swing	n/a	

Glasgow Pollok
Party	Candidate	Votes	%	±%
Unionist	John Gilmour	14,013	67.2	
Labour	John Rankin	6,836	32.8	
Majority		7,177	34.4	
Turnout			66.0	
Unionist hold		Swing		

Glasgow Shettleston
Party	Candidate	Votes	%	±%
Labour	John Wheatley	12,624	59.8	
Liberal	Francis John Robertson	8,471	40.2	
Majority		4,153	19.6	
Turnout			71.0	
Labour hold		Swing		

Glasgow Springburn
Party	Candidate	Votes	%	±%
Labour	George Hardie	14,535	62.3	+1.8
Unionist	David Alexander Guild	8,814	37.7	−1.8
Majority		5,721	24.6	+3.6
Turnout		23,349	68.1	−10.4
Labour hold		Swing	+1.8	

Glasgow St Rollox
Party	Candidate	Votes	%	±%
Labour	James Stewart	15,240	62.3	
Unionist	Violet Mary Robertson	9,204	37.7	
Majority		6,036	24.6	
Turnout			65.6	
Labour hold		Swing		

Glasgow Tradeston
Party	Candidate	Votes	%	±%
Labour	Thomas Henderson	12,787	60.1	
Liberal	Douglas Macdonald	8,479	39.9	
Majority		4,308	20.2	
Turnout			63.1	
Labour hold		Swing		

Greenock
Party	Candidate	Votes	%	±%
Liberal	Godfrey Collins	16,337	61.3	+24.7
Communist	Alec Geddes	10,335	38.7	+4.6
Majority		6,002	22.6	+20.1
Turnout			78.4	−6.4
Liberal hold		Swing	+10.0	

Hamilton
Party	Candidate	Votes	%	±%
Labour	Duncan Graham	11,858	58.4	+0.8
Liberal	Helen Fraser	8,436	41.6	n/a
Majority		3,422	16.8	+1.6
Turnout			73.5	−4.8
Labour hold		Swing	n/a	

Inverness
Party	Candidate	Votes	%	±%
Liberal	Murdoch Macdonald	10,194	65.4	
Labour	Andrew D. Kinloch	5,385	34.6	n/a
Majority		4,809	30.8	
Turnout			46.9	
Liberal hold		Swing	n/a	

Kilmarnock
Party	Candidate	Votes	%	±%
Labour	Robert Climie	10,992	43.2	−2.1
Liberal	Donald Maclean	8,185	32.1	−22.6
Unionist	Alexander Morrice Mackay	6,298	24.7	n/a
Majority		2,807	11.1	20.5
Turnout			75.7	+4.2
Labour gain from Liberal		Swing	+10.2	

Kinross and Western Perthshire
Party	Candidate	Votes	%	±%
Unionist	Katharine Stewart-Murray	9,235	50.4	n/a
Liberal	Percy Molteno	9,085	49.6	n/a
Majority		150	0.8	n/a
Turnout			72.6	n/a
Unionist gain from National Liberal		Swing		

Kirkcaldy Burghs
Party	Candidate	Votes	%	±%
Labour	Tom Kennedy	14,221	54.4	+5.8
Liberal	Robert Hutchison	11,937	45.6	−5.8
Majority		2,284	8.8	11.6
Turnout			81.7	+2.4
Labour gain from Liberal		Swing	+5.8	

Lanark
Party	Candidate	Votes	%	±%
Labour	Thomas Dickson	11,384	50.5	
Unionist	Walter Elliot	11,154	49.5	
Majority		230	1.0	
Turnout			74.9	
Labour gain from Unionist		Swing		

North Lanarkshire
Party	Candidate	Votes	%	±%
Labour	Joseph Sullivan	10,526	50.5	
Unionist	Alexander McClure	7,165	34.3	
Liberal	Edward Rolland McNab	3,168	15.2	
Majority		3,361	16.2	
Turnout			65.3	
Labour hold		Swing		

Leith
Party	Candidate	Votes	%	±%
Liberal	William Wedgwood Benn	15,004	64.5	
Labour	Robert Freeman Wilson	8,267	35.5	
Majority		6,737	29.0	
Turnout			59.1	
Liberal hold		Swing		

Linlithgowshire
Party	Candidate	Votes	%	±%
Labour	Manny Shinwell	13,304	50.9	
Unionist	James Kidd	8,149	31.2	
Liberal	James Johnston	4,691	17.9	
Majority		5,155	19.7	
Turnout			71.7	
Labour hold		Swing		

Midlothian and Peebles Northern
Party	Candidate	Votes	%	±%
Labour	Andrew Clarke	8,570		
Unionist	George Hutchison	6,731		
Liberal	Charles de Bois Murray	3,578		
Majority		1,839		
Turnout			74.8	
Labour gain from Unionist		Swing		

Montrose Burghs
Party	Candidate	Votes	%	±%
Liberal	John Sturrock	8,717	55.3	
Labour	John Carnegie	7,032	44.7	
Majority		1,685	10.6	
Turnout			62.9	
Liberal hold		Swing		

Moray & Nairn
Party	Candidate	Votes	%	±%
Unionist	James Stuart	8,116	53.4	n/a
Liberal	Thomas Maule Guthrie	7,089	46.6	n/a
Majority		1,027	6.8	10.4
Turnout		15,215	61.3	+12.3
Unionist gain from Liberal		Swing	n/a	

Motherwell
Party	Candidate	Votes	%	±%
Unionist	Hugh Ferguson	9,793	42.0	+12.9
Communist	Walton Newbold	8,712	37.4	+4.1
Liberal	John Maxwell	4,799	20.6	−1.0
Majority		1,081	4.6	14.8
Turnout			77.4	−4.1
Unionist gain from Communist		Swing	+4.4	

Orkney and Shetland
Party	Candidate	Votes	%	±%
Liberal	Robert Hamilton	5,129	54.3	+0.8
Unionist	Robert Boothby	4,318	45.7	n/a
Majority		811	8.6	+1.6
Turnout		9,447	39.1	+1.7
Liberal hold		Swing		

Paisley
Party	Candidate	Votes	%	±%
Liberal	H H Asquith	9,723	33.4	−17.1
Labour	John McLaren Biggar	7,977	27.4	−22.1
Unionist	MacInnes Shaw	7,758	26.6	N/A
Independent Labour	D.D. Cormack	3,685	12.6	n/a
Majority		1,746	6.0	
Turnout				
Liberal hold		Swing	+2.5	

Peebles and Southern Midlothian
Party	Candidate	Votes	%	±%
Labour	Joseph Westwood	7,882	43.0	+7.0
Unionist	Archibald Crawford	6,203	33.8	+0.1
Liberal	William Mitchell	4,245	23.2	−7.1
Majority		1,679	9.2	+6.9
Turnout			76.9	+1.2
Labour hold		Swing	+3.4	

Perth
Party	Candidate	Votes	%	±%
Liberal	Robert Macgregor Mitchell	12,655	53.2	
Unionist	Noel Skelton	11,134	46.8	
Majority		1,521	6.4	
Turnout			68.7	
Liberal gain from Unionist		Swing		

Renfrewshire East
Party	Candidate	Votes	%	±%
Labour	Robert Nichol	9,857	44.6	
Unionist	Frederick Lobnitz	9,349	42.3	
Liberal	William Crawford	2,887	13.1	
Majority		508	2.3	
Turnout			75.9	
Labour hold		Swing		

Renfrewshire West
Party	Candidate	Votes	%	±%
Labour	Robert Murray	10,904	48.1	
Unionist	Alexander Thomson Taylor	7,602	33.6	n/a
Liberal	James Scott	4,149	18.3	n/a
Majority		3,302	14.5	
Turnout			77.0	
Labour hold		Swing		

Ross and Cromarty
Party	Candidate	Votes	%	±%
Liberal	Ian Macpherson	unopposed	n/a	n/a
Liberal hold		Swing	n/a	

Roxburgh & Selkirk
Party	Candidate	Votes	%	±%
Unionist	Walter Montagu Douglas Scott	11,258	43.1	n/a
Liberal	Thomas Henderson	8,046	30.8	n/a
Labour	George Dallas	6,811	26.1	n/a
Majority		3,212	12.3	n/a
Turnout		26,115	78.2	+17.3
Unionist gain from Liberal		Swing	n/a	

Rutherglen
Party	Candidate	Votes	%	±%
Labour	William Wright	13,021	54.5	
Unionist	Robert McLaren	7,652	32.1	n/a
Liberal	John Taylor	3,201	13.4	n/a
Majority		5,369	22.4	
Turnout			72.3	
Labour hold		Swing		

Stirling and Falkirk
Party	Candidate	Votes	%	±%
Liberal	George McCrae	10,721	50.4	+3.7
Labour	Hugh Murnin	10,565	49.6	−3.7
Turnout			71.7	0.0
Majority		156	0.8	7.4
Liberal gain from Labour		Swing	+3.7	

Stirlingshire West
Party	Candidate	Votes	%	±%
Labour	Tom Johnston	9,242	51.9	
Unionist	Harry Hope	6,182	34.7	
Liberal	Robert Ian Aonas MacInnes	2,390	13.4	n/a
Majority		3,060	17.2	
Turnout			74.7	
Labour hold		Swing		

Western Isles
Party	Candidate	Votes	%	±%
Liberal	Alexander Livingstone	3,391	39.6	−6.3
Unionist	William Morrison	3,158	36.9	n/a
Independent Labour	Hugh McCowan	2,011	23.5	n/a
Majority		233	2.7	−5.5
Turnout		6,549	40.1	−14.0
Liberal gain from National Liberal		Swing	n/a	

== Wales ==
Aberavon
Party	Candidate	Votes	%	±%
Labour	Ramsay MacDonald	17,439	55.6	+9.0
Unionist	Sidney Hutchinson Byass	13,927	44.4	+8.3
Majority		3,512	11.2	+0.7
Turnout			87.2	+1.4
Labour hold		Swing	+0.3	

Aberdare
Party	Candidate	Votes	%	±%
Labour	George Hall	22,379	58.2	+1.0
Liberal	William M. Llewellyn	16,050	41.8	−1.0
Majority		6,329	16.4	+2.0
Turnout			83.3	+3.4
Labour hold		Swing	+1.0	

Abertillery
Party	Candidate	Votes	%	±%
Labour	George Barker	unopposed	n/a	n/a
Labour hold		Swing	n/a	

Anglesey
Party	Candidate	Votes	%	±%
Liberal	Robert Thomas	unopposed	n/a	n/a
Liberal hold		Swing	n/a	

Bedwellty
Party	Candidate	Votes	%	±%
Labour	Charles Edwards	17,564	67.6	+4.6
Liberal	William Henry Williams	8,436	32.4	n/a
Majority		9,128	35.2	+9.2
Turnout			74.2	−7.0
Labour hold		Swing	n/a	

Brecon and Radnor
Party	Candidate	Votes	%	±%
Liberal	William Jenkins	unopposed	n/a	n/a
Liberal hold		Swing	n/a	

Caerphilly
Party	Candidate	Votes	%	±%
Labour	Morgan Jones	16,535	58.7	+1.5
Unionist	Gwilym Rowlands	6,493	23.0	−19.8
Liberal	Samuel Roberts Jenkins	5,152	18.3	n/a
Majority		10,042	35.7	+21.3
Turnout			77.0	−1.6
Labour hold		Swing	+10.6	

Cardiff Central
Party	Candidate	Votes	%	±%
Unionist	James Childs Gould	10,261	38.4	−11.6
Labour	James Edward Edmunds	8,563	32.0	+2.6
Liberal	Ieuan Watkins Evans	7,923	29.6	+9.0
Majority		1,698	6.4	−14.2
Turnout			71.4	−3.0
Unionist hold		Swing	-7.1	

Cardiff East
Party	Candidate	Votes	%	±%
Liberal	Henry Webb	8,536	35.8	+4.0
Labour	Hugh Dalton	7,812	32.7	+1.3
Unionist	Lewis Lougher	7,513	31.5	−5.3
Majority		724	3.1	8.1
Turnout				
Liberal gain from Unionist		Swing	+4.1	

Cardiff South
Party	Candidate	Votes	%	±%
Labour	Arthur Henderson	7,899	37.9	+6.0
Unionist	James Cory	7,473	35.8	−0.6
Liberal	Walter Layton	5,474	26.3	−5.9
Majority		426	2.1	6.3
Turnout		20,846	70.6	−4.3
Labour gain from Unionist		Swing	+3.3	

Cardiganshire
Party	Candidate	Votes	%	±%
Independent Liberal	Rhys Hopkin Morris	12,469	46.9	−2.1
Liberal	Ernest Evans	7,391	27.7	−23.3
Unionist	Ernest Vaughan	6,776	25.4	n/a
Majority		5,078	19.2	21.2
Turnout			81.0	+4.1
Independent Liberal gain from National Liberal		Swing	+10.6	

Carmarthen
Party	Candidate	Votes	%	±%
Liberal	Ellis Ellis-Griffith	12,988	45.1	+32.3
Unionist	Alfred Stephens	8,677	30.1	+0.7
Labour	Rowland Williams	7,132	24.8	n/a
Majority		4,311	15.0	27.4
Turnout			78.3	−4.4
Liberal gain from National Liberal		Swing	n/a	

Carnarvon Boroughs
Party	Candidate	Votes	%	±%
Liberal	David Lloyd George	12,499	63.1	n/a
Unionist	Austin Jones	7,323	36.9	n/a
Majority		5,176	26.2	n/a
Turnout		19,822	80.9	n/a
Liberal hold		Swing	n/a	

Caernarvonshire
Party	Candidate	Votes	%	±%
Liberal	Goronwy Owen	15,043	52.7	+5.7
Labour	Robert Jones	13,521	47.3	−5.7
Majority		1,522	5.4	11.4
Turnout			74.9	+4.3
Liberal gain from Labour		Swing	+5.7	

Denbigh
Party	Candidate	Votes	%	±%
Liberal	Ellis Davies	12,164	59.8	+51.6
Unionist	Rhys David	8,186	40.2	+2.3
Majority		3,978	19.6	35.6
Turnout			63.6	−13.1
Liberal gain from National Liberal		Swing	+24.8	

Ebbw Vale
Party	Candidate	Votes	%	±%
Labour	Evan Davies	16,492	65.6	+0.2
Liberal	Cyrus Golyddon Davies	8,639	34.4	n/a
Majority		7,853	31.2	+0.4
Turnout		25,131	75.8	−2.4
Labour hold		Swing	n/a	

Flintshire
Party	Candidate	Votes	%	±%
Liberal	Tom Parry	19,609	56.8	+12.6
Unionist	Ernest Roberts	14,926	43.2	+3.6
Majority		4,683	13.6	+9.0
Turnout			69.4	−10.0
Liberal hold		Swing	+4.5	

Gower
Party	Candidate	Votes	%	±%
Labour	David Grenfell	14,771	59.1	+4.9
Liberal	Leah Norah Folland	10,219	40.9	−4.9
Majority		4,552	18.2	+9.8
Turnout			73.0	−1.6
Labour hold		Swing	+4.9	

Llandaff and Barry
Party	Candidate	Votes	%	±%
Unionist	William Cope	11,050	37.9	−6.2
Liberal	Elfyn William David	10,213	35.1	+9.6
Labour	Thomas F. Worrall	7,871	27.0	−3.4
Majority		837	2.8	−10.9
Turnout			72.1	−4.7
Unionist hold		Swing	-7.9	

Llanelly
Party	Candidate	Votes	%	±%
Labour	John Henry Williams	21,063	55.1	−3.6
Liberal	Richard Thomas Evans	11,765	30.7	−10.4
Unionist	Lionel Beaumont-Thomas	5,442	14.2	n/a
Majority		9,298	24.4	+5.8
Turnout			76.8	−3.5
Labour hold		Swing	n/a	

Merioneth
Party	Candidate	Votes	%	±%
Liberal	Henry Haydn Jones	11,005	60.5	+2.2
Labour	John Jones Roberts	7,181	39.5	+2.2
Majority		3,824	21.0	+4.4
Turnout			80.2	+3.1
Liberal hold		Swing	+2.2	

Merthyr
Party	Candidate	Votes	%	±%
Labour	R. C. Wallhead	19,511	60.1	+7.1
Liberal	David Rowland Thomas	7,403	22.8	n/a
Unionist	Arthur Charles Fox-Davies	5,548	17.1	n/a
Majority		12,108	37.3	+31.3
Turnout				
Labour hold		Swing	n/a	

Monmouth
Party	Candidate	Votes	%	±%
Unionist	Leolin Forestier-Walker	12,697	59.9	n/a
Liberal	Morgan Griffith	8,487	40.1	n/a
Majority		4,210	19.8	n/a
Turnout			80.9	n/a
Unionist hold		Swing	n/a	

Montgomeryshire
Party	Candidate	Votes	%	±%
Liberal	David Davies	unopposed	n/a	n/a
Liberal hold		Swing	n/a	

Neath
Party	Candidate	Votes	%	±%
Labour	William Jenkins	20,764	62.3	+2.8
Liberal	Thomas Elias	12,562	37.7	−2.8
Majority		8,202	24.6	+5.6
Turnout			73.9	−1.5
Labour hold		Swing	+2.8	

Newport
Party	Candidate	Votes	%	±%
Unionist	Reginald Clarry	14,424	39.5	−14.8
Labour	William Bowen	14,100	38.6	−7.1
Liberal	H. Davies	8,015	21.9	n/a
Majority		324	0.9	−7.7
Turnout			85.2	+3.1
Unionist hold		Swing	-3.8	

Ogmore
Party	Candidate	Votes	%	±%
Labour	Vernon Hartshorn	unopposed	n/a	n/a
Labour hold		Swing	n/a	

Pembrokeshire
Party	Candidate	Votes	%	±%
Liberal	Gwilym Lloyd George	13,173	38.3	−30.7
Unionist	Charles Price	11,682	34.0	n/a
Labour	William James Jenkins	9,511	27.7	−3.3
Majority		1,491	4.3	−33.7
Turnout			77.9	
Liberal hold		Swing	n/a	

Pontypool
Party	Candidate	Votes	%	±%
Labour	Thomas Griffiths	13,770	50.6	+10.0
Liberal	Samuel John Robins	13,444	49.4	+21.4
Majority		326	1.2	−8.0
Turnout			81.6	
Labour hold		Swing	-5.7	

Pontypridd
Party	Candidate	Votes	%	±%
Labour	Thomas Mardy Jones	16,837	54.9	+7.7
Liberal	Jon David Rees	13,839	45.1	+19.8
Majority		2,998	9.8	−9.9
Turnout		30,676	76.0	−0.8
Labour hold		Swing	−6.0	

Rhondda East
Party	Candidate	Votes	%	±%
Labour	David Watts-Morgan	21,338	71.9	+16.9
Unionist	Alfred John Orchard	8,346	28.1	n/a
Majority		12,992	43.8	+33.8
Turnout			74.6	−6.3
Labour hold		Swing	n/a	

Rhondda West
Party	Candidate	Votes	%	±%
Labour	William John	18,206	65.4	+3.3
Liberal	John Robert Jones	9,640	34.6	NA
Majority		8,566	30.8	+6.6
Turnout		27,846	78.5	−5.2
Labour hold		Swing	n/a	

Swansea East
Party	Candidate	Votes	%	±%
Labour	David Williams	12,735	57.4	+6.5
Liberal	Thomas Artemus Jones	9,463	42.6	−6.5
Majority		3,272	14.8	+13.0
Turnout			81.1	−0.6
Labour hold		Swing	+6.5	

Swansea West
Party	Candidate	Votes	%	±%
Labour	Howel Samuel	9,260	34.8	+2.7
Liberal	Alfred Mond	9,145	34.3	−1.2
Unionist	William Hewins	8,238	30.9	−1.5
Majority		115	0.5	n/a
Turnout			85.3	+1.4
Labour gain from Liberal		Swing	+1.9	

Wrexham
Party	Candidate	Votes	%	±%
Labour	Robert Richards	12,918	39.0	+3.2
Liberal	Horace Alexander Morgan	11,037	33.4	+0.8
Unionist	Edmund Fleming Bushby	9,131	27.6	−4.0
Majority		1,881	5.6	+2.4
Turnout			81.1	−3.3
Labour hold		Swing	+1.2	

== Northern Ireland ==
Antrim (2 seats)
Party	Candidate	Votes	%	±%
UUP	Charles Craig	unopposed	n/a	n/a
UUP	Hugh O'Neill	unopposed	n/a	n/a
UUP hold		Swing	n/a	

Armagh
Party	Candidate	Votes	%	±%
UUP	William Allen	unopposed	n/a	n/a
UUP hold		Swing	n/a	

Belfast East
Party	Candidate	Votes	%	±%
UUP	Herbert Dixon	unopposed	n/a	n/a
UUP hold		Swing	n/a	

Belfast North
Party	Candidate	Votes	%	±%
UUP	Thomas McConnell	16,771	52.5	n/a
Ind. Unionist	Tommy Henderson	15,171	47.5	n/a
Majority		1,600	5.0	n/a
Turnout		31,942	68.2	n/a
UUP hold		Swing	n/a	

Belfast South
Party	Candidate	Votes	%	±%
UUP	Thomas Moles	unopposed	n/a	n/a
UUP hold		Swing	n/a	

Belfast West
Party	Candidate	Votes	%	±%
UUP	Robert Lynn	24,975	52.9	n/a
Belfast Labour	Harry Midgley	22,255	47.1	n/a
Majority		2,720	5.8	n/a
Turnout			70.3	n/a
UUP hold		Swing		

Down (2 seats)
Party	Candidate	Votes	%	±%
UUP	David Reid	unopposed	n/a	n/a
UUP	John Simms	unopposed	n/a	n/a
UUP hold		Swing	n/a	

Fermanagh and Tyrone (2 seats)
Party	Candidate	Votes	%	±%
Nationalist	Thomas Harbison	44,003	27.0	0.0
Nationalist	Cahir Healy	43,668	26.8	0.0
UUP	James Pringle	37,733	23.1	0.0
UUP	Charles Falls	37,682	23.1	0.0
Majority		5,935	3.7	0.0
Turnout				
Nationalist hold		Swing	0.0	

Londonderry
Party	Candidate	Votes	%	±%
UUP	Malcolm Macnaghten	unopposed	n/a	n/a
UUP hold		Swing	n/a	

== Universities ==
Cambridge University (2 seats)
Party	Candidate	FPv%	Count	
Party	Candidate	FPv%	1	2
Unionist	John Rawlinson	40.85	4,207	
Unionist	Geoffrey G. Butler	27.61	2,844	3,560
Independent Liberal	J. R. M. Butler	31.54	3,248	3,283
Electorate: 14,974 Valid: 10,229 Quota: 3,434 Turnout: 68.78%

Combined English Universities (2 seats)
Party	Candidate	Votes	%	±%
Unionist	Martin Conway	1,711	44.1	+11.3
Liberal	H. A. L. Fisher	1,316	34.0	+5.3
Labour	Joseph John Findlay	850	21.9	+9.7
Turnout		5,008	77.4	+3.1

Combined Scottish Universities
Party	Candidate	Votes	%	±%
Unionist	George Berry	unopposed	n/a	n/a
Liberal	Dugald Cowan	unopposed	n/a	n/a
Unionist	Henry Craik	unopposed	n/a	n/a

London University
Party	Candidate	Votes	%	±%
Unionist	Sydney Russell-Wells	4,037	50.15	−1.4
Liberal	Albert Pollard	2,593	32.21	+2.9
Labour	H. G. Wells	1,420	17.64	−1.5
Majority		1,444	17.94	−4.3
Turnout		8,050	71.3	+3.6
Unionist hold		Swing	-2.1	

Oxford University (2 seats)
Party	Candidate	FPv%	Count	
Party	Candidate	FPv%	1	2
Unionist	Hugh Cecil	43.77	3,560	
Unionist	Charles Oman	27.12	2,206	2,950
Liberal	Gilbert Murray	29.11	2,368	2,472
Electorate: 10,814 Valid: 8,134 Quota: 2,712 Turnout: 75.22%

Queen's University of Belfast
Party	Candidate	Votes	%	±%
UUP	Thomas Sinclair	unopposed	n/a	n/a
UUP hold		Swing	n/a	

University of Wales
Party	Candidate	Votes	%	±%
Christian Pacifist	George M. Ll. Davies	570	35.7	n/a
Liberal	Joseph Jones	560	35.1	−0.8
Independent Liberal	John Edwards	467	29.2	n/a
Majority		10	0.6	n/a
Turnout			83.1	−4.1
Independent gain from Liberal		Swing	n/a	
