= 1958 Glasgow Kelvingrove by-election =

UK by-election

The 1958 Glasgow Kelvingrove by-election of 13 March 1958 was held after the death of Conservative MP Walter Elliot.

The seat was marginal, having been won by the Conservatives at the 1955 United Kingdom general election by just short of 3,000 votes. Elliot's widow Katharine Elliot stood to replace her husband as a Unionist, but she was defeated by Labour's Mary McAlister.

== Background ==
A former cabinet minister, Walter Elliot had first been elected for the seat in 1924, having previously been MP for Lanark. He had lost the seat in the Labour landslide of 1945, but after sitting as an MP for the Scottish Universities, had fought it again in 1950 and regained it.

David Murray, who stood as a 'Liberal Home-ruler' was not officially endorsed by the Liberal Party, but Scottish Liberal chairman J. M. Bannerman spoke in his favour "as an individual".

== Result of the previous general election ==
General election 1955: Glasgow Kelvingrove
Party	Candidate	Votes	%	±%
Conservative	Walter Elliot	14,854	55.38	+3.0
Labour	John Williams	11,966	44.62	−3.0
Majority		2,888	10.76	+6.0
Turnout		26,820		
Conservative hold		Swing		

== Result of the by-election ==
By-election 1958: Glasgow Kelvingrove
Party	Candidate	Votes	%	±%
Labour	Mary McAlister	10,210	48.00	+3.38
Conservative	Katharine Elliot	8,850	41.61	−13.77
Independent Liberal	David Murray	1,622	7.63	New
Ind. Labour Party	William C. Park	587	2.76	New
Majority		1,360	6.39	N/A
Turnout		21,269		
Labour gain from Conservative		Swing	+8.67	
