= East Kilbride (UK Parliament constituency) =

UK Parliament constituency (1974–2005)

- Former county constituency for the House of Commons
- Boundary of East Kilbride in Scotland for the 2001 general election
- Subdivisions of Scotland: South Lanarkshire
- Major settlements: East Kilbride

1974–2005
- Seats: One
- Created from: Lanark
- Replaced by: East Kilbride, Strathaven and Lesmahagow

East Kilbride was a county constituency of the House of Commons of the Parliament of the United Kingdom (at Westminster) from 1974 until 2005. It returned one Member of Parliament (MP), elected by the first-past-the-post voting system.

At the 2005 general election it was merged with part of Clydesdale to form the new constituency of East Kilbride, Strathaven and Lesmahagow.

The East Kilbride Holyrood constituency, created to be coterminous in 1999, continues in use for elections to the Scottish Parliament.

== Boundaries ==
1974–1983: The burgh of East Kilbride, the fourth district electoral division of Avondale, and the eighth district electoral divisions of Blantyre, High Blantyre, and Stonefield.

1983–1996: East Kilbride District.

== Members of Parliament ==
| Election | Member | Party | Notes |
|---|---|---|---|
| Feb 1974 | Maurice Miller | Labour | Previously MP for Glasgow Kelvingrove from 1964 |
| 1987 | Adam Ingram | Labour | Subsequently, MP for East Kilbride, Strathaven and Lesmahagow from 2005 |
| 2005 | constituency abolished | | |

== Elections ==
=== Elections of the 1970s ===
General election February 1974: East Kilbride
| Party | Candidate | Votes | % | ±% |
|---|---|---|---|---|
| Labour | Maurice Miller | 23,424 | 43.9 | |
| Conservative | Gilmour William Parvin | 15,456 | 29.0 | |
| SNP | Donald Paul MacQuarie | 13,819 | 25.9 | |
| Communist | David McDowell | 693 | 1.3 | |
| Majority | | 7,968 | 14.9 | |
| Turnout | | 53,392 | 80.8 | |
| Labour win (new seat) | | | | |

General election October 1974: East Kilbride
| Party | Candidate | Votes | % | ±% |
|---|---|---|---|---|
| Labour | Maurice Miller | 21,810 | 41.9 | −2.0 |
| SNP | Gordon Murray | 19,106 | 36.7 | +10.8 |
| Conservative | Gilmour William Parvin | 8,513 | 16.4 | −12.6 |
| Liberal | David Miller | 2,644 | 5.1 | New |
| Majority | | 2,704 | 5.2 | −9.7 |
| Turnout | | 52,073 | 79.1 | −1.7 |
| Labour hold | | Swing | | |

General election 1979: East Kilbride
| Party | Candidate | Votes | % | ±% |
|---|---|---|---|---|
| Labour | Maurice Miller | 31,401 | 53.9 | +12.0 |
| Conservative | William Guthrie Hodgson | 17,128 | 29.4 | +13.0 |
| SNP | Gordon Murray | 9,090 | 15.6 | −21.1 |
| Communist | David McDowell | 658 | 1.1 | New |
| Majority | | 14,273 | 24.5 | +19.3 |
| Turnout | | 58,277 | 79.7 | +0.6 |
| Labour hold | | Swing | | |

=== Elections of the 1980s ===
General election 1983: East Kilbride
| Party | Candidate | Votes | % | ±% |
|---|---|---|---|---|
| Labour | Maurice Miller | 17,535 | 37.1 | −7.6 |
| SDP | Denis Sullivan | 13,199 | 27.9 | New |
| Conservative | Richard Scott | 11,483 | 24.3 | −0.5 |
| SNP | David Urquhart | 4,795 | 10.2 | −5.4 |
| Communist | William Doolan | 256 | 0.5 | −0.1 |
| Majority | | 4,336 | 9.2 | |
| Turnout | | 47,268 | 77.0 | −2.7 |
| Labour hold | | Swing | | |

General election 1987: East Kilbride
| Party | Candidate | Votes | % | ±% |
|---|---|---|---|---|
| Labour | Adam Ingram | 24,491 | 49.0 | +11.9 |
| SDP | Denis Sullivan | 11,867 | 23.7 | −4.2 |
| Conservative | Paul Walker | 7,344 | 14.7 | −9.6 |
| SNP | James Taggart | 6,275 | 12.6 | +2.4 |
| Majority | | 12,624 | 25.3 | +16.1 |
| Turnout | | 43,481 | 79.2 | +2.2 |
| Labour hold | | Swing | +8.0 | |

=== Elections of the 1990s ===
General election 1992: East Kilbride
| Party | Candidate | Votes | % | ±% |
|---|---|---|---|---|
| Labour | Adam Ingram | 24,055 | 46.9 | −2.1 |
| SNP | Kathleen McAlorum | 12,063 | 23.5 | +10.9 |
| Conservative | Gordon M. Lind | 9,781 | 19.1 | +4.4 |
| Liberal Democrats | Sandra Grieve | 5,377 | 10.5 | −13.2 |
| Majority | | 11,992 | 23.4 | −1.9 |
| Turnout | | 51,276 | 80.0 | +0.8 |
| Labour hold | | Swing | | |

General election 1997: East Kilbride
| Party | Candidate | Votes | % | ±% |
|---|---|---|---|---|
| Labour | Adam Ingram | 27,584 | 56.5 | +9.6 |
| SNP | George Gebbie | 10,200 | 20.9 | −2.6 |
| Conservative | Clifford Herbertson | 5,863 | 12.0 | +0.9 |
| Liberal Democrats | Kate Philbrick | 3,527 | 7.2 | −3.3 |
| Prolife Alliance | John A. Deighan | 1,170 | 2.4 | New |
| Referendum | Julie Gray | 306 | 0.6 | New |
| Natural Law | Ewan Gilmour | 146 | 0.3 | New |
| Majority | | 17,384 | 35.6 | +12.2 |
| Turnout | | 48,796 | 74.8 | −5.2 |
| Labour hold | | Swing | | |

=== Elections of the 2000s ===
General election 2001: East Kilbride
| Party | Candidate | Votes | % | ±% |
|---|---|---|---|---|
| Labour | Adam Ingram | 22,205 | 53.3 | −3.2 |
| SNP | Archie Buchanan | 9,450 | 22.7 | +1.8 |
| Liberal Democrats | Ewan Hawthorn | 4,278 | 10.3 | +3.1 |
| Conservative | Margaret McCulloch | 4,238 | 10.2 | −1.8 |
| Scottish Socialist | David Stevenson | 1,519 | 3.6 | New |
| Majority | | 12,755 | 30.6 | −5.0 |
| Turnout | | 41,690 | 62.6 | −12.2 |
| Labour hold | | Swing | | |
