= Alexander James Grieve =

British theologian (1874–1952)

Rev. Alexander James Grieve (18 March 1874 – 23 September 1952) was a British theologian, writer and Liberal Party politician.

== Background ==
Grieve was born the eldest son of John Grieve. He was educated at University College, Aberystwyth, Mansfield College, Oxford and the University of Berlin. He obtained a First Class Honors in Theology at Oxford in 1897 and London in 1912. In 1897 he married Evelyne Mary Thomas. They had four sons and two daughters.

== Professional career ==
Grieve was Principal of Lancashire Independent College from 1922 to 1943 and Principal Emeritus from 1943.

== Political career ==
Grieve was Liberal candidate for the Glasgow Kelvingrove division at the 1923 General Election. He did not stand for parliament again.

=== Electoral record ===
General Election 1923: Glasgow Kelvingrove
Party	Candidate	Votes	%	±%
Unionist	William Hutchison	11,025	42.9	−11.9
Communist	Aitken Ferguson	10,021	39.0	n/a
Liberal	Alexander James Grieve	4,662	18.1	−27.1
Majority		1,004	3.9	−5.7
Turnout			68.2	+3.7
Unionist hold		Swing	n/a	
