= Glasgow Kelvingrove =

Parliamentary constituency in the United Kingdom, 1918–1983

- Former burgh constituency for the House of Commons
- Subdivision: County of city of Glasgow; City of Glasgow district

1918–1983
- Seats: One
- Created from: Glasgow College
- Replaced by: Glasgow Maryhill and Glasgow Hillhead

Glasgow Kelvingrove was a burgh constituency represented in the House of Commons of the Parliament of the United Kingdom from 1918 until 1983. It elected one Member of Parliament (MP) using the first-past-the-post voting system. In February 1974 it absorbed the entire Glasgow Woodside Constituency which had existed from 1950 but lost the part of the Exchange Ward it had previously included to Glasgow Central.

== Boundaries ==
1950–1955: The County of the City of Glasgow wards of Anderston and Park.

1955–1974: The County of the City of Glasgow wards of Anderston and Park, and part of Exchange ward.

1974–1983: The County of the City of Glasgow wards of Anderston, Botanic Gardens, Kelvin, Park, Partick East, and Woodside.

== Members of Parliament ==
Election	Member	Party
1918	John MacLeod	Coalition Conservative
1922	William Hutchison	Unionist
1924 by-election	Walter Elliot	Unionist
1945	John Williams	Labour
1950	Walter Elliot	Unionist
1958 by-election	Mary McAlister	Labour
1959	Frank Lilley	Unionist
1964	Maurice Miller	Labour
Feb 1974	Neil Carmichael	Labour
1983	constituency abolished	

== Elections ==
=== Elections in the 1910s ===
General election 1918: Glasgow Kelvingrove
Party		Candidate	Votes	%	±%
C	Unionist	John MacLeod	13,648	64.2	
	Independent Labour	Walter Graham Leachman	5,012	23.6	
	Liberal	George MacPherson	2,582	12.2	
Majority			8,636	40.6	
Turnout			21,242	53.5	
Registered electors			39,702		
	Unionist win (new seat)				
C indicates candidate endorsed by the coalition government.

=== Elections in the 1920s ===
General election 1922: Glasgow Kelvingrove
Party	Candidate	Votes	%	±%
Unionist	William Hutchison	13,442	54.8	−9.4
Liberal	Robert Roxburgh	11,094	45.2	+33.0
Majority		2,348	9.6	−31.0
Turnout		24,536	64.5	+11.0
Registered electors		38,031		
Unionist hold		Swing	−21.2	

General election 1923: Glasgow Kelvingrove
Party	Candidate	Votes	%	±%
Unionist	William Hutchison	11,025	42.9	−11.9
Communist	*Aitken Ferguson	10,021	39.0	New
Liberal	Alexander James Grieve	4,662	18.1	−27.1
Majority		1,004	3.9	−5.7
Turnout		25,708	68.2	+3.7
Registered electors		37,692		
Unionist hold		Swing	+7.6	

* Ferguson labelled himself a Labour party candidate without any official endorsement, despite being an official Communist candidate.

1924 Glasgow Kelvingrove by-election
Party	Candidate	Votes	%	±%
Unionist	Walter Elliot	15,488	55.3	+12.4
Labour	Aitken Ferguson	11,167	39.8	+0.8
Liberal	John Pratt	1,372	4.9	−13.2
Majority		4,321	15.5	+11.6
Turnout		28,027	70.5	+2.3
Registered electors		39,779		
Unionist hold		Swing	+12.8	

General election 1924: Glasgow Kelvingrove
Party	Candidate	Votes	%	±%
Unionist	Walter Elliot	18,034	58.4	+15.5
Labour	Thomas Archibald Kerr	12,844	41.6	N/A
Majority		5,190	16.8	+12.9
Turnout		30,878	77.5	+9.3
Registered electors		39,841		
Unionist hold		Swing		

General election 1929: Glasgow Kelvingrove
Party	Candidate	Votes	%	±%
Unionist	Walter Elliot	17,031	48.9	−9.5
Labour	John Winning	15,173	43.6	+2.0
Liberal	William Reid	2,623	7.5	New
Majority		1,858	5.3	−11.5
Turnout		34,827	74.9	−2.6
Registered electors		46,507		
Unionist hold		Swing	−5.8	

=== Elections in the 1930s ===
General election 1931: Glasgow Kelvingrove
Party	Candidate	Votes	%	±%
Unionist	Walter Elliot	21,481	63.4	+14.5
Ind. Labour Party	John Winning	12,415	36.6	−7.0
Majority		9,066	26.8	+21.5
Turnout		33,896	76.7	+1.8
Unionist hold		Swing		

General election 1935: Glasgow Kelvingrove
Party	Candidate	Votes	%	±%
Unionist	Walter Elliot	15,100	48.7	−14.7
Labour	Hector McNeil	14,951	48.1	N/A
Liberal	Henry George Rae	1,004	3.2	New
Majority		149	0.6	−26.2
Turnout		31,055	72.5	−4.2
Unionist hold		Swing		

General Election 1939–40

Another General Election was required to take place before the end of 1940. The political parties had been making preparations for an election to take place and by the Autumn of 1939, the following candidates had been selected;

- Unionist: Walter Elliot
- Labour:
- Liberal:

=== Elections in the 1940s ===
General election 1945: Glasgow Kelvingrove
Party	Candidate	Votes	%	±%
Labour	John Williams	12,273	46.0	−2.1
Unionist	Walter Elliot	12,185	45.7	−3.0
SNP	Christopher Grieve	1,314	4.9	New
Liberal	Charles John Edwin Morgan	919	3.4	+0.2
Majority		88	0.3	N/A
Turnout		26,691	61.7	−10.8
Labour gain from Unionist		Swing	+0.4	

=== Elections in the 1950s ===
General election 1950: Glasgow Kelvingrove
Party	Candidate	Votes	%	±%
Unionist	Walter Elliot	15,197	49.6	+3.9
Labour	John Williams	13,973	45.6	−0.4
Liberal	Sydney John Ranger	831	2.7	−0.7
Independent Nationalist	Christopher Grieve	639	2.1	−2.8
Majority		1,224	4.0	N/A
Turnout		30,640		
Unionist gain from Labour		Swing		

General election 1951: Glasgow Kelvingrove
Party	Candidate	Votes	%	±%
Unionist	Walter Elliot	15,837	52.4	+2.8
Labour	John Williams	14,406	47.6	+2.0
Majority		1,431	4.8	+0.8
Turnout		30,243		
Unionist hold		Swing		

General election 1955: Glasgow Kelvingrove
Party	Candidate	Votes	%	±%
Unionist	Walter Elliot	14,854	55.4	+3.0
Labour	John Williams	11,966	44.6	−3.0
Majority		2,888	10.8	+6.0
Turnout		26,820		
Unionist hold		Swing		

1958 Glasgow Kelvingrove by-election
Party	Candidate	Votes	%	±%
Labour	Mary McAlister	10,210	48.00	+3.38
Unionist	Katharine Elliot	8,850	41.61	−13.77
Independent Liberal	David Murray	1,622	7.63	New
Ind. Labour Party	William C Park	587	2.76	N/A
Majority		1,360	6.39	N/A
Turnout		21,269		
Labour gain from Unionist		Swing	+8.67	

General election 1959: Glasgow Kelvingrove
Party	Candidate	Votes	%	±%
Unionist	Frank Lilley	12,355	50.7	−4.7
Labour	Mary McAlister	11,254	46.2	+1.6
Ind. Labour Party	William C Park	740	3.0	N/A
Majority		1,101	4.5	−6.3
Turnout		24,349		
Unionist hold		Swing		

=== Elections in the 1960s ===
General election 1964: Glasgow Kelvingrove
Party	Candidate	Votes	%	±%
Labour	Maurice Miller	10,340	54.1	+7.9
Unionist	Frank Lilley	8,791	45.9	−4.8
Majority		1,549	8.2	N/A
Turnout		19,131		
Labour gain from Unionist		Swing		

General election 1966: Glasgow Kelvingrove
Party	Candidate	Votes	%	±%
Labour	Maurice Miller	9,311	57.8	+3.7
Conservative	Frank Lilley	6,793	42.2	−3.7
Majority		2,518	15.6	+7.4
Turnout		16,104		
Labour hold		Swing		

=== Elections in the 1970s ===
General election 1970: Glasgow Kelvingrove
Party	Candidate	Votes	%	±%
Labour	Maurice Miller	6,106	53.7	−4.1
Conservative	Ronald E Dundas	5,274	46.3	+4.1
Majority		832	7.4	−8.2
Turnout		11,380		
Labour hold		Swing		

General election February 1974: Glasgow Kelvingrove
Party	Candidate	Votes	%	±%
Labour	Neil Carmichael	13,115	44.5	−9.2
Conservative	Tom Kenyon	10,717	36.3	−10.0
SNP	Colin M MacKellar	5,666	19.2	New
Majority		2,398	8.2	+0.8
Turnout		29,498		
Labour hold		Swing		

General election October 1974: Glasgow Kelvingrove
Party	Candidate	Votes	%	±%
Labour	Neil Carmichael	11,567	42.8	−1.7
Conservative	J Rennie	7,448	27.6	−8.7
SNP	Charles Duncan Calman	6,274	23.2	+4.0
Liberal	S Glasgow	1,735	6.4	New
Majority		4,119	15.2	+7.0
Turnout		27,024		
Labour hold		Swing		

General election 1979: Glasgow Kelvingrove
Party	Candidate	Votes	%	±%
Labour	Neil Carmichael	11,133	50.33	
Conservative	ACS MacDougall	6,374	28.82	
Liberal	Eric Bennett	2,412	10.91	
SNP	Ian O Bayne	2,199	9.94	
Majority		4,759	21.51	
Turnout		22,118	65.63	
Labour hold		Swing		
