= Frank Lilley =

Member of Parliament for Glasgow Kelvingrove
- In office 8 October 1959 – 25 September 1964
- Preceded by: Mary McAlister
- Succeeded by: Maurice Miller

Personal details
- Born: 24 July 1907
- Died: 21 August 1971 (aged 64)
- Party: Unionist Party

Francis James Patrick Lilley (24 July 1907 – 21 August 1971) was a British civil engineering company chairman and politician.

== Military service ==
Lilley was the son of Francis John Charles Lilley (1883-1939), who had founded F. J. C. Lilley Ltd, a Glasgow-based civil engineering company, and his wife, Janet Stirling Watson (1888-1972).

He was educated at Bellahouston Academy, and worked for the family firm before joining the Argyll and Sutherland Highlanders in 1934. However, he left the regiment in 1940 to return to Glasgow, where he joined the 12th Battalion of the City of Glasgow Home Guard on its establishment in 1941; he was promoted to Lieutenant-Colonel in 1942.

== Politics ==
Following the war Lilley became Managing Director of F. J. C. Lilley Ltd, who won several contracts of major importance. He was elected to Glasgow Corporation in 1957, and in 1959 was selected as the Conservative-allied Unionist Party candidate to try to win back the Glasgow Kelvingrove constituency which the party had lost at a byelection. He was narrowly successful in the general election of that year.

== Parliament ==
On 9 November 1959, Lilley was one of four Scottish MPs on a British European Airways Viscount which was involved in a near miss with a Royal Air Force Pembroke transport. William Baxter, one of the others, said that he "got quite a fright". In 1960, he was made parliamentary private secretary to Richard Wood, then the Minister of Power and later Minister of Pensions and National Insurance.

== Later life ==
Lilley lost his marginal seat at the 1964 general election, and returned to business. He gave up as Managing Director of F. J. C. Lilley Ltd in March 1969 but stayed on as chairman until his death.

Parliament of the United Kingdom
Preceded by Mary McAlister	Member of Parliament for Glasgow Kelvingrove; 1959–1964	Succeeded by Dr Maurice Miller
