= Mary McAlister =

British politician (1896–1976)

Mary McAlister OBE

Member of Parliament for Glasgow Kelvingrove
- In office 13 March 1958 – 7 October 1959
- Prime Minister: Harold Macmillan
- Preceded by: Walter Elliot
- Succeeded by: Frank Lilley

Personal details
- Born: Mary Agnes McMackin; 26 April 1896 Rathmullan, County Donegal, Ireland
- Died: 26 February 1976 (aged 79)
- Party: Labour
- Spouse: J. Alexander McAlister (m. 1927)
- Children: Four daughters, Winifred, Molly, Elinor and Sheila

Mary Agnes McAlister CBE (née McMackin; 26 April 1896 – 26 February 1976) was an Irish-born Scottish nurse who went into politics becoming the first nurse to be elected a Member of Parliament.

== Family ==
McMackin was born in Rathmullan, County Donegal, Ireland; in later life she never revealed her date of birth in public, but the public record indicates that she was born on 26 April 1896 and baptised the same day. She was the eldest child of Charles McMackin, publican, of Rathmullan, son of Joseph McMackin, described as "merchant", and Winnifred Deeny, national teacher, of Glenvar, the eldest child of Charles Deeny, originally from Inniskil, and Sarah McGinley, originally from Legboy, Fanad, both also teachers. She moved with her family to Glasgow in 1903, and attended the Franciscan Convent School there.

From 1923 to 1926, she trained as a fever nurse at the Knightswood Hospital in Glasgow, becoming a registered nurse in 1926. Having qualified, she married J. Alexander McAlister in 1927; they had four daughters (Winifred, Molly, Elinor and Sheila), and six grandchildren (Frances, Susan, Sheila and Jane and Andrew and Judy).

== Municipal politics ==
McAlister maintained her nurse registration and career until at least 1950. During the Second World War, McAlister served initially in the Civil Nursing Reserve. But by the end of the war she was working briefly as a Postal Censor.

At the end of the war she went into politics with the Labour Party, being elected to Glasgow Corporation for Anderston Ward in 1945. In 1947 she was made a Justice of the Peace for Glasgow, and served on the bench for four years. From 1952-1955 McAlister was co-opted to be Convenor of the Health and Welfare Committee and served as a member of the Education Committee.

As the Chair of the Health Committee of Glasgow Corporation she served on the Central Midwives Board for Scotland from 1953 and on the General Nursing Council from 1954. She also served on the Western Region Hospitals Board. She was elected President of the Royal College of Nursing (Glasgow Branch) from 1956.

By the time McAlister stood for parliament she had been a member of the Labour Party for 20 years, a member of Glasgow Corporation for 13 years, and a magistrate for a three-year period of office.

== Kelvingrove by-election ==
When Walter Elliot, the long-serving and well-regarded Unionist Member of Parliament for Glasgow Kelvingrove, died in January 1958, McAlister was chosen as the Labour Party candidate for the ensuing by-election.

In an unusual contest between two women, the Unionists adopted Walter Elliot's widow Katharine as their candidate. McAlister declared that the centrepiece of her campaign was opposing the Government's Rent Act, which had allowed many landlords in the constituency to raise rents; the constituency had a large number of private rented homes. The by-election was one of the first to be televised, as Scottish Television (which had launched the previous year) was anxious to make a reputation for covering issues. On 6 March the candidates were invited to the studios for a televised debate, in which McAlister criticised Mrs Elliot's defence of a report on the Scots economy "with a delightful shaft in the Scots patois". McAlister's concentration on rents and the economy. contrasted with the candidate of the further left Independent Labour Party, William Park, who spoke almost solely about international disarmament.

== Parliament ==
McAlister won the seat by 1,360 votes, although on polling day the Labour agent complained that one woman helping their campaign was threatened with eviction by her landlord unless she stopped the use of her rented home as committee rooms for one polling station.

On 17 April 1958, McAlister made her maiden speech opposing the Rent Act. She was appointed by the Secretary of State to the Standing, Advisory Committee on Local Authorities. She was not a frequent speaker in Parliament, concentrating on constituency problems; during debate on the 1959 budget, she called for lowering of purchase tax on bedding and furnishings rather than refrigerators and washing machines.

== Defeat ==
Dame Katharine Elliot had been given a life peerage in 1958 and so at the 1959 general election, a new Unionist candidate was chosen. Frank Lilley proved an able campaigner and The Times correspondent noted "subtle undercurrents of religion" in the constituency. Lilley ended up winning the seat by 1,101 votes.

In December 1960, McAlister was appointed to the National Assistance Board, serving from 1961 to 1966. She was a member of the Supplementary Benefits Commission from 1966 to 1968, finishing as Deputy chairman; that year she was awarded the CBE.

== References and sources ==
Notes

Sources

- M. Stenton and S. Lees, "Who's Who of British MPs" Vol. IV (Harvester Press, 1981)
- "Who Was Who", A & C Black

Parliament of the United Kingdom
Preceded by Walter Elliot	Member of Parliament for Glasgow Kelvingrove; 1958–1959	Succeeded by Frank Lilley
