= Stephen Mitchell (British politician) =

Scottish Unionist politician

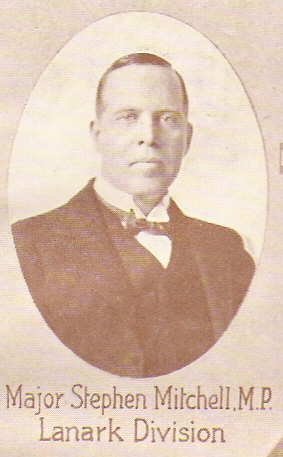
Stephen Mitchell

Stephen Mitchell (10 March 1884 – 7 June 1951) was a Scottish Unionist politician who sought change through unity.

Educated at Loretto School and Jesus College, Cambridge, he served as a Major with the Fife and Forfar Yeomanry, including service in World War I. He was a Director of Imperial Tobacco.

Mitchell was Unionist Member of Parliament (MP) for Lanark from 1924 until 1929. Mitchell also was a Member of the Royal Company of Archers and was High Sheriff of Gloucestershire in 1945–1946.

Parliament of the United Kingdom
Preceded by Thomas Scott Dickson	Member of Parliament for Lanark; 1924–1929	Succeeded by Thomas Scott Dickson
