= Adam Ingram (Labour politician) =

British Labour Party politician (born 1947)

The Right Honourable Sir Adam Ingram

Minister of State for the Armed Forces
- In office 7 June 2001 – 29 June 2007
- Prime Minister: Tony Blair
- Preceded by: John Spellar
- Succeeded by: Bob Ainsworth

Minister of State for Northern Ireland
- In office 2 May 1997 – 7 June 2001
- Prime Minister: Tony Blair
- Preceded by: Michael Ancram
- Succeeded by: Jane Kennedy

Parliamentary Private Secretary to the Leader of the Opposition
- In office 11 November 1988 – 18 July 1992
- Leader: Neil Kinnock
- Preceded by: Kevin Barron
- Succeeded by: Hilary Armstrong

Member of Parliament for East Kilbride, Strathaven and Lesmahagow East Kilbride (1987–2005)
- In office 11 June 1987 – 12 April 2010
- Preceded by: Maurice Miller
- Succeeded by: Michael McCann

Personal details
- Born: 1 February 1947 (age 79) Glasgow, Scotland
- Party: Labour
- Education: Open University

Sir Adam Paterson Ingram (born 1 February 1947) is a retired British Labour Party politician. He was the Member of Parliament (MP) for East Kilbride, then East Kilbride, Strathaven and Lesmahagow, from 1987 to 2010.

== Early life ==
Ingram attended Cranhill Senior Secondary School in Cranhill, Glasgow, a year below Archy Kirkwood, Baron Kirkwood of Kirkhope and is a graduate of the Open University. He became a trade union official with NALGO from 1977 to 1987 after several years working as a computer programmer/analyst from 1967 to 1977. A Justice of the Peace and former chairman of East Kilbride Constituency Labour Party, Ingram was an East Kilbride District Councillor from 1980 to 1987 and leader of the District Council from 1984 to 1987.

== Parliamentary career ==
Ingram was the Labour candidate for Strathkelvin and Bearsden in 1983. After coming third in a contest won by Michael Hirst of the Conservatives, he entered the Commons following the 1987 election and during this parliamentary term acted as Parliamentary Private Secretary to Neil Kinnock. After Labour's landslide election victory in 1997, Prime Minister Tony Blair appointed him as Minister of State at the Northern Ireland Office with responsibilities including Security.

In 2001 he became Armed Forces Minister at the Ministry of Defence, a position he held until Gordon Brown became Prime Minister in 2007. He was the longest serving Defence Minister in British history and is a member of the Privy Council.

On 27 March 2009, Ingram announced that he would stand down at the next general election.

== Controversies ==
Ingram applied for an interim interdict to prevent the publication of Labour turned Respect politician George Galloway's book I'm Not the Only One (2004). Galloway wrote that Ingram "played the flute in a sectarian, anti-Catholic, Protestant-supremacist Orange Order band". Ingram opinied that this was in bad faith and defamatory, although Ingram's lawyers conceded that for a year as a teenager he had been a member of a junior Orange Lodge in Barlanark, Glasgow, and had attended three parades. The Judge, Lord Kingarth, decided to refuse an interim interdict, that the balance of the arguments favoured Galloway's publisher, and that the phrase "sectarian, anti-Catholic, Protestant-supremacist" was fair comment on that organisation. Although Ingram was not and never had been a flute-player, the defending advocate observed that "playing the flute carries no obvious defamatory imputation ... it is not to the discredit of anyone that he plays the flute." The judge ruled that Ingram should pay the full court costs of the hearing.

In 2009 Ingram declared outside earnings of £170,000, the most of any Scottish MP. In the same year it was shown that letters in the local press defending these earnings were forged.

In June 2010 at the public inquiry into the beating to death of Baha Mousa in custody he conceded that he had misled MPs when he was Armed Forces Minister over British troops' hooding of Iraqi prisoners. He had assured the then head of the Parliamentary joint committee on human rights, Jean Corston in June 2004, that prisoners were only hooded during transportation but had received documents in September 2003 that showed that Mousa had been hooded, on the advice of interrogation experts for nearly 24 of the 36 hours that he spent in custody.

In December 2010 he was cleared of any wrongdoing by the Standards and Privileges Committee after the Cash for Influence Scandal, but criticised for bad judgement.

== Personal life ==
Ingram married Maureen McMahon in 1970.

Ingram was knighted in the 2026 New Year Honours for 'Parliamentary and Political Service'.

== In popular culture ==
Ingram was a prominent character in the 2010 Mo Mowlam biopic Mo, in which Gary Lewis portrayed him. Ingram called the film "powerful to watch", adding that it "brought home the essence of Mo" and that the film had moved him to tears.

Parliament of the United Kingdom
Preceded by Maurice Miller	Member of Parliament for East Kilbride; 1987 – 2005	Constituency abolished
New constituency	Member of Parliament for East Kilbride, Strathaven and Lesmahagow; 2005 – 2010	Succeeded by Michael McCann
Political offices
Preceded by John Spellar	Minister of State for the Armed Forces; 2001–2007	Succeeded by Bob Ainsworth
