= Katharine Elliot, Baroness Elliot of Harwood =

British baroness (1903–1994)

The Right Honourable The Baroness Elliot of Harwood DBE

Member of the House of Lords
- Lord Temporal
- Life peerage 26 September 1958 – 3 January 1994

Personal details
- Born: Katharine Tennant; 15 January 1903 Mayfair, London, England
- Died: 3 January 1994 (aged 90) Hawick, Roxburghshire, Scotland
- Party: Conservative (Unionist until 1965)
- Spouse: Walter Elliot (m. 1934; died 1958)
- Parent(s): Sir Charles Tennant, 1st Baronet; Marguerite Miles
- Occupation: Politician

Katharine Elliot, Baroness Elliot of Harwood, DBE (née Tennant; 15 January 1903 – 3 January 1994) was a British public servant and politician.

== Early life ==
Born Katharine Tennant in 1903, she was the daughter of the Scottish industrialist and politician, Sir Charles Tennant, Bt. (then seventy-nine years old) and his second wife, Marguerite Miles, daughter of Colonel Charles William Miles, MP and was cousin of Sir Philip Miles. As a child, she played in the nursery of 10 Downing Street, the home of her much older half-sister, Margot Asquith, the wife of then Prime Minister H. H. Asquith. Tennant when visiting her sister, threw her teddybear out the window of 10 Downing Street at the protesting Suffragettes.

Tennant was educated at home by governesses, then at Abbot's Hill School and finally in Paris. She was presented at court to George V as a debutante but later stated 'I was more interested in politics than parties' and grew up with strong Liberal ideals. Later studying at the London School of Economics, she was also an accomplished violinist, organist, equestrienne, golfer and fluent in French.

== Marriage ==
On 2 April 1934, Tennant married Walter Elliott, a doctor and Unionist Party MP who was at that time the Minister of Agriculture, Fisheries and Food in the National Government of Ramsay MacDonald. At the height of his career Elliot was probably the most significant Conservative politician of Scotland. She was his second wife; his first had died on their honeymoon fifteen years earlier. Elliot was the son of a livestock auctioneer and she became an expert in trading farm animals and agricultural equipment. Their friends and the local farmers had collected money towards a wedding present, from which she purchased a tractor.

== Politics ==
Elliot then became involved in Conservative affairs, wrote speeches for, and campaigned in elections for, her husband, as well as promoting his enactment of the Milk Marketing Board. Still in touch with her Liberal roots, she favoured prison reform and was an opponent of capital punishment. From 1939 to 1949, Elliot was chair of the National Association of Mixed Clubs and Girls' Clubs (later known as Youth Clubs UK) and she sat on the Home Office advisory committee on the treatment of offenders from 1946 to 1962, during which time she visited every prison in the kingdom. She also served on the advisory committee on child care in Scotland from 1956 to 1965, was chair of the Conservative Women's National Committee from 1954 to 1957 and was chair of the National Union of Conservative and Unionist Associations from 1956 to 1967. She became the first chair of the Consumer Council in 1963. On three occasions, in 1954, 1956 and 1957, she was a member of the UK delegation to the United Nations and in the absence of ministers during the Suez Crisis in 1956, she made a speech denouncing the Soviet invasion of Hungary during the Hungarian Revolution of 1956. She was appointed a Commander of the Order of the British Empire in the 1946 Birthday Honours, awarded the Grand Silver Cross of the Order of Merit of Austria in 1963.

In a 1958 episode of the BBC television programme The Brains Trust she described herself as an "unrepentant defender of votes for women".

Following the death of her husband in 1958, Elliot took over from him as chair of the family auctioneering firm and stood in his place as parliamentary candidate of Glasgow Kelvingrove, but lost by a narrow margin of votes to the Labour candidate Mary McAlister in the 1958 Glasgow Kelvingrove by-election.

== House of Lords ==
In the 1958 Birthday Honours, Elliot was promoted as a Dame Commander of the Order of the British Empire and in September of that year was created Baroness Elliot of Harwood, of Rulewater in the County of Roxburgh. As one of the initial four women who were created peers under the Life Peerages Act 1958, she was the first peeress to speak in the House of Lords, the first peeress to propose the loyal address and the first peeress to pass a private bill through the House (which was at the request of Margaret Thatcher from the House of Commons, making the bill the first to be taken through both houses by women).

In 1960 Elliot was made Vice President of the Royal College of Nursing in recognition of her long standing advocacy in Parliament for nurses, in particular district nurses.

== Death ==
At the State Opening of Parliament in November 1993, Elliot tripped over her parliamentary robes and fell as she left the House of Lords. She was taken to hospital and died at Hawick Cottage Hospital near her Scottish home of Harwood, on 3 January 1994, aged ninety. She was buried at Hobkirk parish church on 8 January and a service of thanksgiving was held in her memory at the Church of St. Margaret, Westminster, on 14 April.

== Arms ==
Coat of arms of Katharine Elliot, Baroness Elliot of Harwood
Coronet A Coronet of a Baroness Escutcheon Two coats per pale, dexter Gules on a bend Or between a holly leaf Proper in chief and a portcullis in base of the second a baton Azure (Elliot), sinister Argent two crescents in fess and a lymphad in the base Sable on a chief Gules a boar's head couped of the first within a bordure company of the second and first (Tennant). Supporters Dexter a Black-faced ram Proper horned Gules gorged of a collar Argent charged with two crescents Sable, sinister a horse Argent hooves, bridle and reins Sable. Motto Velis Plenis (Under Full Sail)

Arms of Sir Charles Tennant, 1st Baronet, granted in 1885.

Elliot's father had received arms from Lord Lyon in 1885. Katharine bore these and impaled them with arms posthumously granted at her behest in 1962 to her late husband and to other descendants of his grandfather.

Arms of Walter Elliot, granted posthumously 1962.

Her motto ‘Velis plenis’ (‘With full sails’) alludes to her father’s crest of a sail and the family motto, ‘God fills my sails’. The wand azure was a charge used by many Elliots, the holly leaf represented the Elliots of Hollybush near Galashiels (his branch of the family), and the portcullis signifies his forty-year parliamentary career. She was granted her own supporters, a black-faced ram Proper horned Gules, and a horse Argent, symbolising her love of rural life.
