= 1924 Glasgow Kelvingrove by-election =

The 1924 Glasgow Kelvingrove by-election was held on Friday, 23 May 1924. The by-election was held due to the death of the incumbent Conservative MP, William Hutchison. It was won by the Conservative candidate Walter Elliot.

== Background ==
Glasgow Kelvingrove had been held by the Unionist Party (as the Conservatives stood at elections in Scotland under that name) since 1918. However at the 1923 general election, the Unionist majority had been cut to just over 1,000 votes, by far the closest result in the seat up to that point. The Unionists selected Walter Elliot, who had lost his seat at the 1923 general election, and had previously been Under Secretary of Health for Scotland in the last Conservative Government.

The Labour candidate was Aitken Ferguson who had stood as Labour candidate at the previous election. However, Ferguson, who was a member of the Communist Party of Great Britain and was their official candidate; was not officially endorsed by the Labour Party in that contest. He was endorsed by the National Executive Committee of the Labour Party as its candidate for the by-election. However, according to F. W. S. Craig the Labour Party's annual Conference Report for 1924 recorded that owing to "developments during the campaign it had been found impossible to render further support."

== Result ==
1924 Glasgow Kelvingrove by-election
Party	Candidate	Votes	%	±%
Unionist	Walter Elliot	15,488	55.3	+12.4
Labour	Aitken Ferguson	11,167	39.8	+0.8
Liberal	John Pratt	1,372	4.9	−13.2
Majority		4,321	15.5	+11.6
Turnout		28,027	70.5	+2.3
Registered electors		39,779		
Unionist hold		Swing	+12.8	
