= Maurice Miller =

British politician

Member of Parliament for East Kilbride
- In office 28 February 1974 – 18 May 1987
- Preceded by: Constituency established
- Succeeded by: Adam Ingram

Member of Parliament for Glasgow Kelvingrove
- In office 15 October 1964 – 8 February 1974
- Preceded by: Frank Lilley
- Succeeded by: Neil Carmichael

Personal details
- Born: Maurice Solomon Miller; 16 August 1920
- Died: 30 October 2001 (aged 81)

Maurice Solomon Miller (16 August 1920 – 30 October 2001) was a British Labour Party politician who was Member of Parliament (MP) for Glasgow Kelvingrove from 1964 to 1974 and for East Kilbride from 1974 to 1987.

Raised in Glasgow, Miller was educated at Shawlands Academy before going on to study at the University of Glasgow. He became a medical practitioner and a councillor on Glasgow Corporation from 1950. He was Bailie 1954 to 1957.

Elected at the 1964 general election, Miller was a government whip from 1968 to 1969. He stood down as MP for Glasgow Kelvingrove at the February 1974 general election and instead stood successfully for East Kilbride at the election. He was the chair of Poale Zion's Scottish branch in the 1980s. He retired at the 1987 general election.

Parliament of the United Kingdom
Preceded by Frank Lilley	Member of Parliament for Glasgow Kelvingrove; 1964–Feb 1974	Succeeded by Neil Carmichael
New constituency	Member of Parliament for East Kilbride; Feb 1974–1987	Succeeded by Adam Ingram
