= David Murray (Scottish politician) =

Scottish nationalist and Liberal Party politician

David Murray (born 1900, date of death unknown), was a Scottish nationalist and Liberal Party politician.

== Background ==
Murray was educated at Glasgow University, where he took a Bachelor of Science in engineering.

== Professional career ==
Murray studied steelmaking in Germany. He was an engineer in Australia. He was a steel salesman in the United States and South America. He became an industrial journalist and author. In 1960 he published The first nation in Europe: a portrait of Scotland and the Scots. In 1962, he published Ecurie Ecosse: the story of Scotland's international racing team.

== Political career ==
Murray was an early advocate of Scottish home rule. He was a member of the committee of the Scottish Covenant Association, and took part in the launching of the Scottish Covenant. He was an independent Scottish Home Rule candidate for the Western Isles division at the 1950 general election, having unsuccessfully sought endorsement from the Scottish Liberal Party. He finished a poor third. At the 1951 general election, he stood in the Western Isles after being endorsed as the Liberal candidate, but then had to compete for the nationalist vote when a Scottish National Party candidate intervened. Murray finished third. He remained active for the Liberal Party on the Western Isles, but the local association decided not to run a candidate at the 1955 general election. He decided to contest the 1958 Glasgow Kelvingrove by-election and stood as an Independent Liberal candidate. He finished third, but in the wake of this defeat, an alliance was formed to co-operate in promoting Scottish self-government. Murray was an Independent candidate for the Motherwell division at the 1959 general election, finishing a poor third. He did not stand for parliament again.

Collections of his papers are held in the National Library of Scotland.
