= Walter Elliot (Scottish politician) =

Scottish politician

Colonel The Right Honourable Walter Elliot CH MC FRS FRSE FRCP
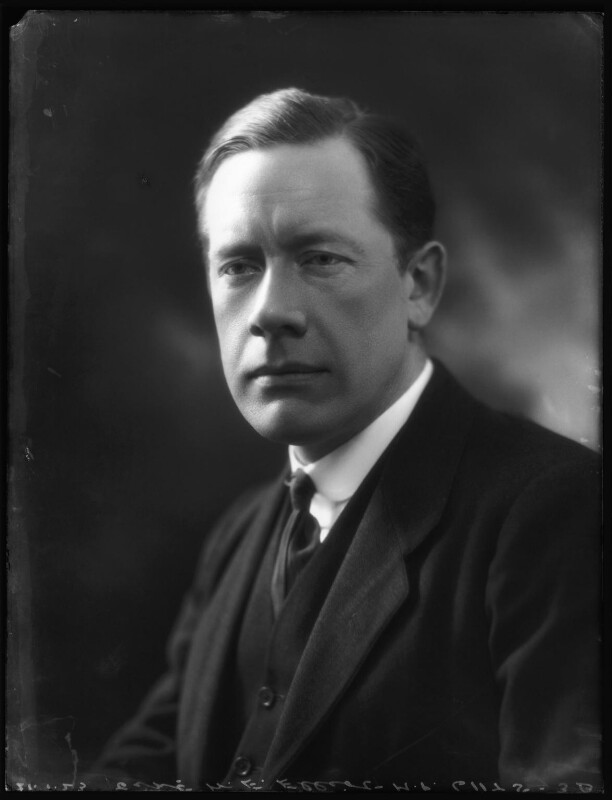
- Eliot in 1923

Minister of Health
- In office 16 May 1938 – 13 May 1940
- Prime Minister: Neville Chamberlain; Winston Churchill
- Preceded by: Sir Kingsley Wood
- Succeeded by: Malcolm MacDonald

Secretary of State for Scotland
- In office 29 October 1936 – 6 May 1938
- Prime Minister: Stanley Baldwin; Neville Chamberlain
- Preceded by: Sir Godfrey Collins
- Succeeded by: John Colville

Minister of Agriculture, Fisheries and Food
- In office 28 September 1932 – 29 October 1936
- Prime Minister: Ramsay MacDonald; Stanley Baldwin
- Preceded by: Sir John Gilmour
- Succeeded by: William Morrison

Financial Secretary to the Treasury
- In office 24 August 1931 – 29 September 1932
- Prime Minister: Ramsay MacDonald
- Preceded by: Frederick Pethick-Lawrence
- Succeeded by: Leslie Hore-Belisha

Parliamentary Under-Secretary of State for Scotland
- In office 26 July 1926 – 7 June 1929
- Prime Minister: Stanley Baldwin
- Preceded by: Office established
- Succeeded by: Tim Johnston

Parliamentary Under-Secretary for Health for Scotland
- In office 11 November 1924 – 26 July 1926
- Prime Minister: Stanley Baldwin
- Preceded by: James Stewart
- Succeeded by: Office renamed
- In office 15 January 1923 – 23 January 1924
- Prime Minister: Stanley Baldwin
- Preceded by: James Kidd
- Succeeded by: James Stewart

Personal details
- Born: 19 September 1888 Lanark, Lanarkshire, Scotland
- Died: 8 January 1958 (aged 69) Bonchester Bridge, Roxburghshire, Scotland
- Party: Unionist
- Other political affiliations: Conservative
- Spouses: Helen Hamilton (m. 1919; died 1919) Katharine Tennant (m. 1934)
- Education: University of Glasgow; MB ChB 1913; DSc 1923
- Military career
- Allegiance: United Kingdom
- Branch: British Army
- Service years: 1914–1941
- Rank: Colonel
- Units: Royal Army Medical Corps; Royal Scots Greys
- Conflicts: First World War; Western front; Second Battle of Arras; First Battle of Cambrai
- Awards: Military Cross and bar

Walter Elliot Elliot (19 September 1888 – 8 January 1958) was a politician of Scotland's Unionist Party prominent in the interwar period. He was elected to the House of Commons in 1918, and besides an interval of months in 1923–24 and 1945–46, remained in parliament until his death. His Cabinet roles were as the Minister of Agriculture, Fisheries and Food in the National Government (1931–1935) of Ramsay MacDonald; as the Secretary of State for Scotland in the National Government (1935–1937) of Stanley Baldwin; and as Minister of Health in Neville Chamberlain's National Government (1937–1939) and the short-lived Chamberlain war ministry.

While in medical training at university he was President of the Glasgow University Union and served in the First World War, winning the Military Cross on two occasions. In the course of his career he was Member of Parliament for the constituencies of Lanark, Glasgow Kelvingrove, and Combined Scottish Universities. He was also Lord High Commissioner to the General Assembly of the Church of Scotland, Rector of the University of Aberdeen, and Rector of the University of Glasgow.

== Early life ==
He was born in Lanark the eldest son of William Elliot, of the livestock auctioneers' firm Lawrie and Symington, and his wife, Ellen Elizabeth Shiels. His mother died during the birth of his youngest sibling. The children were thereafter raised by the mother's relatives in Glasgow. They appear to have had a company, Shiels, Elliot and Nelson, who made farming equipment including the Shiels patent milking machine. Elliot was raised in Glasgow and educated at the high school in Lanark and The Glasgow Academy. One of his friends from the academy, through university and beyond, was the playwright Osborne Henry Mavor.

From 1905 he studied science and medicine at the University of Glasgow. In the election for Rector of the University of Glasgow in 1908, Elliot assisted the Liberal Club campaign to elect the Liberal David Lloyd George, supported the candidacy of George Curzon, 1st Marquess Curzon of Kedleston, and according to Henry Mavor, ultimately voted for Keir Hardie, founder of the Labour Party. In 1909–10 he was editor of the Glasgow University Magazine. He co-wrote the university song "Ygorra". Elliot graduated BSc in 1910. As a postgraduate he was President of the Glasgow University Union, 1911–12. While in the British Army's Glasgow University Officers' Training Corps, he befriended John Boyd Orr. He graduated MB ChB in 1913.

In 1913–14 he was houseman (a newly qualified doctor) at the Glasgow Royal Infirmary.

== First World War ==
At the onset of the First World War the Special Reserve of the Royal Army Medical Corps was mobilised and in December 1914 Elliot was attached as a medical officer to the Royal Scots Greys on the Western Front. He won a Military Cross for his actions at Wancourt during the Battle of Arras in April 1917. He won a second Military Cross in the Battle of Cambrai in November 1917, adding a bar to the original medal. Walter received a leg wound in the final month of the war, but returned home safely. His younger brother Dan Elliot was killed in 1915, during the Gallipoli campaign.

After the war, Elliot refused his father's urging to enter the family business, Lawrie and Symington, and instead began a political career after being asked to stand for election while recovering from his war-wound. The invitation came from the governing Lloyd George ministry, a coalition government of the Liberal Party with the Conservative Party and their allies the Unionist Party. Elliot was indifferent to party-political divisions, and was reputed to have agreed to stand before asking which party's ticket he should stand for.

== Member of Parliament ==
Elliot then entered politics and was elected as Member of Parliament (MP) for Lanark in the 1918 general election, standing as a Unionist. In 1919 he was appointed parliamentary private secretary to the Liberal Parliamentary Under-Secretary for Health for Scotland, John Pratt. During his first stint in parliament he shared a house in Westminster with Liberal MP Colin Coote, who was later to write a biography of Elliot. In the same period Elliot met Blanche "Baffy" Dugdale niece and biographer of Arthur Balfour, whose Zionism Elliot came to support. Elliot also undertook scientific research during parliamentary recesses; his friend John Boyd Orr invited him to work at the Rowett Research Institute. In the Commons, Elliot supported the Government of Ireland Act 1920, which established the Partition of Ireland into Northern Ireland and Southern Ireland as an attempt at Home Rule. At the pivotal Carlton Club meeting on 19 October 1922, he supported the Conservative Party's ongoing coalition government of the Lloyd George ministry, but the Party favoured ending its involvement.

From Elliot's research emerged a doctoral thesis on nutrition in pigs submitted to the University of Glasgow and for which Elliot was made Doctor of Science in 1923. He lost this seat in the 1923 general election but regained a place in the House of Commons months later in the 1924 Glasgow Kelvingrove by-election, a seat he held until July 1945.

== Junior Minister ==
In January 1923 Elliot was appointed Parliamentary Under-Secretary for Health for Scotland in the government of Stanley Baldwin. He briefly lost the post during the Labour Party's 1924 first MacDonald ministry, but regained it after Baldwin's return to power that same year. In July 1926 Elliot was made to Parliamentary Under-Secretary of State for Scotland, a role he filled until 1929. He made an official visit to Colonial Nigeria in 1927. He was involved in the passage of the Local Government Act 1929, as well as reforms to administration in Scotland in 1928 and changes to Scottish ministers' positions in 1926.

In 1924 he was elected a Fellow of the Royal Society of Edinburgh. His proposers were Sir Robert Blyth Greig, Frederick Orpen Bower, Arthur Crichton Mitchell, and William Archer Porter Tait.

Elliot was involved in the Empire Marketing Board from October 1927, having been appointed president of the Imperial Research Conference in Westminster Hall. and with John Boyd Orr began a project that conducted experiments in 1927 proving the value of feeding free milk to children in schools, and this persuaded Elliot to extend the pilot scheme to all Scotland's schools by legislation. Elliot was a supporter of the Empire Marketing Board Film Unit and its work on documentary films, particularly those of John Grierson, including Drifters in 1929.

In May 1928, Elliot and Arthur Samuel, the Financial Secretary to the Treasury were reported to be working together in helping the Chancellor of the Exchequer, Winston Churchill in the budget debate.

Following the formation of the first National Government (1931), Elliot was appointed Financial Secretary to the Treasury, a post he retained in the following second National Government (1931–1935). Early in 1932 Elliot was made a Privy Counsellor.

== Cabinet Minister ==
Political dispute over the British Empire Economic Conference held in Ottawa in summer 1932 – in which the British Dominions' governments discussed solutions to the Great Depression – eventually caused the replacement of the then Home Secretary Herbert Samuel with Sir John Gilmour, 2nd Baronet. In the same cabinet reshuffle, it was generally anticipated that Elliot would be appointed Secretary of State for Scotland, including by Elliot himself and by the permanent secretary at the Ministry of Agriculture, Fisheries and Food, but unexpectedly Elliot was appointed to replace Gilmour as Minister of Agriculture, Fisheries and Food while Godfrey Collins became the Scottish Secretary after the departure of Sir Archibald Sinclair, 4th Baronet.

He was seen by many as a rising star. In 1932 he entered the Cabinet as Minister of Agriculture, Fisheries and Food and subsequently served as Secretary of State for Scotland and Minister of Health. Amongst his achievements were the Agricultural Marketing Act which sought to protect food producers from going bankrupt amidst massive surpluses and collapsing prices, the introduction of free milk for school children and formation of the National Housing Company which built prefabricated steel-based "Weir Houses" (produced for industrialist William Weir, 1st Viscount Weir) in Clydeside.

While Minister of Agriculture, Elliot asked John Boyd Orr, who advocated a national food policy, to prepare a report on nutrition and public health, though it went unpublished because of their political ramifications. Orr published the report himself as Food, Health and Income in early 1936, advocating national and international co-ordination on nutrition.

He was elected Rector of the University of Aberdeen in 1933, serving until 1936. Elliot was elected a Fellow of the Royal Society in 1935.

On 29 March 1939, Elliot passed the Cancer Act 1939 – "An Act to make further provision for the treatment of cancer, to authorise the Minister of Health to lend money to the National Radium Trust, to prohibit certain advertisements relating to cancer, and for purposes connected with the matters aforesaid". All provisions in the Act for improving the treatment of cancer nationally have since been stripped, leaving only the prohibition against advertisements relating to cancer treatments.

In 1938 Elliot's career reached a turning point when he came close to resigning over the Munich Agreement but decided against. Consequently, his political stock began to fall and when Winston Churchill replaced Neville Chamberlain as Prime Minister in 1940, Elliot was dropped from the government. He later served as Lord High Commissioner to the General Assembly of the Church of Scotland.

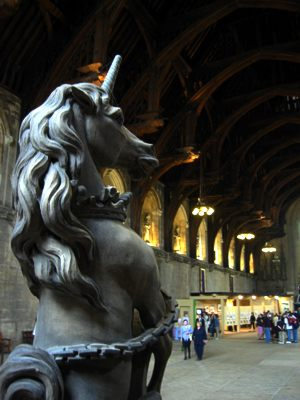
Walter Elliot helped save the Palace of Westminster's great hall during the Blitz.

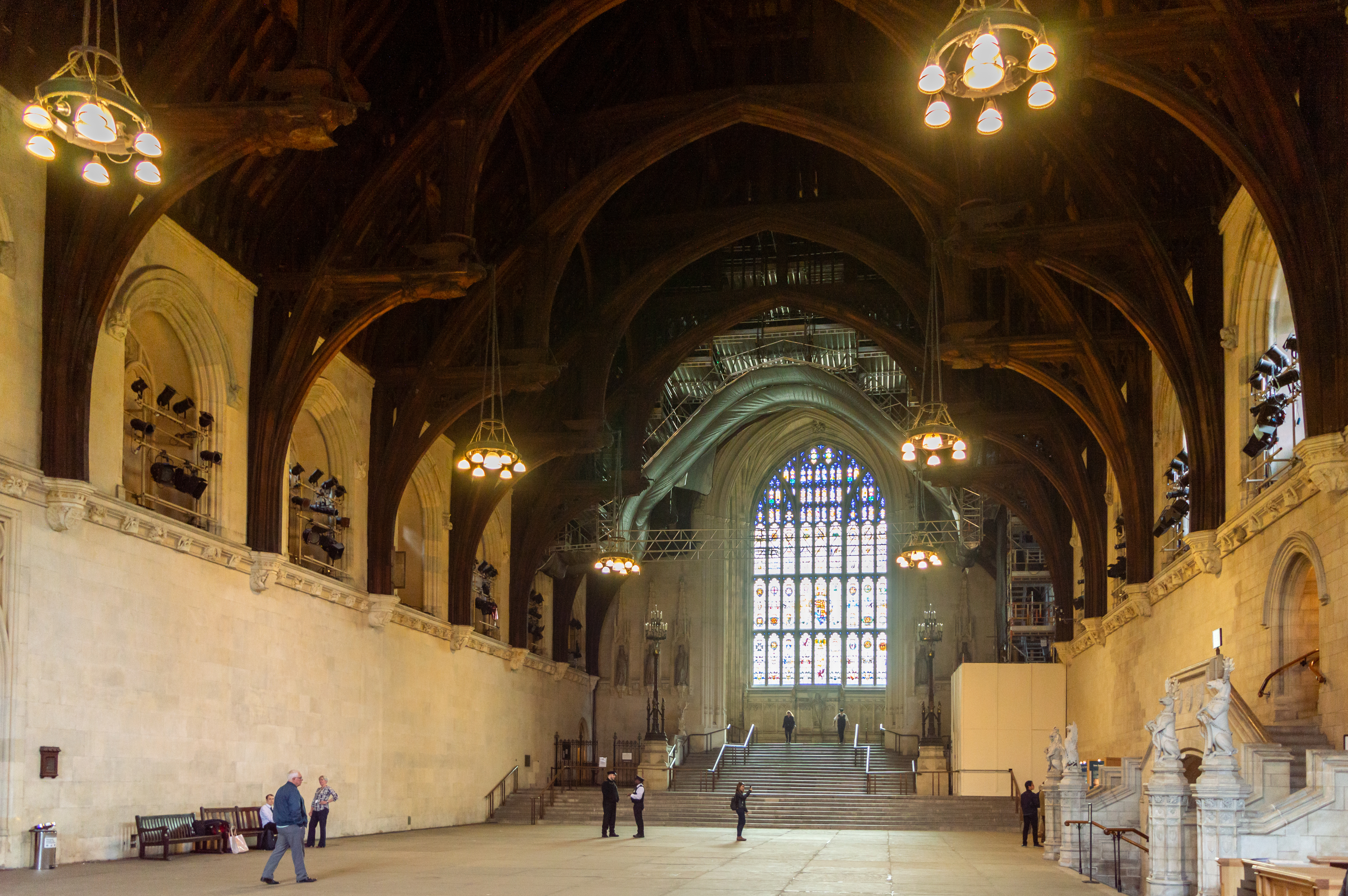
Westminster Hall (built 1097) is the largest remnant of the medieval palace; its roof greater span than any timber roof in England, built by Hugh Herland (begun 1393).

== Second World War ==
Churchill did not include Elliot in the Churchill war ministry during the Second World War; instead, Churchill offered him the post of Governor of British Burma (the "Scottish Colony") in October 1940, which Elliot refused. Since leaving government, Elliot become deputy assistant adjutant-general at Chester. There he dealt with refugees from The Blitz. After refusing the governorship of Burma, in January the following year he accepted the role of director of public relations at the War Office. He also sat on the Scottish Council of State established by Churchill's Secretary of State for Scotland, Tom Johnston, since Elliot was himself a former Scotland Secretary.

In May 1941, during the London Blitz, Elliot chanced to be nearby the Palace of Westminster during a heavy air-raid which damaged the building. In the fire that followed, he was able to direct the London Fire Brigade to focus their efforts on saving the centuries-old Westminster Hall, with its unrivalled medieval hammerbeam roof, rather than on the Victorian Gothic chamber of the House of Commons, which was destroyed. During his time at the War Office, Elliot commissioned war artists in co-operation with Kenneth Clark, the Surveyor of the King's Pictures, director of the National Gallery, and instigator of the War Artists' Advisory Committee. He also commissioned war-work from writers, including Eric Linklater. At the end of the year Elliot left his job at the War Office; he retired from the British Army having been promoted colonel.

He was chair of the Public Accounts Committee, a powerful House of Commons select committee, in 1942. During his chairmanship, he handled an inquiry examining deals between the Marconi Company and the Air Ministry; the investigation ended in the company forfeiting the proceeds.

In the beginning of 1943, Elliot suffered serious injury in an accident at the railway station at Hawick, while boarding a train on the Waverley Route between Edinburgh and Carlisle. He took the rest of 1943 to recover. In this time he was chair of committee on herring fisheries and published a collection of broadcasts he had made the previous year as Long Distance.

In early 1944 Elliot travelled to British West Africa, where he was instrumental in the eventual establishment of universities in the Gold Coast, the Sierra Leone Colony and Protectorate, and British Nigeria. The commission established to deal with higher education in West Africa was chaired by Elliot.

Elliot had a meeting with Joseph Stalin as part of a parliamentary delegation to the Soviet Union, one of the Allies, in spring 1945. In the 1945 general election which brought the Attlee ministry to power, he lost the Glasgow Kelvingrove constituency to Labour's John Williams by just 88 votes.

== Backbencher ==
He was returned for the Combined Scottish Universities seat in the November 1946 Combined Scottish Universities by-election, in which he replaced John Boyd Orr, who had resigned to become Director-General of the United Nations' new Food and Agriculture Organization. (This was the last such election.) When the university seats were abolished, Elliot returned to Kelvingrove where he beat his Labour opponent from 1945, John Lloyd Williams, and SNP candidate Hugh MacDiarmid in the 1950 election.

Between 1947 and 1950, Elliot was the elected Rector of the University of Glasgow. He was a governor of The Peckham Experiment in 1949. The same year, Elliot undertook a journey to the newly established State of Israel to report for The Daily Telegraph. Elliot was a strong supporter of Israel.

In 1954 Elliot led the Parliamentary Delegation of Inquiry into the Mau Mau Uprising in Kenya Colony. He also led the popular Elliot Commission on Higher Education in West Africa whose report informed the creation of the first university colleges in West African countries such as Nigeria and Ghana.

Elliot co-founded the NATO Parliamentary Assembly in 1955, and was its treasurer, often travelling to North America on NATO business. He frequently attended the Königswinter Conference at Königswinter in West Germany, an Anglo-German meeting of parliamentarians held annually from 1950.

Besides his fellowship in the Royal Society and the Royal Society of Edinburgh, Elliot was also fellow of the Royal College of Physicians and the Royal College of Physicians and Surgeons of Glasgow.

Six universities awarded him honorary Legum Doctor (LLD) doctorates, including all the ancient universities of Scotland (Aberdeen, Edinburgh, St Andrews, Glasgow) and the universities of Leeds and Manchester. He received an honorary Doctor of Science (DSc) degree from the University of South Africa. He was made a Member of the Order of the Companions of Honour (CH) in 1952. He was also Lord High Commissioner to the General Assembly of the Church of Scotland 1956–1957.

He regularly appeared on the BBC television programme The Brains Trust and the BBC Home Service's radio programme Any Questions?.

== Family ==
Elliot married Helen Arabella Hamilton (the daughter of David Livingstone Hamilton) on 27 August 1919 at St. Margaret's Church, Westminster. She tragically died on 8 September in a mountaineering accident on their honeymoon on the Isle of Skye's Cuillin hills. He married secondly Katharine Tennant (the daughter of Sir Charles Tennant, 1st Baronet and a half-sister of Margot Asquith) on 2 April 1934.

== Arms ==
Coat of arms of Walter Elliot
| Escutcheon Gules on a bend Or between a holly leaf Proper in chief and a portcullis in base of the second a baton Azure. |

Elliot was posthumously granted arms from Lord Lyon in 1962 at the request of his widow, Katharine Elliot, Baroness Elliot of Harwood. His arms are impaled with the arms of his father-in-law, Sir Charles Tennant, 1st Baronet, in the arms of Katharine Elliot.

== Death ==
He died at the family estate of Harwood (inherited from his father) in Bonchester Bridge on 8 January 1958 of a coronary thrombosis. He was buried in Hobkirk churchyard three days later. On Elliot's death, his widow stood as a Unionist for her husband's former seat of Glasgow Kelvingrove; she was defeated in the 1958 Glasgow Kelvingrove by-election by Labour's Mary McAlister. Afterwards she was instead one of the four women initially created a life peer under the Life Peerages Act 1958. As the Baroness Elliot of Harwood, she was the first woman to speak in the modern House of Lords.

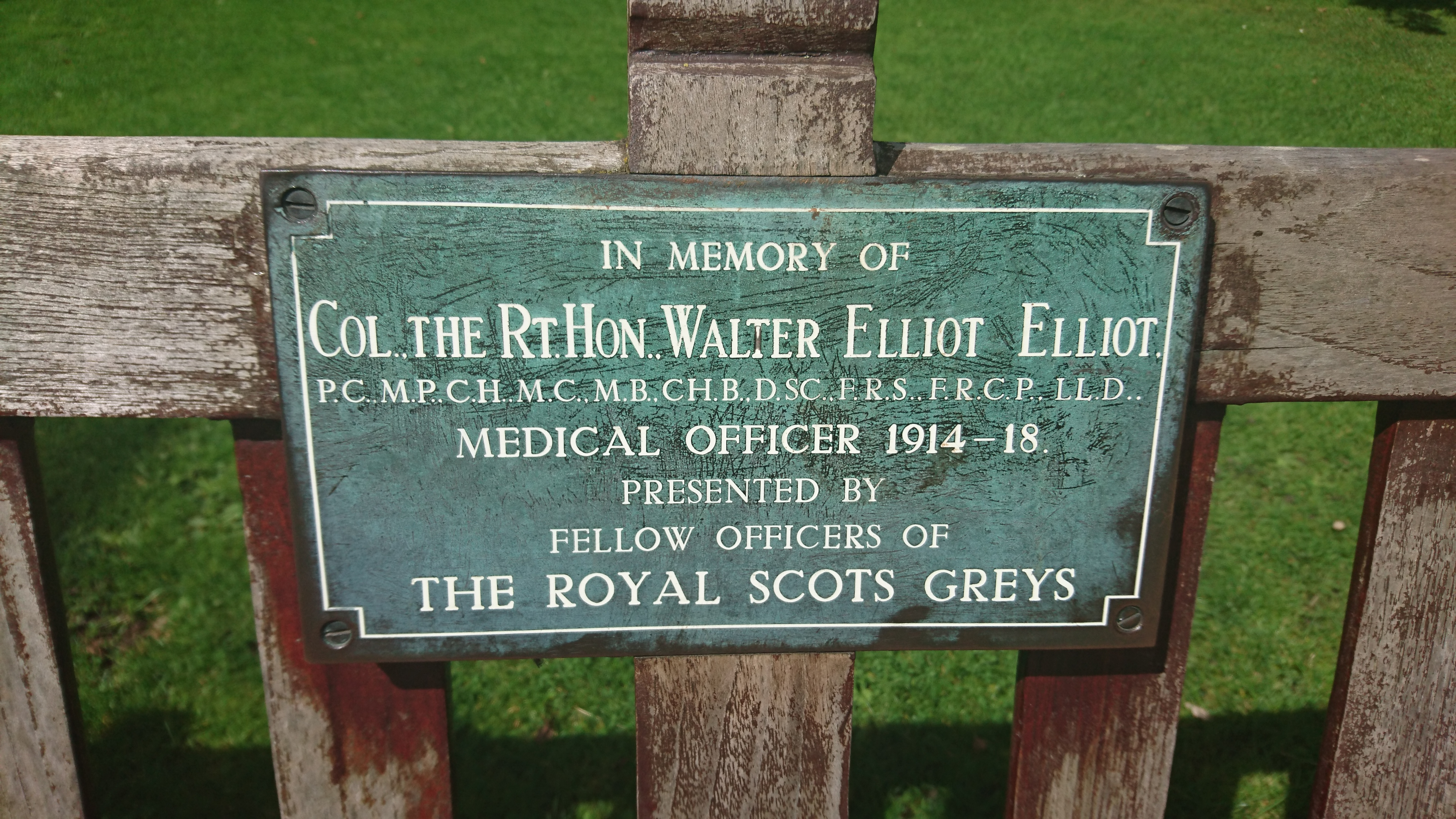
Memorial bench dedicated to Walter Elliot in Princes Street Gardens, Edinburgh, "presented by fellow officers of the Royal Scots Greys"

== Publications ==
- Toryism in the Twentieth Century (1927)
- Long Distance (1943)

== Recognition ==
The Elliot Library at the Glasgow University Union is named after him, the main part of which consists of 2,000 books from Elliot's own library at Harwood. The Library was opened by then Prime Minister Harold Macmillan in 1962.

== Bibliography ==
- Torrance, David, The Scottish Secretaries (Birlinn 2006)
- Boyd-Orr; Sir Stephen Tallents (1958) [1958]. "Walter Elliot". Biographical Memoirs of Fellows of the Royal Society, Volume 4. London: Royal Society.

Parliament of the United Kingdom
| New constituency | Member of Parliament for Lanark; 1918 – 1923 | Succeeded by Thomas Scott Dickson |
| Preceded by William Hutchison | Member of Parliament for Glasgow Kelvingrove; 1924–1945 | Succeeded by John Lloyd Williams |
| Preceded by John Boyd Orr; John Anderson; Sir John Graham Kerr | Member of Parliament for Combined Scottish Universities; 1946 – 1950; With: John Anderson; Sir John Graham Kerr | Constituency abolished |
| Preceded by John Lloyd Williams | Member of Parliament for Glasgow Kelvingrove; 1950 – 1958 | Succeeded by Mary McAlister |
Political offices
| Preceded by Frederick Pethick-Lawrence | Financial Secretary to the Treasury; 1931–1932 | Succeeded by Leslie Hore-Belisha |
| Preceded by John Gilmour | Minister of Agriculture; 1932–1936 | Succeeded by William Morrison |
| Preceded by Godfrey Collins | Secretary of State for Scotland; 1936–1938 | Succeeded by John Colville |
| Preceded by Sir Kingsley Wood | Minister of Health; 1938–1940 | Succeeded by Malcolm MacDonald |
Academic offices
| Preceded by Arthur Keith | Rector of the University of Aberdeen; 1933–1936 | Succeeded by Sir Edward Evans |
| Preceded by John Boyd Orr | Rector of the University of Glasgow; 1947–1950 | Succeeded by John MacCormick |
