= John Williams (Glasgow politician) =

Scottish Labour politician

John Lloyd Williams (1888 – 31 December 1982) was a Labour Party politician in Scotland.

Williams was born in 1888, educated in Machynlleth, and then at the Central Labour College in London. He worked as a journalist, and joined the Labour Party. From 1938 until 1945, he served on Glasgow Corporation.

He was the member of parliament (MP) for Glasgow Kelvingrove from 1945 to 1950, when he was defeated by the Conservative Walter Elliot. Williams challenged Elliot again in 1955 but was unsuccessful.

Parliament of the United Kingdom
Preceded by Walter Elliot	Member of Parliament for Glasgow Kelvingrove; 1945–1950	Succeeded by Walter Elliot
