= Thomas Dickson (Scottish politician) =

Scottish politician and journalist (1885–1935)

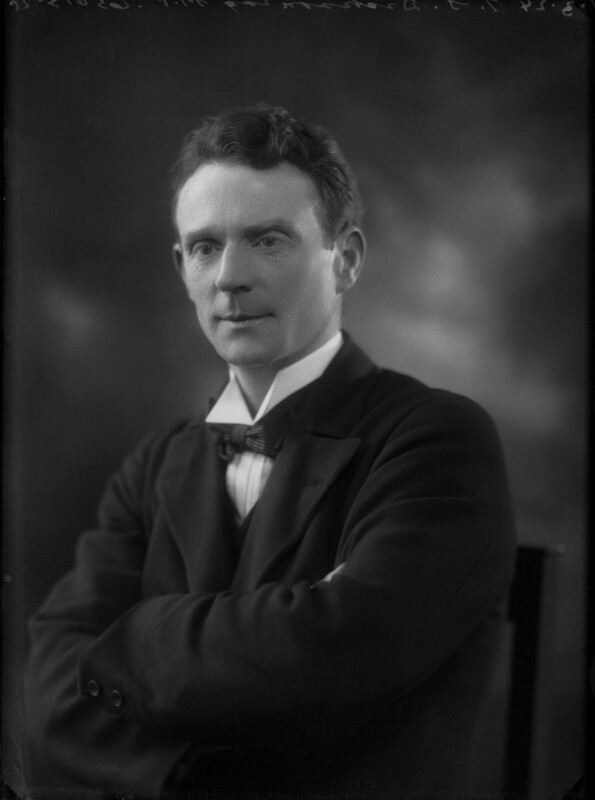
Dickson in 1924

Thomas Scott Dickson (1 November 1885 – 25 January 1935) was a Scottish politician and journalist, who served as a Member of Parliament for two terms.

Born in Cleland, Dickson worked variously in a shop, a quarry, a mine and a steel works. In 1905, he became a journalist, serving as a reporter for The Scotsman, then rising to become assistant editor of Forward. He also joined the National Union of Journalists, and served as its president in 1925–26.

Dickson joined the Labour Party, and won election to Lanark County Council, serving for four years. At the 1923 UK general election, Dickson was elected in Lanark. He was narrowly defeated in 1924, and re-elected in 1929, but did not seek re-election in 1931.

Parliament of the United Kingdom
Preceded by Walter Elliot	Member of Parliament for Lanark; 1923–1924	Succeeded by Stephen Mitchell
Preceded by Stephen Mitchell	Member of Parliament for Lanark; 1929–1931	Succeeded by Lord Dunglass
Trade union offices
Preceded by T. K. Sledge	President of the National Union of Journalists; 1925–1926	Succeeded by A. J. Rhodes
