= William Hutchison (MP for Glasgow Kelvingrove) =

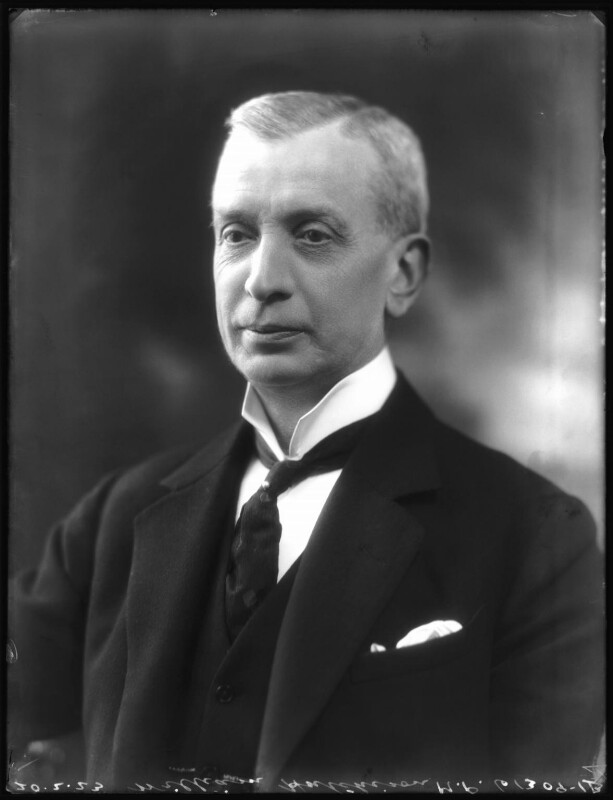
Hutchison in 1923

William Hutchison (c.1870 – 1 May 1924) was a Glasgow solicitor who served as a Unionist Member of Parliament for Glasgow Kelvingrove from 1922 until his death.

He had previously contested the Glasgow Bridgeton constituency as a Conservative.

Parliament of the United Kingdom
Preceded by John MacLeod	Member of Parliament for Glasgow Kelvingrove; 1922–1924	Succeeded by Walter Elliot
