= Aitken Ferguson =

Scottish communist activist (1891-1975)

Aitken Ferguson (1891 – 1975) was a Scottish communist activist and political candidate.

Born in Glasgow, Ferguson was named after his father. He worked as a boilermaker, and was active in the Socialist Labour Party. He co-founded the Clyde Workers Committee during World War I, and soon after joined his local Labour Party and the Communist Party of Great Britain (CPGB). He stood in Glasgow Kelvingrove at the 1923 general election as a communist candidate, with the support of the Amalgamated Society of Boilermakers and the local Labour Party, but not the national body. Despite the lack of national support, he performed strongly, finishing 1,000 votes behind the successful Conservative Party candidate.

At the 1924 Glasgow Kelvingrove by-election, Ferguson stood again. The Independent Labour Party opposed his candidacy, initially championing Patrick Dollan as a possible Labour candidate, but Dollan withdrew his name, and on this occasion, Ferguson became the official Labour candidate. However, Arthur Henderson objected to an advert in Workers Weekly (the CPGB newspaper), which asked for donations for Ferguson's campaign, and also specified radical policy goals. Although official Labour sponsorship was not withdrawn, Ferguson received no practical support from the national party. He increased his vote total to over 11,000, but again missed out as many Liberal Party supporters voted tactically for the Conservative candidate.

In 1925, most of the CPGB leadership was arrested, and Ferguson was appointed to an emergency committee, alongside Bob Stewart, George Hardy, Andrew Rothstein, and Emile Burns. Following this, he addressed the executive of the Comintern in 1926 on the perspectives of the National Minority Movement. He also polled strongly in Anderston ward, standing for Glasgow City Council in 1927, and stood for the CPGB in Aberdeen North at a 1928 by-election and the 1929 general election. Although he was well behind the victor on both occasions, his result was considered respectable by the CPGB leadership, as the Aberdeen branch of the party had only ten members.

Perhaps because of his experiences with the Labour Party, Ferguson was an enthusiastic supporter of the "New Line", in which the CPGB distanced itself from Labour; Ferguson only complaining that the line was not being enforced strongly enough. As a result, he was appointed to the CPGB's central committee in 1929. He stood in Greenock at the 1931 general election, placing third but not far behind the Labour Party candidate. In 1932, he was sent to Cumbria to try to strengthen the party there, and he stood for Carlisle City Council. Following this stint, he was a key figure in the Scottish CPGB for many years, and led calls for Scottish devolution within the party. He worked with John MacCormick and Roland Muirhead of the Scottish National Party and developed a policy calling for a Scottish Parliament. This was unpopular within the Scottish party, but Ferguson won the support of the national executive, and it became party policy.
