= Lanark (UK Parliament constituency) =

Parliamentary constituency in the United Kingdom, 1918–1983

Coordinates: 55.674°N 3.782°W

- Former county constituency for the House of Commons

1918–1983
- Seats: One
- Created from: South Lanarkshire and Mid Lanarkshire
- Replaced by: Clydesdale, Motherwell North and Motherwell South

Lanark was a county constituency of the House of Commons of the Parliament of the United Kingdom (Westminster) from 1918 to 1983. It elected one Member of Parliament (MP) by the first past the post voting system.

There was also an earlier Lanark Burghs constituency, from 1708 to 1832.

== Boundaries ==
From 1918, the constituency consisted of "The Upper Ward County District, inclusive of all burghs situated therein, together with the part of the Middle Ward County District which is contained within the parishes of Avondale, East Kilbride, Glassford, and Stonehouse."

The Representation of the People Act 1948 provided that the constituency was to consist of "(i) The burghs of Biggar and Lanark; and (ii) the first, second and third districts and, so far as not included in the Hamilton constituency, the fourth and fifth districts."

== Members of Parliament ==
| Election | Member | Party |
|---|---|---|
| 1918 | Walter Elliot | Unionist |
| 1923 | Thomas Scott Dickson | Labour |
| 1924 | Stephen Mitchell | Unionist |
| 1929 | Thomas Scott Dickson | Labour |
| 1931 | Alec Douglas-Home, Lord Dunglass | Unionist |
| 1945 | Tom Steele | Labour |
| 1950 | Alec Douglas-Home, Lord Dunglass | Unionist |
| 1951 | Patrick Maitland | Unionist |
| 1959 | Judith Hart | Labour |
| 1983 | Constituency abolished | |

== Election results ==
=== Elections in the 1910s ===
General election 1918: Lanark
| Party | | Candidate | Votes | % | ±% |
|---|---|---|---|---|---|
| C | Unionist | Walter Elliot | 12,976 | 69.0 | |
| | Labour | James C. Welsh | 5,821 | 31.0 | |
| Majority | | | 7,155 | 38.0 | |
| Turnout | | | 18,797 | 68.5 | |
| Registered electors | | | 27,434 | | |
| | Unionist win (new seat) | | | | |
C indicates candidate endorsed by the coalition government.

=== Elections in the 1920s ===
General election 1922: Lanark
| Party | Candidate | Votes | % | ±% |
|---|---|---|---|---|
| Unionist | Walter Elliot | 12,005 | 55.0 | −14.0 |
| Labour | Thomas Dickson | 9,812 | 45.0 | +14.0 |
| Majority | | 2,193 | 10.0 | −28.0 |
| Turnout | | 21,817 | 75.0 | +6.5 |
| Registered electors | | 29,074 | | |
| Unionist hold | | Swing | −14.0 | |

General election 1923: Lanark
| Party | Candidate | Votes | % | ±% |
|---|---|---|---|---|
| Labour | Thomas Dickson | 11,384 | 50.5 | +5.5 |
| Unionist | Walter Elliot | 11,154 | 49.5 | −5.5 |
| Majority | | 230 | 1.0 | N/A |
| Turnout | | 22,538 | 74.9 | −0.1 |
| Registered electors | | 30,071 | | |
| Labour gain from Unionist | | Swing | +5.5 | |

Elizabeth Mitchell

General election 1924: Lanark
| Party | Candidate | Votes | % | ±% |
|---|---|---|---|---|
| Unionist | Stephen Mitchell | 12,714 | 48.4 | −1.1 |
| Labour | Thomas Dickson | 11,426 | 43.5 | −7.0 |
| Liberal | Elizabeth Mitchell | 2,126 | 8.1 | New |
| Majority | | 1,288 | 4.9 | N/A |
| Turnout | | 26,266 | 84.3 | +9.4 |
| Registered electors | | 31,164 | | |
| Unionist gain from Labour | | Swing | +3.0 | |

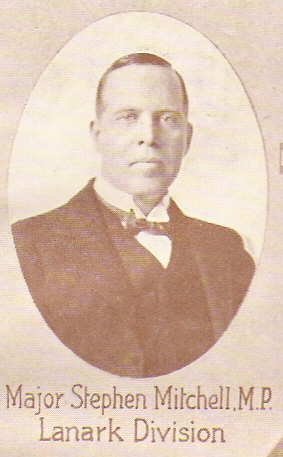

General election 1929: Lanark
| Party | Candidate | Votes | % | ±% |
|---|---|---|---|---|
| Labour | Thomas Dickson | 15,054 | 48.7 | +5.2 |
| Unionist | Stephen Mitchell | 12,652 | 41.0 | −7.4 |
| Liberal | James Mullo Weir | 3,177 | 10.3 | +2.2 |
| Majority | | 2,402 | 7.7 | N/A |
| Turnout | | 30,883 | 78.8 | −5.5 |
| Registered electors | | 39,201 | | |
| Labour gain from Unionist | | Swing | +6.3 | |

=== Elections in the 1930s ===
General election 1931: Lanark
| Party | Candidate | Votes | % | ±% |
|---|---|---|---|---|
| Unionist | Alec Douglas-Home, Lord Dunglass | 20,675 | 63.63 | |
| Ind. Labour Party | Jack Gibson | 11,815 | 36.37 | N/A |
| Majority | | 8,860 | 27.26 | N/A |
| Turnout | | 32,490 | 82.48 | |
| Unionist gain from Labour | | Swing | | |

General election 1935: Lanark
| Party | Candidate | Votes | % | ±% |
|---|---|---|---|---|
| Unionist | Alec Douglas-Home, Lord Dunglass | 17,759 | 56.75 | |
| Labour | Jack Gibson | 10,950 | 34.99 | N/A |
| Ind. Labour Party | William Carlin | 2,583 | 8.25 | |
| Majority | | 6,809 | 21.76 | |
| Turnout | | 31,292 | 75.96 | |
| Unionist hold | | Swing | | |

=== Election in the 1940s ===
General election 1945: Lanark
| Party | Candidate | Votes | % | ±% |
|---|---|---|---|---|
| Labour | Tom Steele | 17,784 | 52.80 | |
| Unionist | Alec Douglas-Home, Lord Dunglass | 15,900 | 47.20 | |
| Majority | | 1,884 | 5.60 | N/A |
| Turnout | | 33,684 | 74.93 | |
| Labour gain from Unionist | | Swing | | |

=== Elections in the 1950s ===
General election 1950: Lanark
| Party | Candidate | Votes | % | ±% |
|---|---|---|---|---|
| Unionist | Alec Douglas-Home, Lord Dunglass | 19,890 | 50.88 | |
| Labour | Tom Steele | 19,205 | 49.12 | |
| Majority | | 685 | 1.76 | N/A |
| Turnout | | 39,095 | 84.70 | |
| Unionist gain from Labour | | Swing | | |

General election 1951: Lanark
| Party | Candidate | Votes | % | ±% |
|---|---|---|---|---|
| Unionist | Patrick Maitland | 21,467 | 52.18 | |
| Labour | William L. Taylor | 19,674 | 47.82 | |
| Majority | | 1,793 | 4.36 | |
| Turnout | | 41,141 | 97.31 | |
| Unionist hold | | Swing | | |

General election 1955: Lanark
| Party | Candidate | Votes | % | ±% |
|---|---|---|---|---|
| Unionist | Patrick Maitland | 21,828 | 51.12 | |
| Labour | John Mackie | 20,870 | 48.88 | |
| Majority | | 958 | 2.24 | |
| Turnout | | 42,698 | 85.87 | |
| Unionist hold | | Swing | | |

General election 1959: Lanark
| Party | Candidate | Votes | % | ±% |
|---|---|---|---|---|
| Labour | Judith Hart | 25,171 | 50.54 | |
| Unionist | Patrick Maitland | 24,631 | 49.46 | |
| Majority | | 540 | 1.08 | N/A |
| Turnout | | 49,802 | 87.23 | |
| Labour gain from Unionist | | Swing | | |

=== Elections in the 1960s ===
General election 1964: Lanark
| Party | Candidate | Votes | % | ±% |
|---|---|---|---|---|
| Labour | Judith Hart | 30,242 | 54.82 | |
| Unionist | William Beale | 24,922 | 45.18 | |
| Majority | | 5,320 | 9.64 | |
| Turnout | | 55,164 | 85.97 | |
| Labour hold | | Swing | | |

General election 1966: Lanark
| Party | Candidate | Votes | % | ±% |
|---|---|---|---|---|
| Labour | Judith Hart | 29,735 | 51.65 | |
| Conservative | William Beale | 21,995 | 38.21 | |
| SNP | Harry Rankin | 5,838 | 10.14 | New |
| Majority | | 7,740 | 13.44 | |
| Turnout | | 57,568 | 83.72 | |
| Labour hold | | Swing | | |

=== Elections in the 1970s ===
General election 1970: Lanark
| Party | Candidate | Votes | % | ±% |
|---|---|---|---|---|
| Labour | Judith Hart | 30,194 | 45.03 | |
| Conservative | Alan C.S. MacDougall | 27,721 | 41.35 | |
| SNP | Harry Rankin | 7,859 | 11.72 | |
| Communist | David McDowall | 1,273 | 1.90 | New |
| Majority | | 2,473 | 3.68 | |
| Turnout | | 67,047 | 79.45 | |
| Labour hold | | Swing | | |

General election February 1974: Lanark
| Party | Candidate | Votes | % | ±% |
|---|---|---|---|---|
| Labour | Judith Hart | 16,823 | 41.69 | |
| Conservative | Alan C. S. MacDougall | 14,723 | 36.49 | |
| SNP | Thomas McAlpine | 8,803 | 21.82 | |
| Majority | | 2,100 | 5.20 | |
| Turnout | | 40,349 | 83.96 | |
| Labour hold | | Swing | | |

General election October 1974: Lanark
| Party | Candidate | Votes | % | ±% |
|---|---|---|---|---|
| Labour | Judith Hart | 14,948 | 37.56 | |
| SNP | Thomas McAlpine | 14,250 | 35.81 | |
| Conservative | Arthur Bell | 9,222 | 23.17 | |
| Liberal | Fred McDermid | 1,374 | 3.45 | New |
| Majority | | 698 | 1.75 | |
| Turnout | | 39,794 | 82.21 | |
| Labour hold | | Swing | | |

General election 1979: Lanark
| Party | Candidate | Votes | % | ±% |
|---|---|---|---|---|
| Labour | Judith Hart | 18,118 | 43.2 | +5.6 |
| Conservative | Arthur Bell | 12,979 | 30.9 | +7.7 |
| SNP | Thomas McAlpine | 7,902 | 18.8 | −17.0 |
| Liberal | Fred McDermid | 2,967 | 7.1 | +3.7 |
| Majority | | 5,139 | 12.2 | +10.5 |
| Turnout | | 41,966 | 81.8 | −0.4 |
| Labour hold | | Swing | | |
