= 1988 in the United Kingdom =

Events from the year 1988 in the United Kingdom. The year saw the merger in March of the SDP and the Liberals to form the Liberal Democrats. There were also two notable disasters this year: the Piper Alpha oil rig explosion and the bombing of Pan Am Flight 103.

== Incumbents ==
- Monarch – Elizabeth II
- Prime Minister – Margaret Thatcher (Conservative)

== Events ==
=== January ===
- January – Elizabeth Butler-Sloss becomes the first woman to be appointed a Lord Justice of Appeal.
- 3 January – Margaret Thatcher becomes the longest-serving UK Prime Minister this century, having been in power for eight years and 244 days.
- 4 January – Sir Robin Butler replaces Sir Robert Armstrong as Cabinet Secretary, on the same day that Margaret Thatcher makes her first state visit to Africa when she arrives in Kenya.
- 5 January – Actor Rowan Atkinson launches the new Comic Relief charity appeal.
- 7 January – Labour Party leader Neil Kinnock calls for a further £1,300,000,000 to be made available for the National Health Service.
- 8 January – The Society of Motor Manufacturers and Traders reveals that new car sales in Britain last year exceeded 2,000,000 for the first time. The Ford Escort was Britain's best-selling car for the sixth year running.
- 11 January – The government announces that inflammable foam furniture will be banned from March next year.
- 14 January – Unemployment figures are released for the end of 1987, showing the eighteenth-successive monthly decrease. Just over 2,600,000 people are now unemployed in the United Kingdom – the lowest figure for seven years. More than 500,000 of those unemployed, found jobs in 1987.
- 22 January
  - Colin Pitchfork is sentenced to life imprisonment after admitting the rape and murder of two girls in Leicestershire in 1983 and 1986, the first conviction for murder in the UK based on DNA fingerprinting evidence.
  - Peugeot's British-built 405 saloon, winner of the European Car of the Year award, goes on sale in Britain. A five-door estate model is due later this year.
- 23 January – David Steel announces that he will not stand for the leadership of the new Social and Liberal Democratic Party.
- 24 January – Arthur Scargill is re-elected as Leader of the National Union of Mineworkers by a narrow majority.
- 28 January – The Birmingham Six lose an appeal against their convictions.

=== February ===
- 1 February – Victor Miller, a 33-year-old warehouse worker from Wolverhampton, confesses to the murder of 14-year-old Stuart Gough, who was found dead in Worcestershire last month.
- 3 February – Nurses throughout the UK strike for higher pay and more funding for the National Health Service.
- 4 February – Nearly 7,000 ferry workers go on strike in Britain, paralysing the nation's seaports.
- 5 February – The first BBC Red Nose Day raises £15,000,000 for charity.
- 7 February – It is reported that more than 50% of men and 80% of women working full-time in London, are earning less than the lowest sum needed to buy the cheapest houses in the capital.
- 9 February – Helen McCourt, a 22-year-old insurance clerk from Lancashire (now Merseyside), disappeared after getting off a bus less than 500 yards from her home in the village of Billinge. Her body has never been found.
- 13 – 28 February – Great Britain and Northern Ireland compete at the Winter Olympics in Calgary, Alberta, Canada, but do not win any medals.
- 15 February – Norman Fowler, Secretary of State for Employment, announces plans for a new training scheme which the government hopes will give jobs to up to 600,000 people who are currently unemployed.
- 16 February – Thousands of nurses and co-workers form picket lines outside British hospitals as they go on strike in protest against what they see as inadequate NHS funding.
- 26 February – Multiple rapist and murderer John Duffy is sentenced to life imprisonment with a recommendation that he should never be released.

=== March ===
- 1 March – British Aerospace launches a takeover bid for the government-owned Rover Group, the largest British-owned carmaker.
- 3 March – The SDP amalgamates with the Liberal Party to form the Social and Liberal Democratic Party. Its interim leaders are David Steel and Robert Maclennan. The merger means that the Liberal Party has ceased to exist after 129 years.
- 4 March – Halifax Building Society reveals that year-on-year house prices rose by 16.9% last month.
- 6 March – Operation Flavius: a Special Air Service team of the British Army shoots dead three unarmed members of a Provisional Irish Republican Army (IRA) Active Service Unit in Gibraltar.
- 7 March – Margaret Thatcher announces a £3,000,000,000 regeneration scheme to improve a series of inner city areas by the year 2000.
- 9 March – It is revealed that the average price of a house in Britain reached £60,000 at the end of last year, compared to £47,000 in December 1986.
- 10 March – The Prince of Wales (now Charles III) narrowly avoids death in an avalanche while on a skiing holiday in Switzerland. Major Hugh Lindsay, former equerry to the Queen, is killed.
- 11 March – The Bank of England £1 note ceases to be legal tender.
- 15 March – In the 1988 budget, Chancellor Nigel Lawson announces that the standard rate of income tax will be cut to 25p in the pound, while the maximum rate of income tax will be cut to 40p from 60p in the pound.
- 16 March – Milltown Cemetery attack: three men are killed and 70 are wounded by loyalist paramilitary Michael Stone at Milltown Cemetery in Belfast during the funerals of the three IRA members killed in Gibraltar.
- 17 March – The fall in unemployment continues, with just over 2,500,000 people now registered as unemployed in the UK. However, there is a blow for the city of Dundee, when Ford Motor Company scraps plans to build a new electronics plant in the city – a move which ends hopes of 1,000 new jobs being created for this city which has high unemployment.
- 19 March – Corporals killings in Belfast: British Army corporals Woods and Howes are abducted, beaten and shot dead by Irish republicans after driving into the funeral cortege of an IRA member killed in the Milltown Cemetery attack.
- 29 March – Plans are unveiled for Europe's tallest skyscraper to be built at Canary Wharf. The office complex will cost around £3,000,000,000 to build, and is set to open in 1992.

=== April ===
- 9 April – The house price boom is reported to have boosted wealth in London and the South-East by £39,000,000,000 over the last four years, compared with an £18,000,000,000 slump in Scotland and the North-West of England.
- 10 April – Golfer Sandy Lyle becomes the first British winner of the Masters.
- 21 April – The government announces that nurses will receive a 15% pay rise, at a cost of £794,000,000 which will be funded by the Treasury.
- 24 April – Luton Town FC beat Arsenal in the Littlewoods Cup final at Wembley 3–2. The match was won in the 92nd minute with a goal by Brian Stein after Luton had come back from being 2–1 down and goalkeeper Andy Dibble saving a penalty in the 79th minute. Luton scorers Brian Stein (2) and Danny Wilson. 96,000 fans were in attendance.

=== May ===
- May – The first group of sixteen-year-olds sit General Certificate of Secondary Education examinations, replacing both the O-level and CSE. The new qualifications are marked against objective standards rather than relatively.
- 2 May – Three off-duty British servicemen are killed in the Netherlands by the IRA.
- 6 May – Graeme Hick makes English cricket history by scoring 405 runs in a county championship match.
- 7 May – The proposed Poll tax (referred to by the Government as the Community Charge), which is expected to come into force next year, will see the average house rise in value by around 20%, according to a study.
- 14 May – Wimbledon F.C., who have been Football League members for just eleven seasons and First Division members for two, win the FA Cup with a 1–0 win over league champions Liverpool at Wembley. Lawrie Sanchez scored the winning goal in the first half, while Liverpool's John Aldridge missed a penalty in the second half. In Scotland, Celtic beat Dundee United 2–1 in the Scottish Cup final with two late goals from Frank McAvennie to complete the Scottish double.
- 19 May
  - Unemployment is now below 2,500,000 for the first time since early-1981.
  - House prices in Norwich, one of the key beneficiaries of the current economic boom, have risen by 50% in the last year.
- 24 May
  - Local Government Act becomes law. The controversial Section 28 prevents local authorities from "promoting homosexuality". Local authorities are also obliged to outsource more services, and dog licences are abolished (except in Northern Ireland).
  - Albert Dock in Liverpool reopened by Prince Charles (now Charles III) as a leisure and business centre including the Tate Liverpool art museum.
- 31 May – The controversial BBC film Tumbledown is broadcast despite Ministry of Defence concern.

=== June ===
- 2 June – U.S. President Ronald Reagan makes a visit to the UK.
- 11 June – Some 80,000 people attend a concert at Wembley Stadium in honour of Nelson Mandela, the South African anti-apartheid campaigner who has been imprisoned since 1964.
- 15 June – Six British soldiers are killed by the IRA in Lisburn.
- 16 June – More than one hundred English football fans are arrested in West Germany in connection with incidents of football hooliganism during the European Championships.
- 18 June – England's participation in the European Football Championships ended when they finished bottom of their group having lost all three games.
- 21 June – The Poole explosion of 1988 causes 3,500 people to be evacuated from Poole town centre in the biggest peacetime evacuation in the United Kingdom since World War II.
- 23 June – Three gay rights activists invade the BBC television studios during the six o'clock bulletin of the BBC News.

=== July ===
- July – The Freeze art exhibition is held at Surrey Docks in London Docklands. It is organised by Damien Hirst, and is considered significant in the development of the Young British Artists.
- 5 July – The Church of England announces that it will allow the ordination of female priests from 1992.
- 6 July
  - Piper Alpha disaster: the Piper Alpha oil rig in the North Sea explodes and results in the death of 167 workers.
  - A contractor's relief driver pours twenty tonnes of aluminium sulphate into the wrong tank at a water treatment plant near Camelford in Cornwall, causing extensive pollution to the local water supply.
- 8 July – The final large stationary steam engine in use in a British factory is shut down at a tannery in Otley.
- 14 July – The Kensington by-election, caused by the death of the sitting Conservative MP Sir Brandon Rhys-Williams on 18 May, takes place. Dudley Fishburn manages to hold the seat for the Conservatives by a narrow margin.
- 18 July – Paul Gascoigne, 21-year-old midfielder, becomes the first £2,000,000 footballer signed by a British club when he leaves Newcastle United and joins Tottenham Hotspur.
- 28 July – Paddy Ashdown, MP for Yeovil in Somerset, is elected as the first Leader of the Social and Liberal Democratic Party.
- 29 July – Most provisions of the Education Reform Act come into effect in England, Wales and Northern Ireland. The Act introduces Grant-maintained schools and Local Management of Schools, allowing schools to be taken out of the direct control of local government; a National Curriculum with Key Stages; an element of parental preference in the choice of schools; published league tables of school examination results; controls on the use of the word 'degree' by UK institutions; and abolition of tenure for new academics.
- 31 July – Economists warn that the house price boom is likely to end next year.

=== August ===
- 1 August – A soldier is killed and Inglis Barracks in London is damaged in a bombing.
- 2 August – Everton F.C. pay £2,300,000 for West Ham United striker Tony Cottee, 22, breaking the national record set six weeks ago by Paul Gascoigne's transfer.
- 8 August –Princess Beatrice daughter of the Duke and Duchess of York is born at Portland Hospital in London. She is fifth in line to the throne until the birth of Prince George on 22 July 2013 and later ninth in line.
- 14 August – Scunthorpe United F.C.'s Glanford Park is opened; the first new stadium to be built by a Football League club since the 1950s. Their last game at their original ground, Old Showground, was on 18 May.
- 18 August – Ian Rush becomes the most expensive player to join a British club when he returns to Liverpool F.C. for £2,700,000 after a year at Juventus in Italy.
- 20 August – Ballygawley bus bombing: Six British soldiers are killed by an IRA bomb near Belfast; twenty-eight others are injured.
- 22 August
  - New licensing laws allow pubs to stay open all day in England and Wales.
  - The Duke and Duchess of York's fourteen-day-old daughter is named Beatrice Elizabeth Mary.
- 29 August – Fourteen-year-old Matthew Sadler becomes Britain's youngest international chess master.
- 31 August – Postal workers walk out on strike over a dispute concerning bonuses paid to recruit new workers in London and the South East.

=== September ===
- 3 September – Economic experts warn that the recent economic upturn for most of the developed world is almost over, and that these countries – including Britain – face a recession in the near future.
- 9 September – The England cricket team's tour to India is cancelled after Captain Graham Gooch and seven other players are refused visas because of involvement in South African cricket during the apartheid boycott.
- 10 September – Teenager Lee Boxell disappears in South London whilst out shopping with a friend and is never found.
- 13 September – Royal Mail managers and Union of Communication Workers representatives agree a settlement to end the postal workers strike.
- 17 September – Great Britain and Northern Ireland compete at the 1988 Summer Olympics in Seoul, South Korea, and win 5 gold, 10 silver and 9 bronze medals.
- 20 September – Margaret Thatcher gives her "Bruges speech", opposing moves to transition the European Economic Community into a federal Europe.
- 24 September – The house price boom is reported to be slowing as a result of increased mortgage rates.
- 30 September – Operation Flavius: A Gibraltar jury decides that the IRA members killed in March were killed "lawfully".

=== October ===
- 9 October – Labour MP and Shadow Chancellor John Smith, 50, is hospitalised due to a heart attack in Edinburgh.
- 12 October – As Pope John Paul II addresses the European Parliament, Ian Paisley heckles and denounces him as the Antichrist.
- 13 October – The Law Lords rule that extracts from the book Spycatcher, banned in England and Wales, can be published in the media.
- 14 October – Vauxhall launches the third and final generation of its popular Cavalier hatchback and saloon which will be built by General Motors in European factories including the Luton plant and sold outside the UK as the Opel Vectra. A Cavalier-based coupe will be launched next year.
- 18 October – Jaguar unveils its new Jaguar XJ220 supercar at the Motor Show. It is set to go into production in 1990, costing £350,000 and being the world's fastest production car with a top speed of 220mph.
- 19 October – The United Kingdom bans broadcast interviews with IRA members. The BBC gets around this stricture through the use of professional actors.
- 20 October – Nikola Štedul, a Croatian nationalist from Yugoslavia, is shot in Kirkcaldy but survives. The shooter, Vinko Sindičić, also a Yugoslav, is later arrested at Heathrow Airport.
- 27 October – Three IRA supporters are found guilty of conspiracy to murder in connection with a plot to kill Secretary of State for Northern Ireland Tom King.
- 28 October – British Rail announces a 21% increase in the cost of long distance season tickets.

=== November ===
- 2 November – Victor Miller is sentenced to life imprisonment for the murder of 14-year-old Stuart Gough in Worcestershire earlier this year, with a recommendation by the trial judge that he is not considered for parole for at least thirty years.
- 4 November – Margaret Thatcher presses for freedom for the people of Poland on her visit to Gdańsk.
- 9 November – The government unveils plans for a new identity card scheme in an attempt to clamp down on football hooliganism.
- 10 November
  - The Govan by-election in Glasgow, caused by the resignation of Labour MP Bruce Millan on 18 October, takes place. Labour is defeated by the Scottish National Party under Jim Sillars.
  - The Post is launched as a national newspaper by Eddy Shah. Although produced (in Warrington) using advanced techniques, it survives for just five weeks.
- 15 November
  - The Education Secretary, Kenneth Baker, says that the national testing will place greater emphasis on grammar.
  - Firearms (Amendment) Act 1988 prohibits civilian ownership of virtually all semi-automatic firearms from January 1989, in response to the Hungerford massacre of 1987.
- 30 November
  - A government report reveals that up to 50,000 people in Britain may be HIV positive, and that by the end of 1992, up to 17,000 people may have died from AIDS.
  - A bronze statue of former Labour Prime Minister Clement Attlee is unveiled in London by another former Labour Prime Minister, Harold Wilson.

=== December ===
- 3 December – Salmonella-in-eggs controversy: Health Minister Edwina Currie provokes outrage among suppliers by stating that most of Britain's egg production is infected with the salmonella bacteria, causing an immediate and lasting nationwide decrease in egg sales.
- 6 December – The last shipbuilding facilities on Wearside, once the largest shipbuilding area in the world, are to close with the loss of 2,400 jobs.
- 10 December – James W. Black wins the Nobel Prize in Physiology or Medicine jointly with Gertrude B. Elion and George H. Hitchings "for their discoveries of important principles for drug treatment".
- 12 December – 35 people are killed in the Clapham Junction rail crash.
- 15 December
  - Unemployment is now only just over 2,100,000 – the lowest level for almost eight years.
  - The Epping Forest by-election, caused by the death of the sitting Conservative MP Sir John Biggs-Davison on 17 September, takes place. Steven Norris holds the seat for the Conservatives.
- 16 December
  - Edwina Currie resigns as Health Minister.
  - A series of burglaries take place and a man is murdered during the early hours around the M25 motorway, leading to conviction, subsequently ruled unsafe, of the 'M25 Three'.
- 19 December
  - The Royal Institution of Chartered Surveyors publishes its house price survey, revealing a deep recession in the housing market.
  - PC Gavin Carlton, 29, is shot dead in Coventry in a siege by two armed bank robbers. His colleague DC Leonard Jakeman is also shot but survives. One of the gunmen gives himself up to police, while the other shoots himself dead.
- 20 December – The three-month-old daughter of the Duke and Duchess of York is christened Beatrice Elizabeth Mary.
- 21 December – Pan Am Flight 103 explodes over the town of Lockerbie due to a Libyan terrorist bomb, killing a total of 270 people – all 259 on board and 11 on the ground.

=== Undated ===
- Inflation remains low for the seventh year running, now standing at 4.9%.
- The Communist Party of Britain is founded by a Marxist–Leninist faction of the Communist Party of Great Britain after the latter's leadership embraces Eurocommunism.
- TAT-8, the first transatlantic telephone cable to use optical fibers, is completed, coming ashore in Cornwall.
- Diggers of the foundations of the new Art Gallery at the Guildhall in the City of London accidentally discover the remains of a Roman amphitheatre, now on public display.
- York City Levy, living-history group is founded.

== Publications ==
- 17 May – Hello! magazine launched in the UK.
- Iain M. Banks' novel The Player of Games.
- Bruce Chatwin's novel Utz.
- Roald Dahl's children's novel Matilda
- Physicist Stephen Hawking's book A Brief History of Time.
- David Lodge's novel Nice Work.
- Terry Pratchett's Discworld novels Sourcery and Wyrd Sisters.

== Births ==
=== January ===
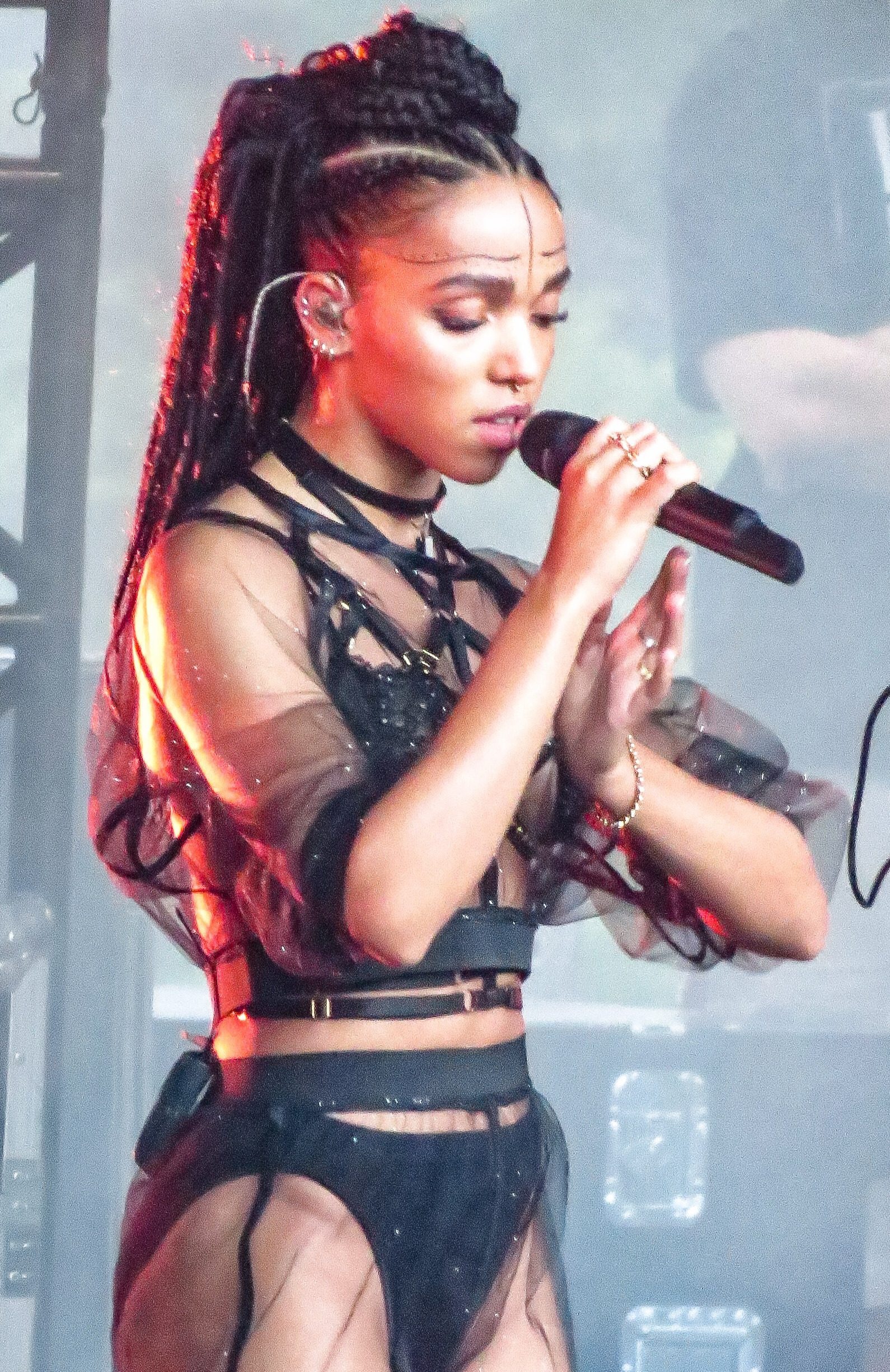
FKA Twigs

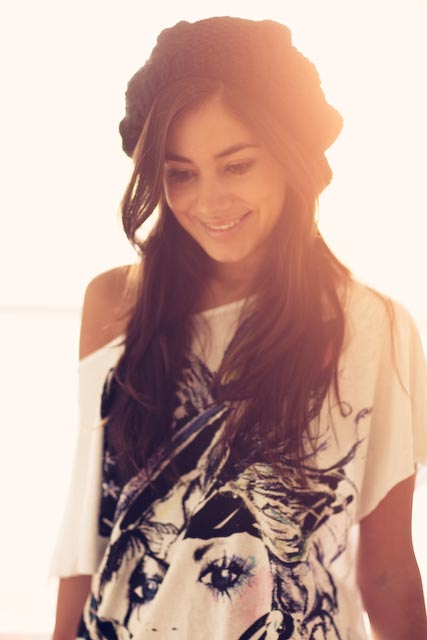
Mia Rose

- 6 January – Nathan Catt, rugby player
- 7 January – Alan Lowing, footballer
- 9 January – Jodie Broughton, rugby player
- 10 January
  - Michael McIlorum, rugby league footballer
  - Rachel Williams, footballer
- 12 January – Chris Casement, footballer
- 13 January – Adam Bailey, footballer
- 14 January
  - Mark Bradley, footballer
  - Ross Chisholm, footballer
  - Kacey Clarke, actress
  - Tom Rosenthal, actor and comedian
- 16 January – FKA Twigs, singer/songwriter, record producer, director, and dancer
- 17 January – Will Bayley, Paralympic table tennis player
- 18 January – Ironik, musician, DJ and rapper
- 19 January – Danny Haynes, footballer
- 24 January – Jade Ewen, singer with Sugababes, songwriter, and actress
- 26 January – Mia Rose, singer/songwriter
- 30 January – Edward Abel, cricketer

=== February ===
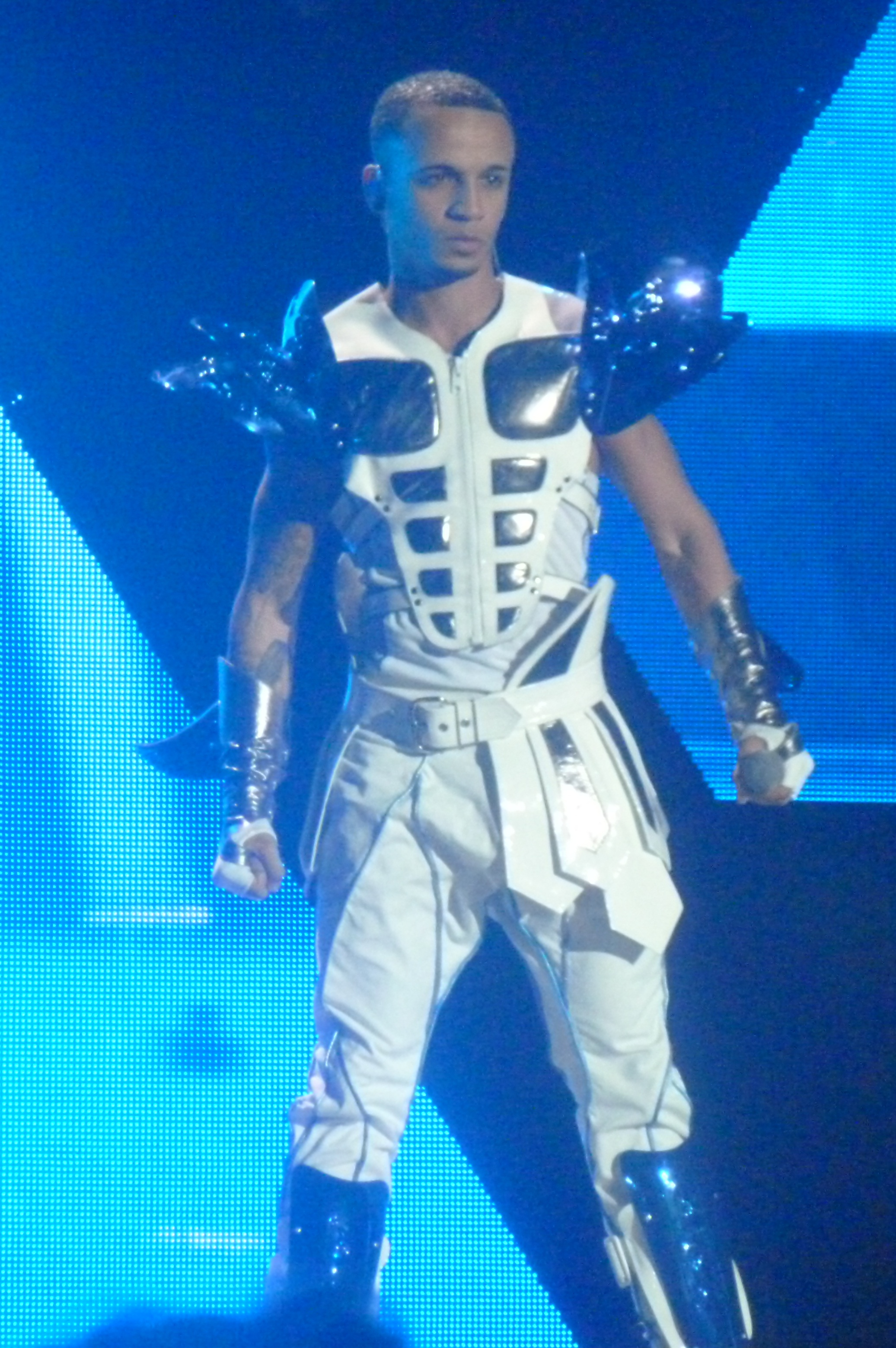
Aston Merrygold

- 2 February – Richard Beaumont, rugby league player
- 3 February – Rikki Bains, footballer
- 4 February – Jake Abbott, rugby union player
- 6 February
  - Tom Bonner, footballer
  - David McDermott, footballer (d. 2026)
- 13 February
  - Luke Cutts, Olympic pole vaulter
  - Aston Merrygold, singer and member of JLS
- 17 February – Adil Rashid, cricketer
- 18 February
  - Simon Ainge, footballer
  - The Blossom Twins, twin wrestlers
- 21 February – Edward Corrie, tennis player
- 27 February – Emily Collinge, cross country runner
- 28 February – Ben Cahn, football manager and coach
- 29 February – Hannah Mills, sports sailor

=== March ===
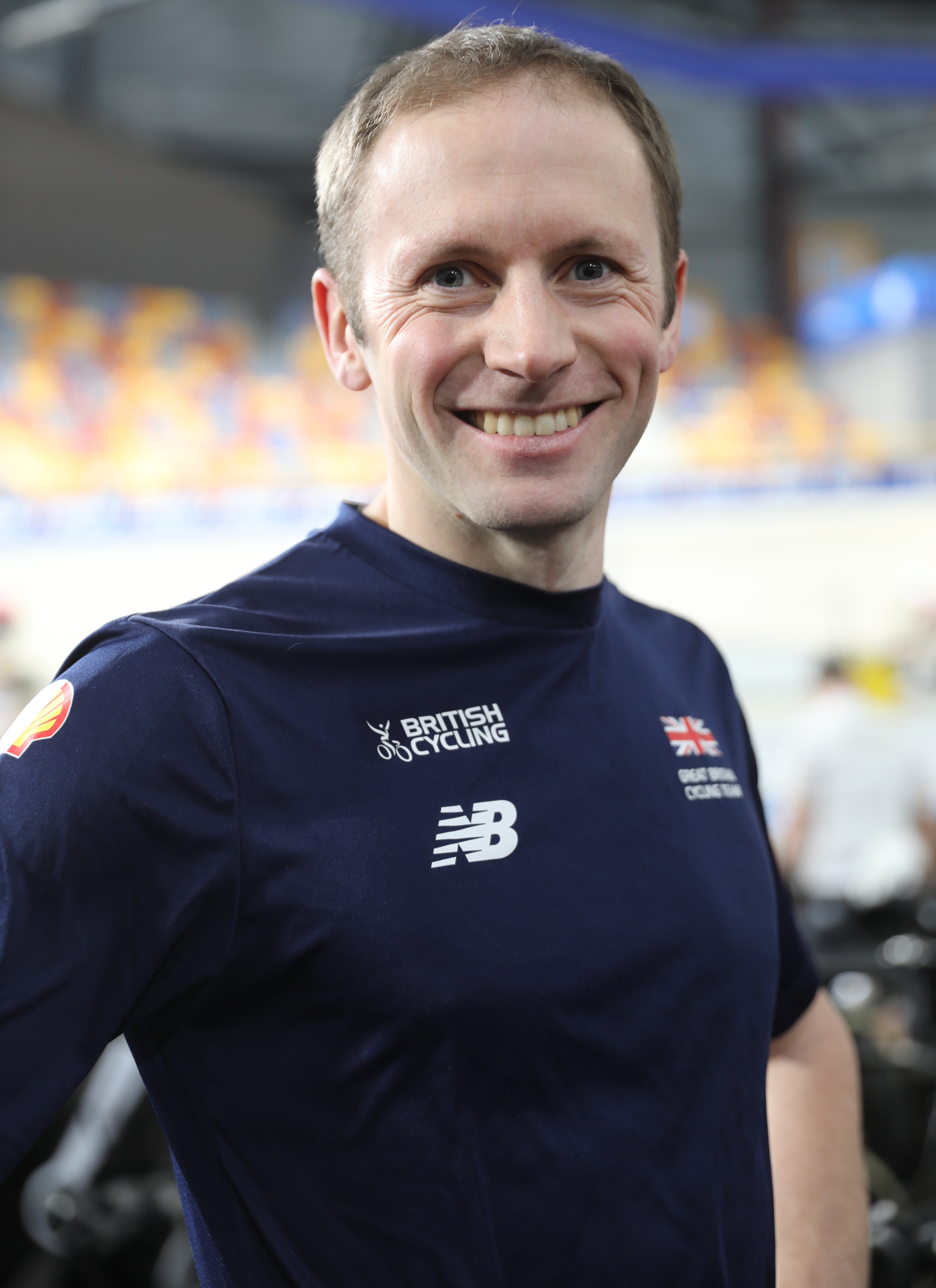
Jason Kenny

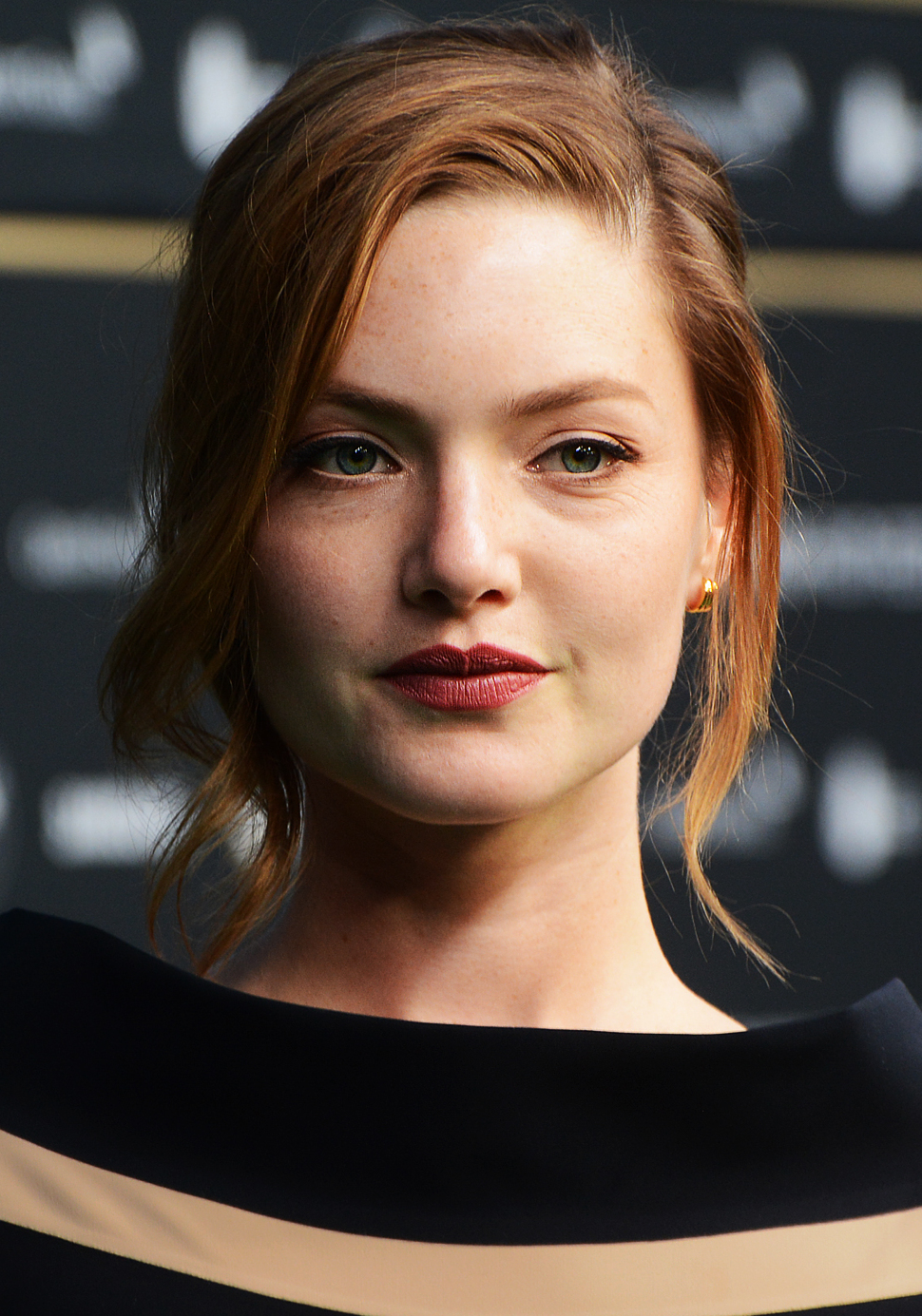
Holliday Grainger

- 1 March
  - Brian Clark, footballer
  - Jack Clarke, racing driver
- 2 March – James Arthur, singer/songwriter
- 4 March
  - Josh Bowman, actor
  - Steven Burke, Olympic cyclist
- 5 March
  - Lizzie Broughton, canoeist
  - Trevor Carson, footballer
- 6 March – Matthew Cox, rugby player
- 7 March – Sam Barlow, rugby player
- 8 March – Laura Unsworth, field hockey player
- 10 March – Ben Barker, speedway rider
- 17 March – Carrie Johnson, media consultant and activist
- 19 March – Charlie Cawood, musician and composer
- 21 March – Lee Cattermole, footballer
- 22 March
  - Kayleigh Barton, footballer
  - Gaz Beadle, television personality
- 23 March
  - Rose Anderson, basketball player
  - Jason Kenny, track cyclist
- 24 March – Finn Jones, actor
- 27 March
  - Holliday Grainger, actress
  - Jessie J, singer/songwriter
- 28 March – Lacey Turner, actress
- 31 March – Noah Cato, rugby player

=== April ===
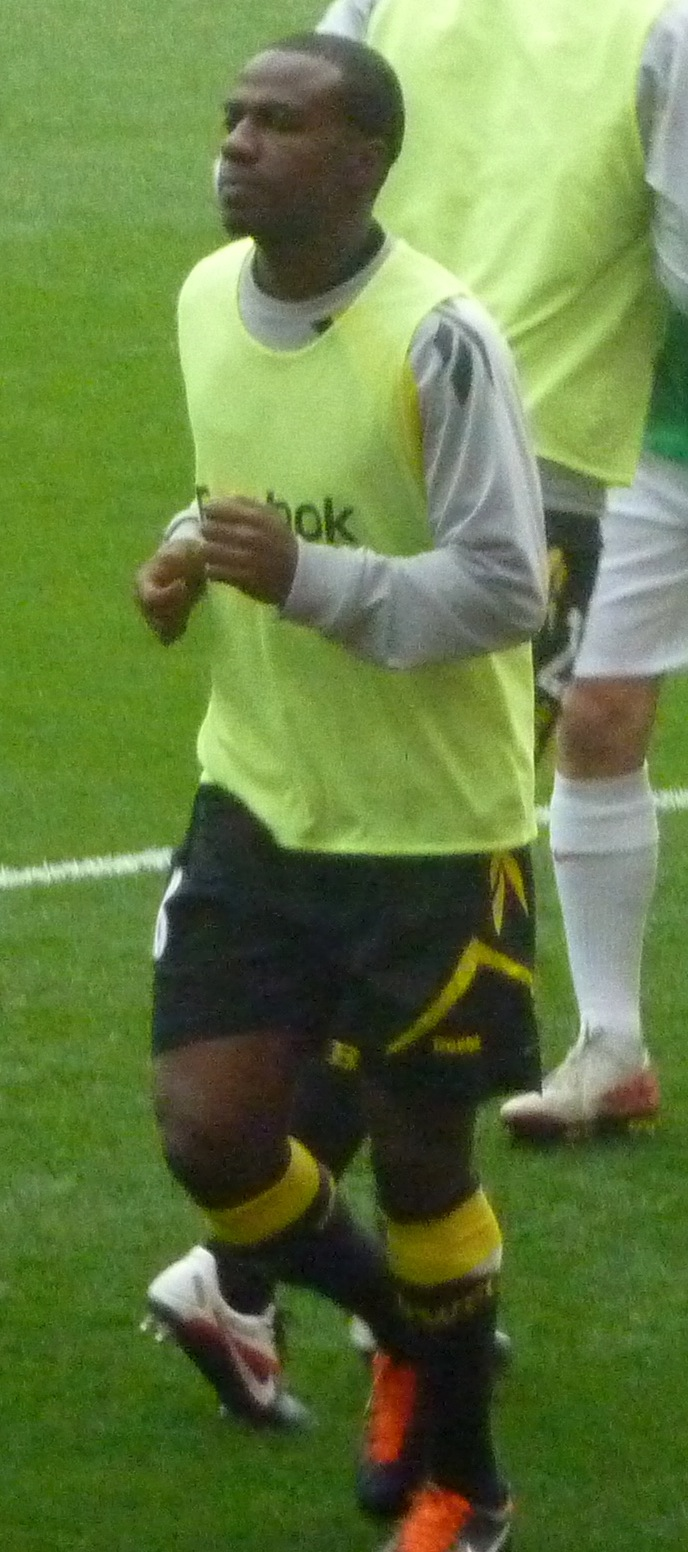
Fabrice Muamba

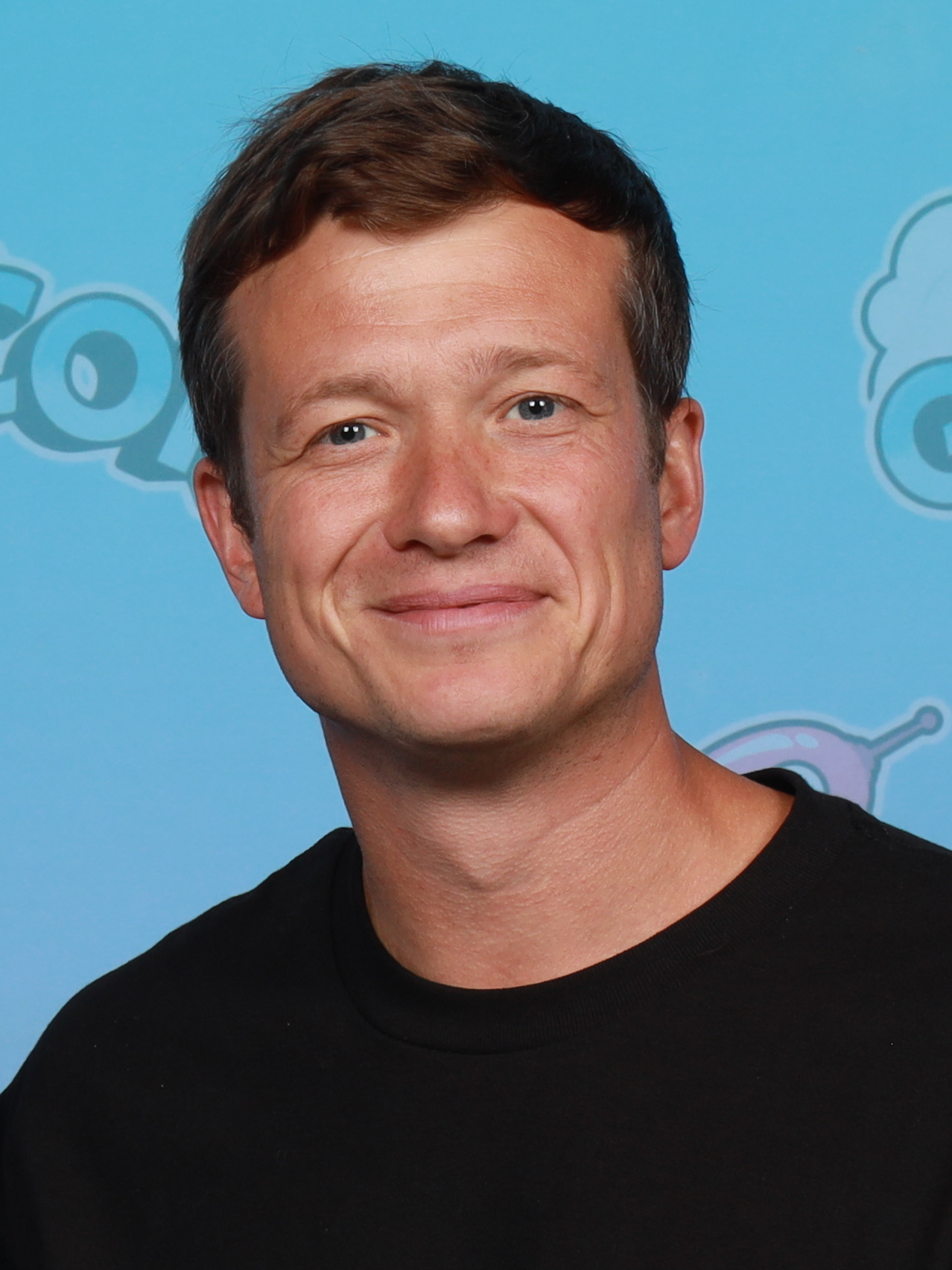
Ed Speleers

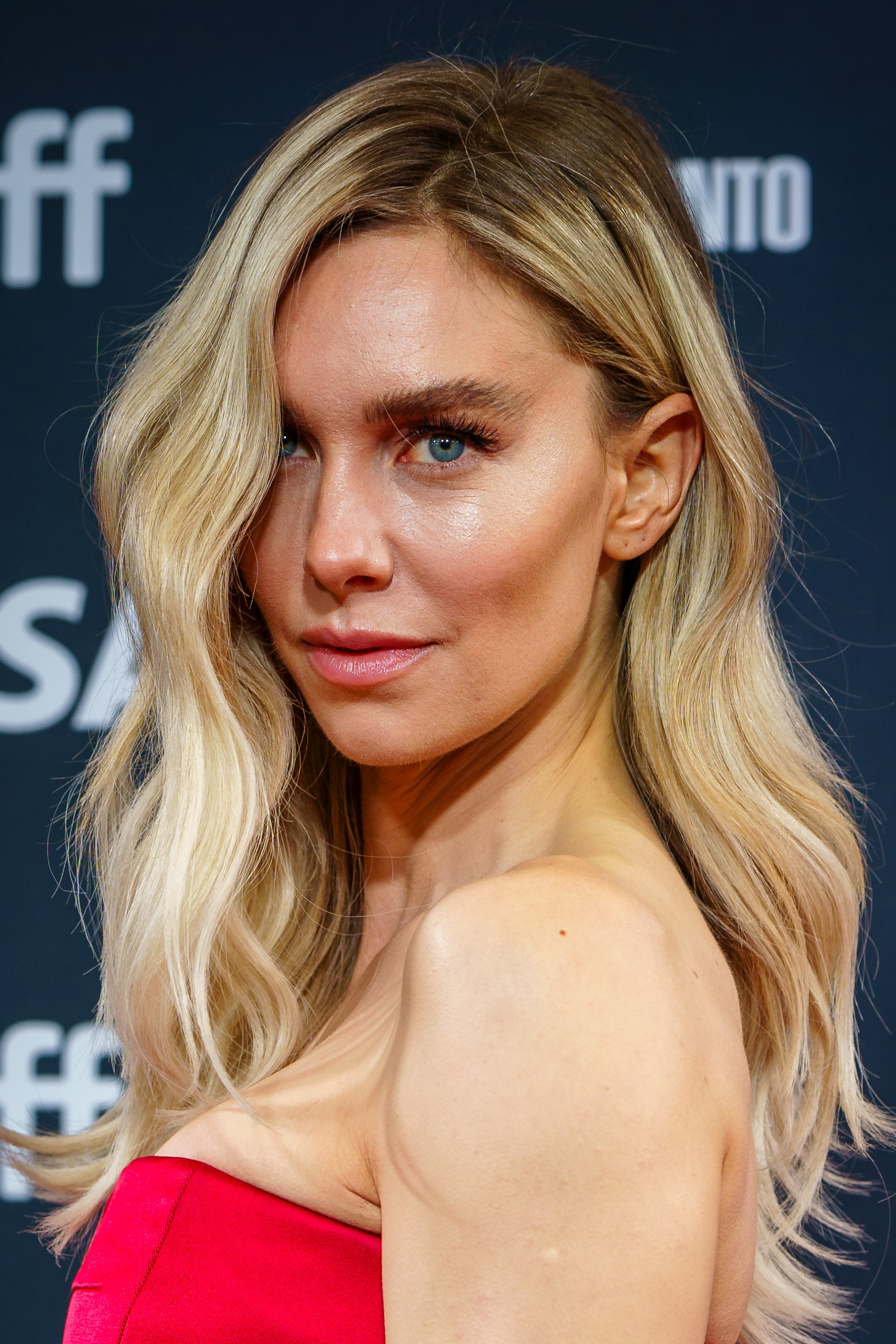
Vanessa Kirby

- 1 April
  - James Campbell, javelin thrower
  - Ed Drewett, pop singer/songwriter
- 2 April – Louis Briscoe, footballer
- 3 April
  - Ruby Bentall, actress
  - Michael Carvill, footballer
- 4 April – Michael Coulson, footballer
- 6 April
  - Mike Bailey, actor
  - Fabrice Muamba, Congolese-born footballer
- 7 April
  - Leroy Cudjoe, rugby player
  - Ed Speleers, actor
- 8 April
  - Sam Beasant, footballer
- 9 April – Amplify Dot, rapper and DJ
- 10 April
  - Danielle Brown, Paralympic archer
  - Greg Cameron, footballer
  - Emma Cattle, Paralympic swimmer
- 12 April – Stephen Brogan, footballer
- 13 April
  - Luke Barnatt, mixed martial artist
  - Will Bratt, racing driver
- 14 April – Ben Lloyd-Hughes, actor
- 18 April – Vanessa Kirby, actress
- 19 April – Paul Caddis, footballer and coach
- 21 April – Sophie Rundle, actress
- 22 April
  - John Brake, rugby player
  - Jamie Courtney, motorcycle racer
- 23 April
  - Alistair Brownlee, Olympic triathlete
  - Sasha Corbin, netball player
  - Steph Houghton, footballer
- 25 April – Jonathan Bailey, actor
- 26 April – S. E. Lister, novelist

=== May ===
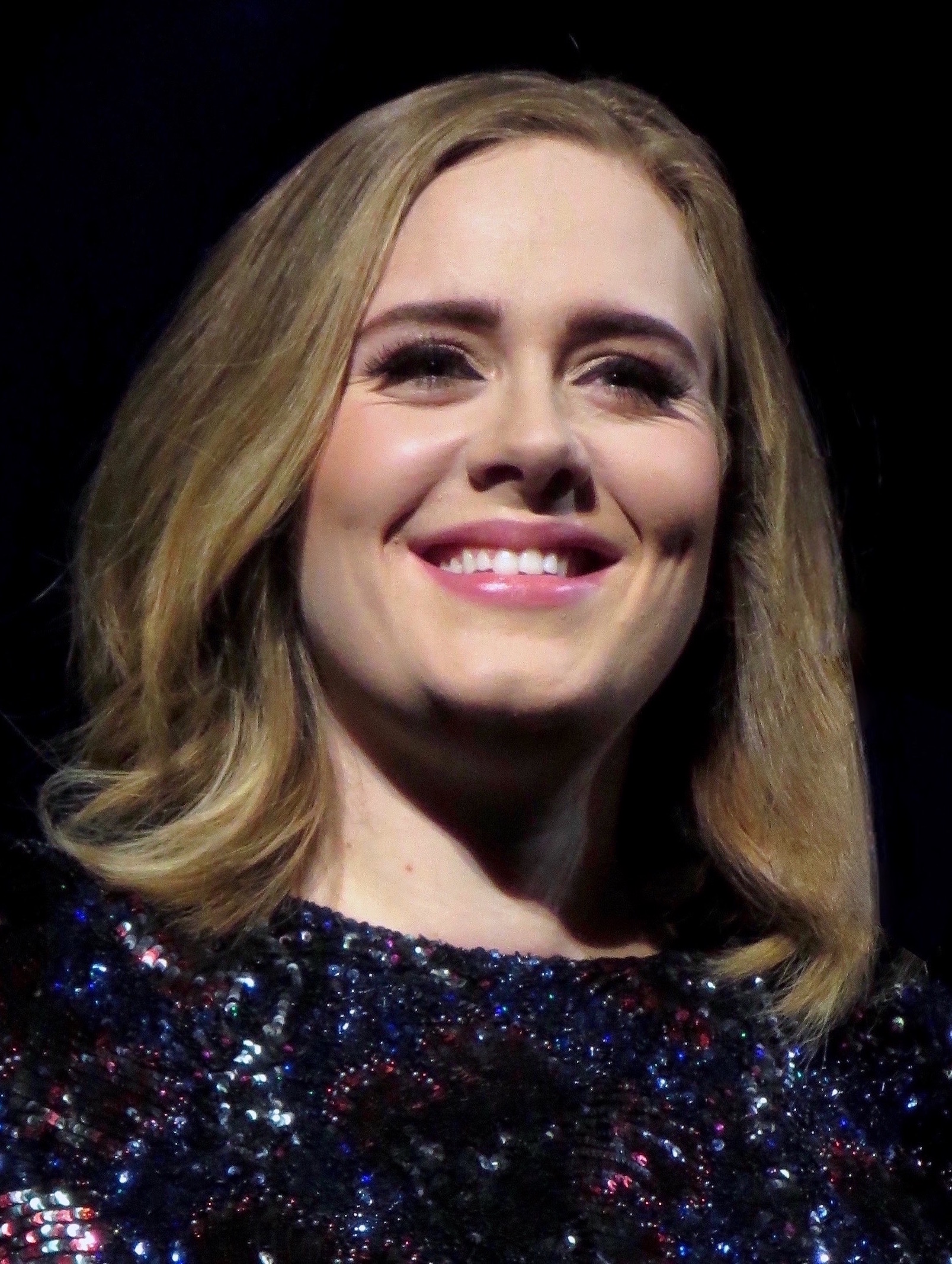
Adele

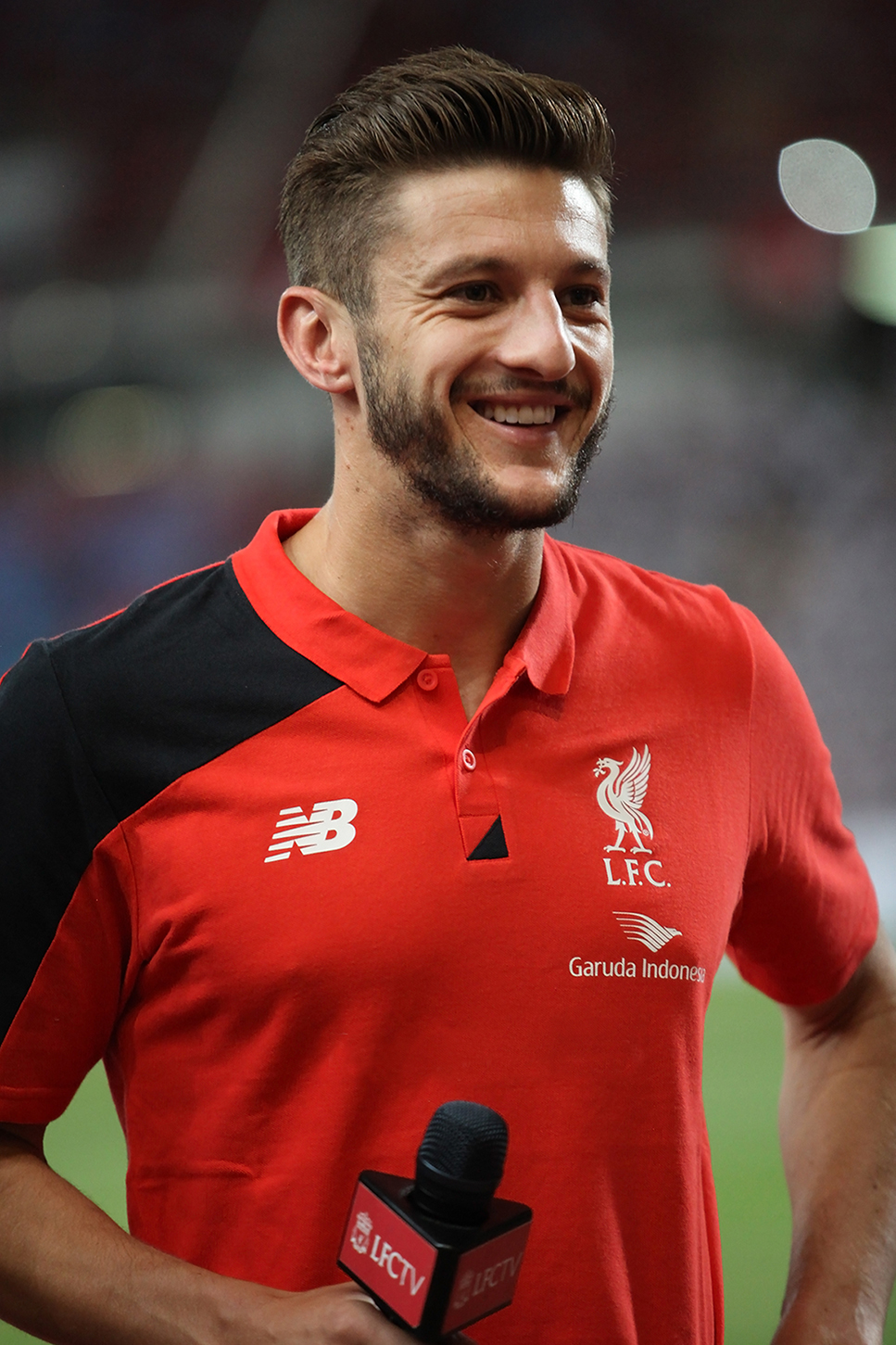
Adam Lallana

- 4 May – Lewis Calder, rugby player
- 5 May – Adele, singer/songwriter
- 6 May – James Brown, rugby player
- 9 May – Jillie Cooper, badminton player
- 10 May
  - Thomas Coyle, rugby player
  - Adam Lallana, footballer
- 11 May – Miles Benjamin, rugby player
- 15 May – Marcus Collins, singer
- 17 May
  - Karl Brown, cricketer
  - Freddie Hogan, actor
- 20 May – Scott Askham, mixed martial artist
- 21 May – Claire Cashmore, Paralympic swimmer
- 22 May – Joe Coffey, wrestler
- 23 May
  - Ian Cameron, footballer
  - Gavin Free, cinematographer
- 24 May – Paul Borrington, cricketer
- 27 May – Jonathan Broom-Edwards, Paralympic high jumper
- 30 May – Bradley Bubb, footballer

=== June ===
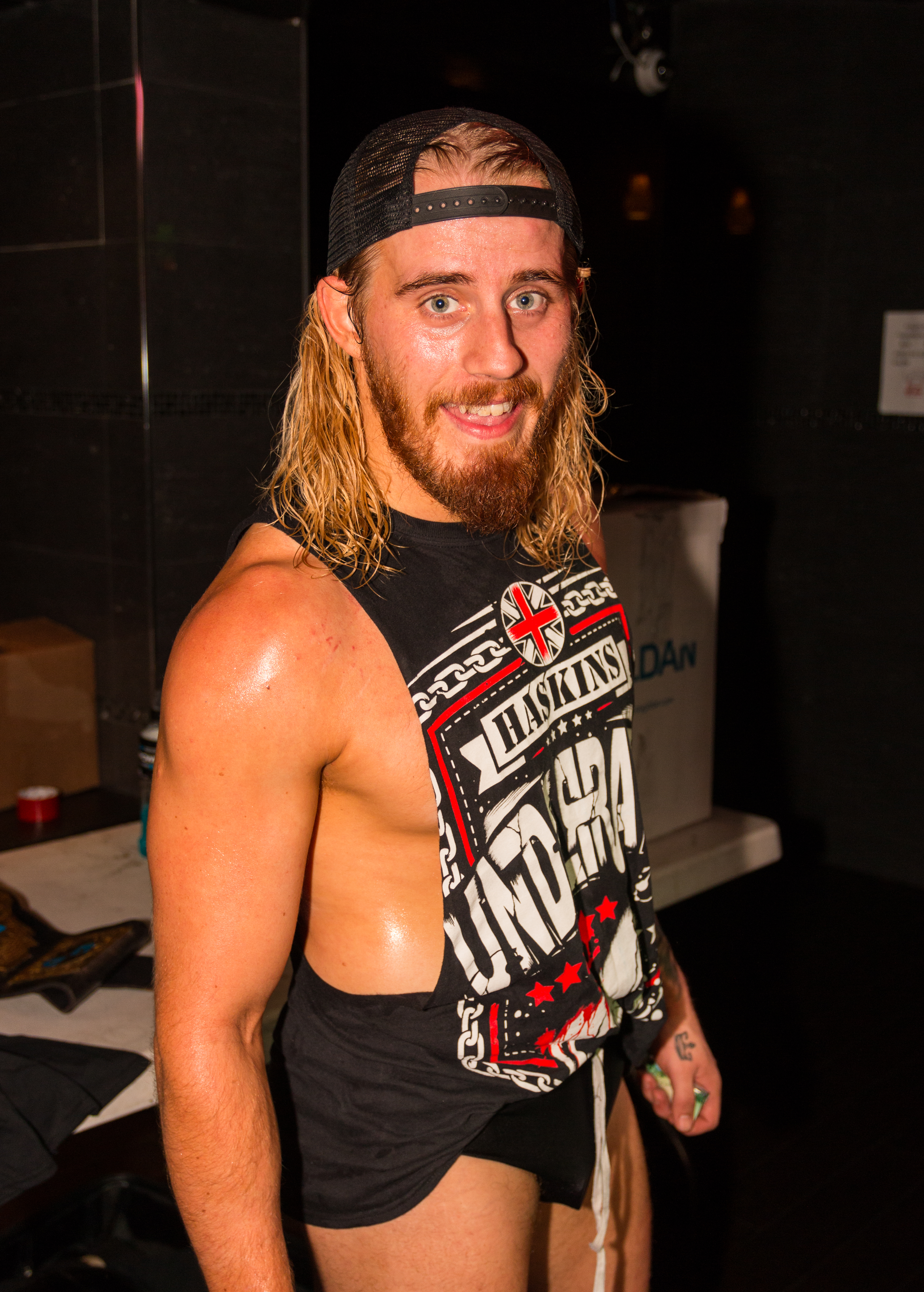
Mark Haskins

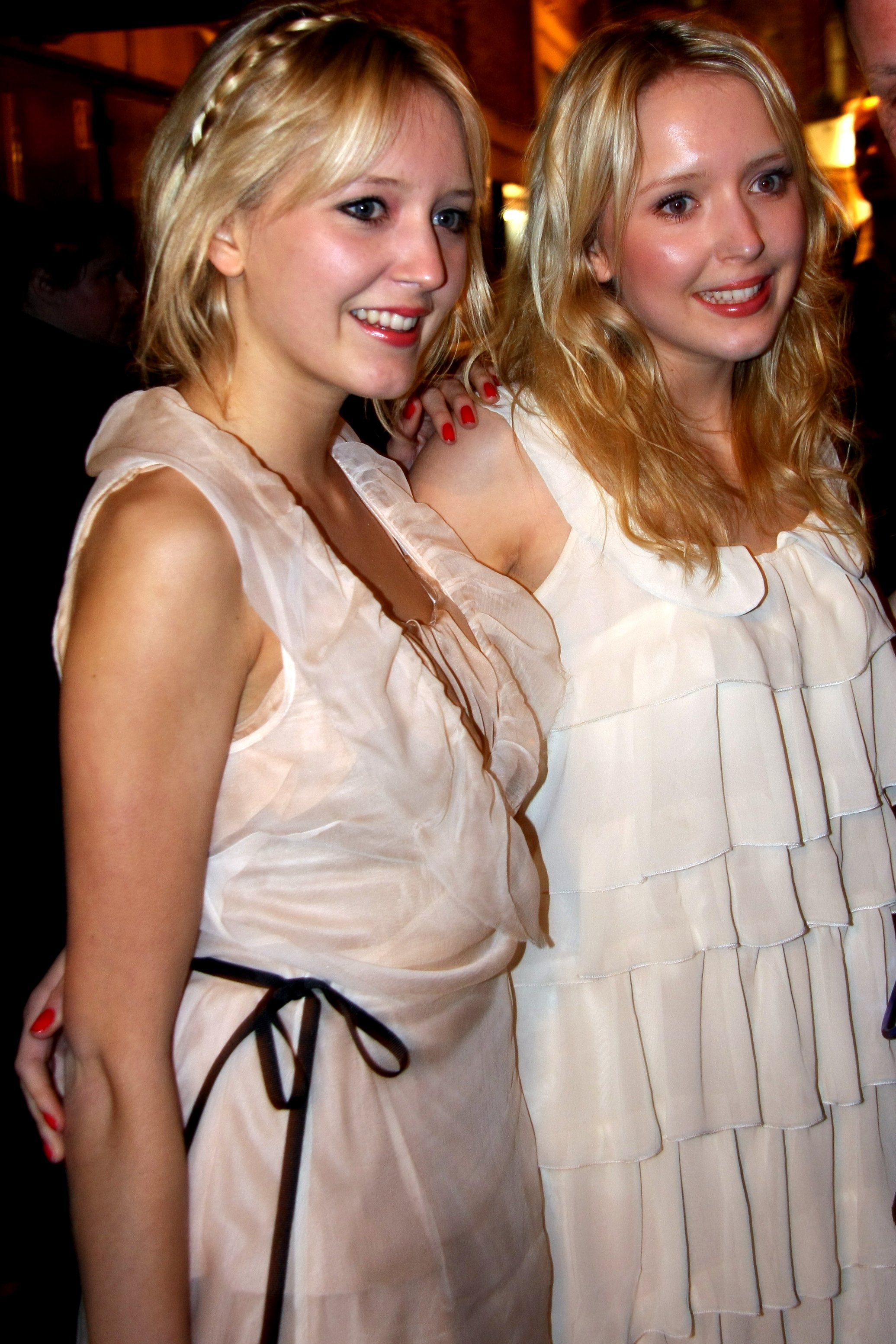
Samanda

- 2 June – Axel Blake, comedian
- 3 June – Oliver Cheshire, fashion designer, model, and entrepreneur
- 5 June – Sam Slocombe, footballer
- 7 June – Lewis Coult, footballer
- 10 June – Samantha Bayley, gymnast
- 12 June – JHart, English-born American singer/songwriter and record producer
- 15 June – Jack Broadbent, blues musician
- 17 June – Sam Baird, snooker player
- 18 June – Alaa al-Siddiq, Emirati-born poet (d. 2021)
- 20 June – Shefali Chowdhury, actress
- 22 June
  - Daniel Awde, Olympic decathlete
  - Laura Bartlett, field hockey player
  - Karla Crome, actress and writer
- 23 June
  - Brian Allison, footballer
  - Bobby Barr, footballer
  - Kev Coghlan, motorcycle racer
- 24 June
  - Michael Barnes, footballer
  - Micah Richards, footballer and pundit
- 25 June – Mark Haskins, wrestler
- 26 June
  - Scott Carpenter, British-born Australian water polo player
  - Samanda (Amanda and Samantha Marchant), twin acting duo
- 28 June
  - Leon Balogun, footballer
  - Craig Braham-Barrett, footballer

=== July ===
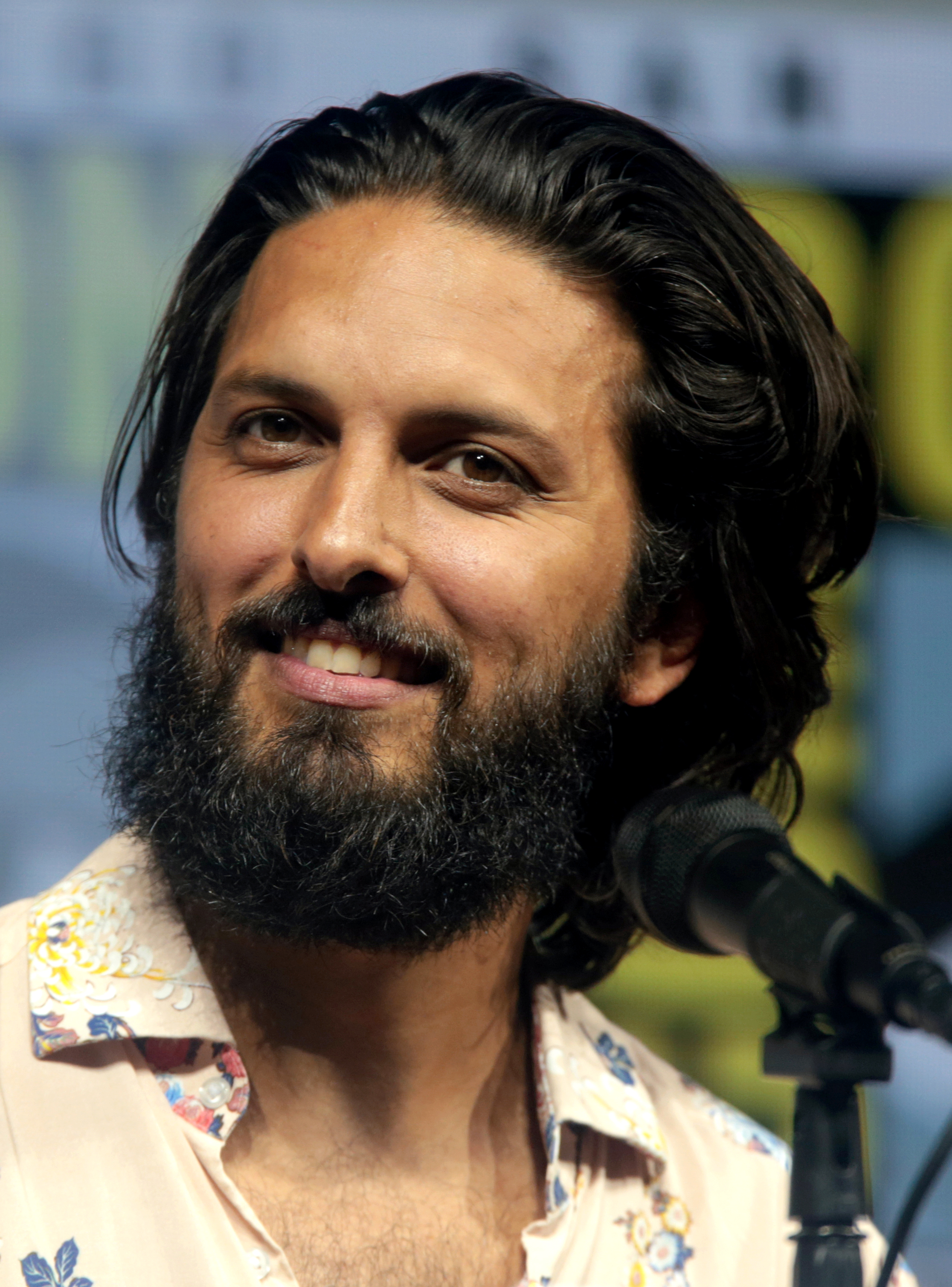
Shazad Latif

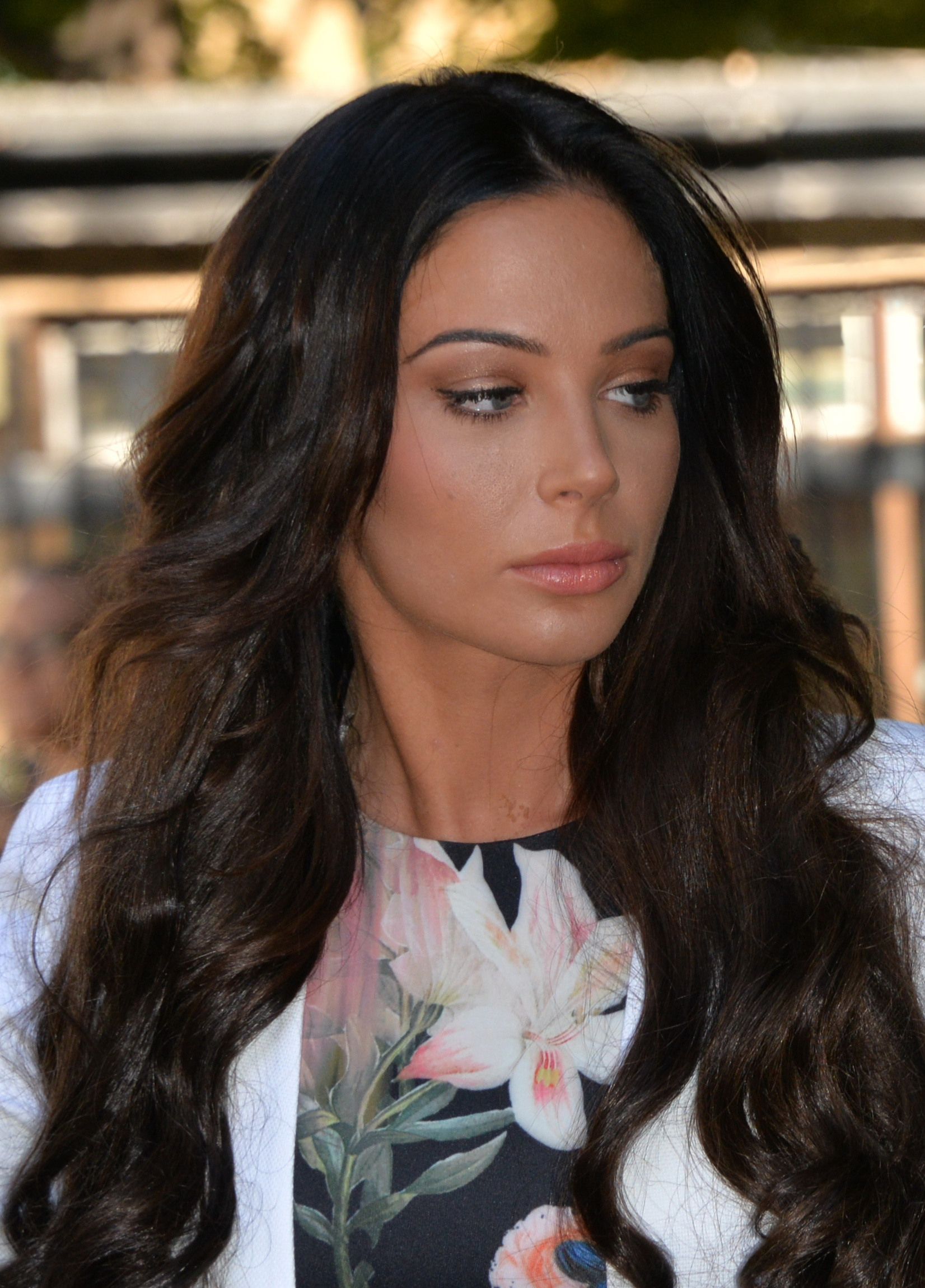
Tulisa

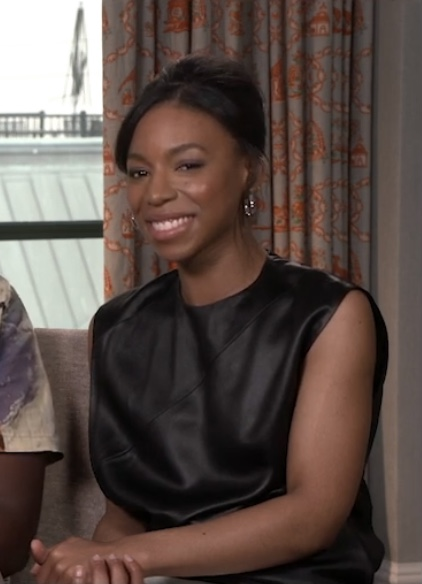
Pippa Bennett-Warner

- 1 July – Phil Burgess, rugby player
- 2 July – Edward Randell, musician and actor
- 3 July – Akbar Ansari, cricketer
- 4 July
  - Jake Cody, poker player
  - Conor MacNeill, actor
- 5 July – Joe Lycett, comedian and presenter
- 7 July – Jack Whitehall, comedian
- 8 July – Shazad Latif, actor
- 9 July – Brett Carter, rugby player
- 11 July
  - James Castle, wrestler (d. 2024)
  - Eddie Charlton, squash player
- 12 July – Scott Baldwin, rugby player
- 13 July
  - Luke Blakely, English-born Antiguan footballer
  - Jonnie Craig, photographer
  - Tulisa, recording artist
- 14 July – Jethro Compton, playwright
- 15 July
  - Korede Aiyegbusi, footballer
  - Riki Christodoulou, racing driver
- 17 July – Alan Cope, cricketer
- 19 July – Joe Tracini, actor and presenter
- 20 July – Chris Basham, footballer
- 21 July – Rory Boulding, footballer
- 22 July
  - William Buick, Norwegian-born jockey
  - Paul Coutts, footballer
- 23 July
  - Paul Anderson, footballer
  - Stuart Baggs, businessman and entrepreneur (d. 2015)
  - Pippa Bennett-Warner, actress
- 27 July – Liam Smith, boxer
- 29 July – Adam Buckingham, gymnast

=== August ===
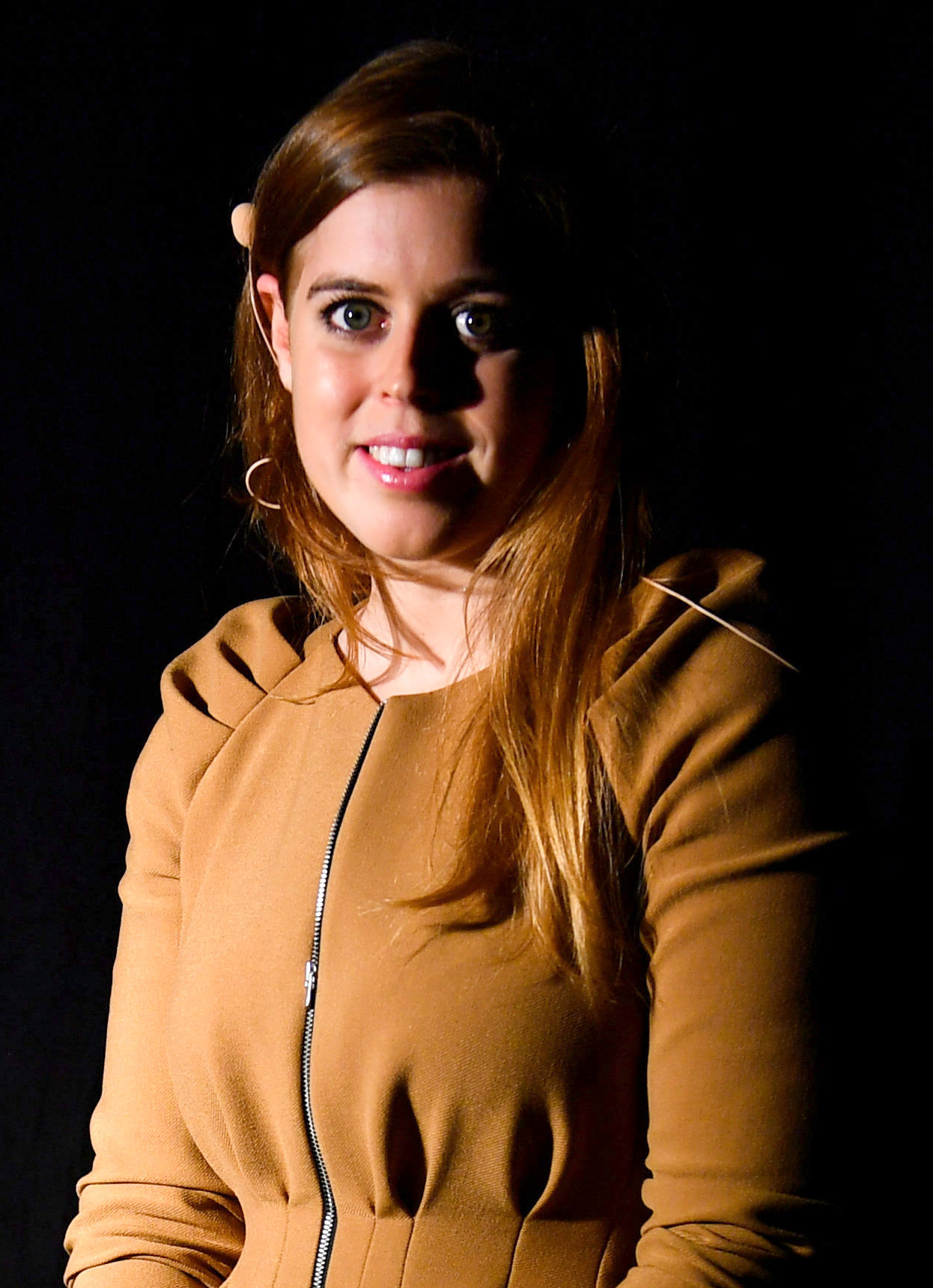
Princess Beatrice

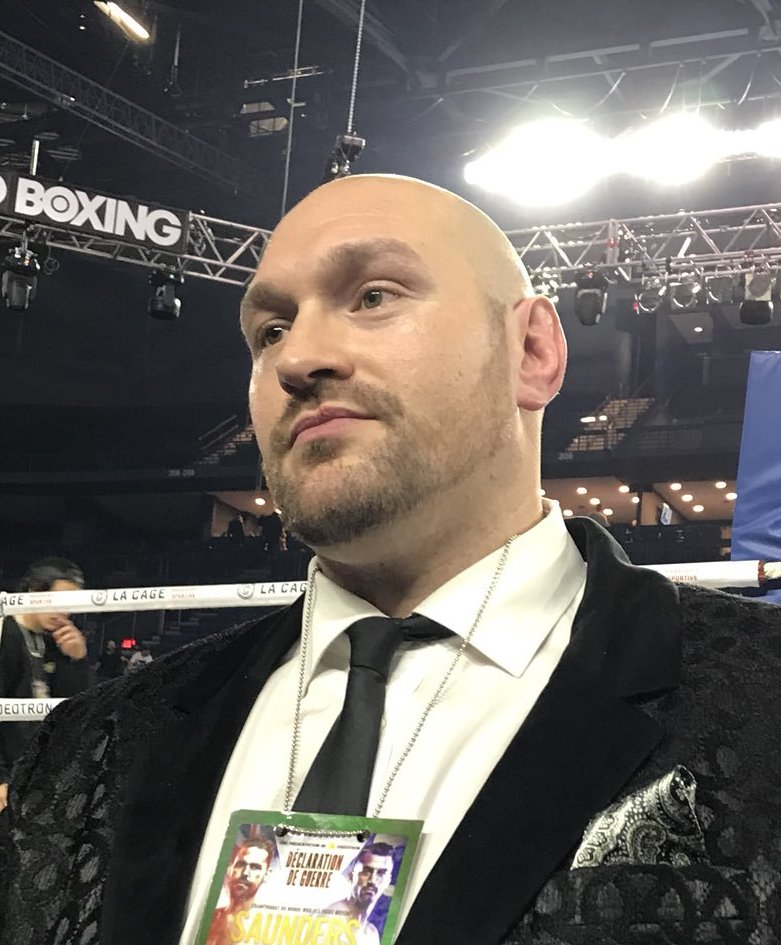
Tyson Fury

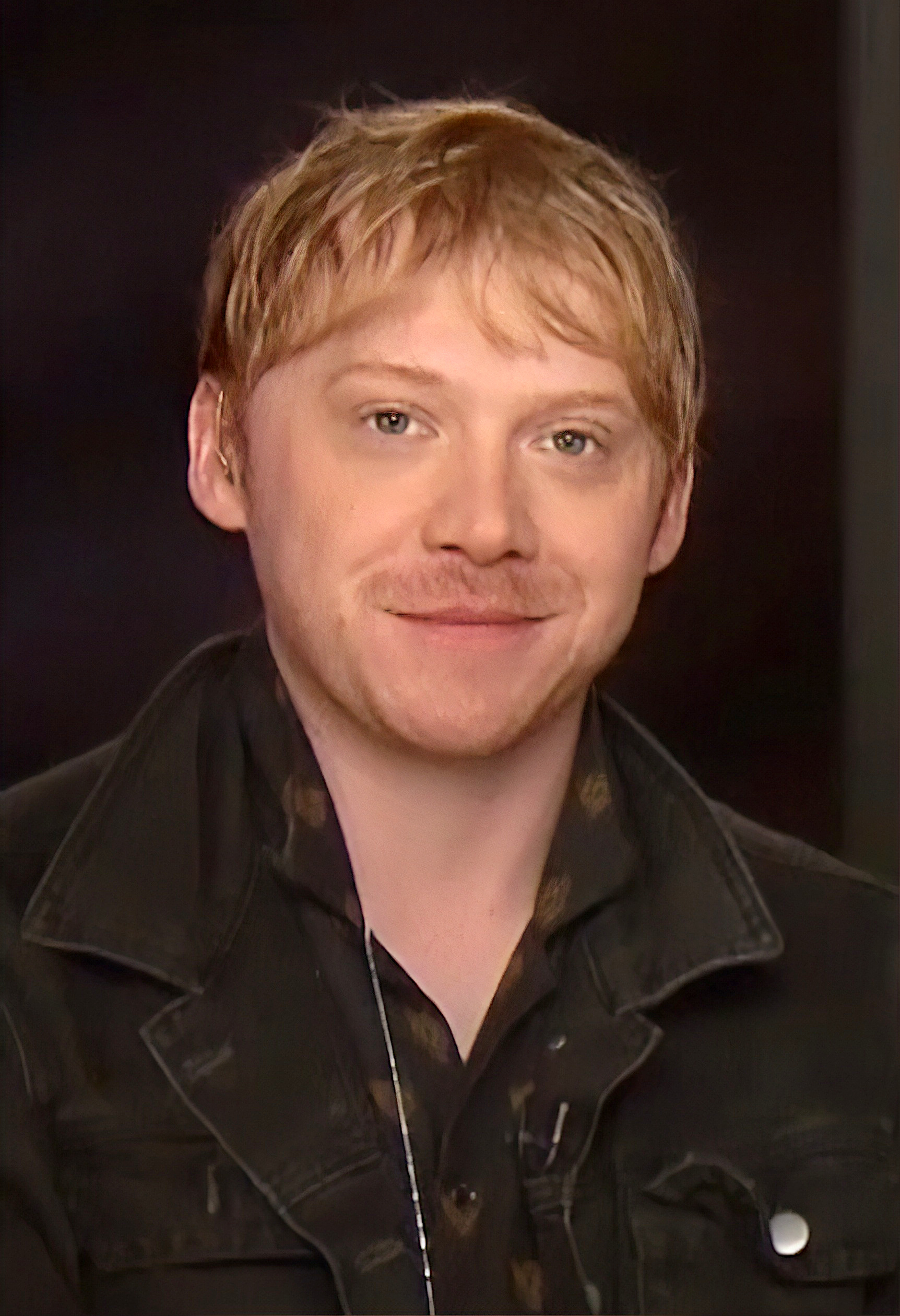
Rupert Grint

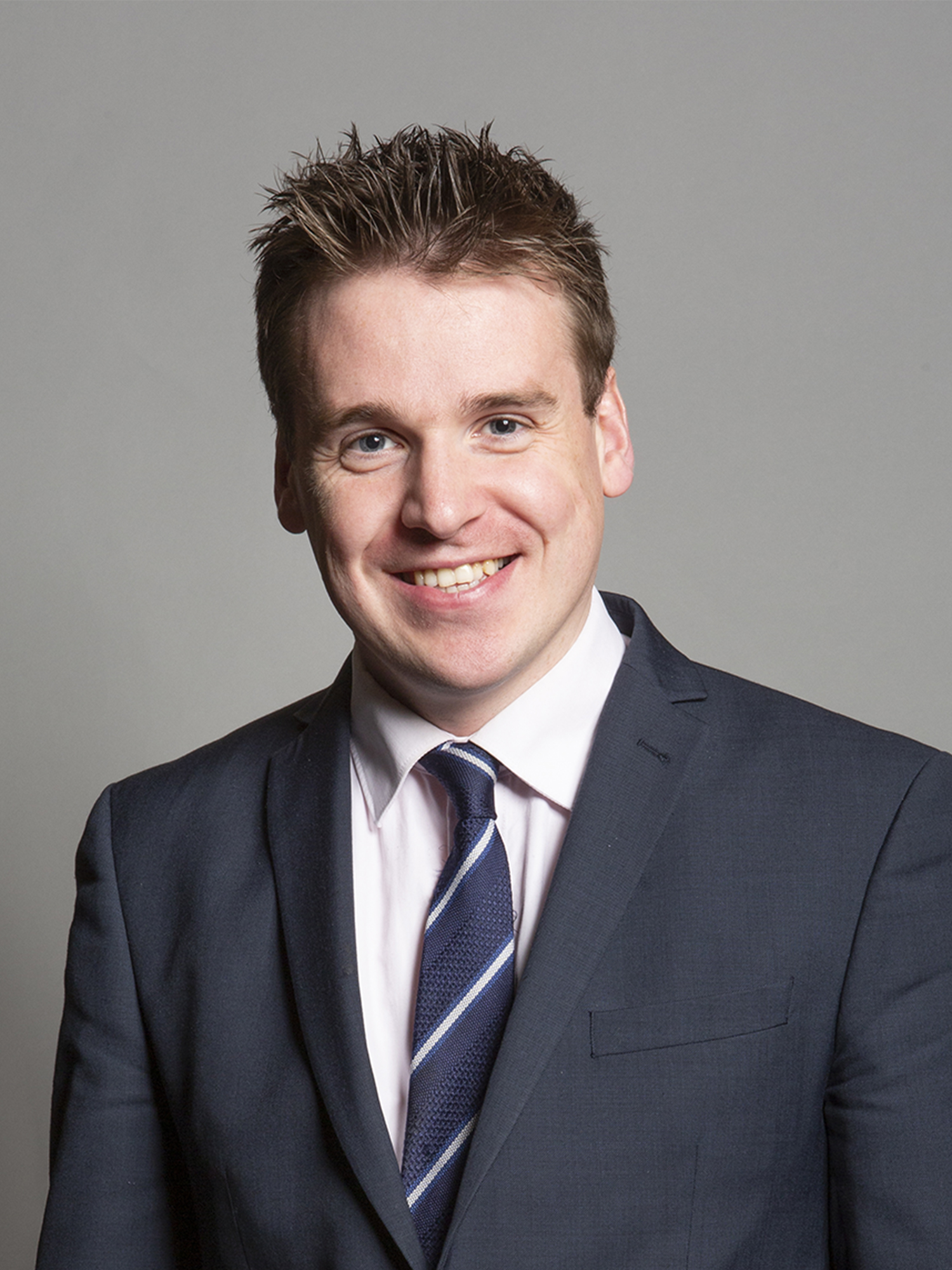
Tom Hunt

- 2 August
  - Philip Ashton, cricketer
  - Joe Copcutt, bassist for ZOAX and AxeWound
  - Chris Quick, editor and producer
- 3 August – Michael Balac, cricketer
- 4 August – Tom Parker, singer (d. 2022)
- 5 August
  - Giles Barnes, footballer
  - Andrew Cave-Brown, footballer
- 6 August
  - Wayne Brown, footballer
  - Freddie Cowan, musician, songwriter, and guitarist
- 8 August
  - Laura Beveridge, golfer
  - Princess Beatrice, daughter of The Duke and Duchess of York
- 9 August
  - Tommy Bridewell, racing driver
- 11 August – Rachael Cairns, actress and model
- 12 August – Tyson Fury, boxer
- 16 August
  - Tomi Ameobi, footballer
  - James Cole, racing driver
- 21 August – Kenny Adamson, footballer
- 22 August – Hannah Beard, footballer
- 24 August – Rupert Grint, actor
- 25 August
  - Alexandra Burke, singer
  - Ray Quinn, singer and actor
- 27 August – Andy Carter, cricketer
- 29 August – Harry Aikines-Aryeetey, Olympic sprinter
- 30 August
  - Lewis Christie, ice hockey player
  - Alex Corbisiero, rugby player
- 31 August
  - Dolly Alderton, author and screenwriter
  - Sofia Barclay, actress
  - Tom Hunt, politician

=== September ===
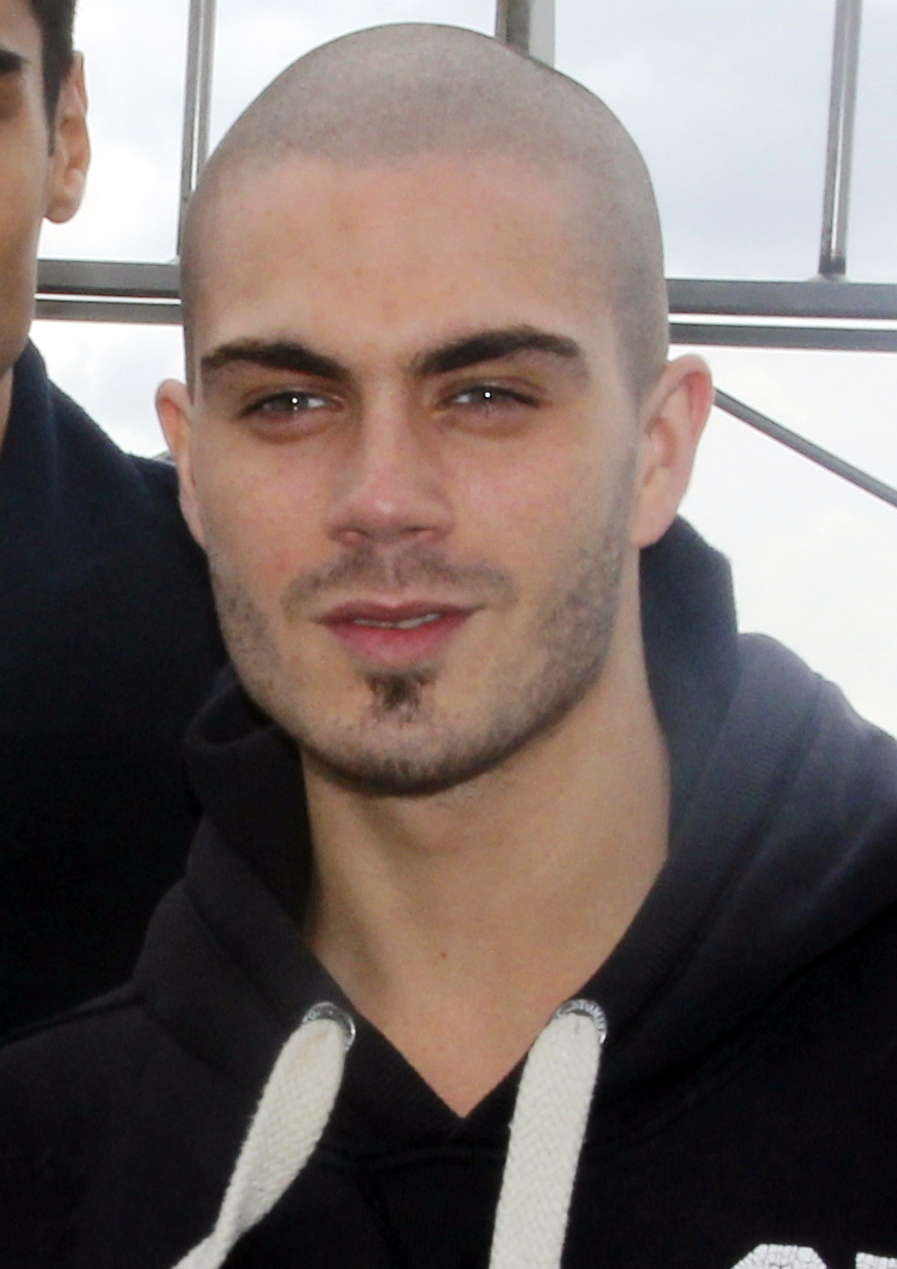
Max George

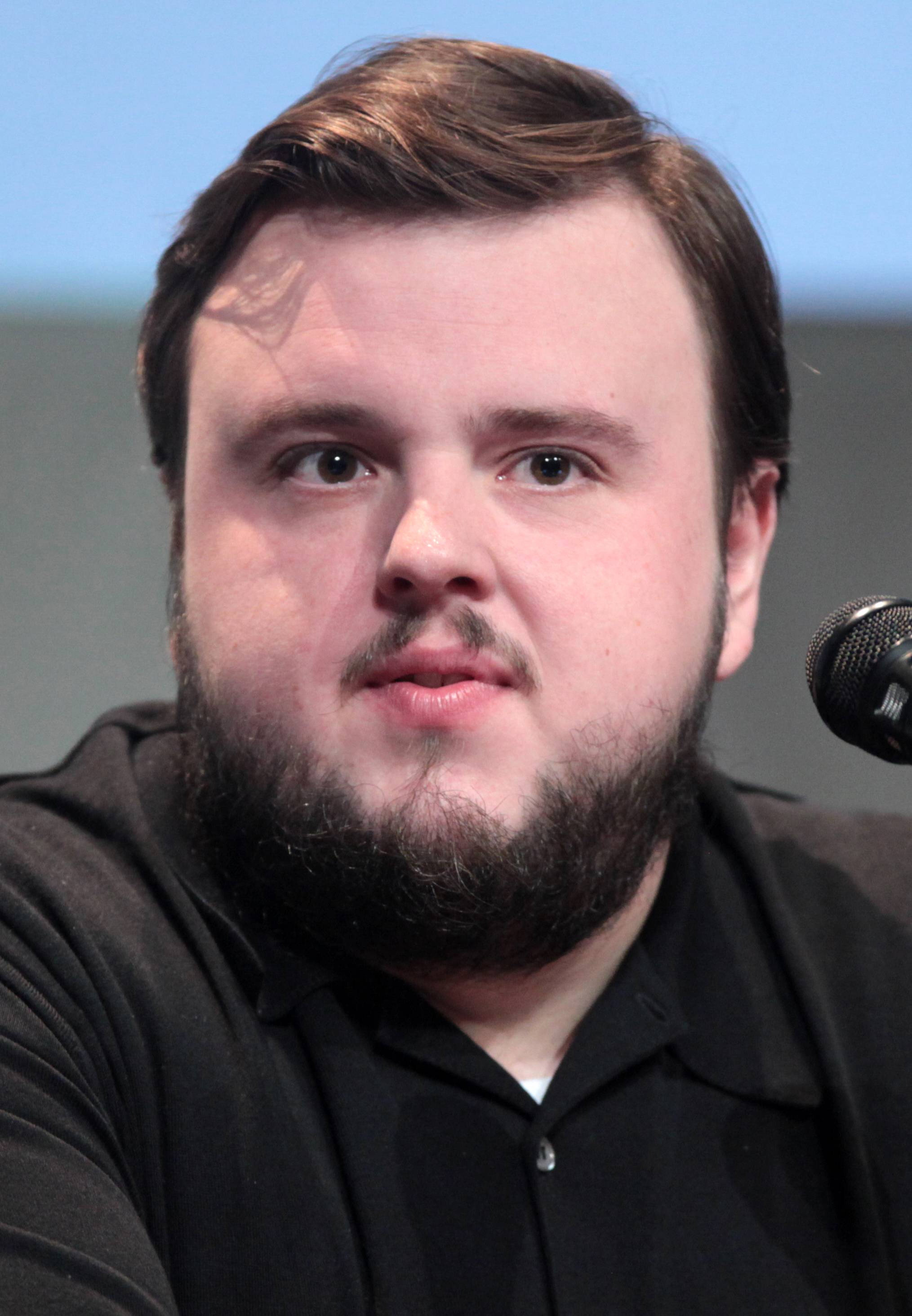
John Bradley

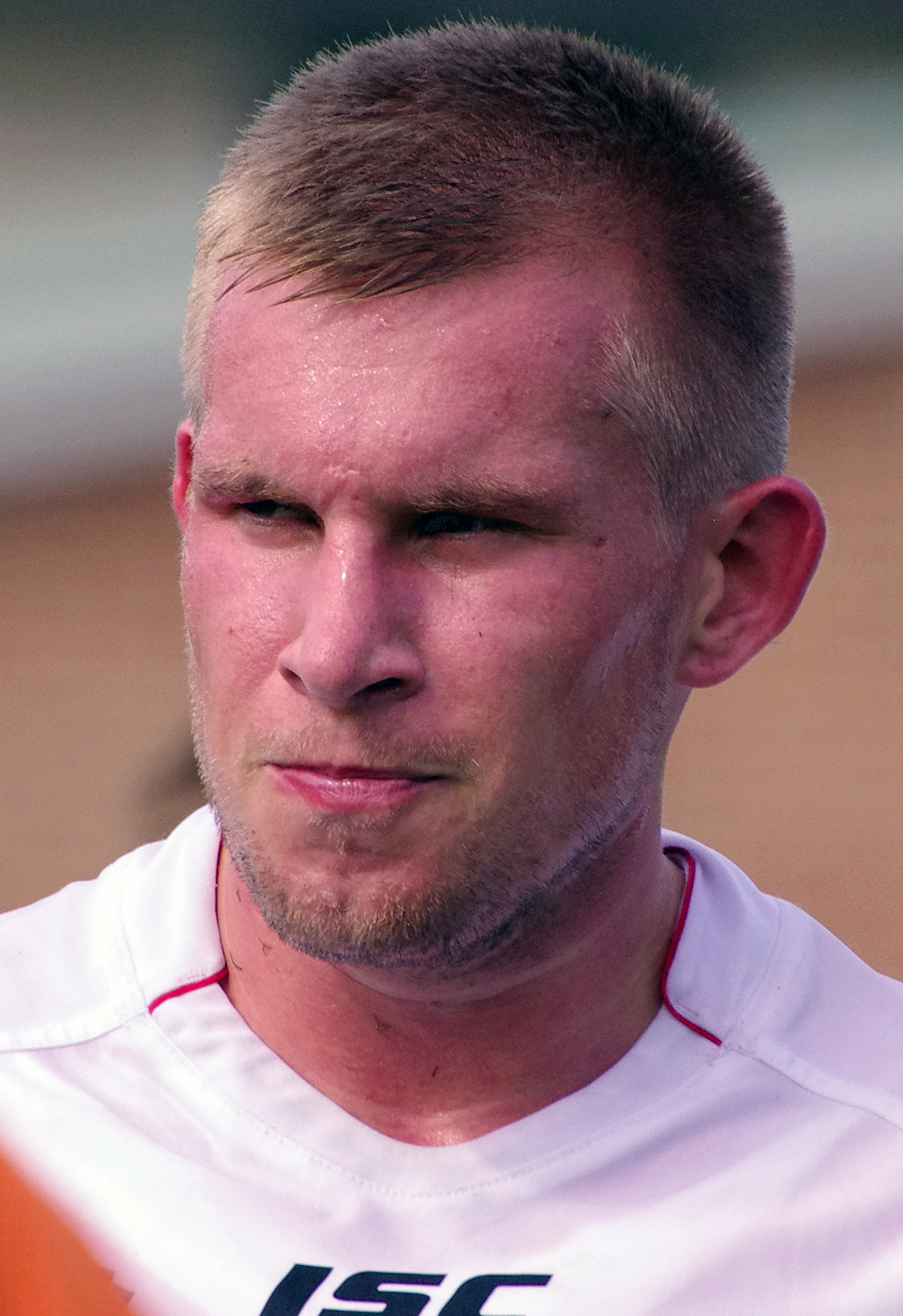
Michael Cooper

- 1 September – Richard Coughtrie, cricketer
- 2 September – Jack Compton, footballer
- 3 September – Lauren Benton, activist and founder of BODY Charity
- 4 September – James Bennett, footballer
- 6 September
  - Luis Cumbers, footballer
  - Max George, singer
- 7 September
  - Kevin Bryce, rugby player
  - Mark Cook, footballer
  - Jack Crawford, British-born American football player
- 9 September – Gareth Allen, snooker player
- 11 September – Jamie Clarke, footballer
- 12 September – Kirsty Barr, Olympic trap shooter
- 13 September – Sam Beeton, singer/songwriter
- 14 September
  - Tommy Amphlett, footballer
  - Michael Burn, footballer
  - Hosea Burton, boxer
- 15 September
  - John Bradley, English actor
  - Michael Cooper, rugby league player
  - Clare Maguire, singer/songwriter
- 17 September
  - Stephen Chukwumah, Nigerian-born advocate and strategist
  - Ryan Crowther, footballer
- 18 September – James Bailey, footballer
- 19 September – Charlie Barnett, footballer
- 21 September – Neil Carroll, footballer
- 22 September – Dami Bakare, Nigerian-born volleyball player
- 23 September
  - Don Armand, Zimbabwean-born rugby player
  - Samuel Brooksworth, businessman and Founder and Chief Executive Officer of Remoteli
- 24 September – James Cannon, rugby player
- 26 September – James Blake, singer/songwriter and record producer
- 27 September
  - Frankie Artus, footballer
  - Sam Craven, footballer
- 28 September – Lee Collins, footballer (d. 2021)

=== October ===
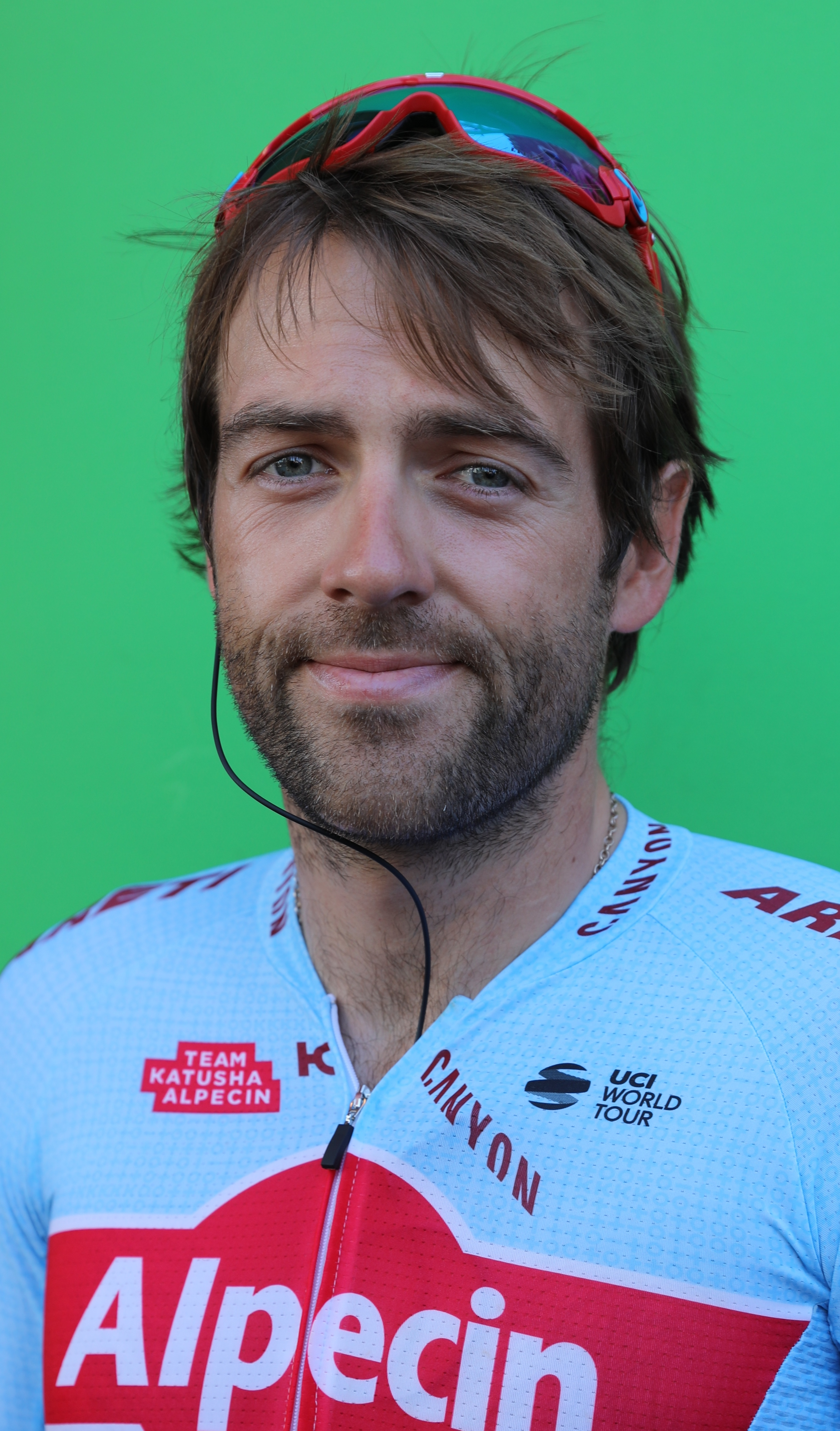
Alex Dowsett

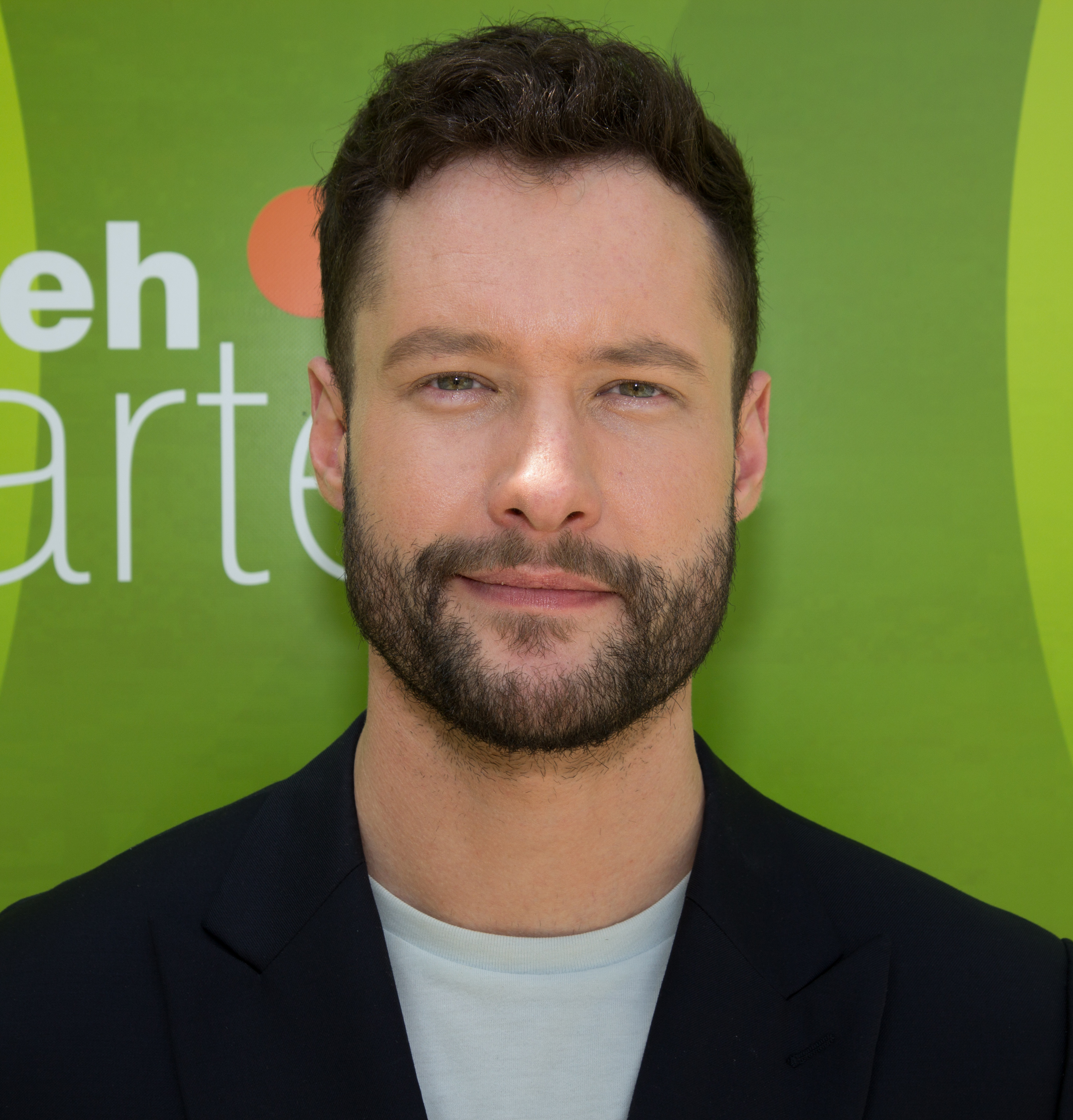
Calum Scott

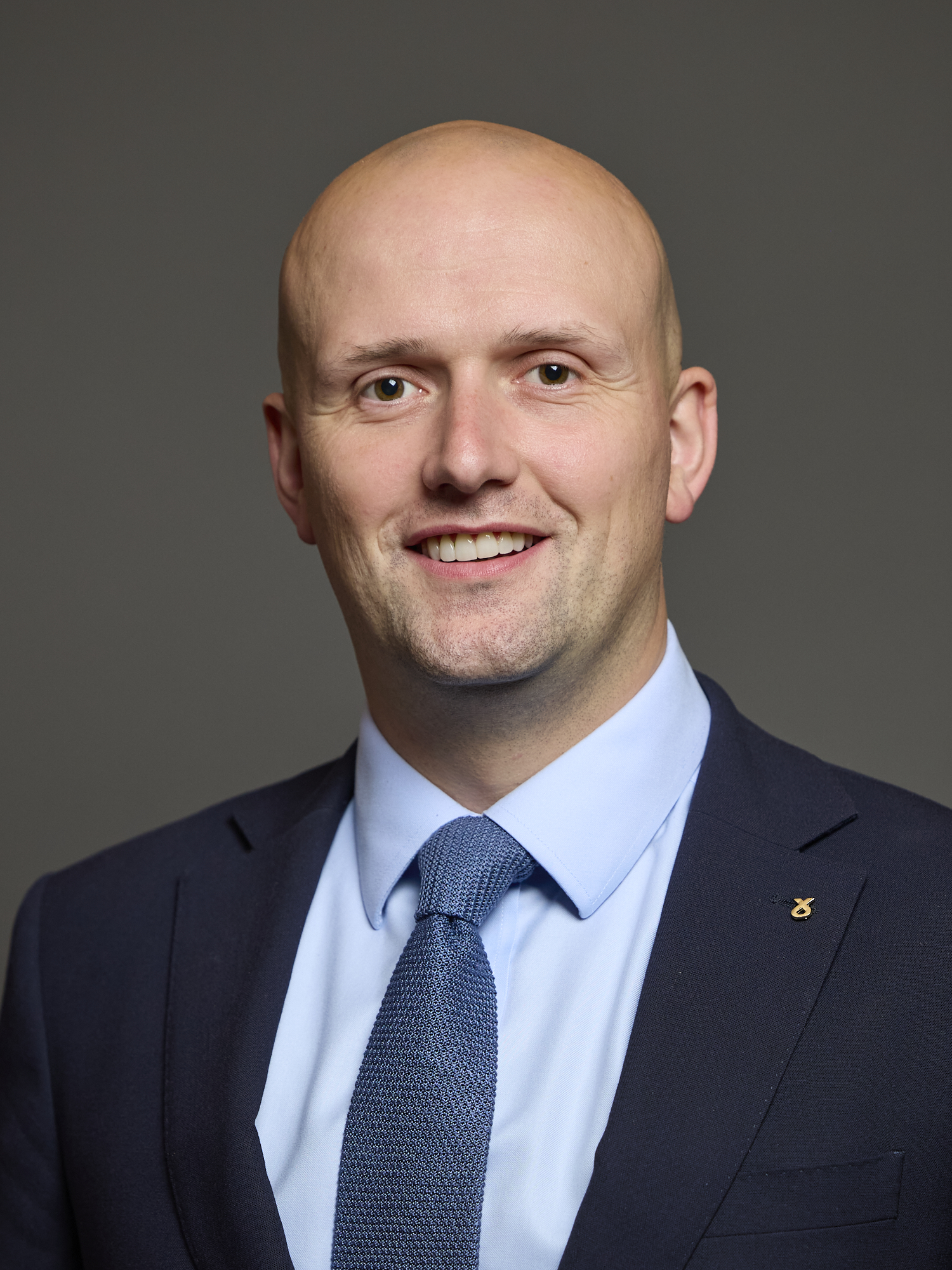
Stephen Flynn

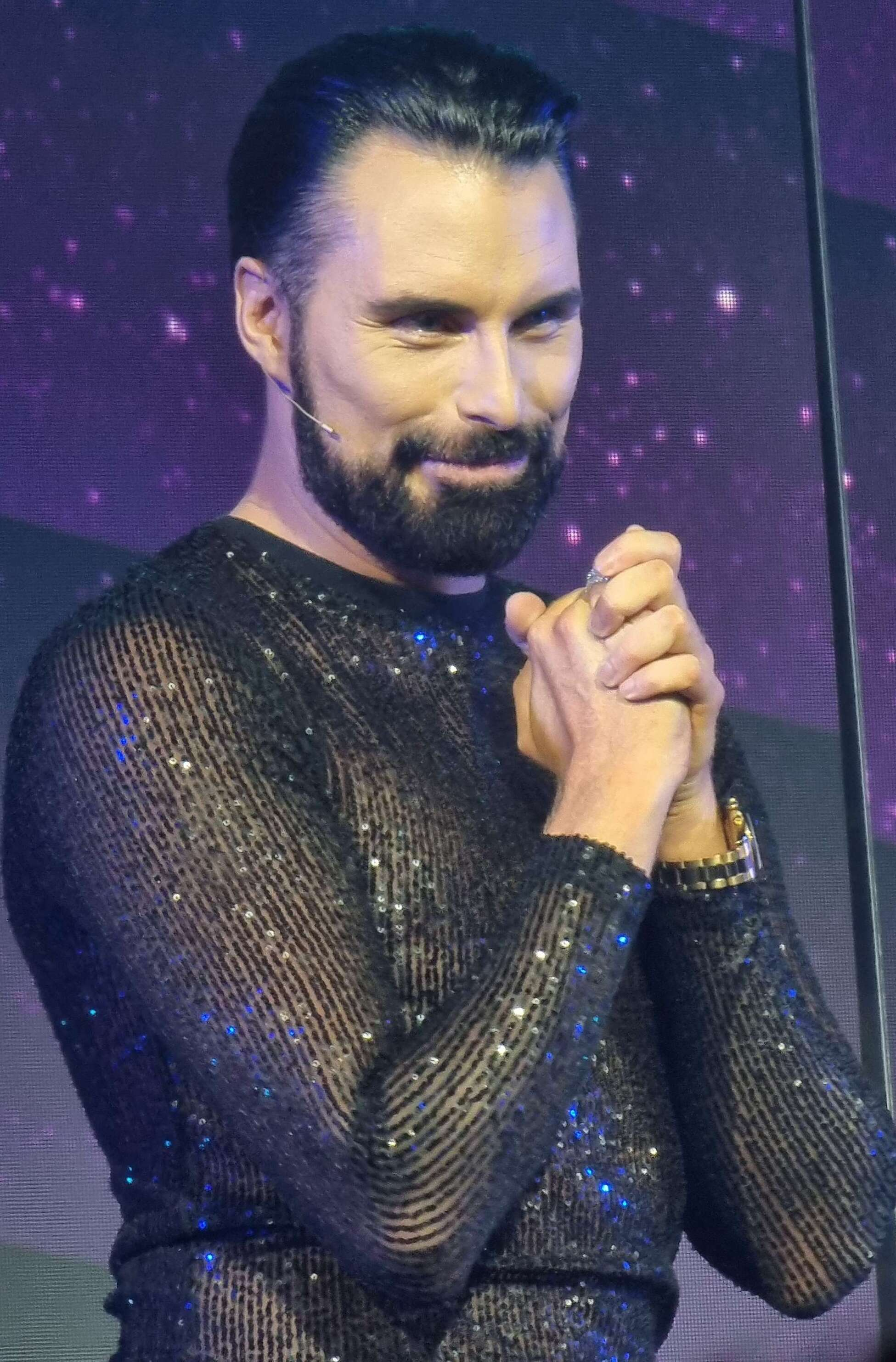
Rylan Clark

- 2 October
  - Matthew Cassidy, footballer
  - Jack Collison, footballer, coach, and manager
- 3 October
  - Gavin Baker, cricketer
  - Alex Dowsett, racing cyclist
- 4 October
  - Charlotte Awbery, singer/songwriter
  - Ashley Banjo, choreographer
- 6 October – Mike Burnett, rugby player
- 8 October – Will Beer, cricketer
- 10 October – Amy Bagshaw, gymnast
- 11 October
  - Lee Butcher, footballer
  - Alex Campana, footballer
- 12 October
  - Wes Baynes, footballer
  - Ryan Burge, footballer
  - Nic Cudd, rugby player
  - Calum Scott, singer/songwriter
- 13 October
  - Jy-mel Coleman, rugby player and coach
  - George Crook, rugby player
  - Stephen Flynn, politician
- 14 October
  - Will Atkinson, footballer
  - James Craven, rugby player
- 16 October
  - Tom Ballard, rock climber (d. 2021)
  - Cameron Belford, footballer
- 17 October
  - Alex Cheesman, rugby player
  - Will Cliff, rugby player
- 18 October – Sam Quek, field hockey player and television presenter
- 19 October
  - Scott Barrow, footballer
  - James Creaney, footballer and coach
- 22 October – Jamie N. Commons, singer/songwriter
- 23 October – Gavin Bilton, strongman
- 25 October – Rylan Clark-Neal, television personality
- 26 October – Richard Charlesworth, Olympic swimmer
- 28 October – Edd Gould, flash animator and creator of Eddsworld (d. 2012)
- 31 October
  - Ben Bruce, guitarist and vocalist for Asking Alexandria
  - Danielle Bowman, footballer and coach
  - Ben Bruce, vocalist and guitarist for Asking Alexandria (2006-2024)
  - Lizzy Yarnold, skeleton Olympic skeleton racer

=== November ===
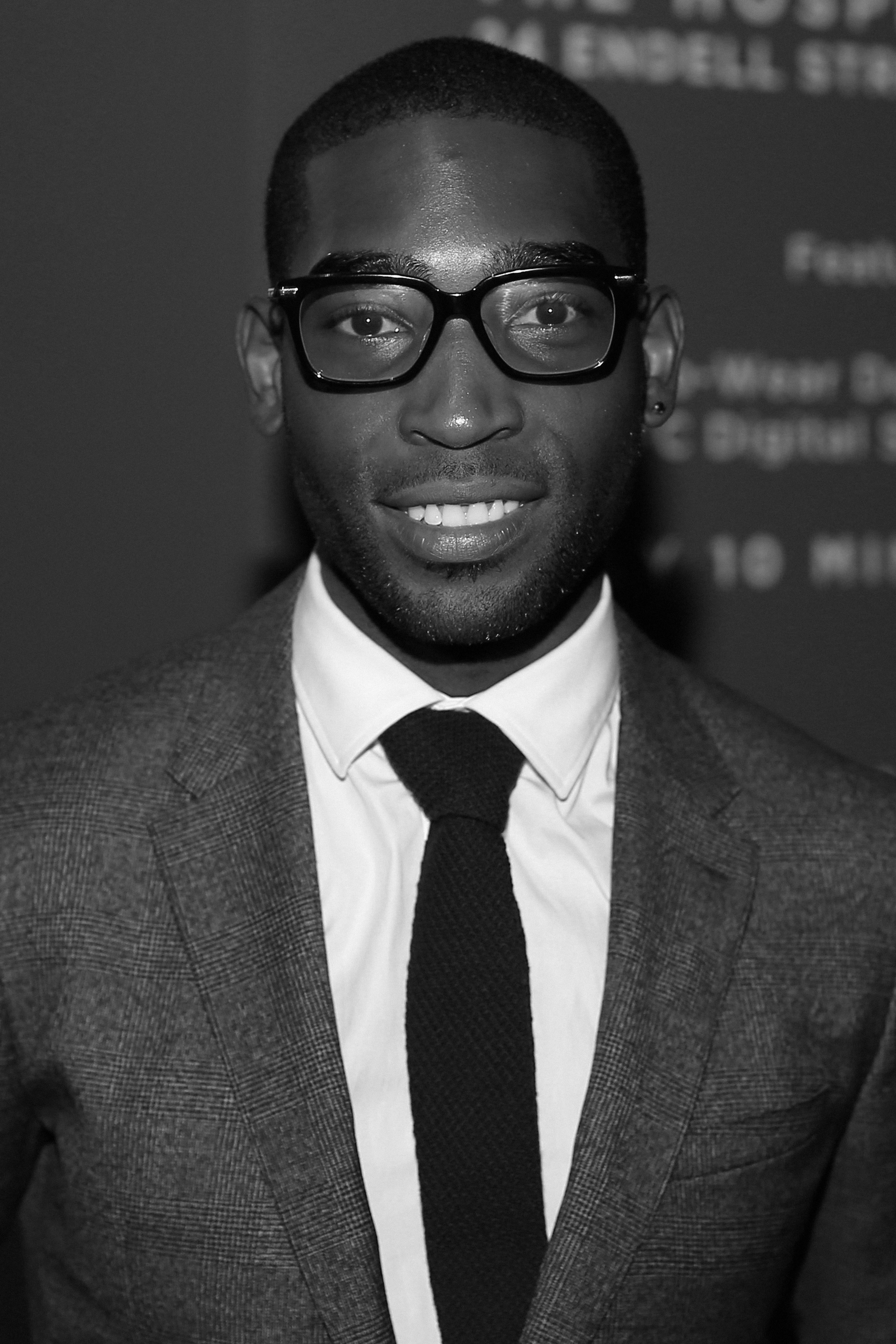
Tinie Tempah

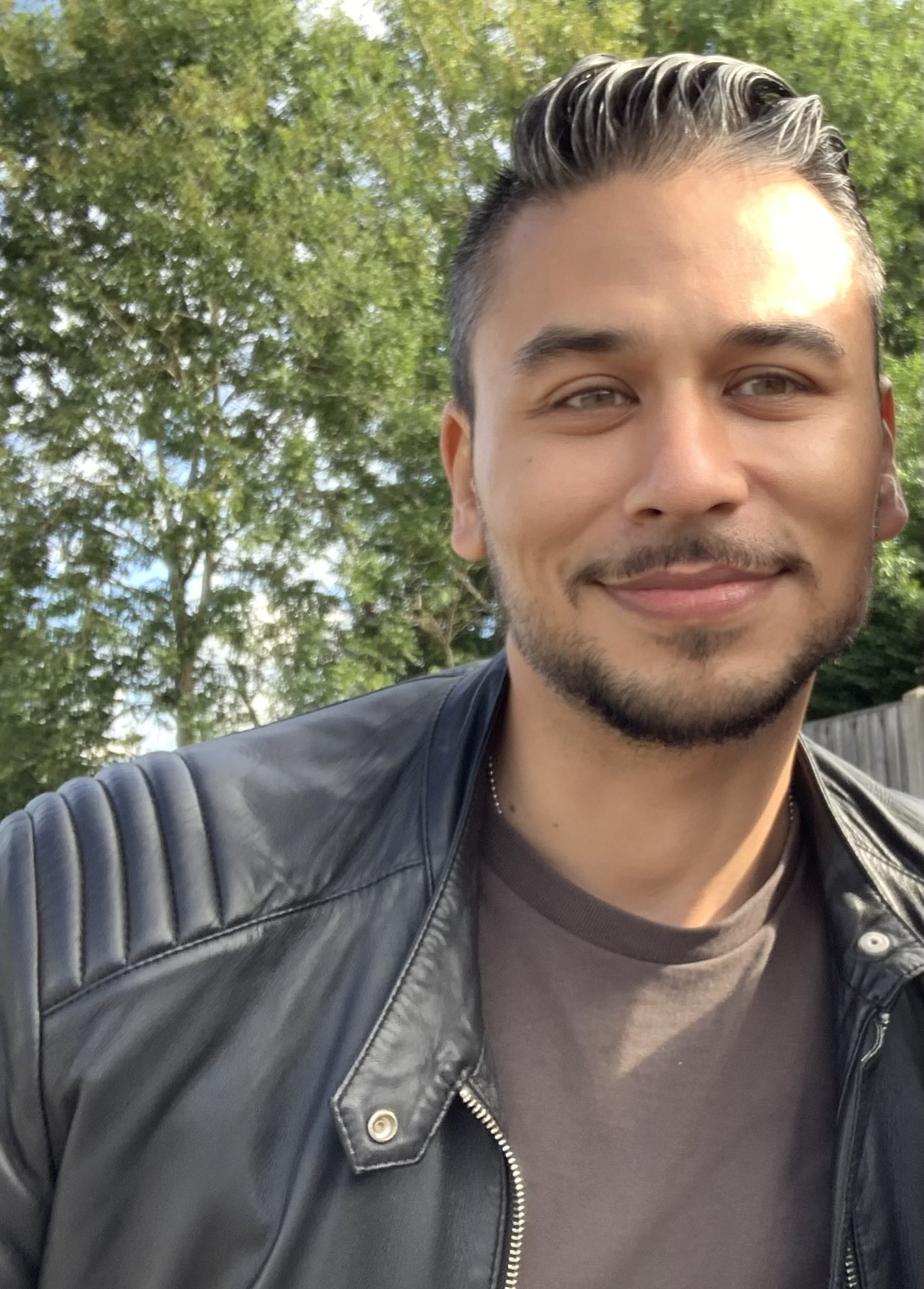
Ricky Norwood

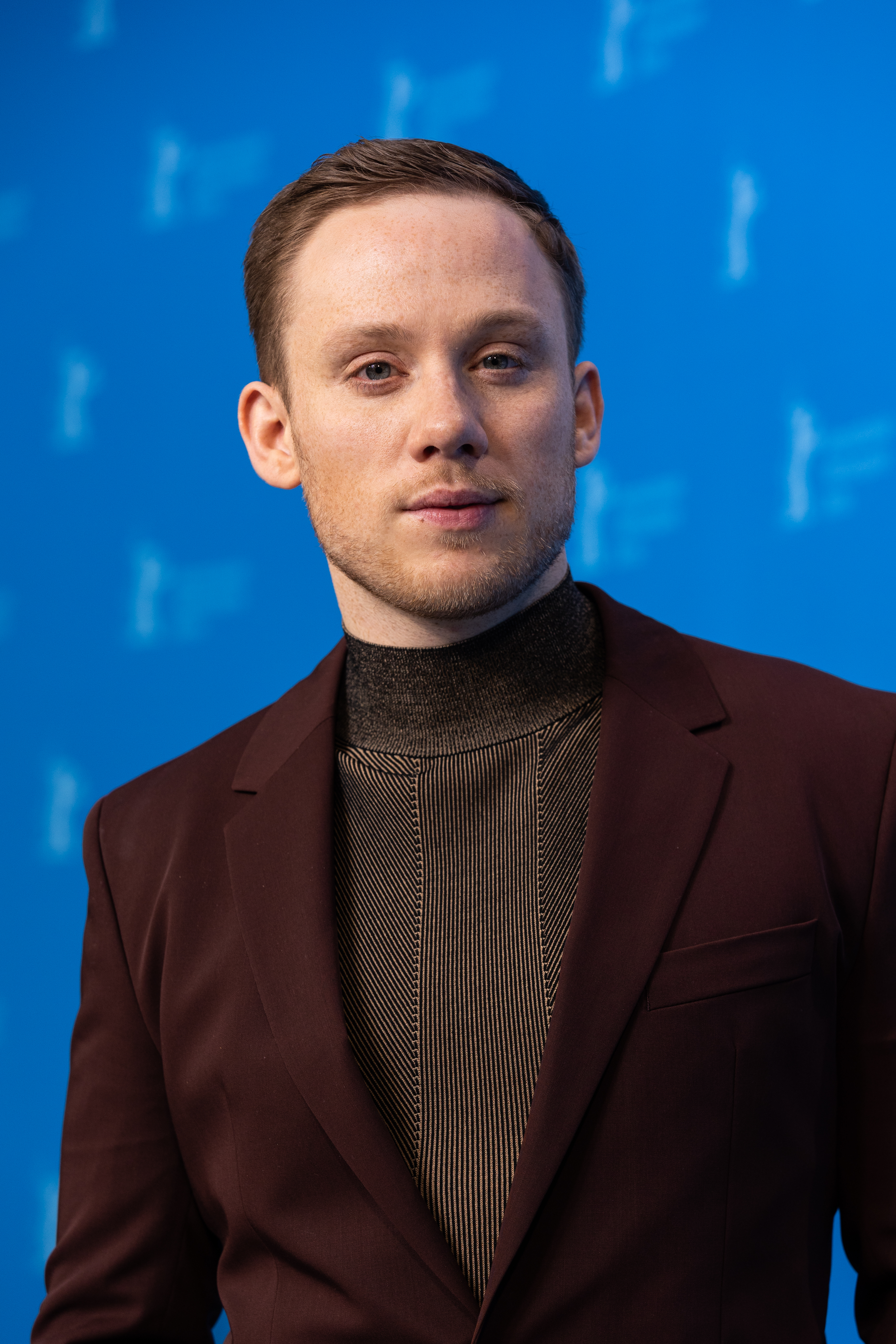
Joe Cole

- 1 November
  - Scott Arfield, footballer
  - Jamie Annerson, footballer
- 2 November
  - Andy Allen, politician
  - Lisa Bowman, netball player
  - Joe Chandler, rugby player
- 3 November – Rachel Cawthorn, Olympic canoeist
- 4 November
  - Cleo., rapper
  - Troy Archibald-Henville, footballer
- 7 November – Tinie Tempah, rapper
- 8 November – James Craig, rugby player
- 11 November – Paul Butler, boxer
- 12 November – Alistair Brammer, actor and singer
- 15 November
  - Ricky Norwood, actor
  - Billy Twelvetrees, rugby player
- 18 November
  - Adam J. Bernard, actor and singer
  - Christopher D. Cook, composer and conductor
- 20 November – Matty Blythe, rugby player
- 22 November
  - Johnathan Akinyemi, British-born Nigerian Olympic canoeist
  - Jodie Aysha, singer/songwriter
  - Jamie Campbell Bower, actor and singer
- 23 November
  - Ben Brown, cricketer
  - John Campbell, footballer
- 25 November – James Campbell, cricketer
- 26 November
  - Chris Ashling, cricketer and coach
  - Luke Boden, footballer
  - Tamsin Egerton, actress and model
- 28 November – Joe Cole, actor
- 29 November – Jonny Arr, rugby player
- 30 November – Grant Basey, footballer

=== December ===
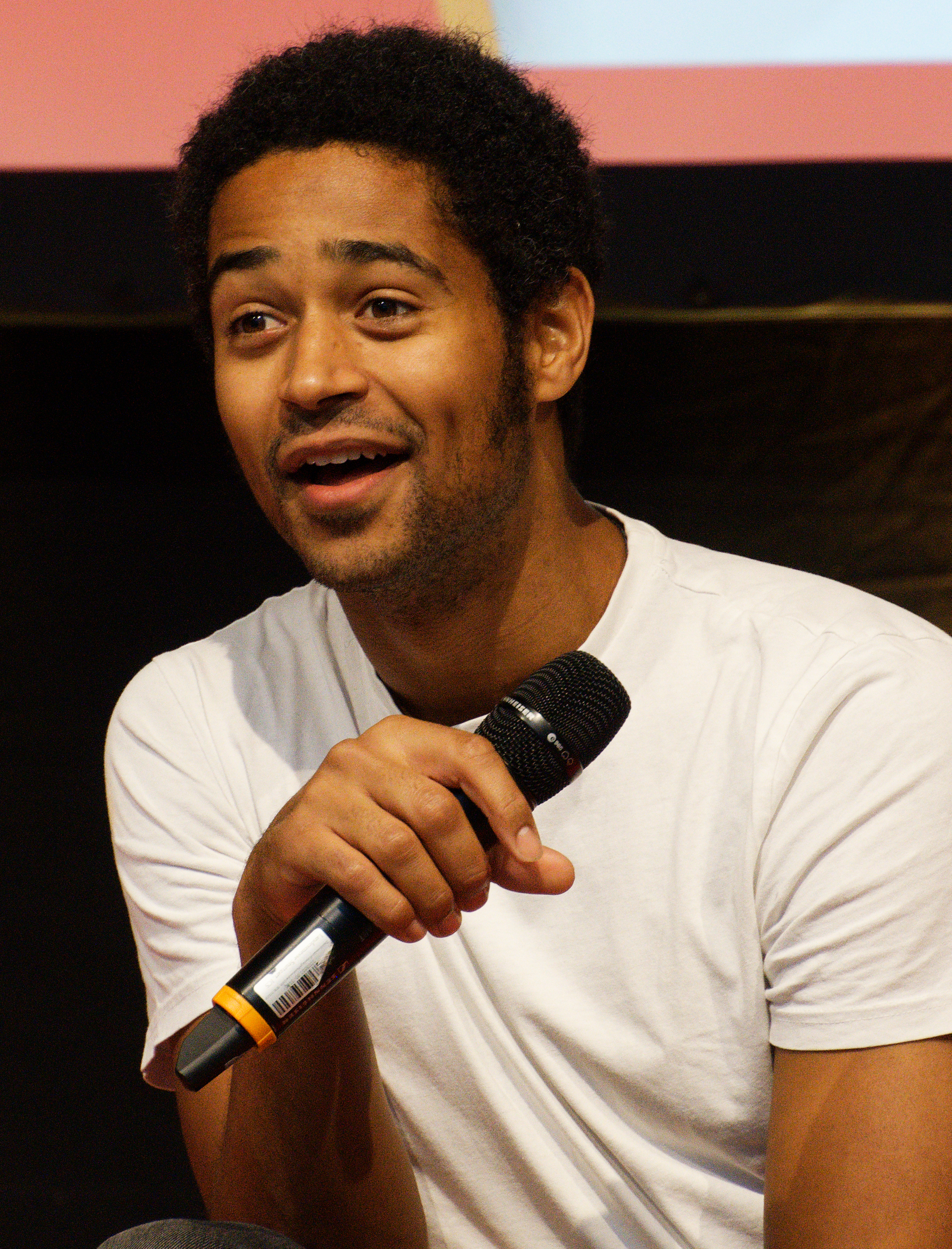
Alfred Enoch

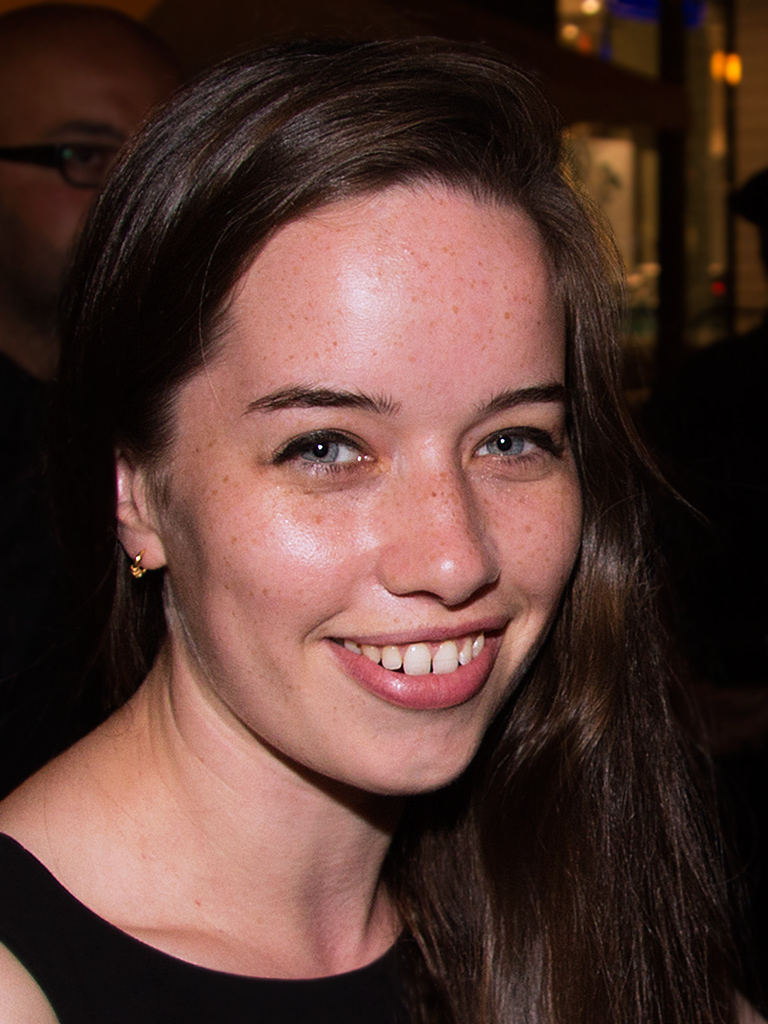
Anna Popplewell

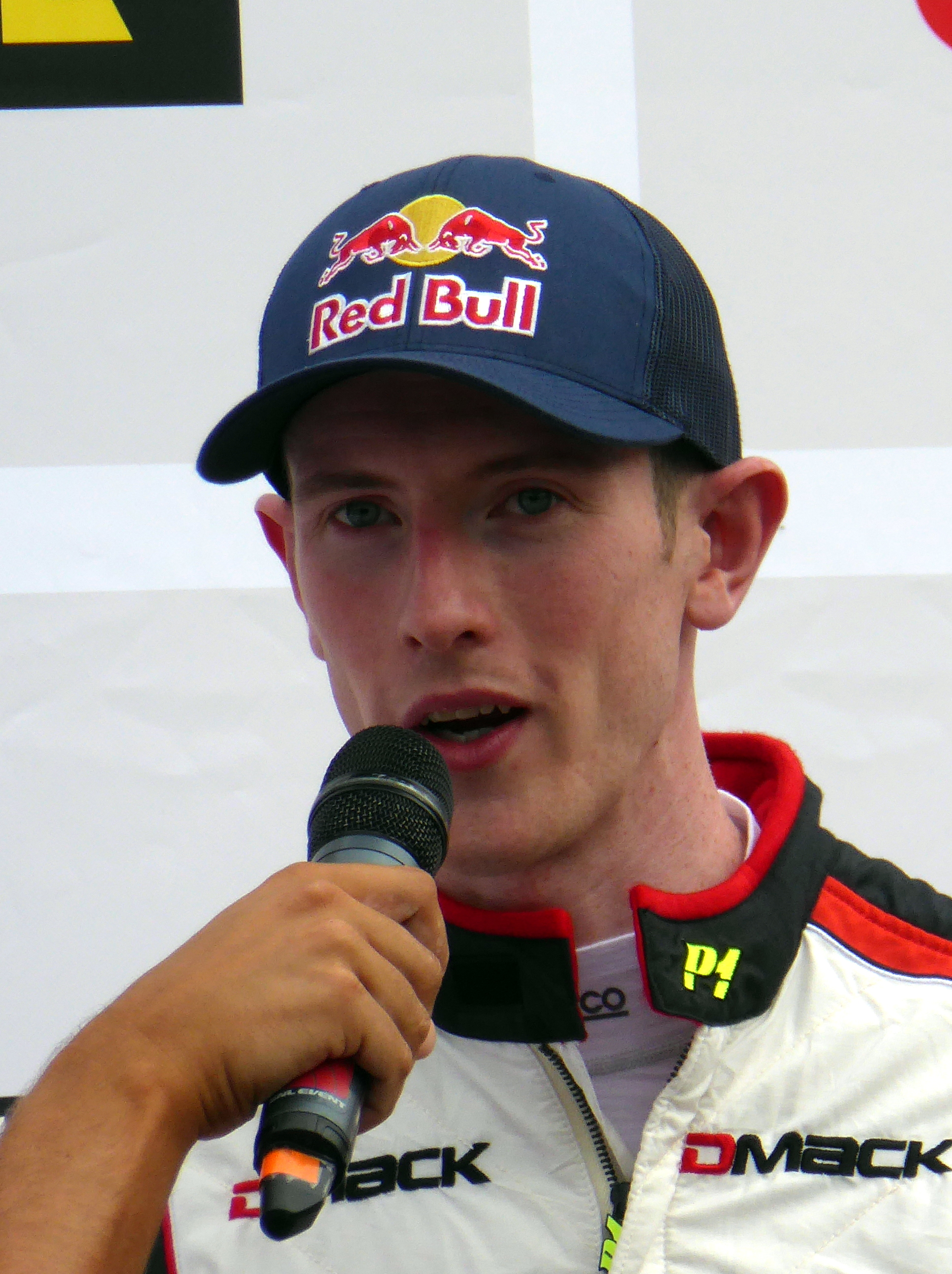
Elfyn Evans

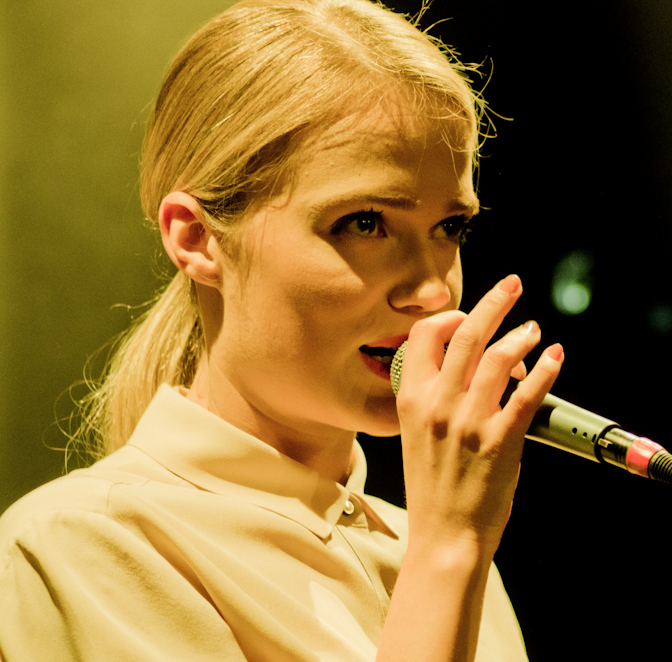
Florrie

- 1 December – Kylie Cockburn, football official
- 2 December
  - Alfred Enoch, British-born Brazilian actor
  - Edward Windsor, Lord Downpatrick, travel consultant, fashion designer, and financial analyst
- 5 December – Joanna Rowsell, cyclist
- 7 December – Benjamin Clementine, singer/songwriter
- 9 December – Ryan Bevington, rugby player
- 12 December
  - Benbrick, songwriter, producer, and composer
  - Adrian Clifton, footballer
- 13 December
  - Meji Alabi, British-born Nigerian filmmaker
  - Darcy Blake, footballer
  - Charles Cousins, Olympic rower
  - Paul Johnston, cricketer
- 14 December – Sam Burgess, rugby player and coach
- 15 December
  - Gregg Chillin, actor, director, and writer
  - Emily Head, actress
- 16 December
  - Paul Bennett, Olympic rower
  - Anna Popplewell, actress
- 17 December – Callum Beaumont, bagpipe player
- 18 December
  - Lizzie Armitstead, racing cyclist
  - Elliott Bennett, footballer
  - Francoise Boufhal, model, actress, and presenter
  - Helen H. Carr, writer and historian
- 22 December
  - Ed Asafu-Adjaye, footballer
  - Matt Bush, Paralympic taekwondo practitioner
- 23 December – Brooke Burfitt, actress and radio presenter
- 24 December – Matty Askin, boxer
- 25 December – Matthew Ahmet, kung fu practitioner
- 26 December – Bassam Beidas, British-born Lebanese tennis player
- 27 December – Sarvi Kalhor, singer and recording artist
- 28 December
  - Ched Evans, footballer
  - Elfyn Evans, rally driver
  - Florrie, pop singer
- 30 December
  - Kirsty-Leigh Porter, actress
  - Leon Jackson, singer

=== Full Date Unknown ===
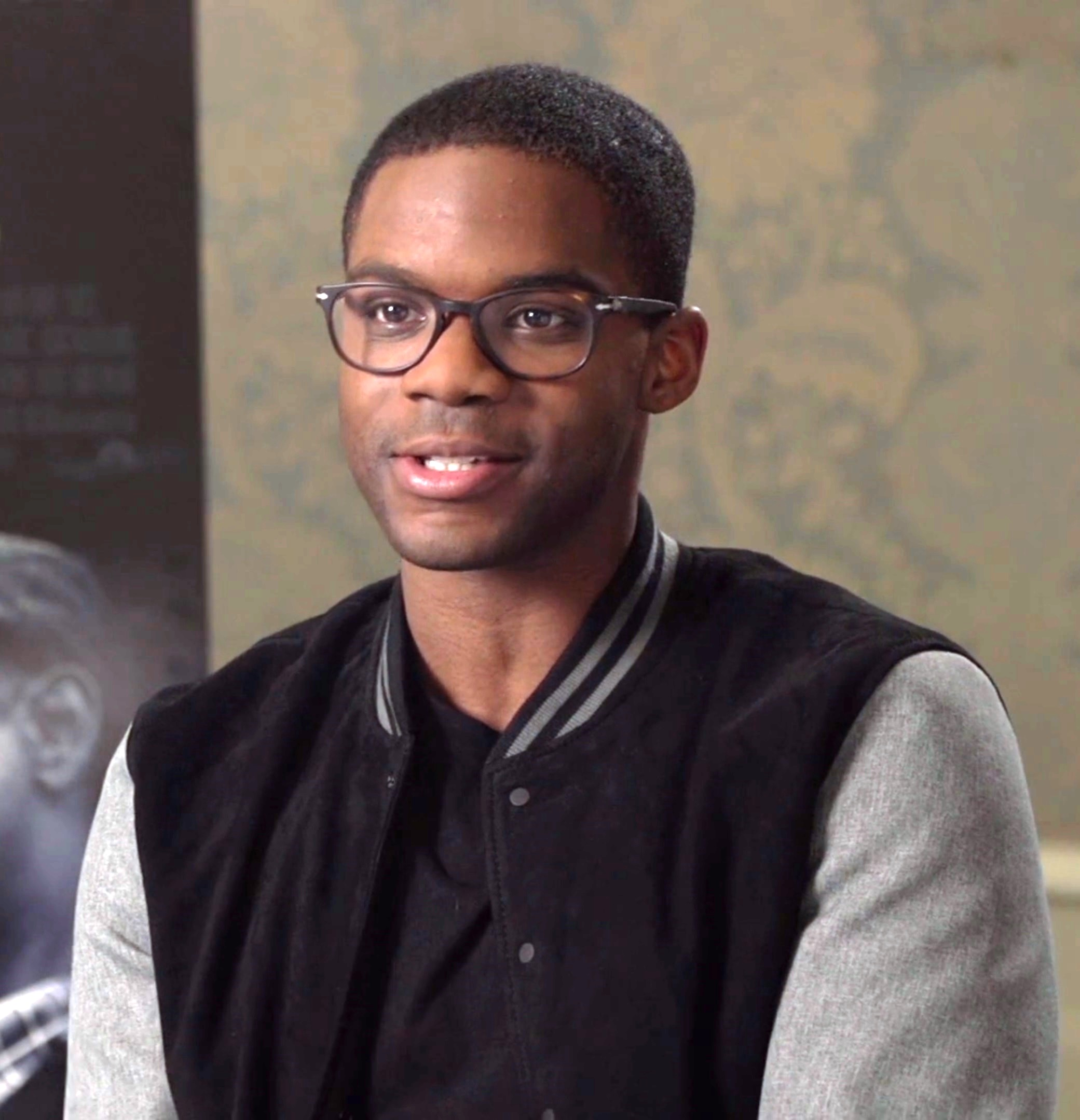
Jovan Adepo

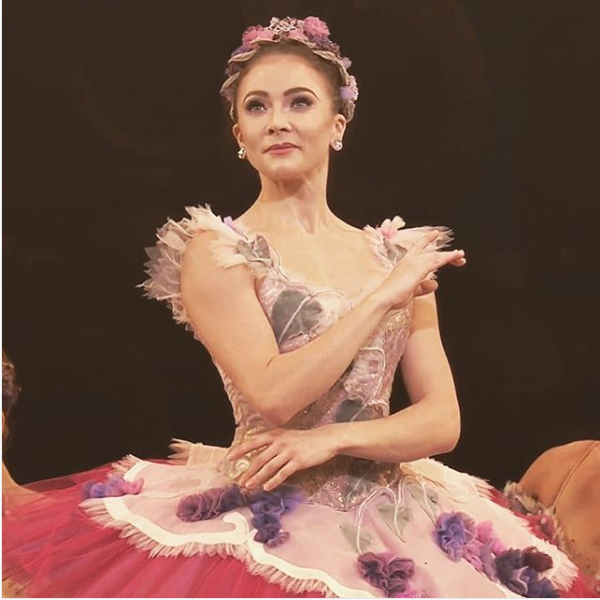
Claire Calvert

- Jovan Adepo, British-born American actor
- John Alexander, politician
- James Allenby-Kirk, actor, comedian, and writer
- Andy Balcon, singer, guitarist, and composer
- Simon Barrett, cricketer
- Danny Beales, politician
- Jay Bernard, writer
- Kaliane Bradley, writer and editor
- Oyinkan Braithwaite, Nigerian-born novelist and writer
- Lewis Bush, photographer
- Claire Calvert, ballerina
- Tom Coult, composer
- Lucy Cox, artist and curator

== Deaths ==
=== January ===
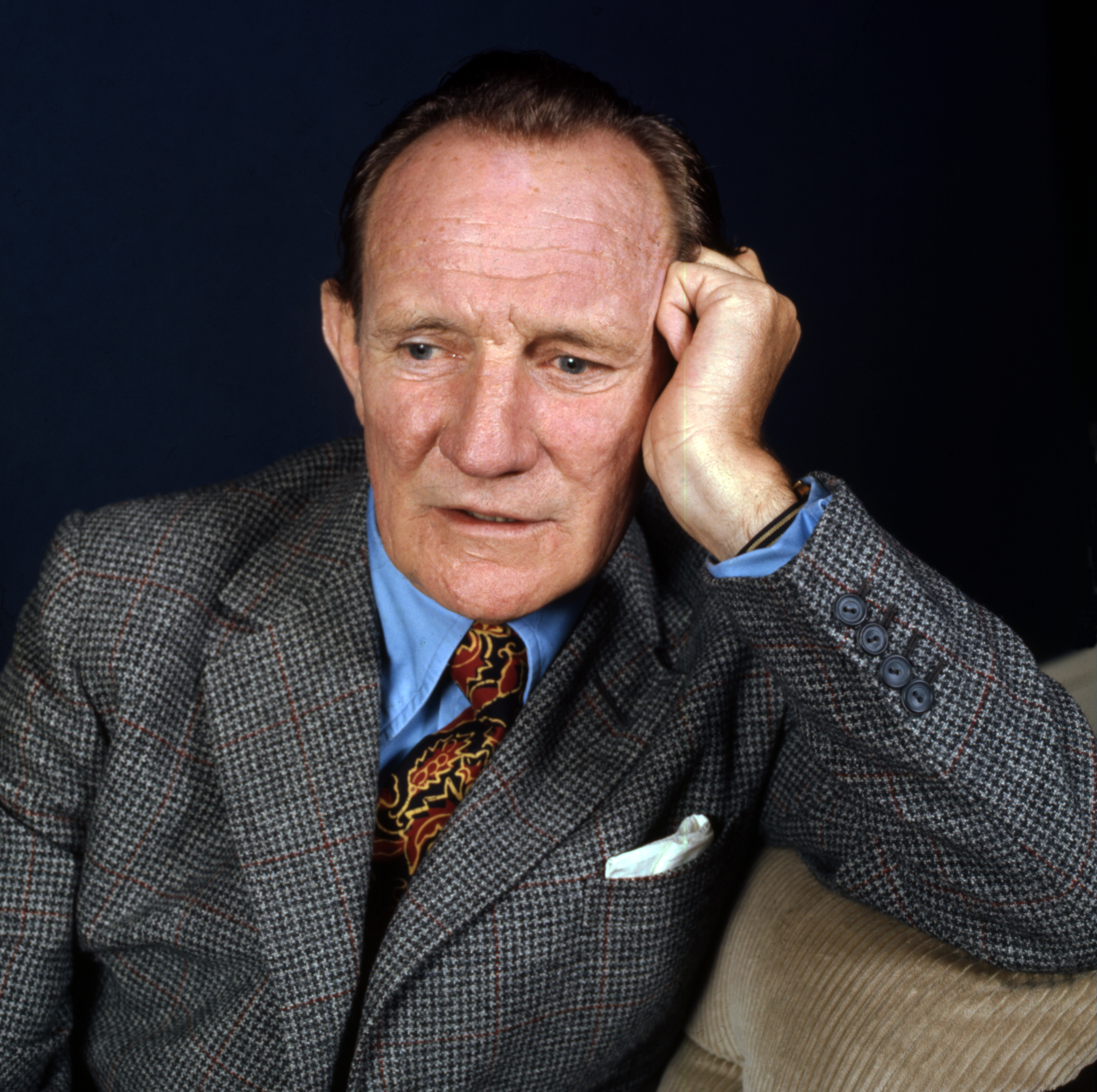
Trevor Howard

- 1 January – Margot Bryant, actress (born 1897)
- 2 January – E. B. Ford, geneticist (born 1901)
- 3 January – Bill Gibb, fashion designer (born 1944)
- 6 January – L. P. Davies, novelist (born 1914)
- 7 January
  - Trevor Howard, actor (born 1913)
  - Michael Mills, television producer (born 1919)
- 13 January – Donald Healey, rally driver, automobile engineer and speed record holder (born 1898)
- 14 January – John Worrall, RAF vice marshal (born 1911)
- 16 January
  - Ballard Berkeley, actor (born 1904)
  - Bob Keegan, actor (born 1924)
- 17 January – Harry Jacobs, orchestral conductor (born 1888)
- 31 January – Thomas Forbes, poet and painter (born 1900)

=== February ===
- 1 February
  - Gerald Butler, crime fiction writer (born 1907)
  - Stephen Taylor, Baron Taylor, physician and civil servant (born 1910)
- 5 February – Emeric Pressburger, scriptwriter and producer (born 1902, Austria-Hungary)
- 6 February – Marghanita Laski, journalist, novelist and niece of Harold Laski (born 1915)
- 7 February – Ray Martin, composer and orchestral conductor (born 1918, Austria)
- 9 February
  - Marjorie May Bacon, painter and printmaker (born 1902)
  - Helen McCourt, insurance clerk (born 1965; murdered)
  - William Sackville, 10th Earl De La Warr, peer (born 1921; suicide)
- 11 February
  - Marion Crawford, Scottish nanny of Elizabeth II (born 1909)
  - Sir Arnold Ashley Miles, microbiologist (born 1904)
- 13 February – Léon Goossens, oboist (born 1897)
- 16 February – Madeleine Bingham, author and playwright, wife of John Bingham, 7th Baron Clanmorris (born 1912)
- 18 February – Michael Howard, actor and comedian (born 1916)
- 22 February
  - Barrie Heath, pilot and Battle of Britain veteran (born 1916)
  - Cecil Beresford Ramage, actor, politician and barrister (born 1895)
- 25 February – H. E. Todd, writer (born 1908)
- 27 February – Basil Boothroyd, humorous writer (born 1910)

=== March ===
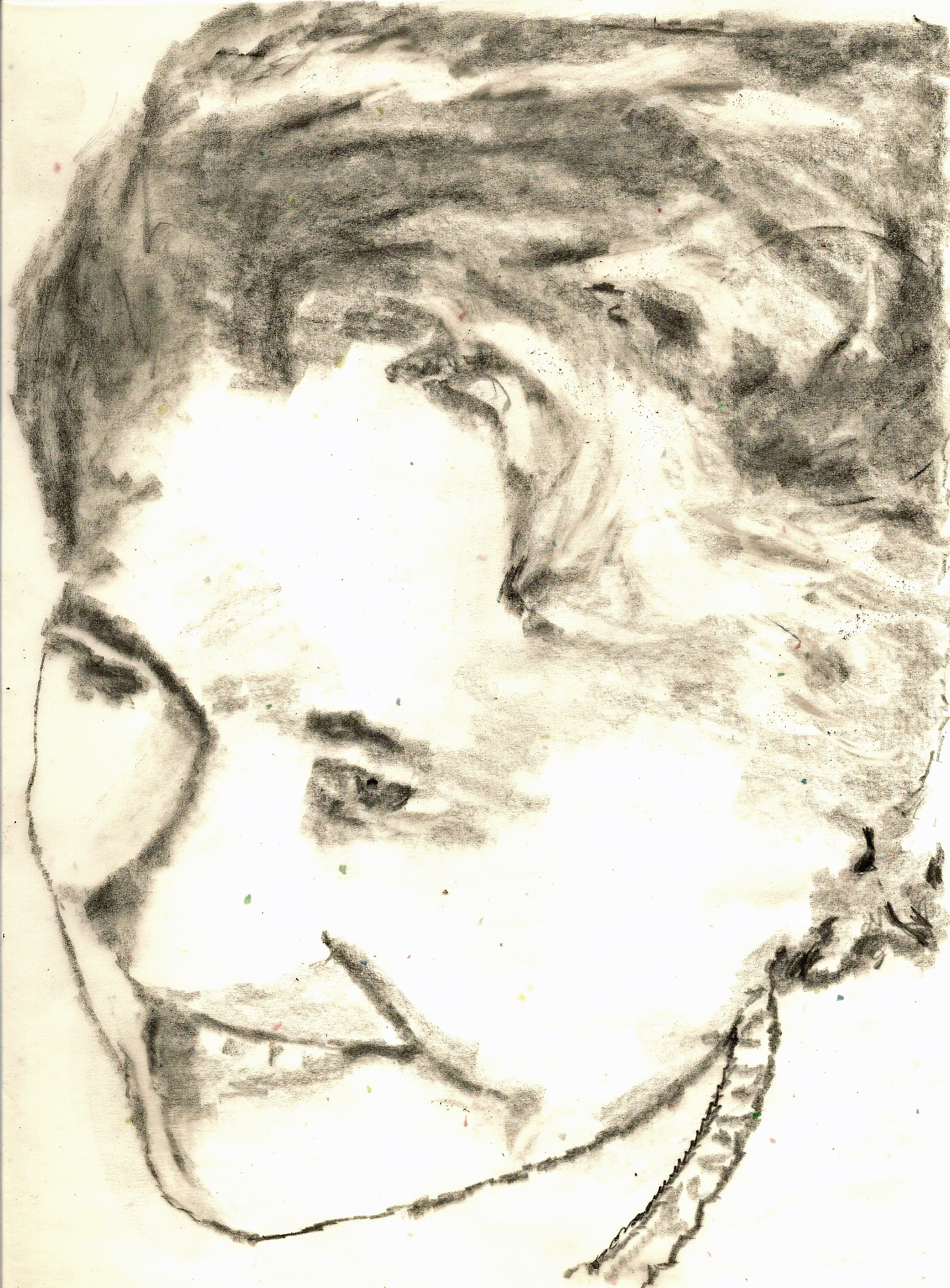
Christianna Brand

- 2 March – Ronald Senior, Army brigadier (born 1904)
- 6 March – Joan Hassall, wood engraver and illustrator (born 1906)
- 7 March – Gordon Huntley, guitarist (born 1925)
- 10 March
  - Andy Gibb, musician (Bee Gees) (born 1958)
  - Hugh Lindsay, Army major and royal bodyguard (killed in avalanche) (born 1953)
  - Gerald Wilkinson, art historian (road accident) (born 1926)
  - William Wordsworth, composer (born 1908)
- 11 March
  - Christianna Brand, crime fiction writer (born 1907)
  - Nicholas Eliot, 9th Earl of St Germans, peer (born 1914)
- 12 March
  - Arnold Bell, actor (born 1901)
  - Martin Smellie, Scottish biochemist (born 1924)
- 13 March – Henry Johnson, railway executive (born 1906)
- 18 March – Percy Thrower, gardener and broadcaster (born 1913)
- 21 March – Patrick Steptoe, obstetrician and gynaecologist (born 1913)
- 26 March – George Miles, organist (born 1913)

=== April ===
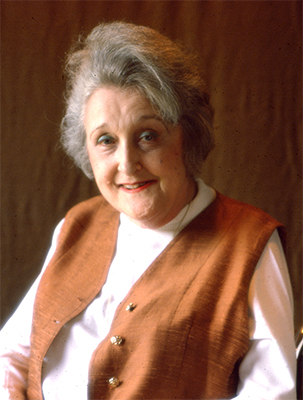
Felicity Lane-Fox, Baroness Lane-Fox

- 4 April
  - Eric A. Havelock, classical scholar (born 1903)
  - Sir Archibald Southby, 2nd Baronet, cricketer and Army officer (born 1910)
- 5 April – Anthony Emery, Roman Catholic prelate (born 1918)
- 6 April – John Clements, actor (born 1910)
- 10 April – Francis Jones, physicist (born 1914)
- 12 April – Harry McShane, socialist (born 1891)
- 14 April – John Stonehouse, government minister noted for faking his own death (born 1925)
- 15 April – Kenneth Williams, comic actor (born 1926)
- 16 April – Bobby Thompson, comedian (born 1911)
- 17 April – Felicity Lane-Fox, Baroness Lane-Fox, disability rights campaigner (born 1918)
- 23 April – Michael Ramsey, Anglican prelate, Archbishop of Canterbury (1961–1974) (born 1904)
- 25 April – Sir Hugh Rankin, 3rd Baronet, soldier and sheep farmer (born 1899)
- 26 April – William Fox-Pitt, Army major-general (born 1896)
- 27 April – David Scarboro, actor (born 1968)
- 28 April – Fenner Brockway, socialist politician and pacifist (born 1888 in British India)

=== May ===
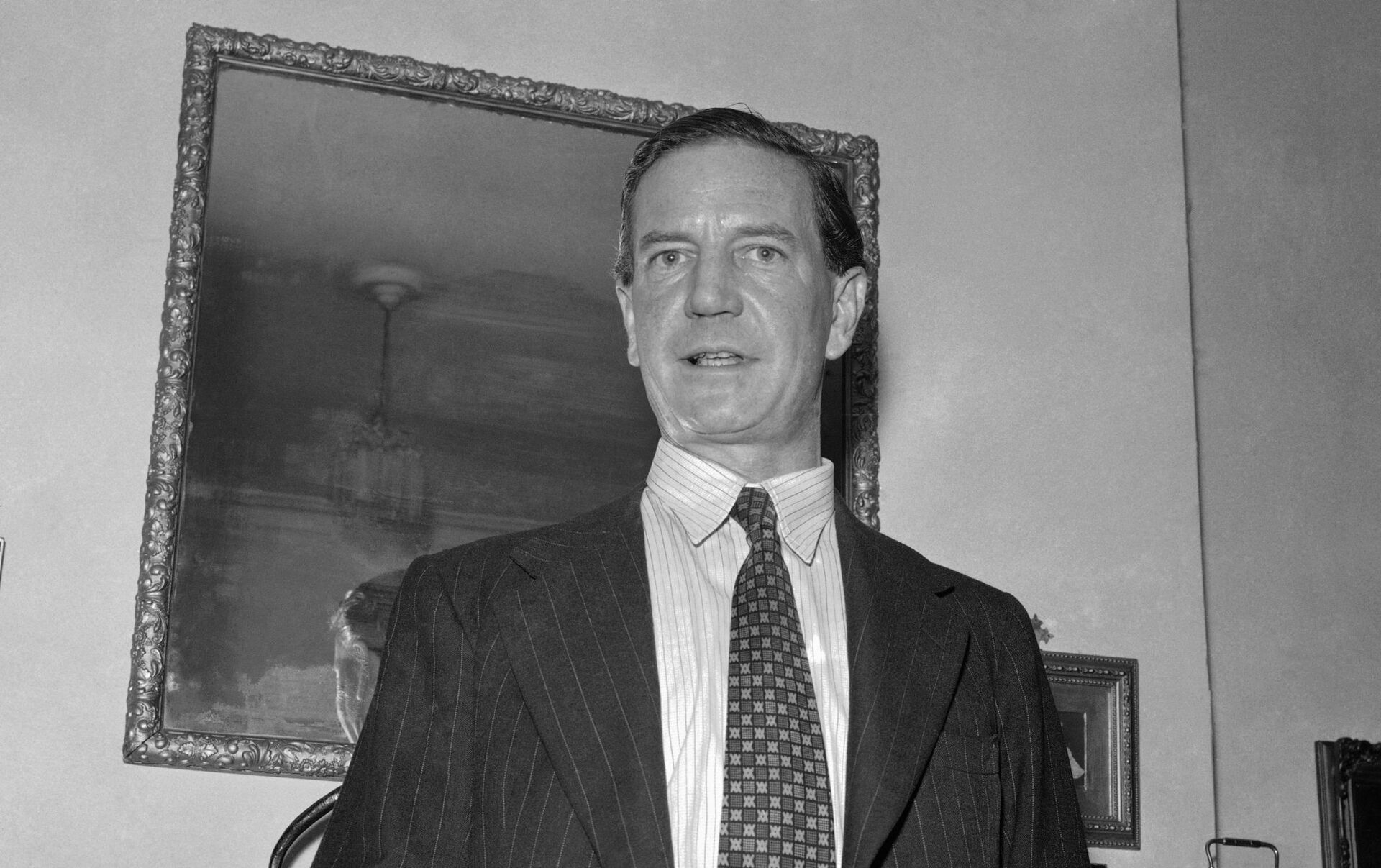
Kim Philby

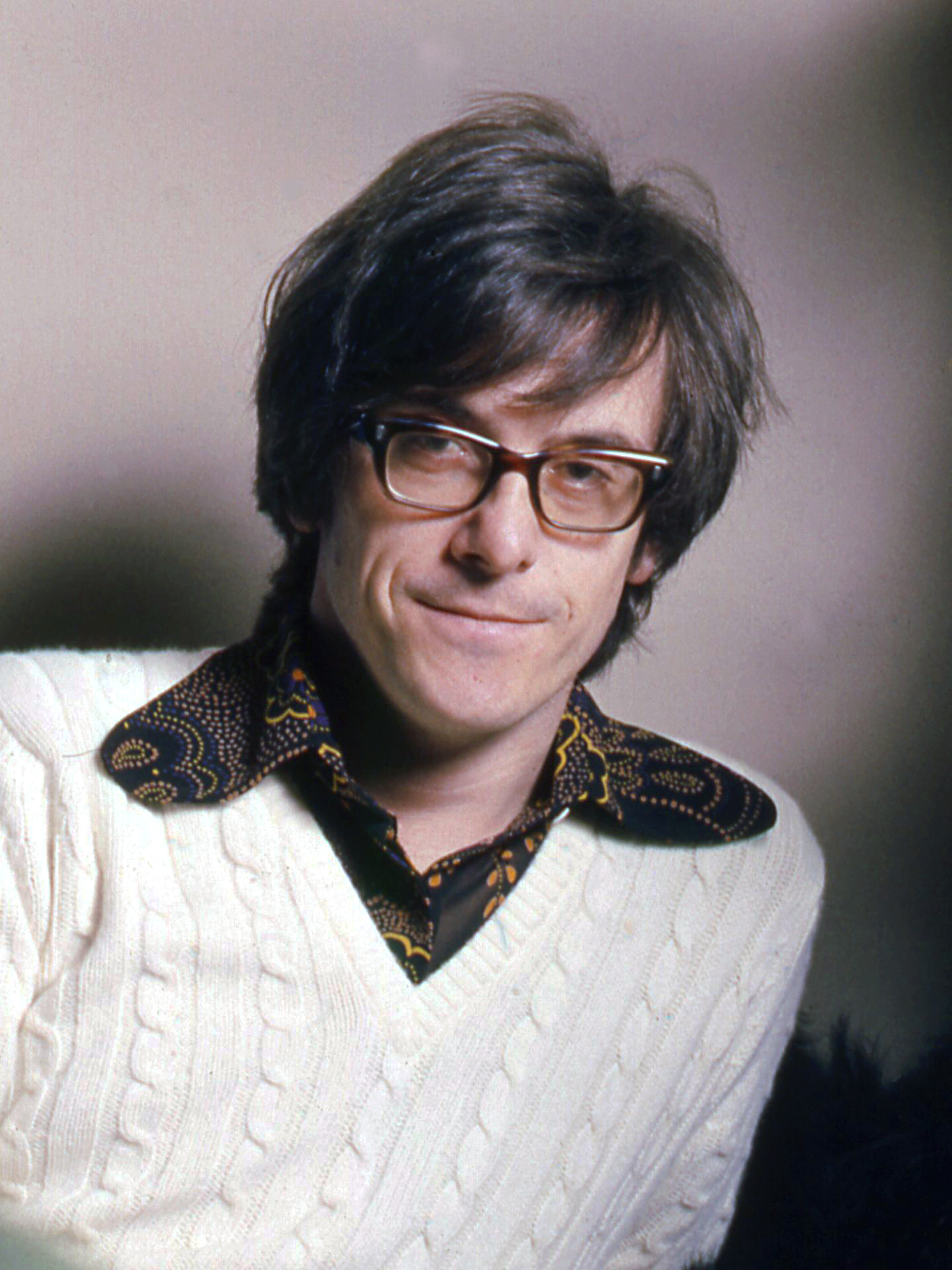
Sheridan Dufferin

- 2 May – Tom Walshaw, engineer and author (born 1912)
- 4 May – Stanley William Hayter, painter (born 1901)
- 5 May – George Rose, actor (victim of assault) (born 1920)
- 11 May
  - Isabella Gordon, marine biologist (born 1901)
  - Kim Philby, spy (born 1912)
- 13 May
  - Irene Manton, botanist (born 1904)
  - Sir Watkin Williams-Wynn, 10th Baronet, soldier and landowner (born 1904)
  - Dame Albertine Winner, physician (born 1907)
- 16 May
  - Dan Frankel, Labour politician (born 1900)
  - Charles Keeping, illustrator (born 1924)
  - Bruce Watson, chemist and Scottish National Party politician (born 1910)
- 17 May – Harry Shepherd, speedway rider (born 1903)
- 18 May
  - Anthony Forwood, actor (born 1915)
  - Sir Brandon Rhys-Williams, Conservative Party MP (born 1927)
- 24 May – Freddie Frith, motorcycle racer (born 1909)
- 28 May – Sir Norman Skelhorn, barrister (born 1909)
- 29 May – Sheridan Dufferin (5th Marquess of Dufferin and Ava), peer and patron of the arts (born 1938)

=== June ===
- 5 June – Michael Barrington, actor (born 1924)
- 8 June – Russell Harty, television presenter (born 1934)
- 10 June
  - Rudolph Dunbar, musician and composer (born 1899 in British Guiana)
  - Willie Ross, Baron Ross of Marnock, politician (born 1911)
- 13 June – Thomas McKeown, physician and historian of medicine (born 1912)
- 15 June – George Ward, 1st Viscount Ward of Witley, politician (born 1907)
- 17 June – Elizabeth Lane, barrister, first woman High Court judge in England (born 1905)
- 18 June – Elizabeth Gardner, physicist (born 1957)
- 21 June – T. E. Utley, journalist and writer (born 1921)
- 22 June – Bramwell Fletcher, actor (born 1904)
- 24 June – Hugh Lockhart-Mummery, surgeon (born 1918)
- 28 June – Iris Origo, British-born Italian biographer and writer (born 1902)
- 30 June – Alan W. Bishop, geotechnical engineer who gave his name to Bishop's method (born 1920)

=== July ===
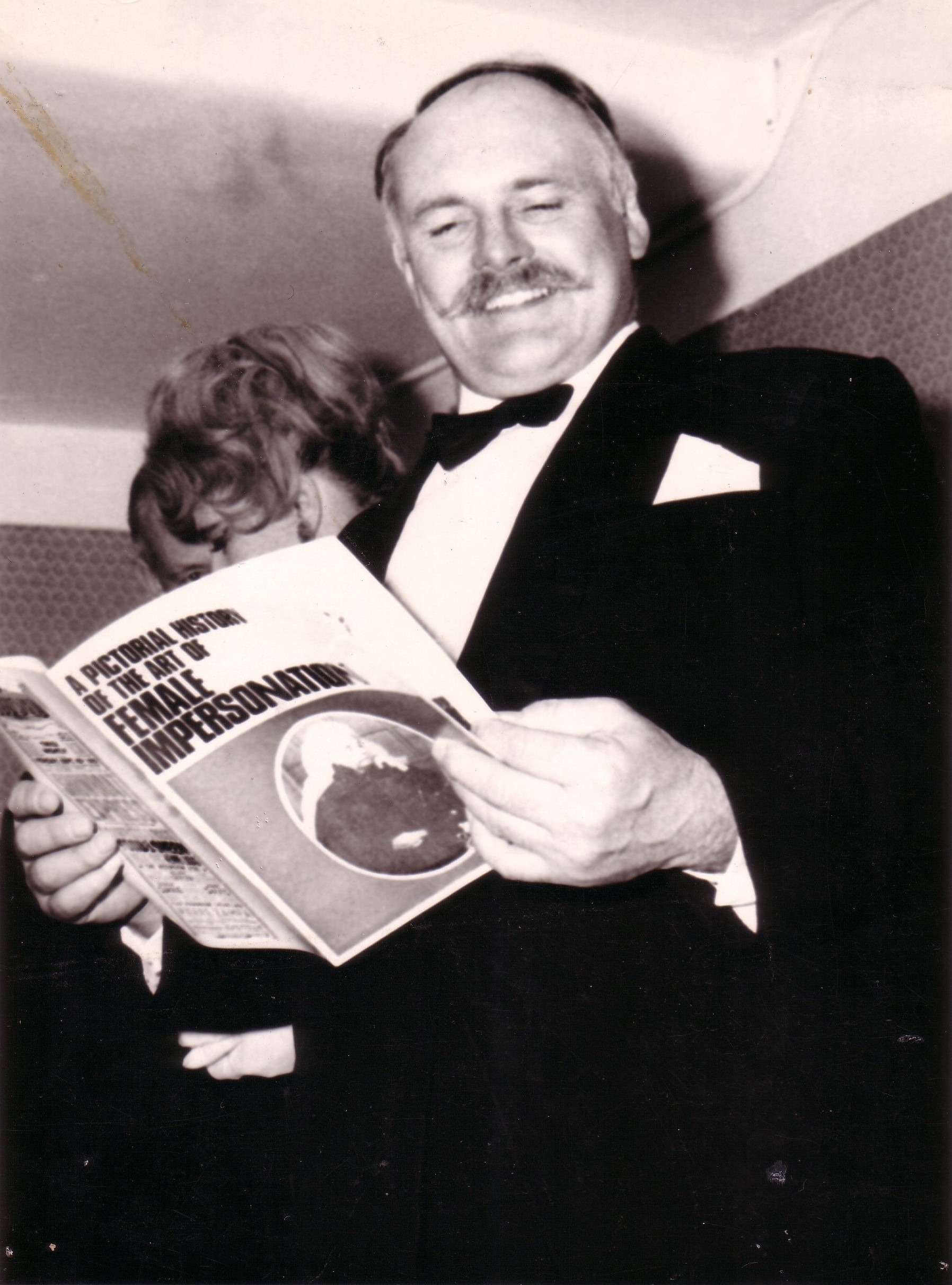
Jimmy Edwards

- 3 July – George Lloyd, composer (born 1913)
- 4 July – Elizabeth Cockayne, nurse, first Chief Nursing Officer of the NHS (born 1894)
- 7 July – Jimmy Edwards, comedy actor (born 1920)
- 8 July
  - Sir Antony Fisher, businessman (born 1915)
  - Freddie West, RAF Air Commodore and VC recipient (born 1896)
- 9 July
  - Ian Allan, RAF air commodore and World War II flying ace (born 1918)
  - Barbara Woodhouse, dog trainer (born 1910)
- 10 July
  - Noel Barber, novelist (born 1909)
  - Errol John, actor (born 1924 in Trinidad)
- 11 July
  - Janet Lacey, philanthropist (born 1903)
  - Barbara Wootton, Baroness Wootton of Abinger, sociologist and life peer (born 1897)
- 12 July
  - Josephine Douglas, actress (born 1926)
  - Julian Trevelyan, artist and poet (born 1910)
- 20 July – Mark Boxer, magazine editor (born 1931)
- 22 July – Patrick Newell, actor (born 1932)
- 23 July – Stuart Legg, filmmaker (born 1910)
- 24 July – John Harris, footballer and manager (born 1917)
- 25 July
  - Bob Currie, motorcyclist and author (born 1918)
  - Douglas Hickox, film director (born 1929)
- 28 July – John Wheatley, Baron Wheatley, politician and judge (born 1908)
- July – William Rolls, World War II air ace (born 1914)

=== August ===
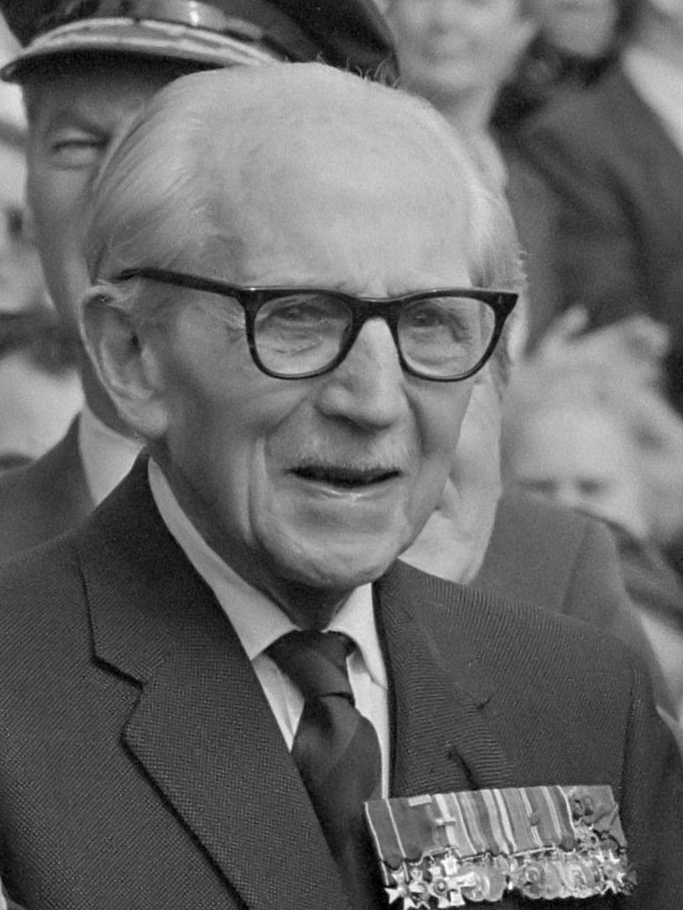
Allan Adair

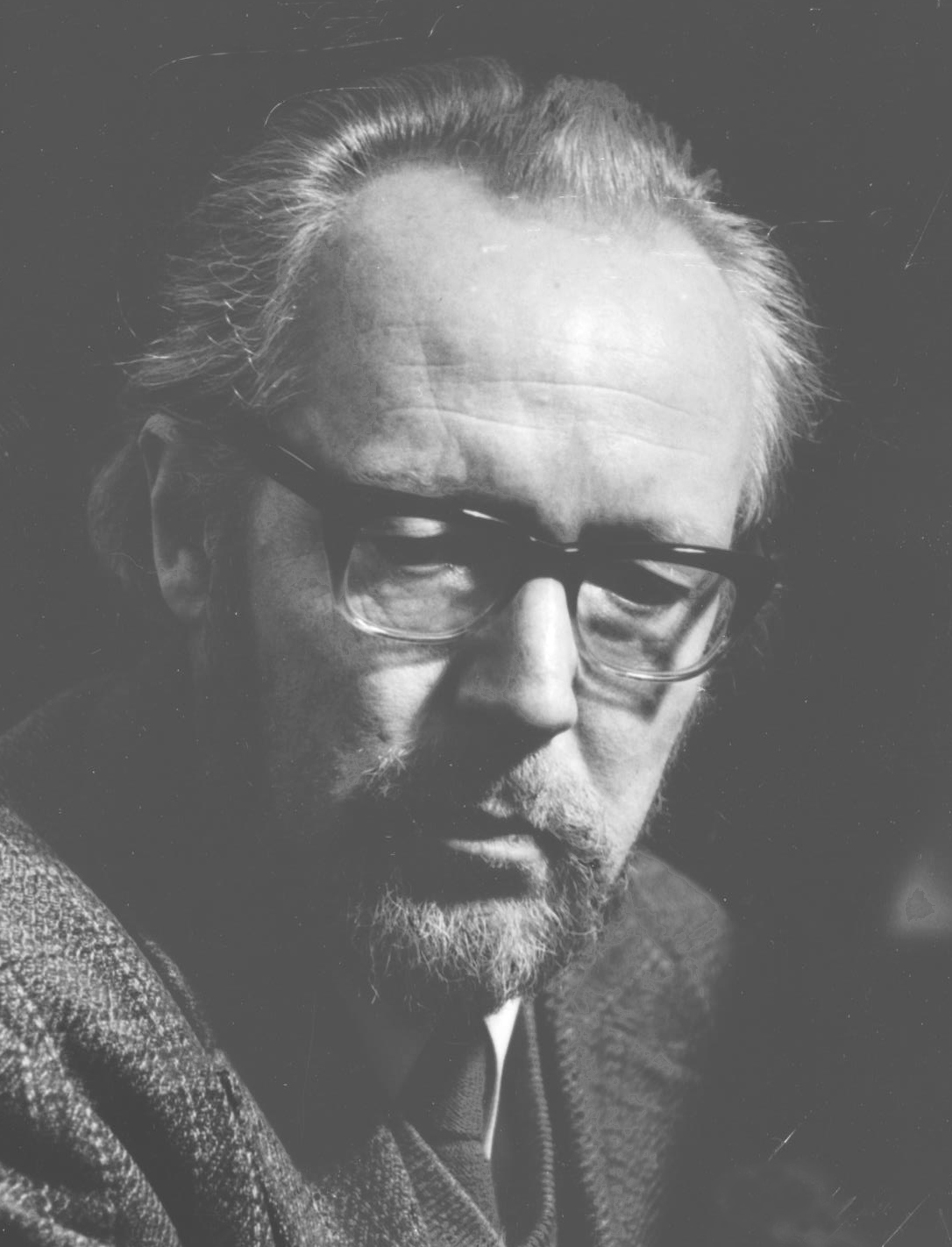
Kenneth Leighton

- 1 August – Steve Mills, footballer (born 1953)
- 4 August – Sir Allan Adair, 6th Baronet, Army major-general (born 1897)
- 6 August – John Bingham, 7th Baron Clanmorris, peer, spy and crime fiction writer, husband of Madeleine Bingham (born 1908)
- 8 August – Alan Napier, actor (born 1903)
- 9 August – Peggy Cochrane, musician and composer (born 1902)
- 12 August – R. N. Smith, veterinary surgeon (born 1926)
- 13 August – Sydney Jacobson, Baron Jacobson, journalist and political commentator (born 1908)
- 14 August
  - Robert Calvert, writer and musician (Hawkwind) (born 1945 in South Africa)
  - Michael Crowder, historian (born 1934)
- 17 August – Samuel Silkin, Baron Silkin, politician and cricketer (born 1918)
- 18 August
  - Sir Frederick Ashton, choreographer (born 1904, Ecuador)
  - Sir Michael Perrin, nuclear physicist (born 1905, Canada)
- 20 August – Joan G. Robinson, children's author and illustrator (born 1910)
- 23 August – C. Desmond Greaves, Marxist activist and historian (born 1913)
- 24 August – Kenneth Leighton, composer (born 1929)
- 25 August – Henry Joseph Gallagher, Korean War veteran (born 1914)
- 27 August – William Sargant, psychiatrist (born 1907)
- 28 August – Paul Grice, philosopher (born 1913)

=== September ===
- 3 September – John Goodison, musician and record producer (born 1943)
- 9 September – Mona Best, music club proprietor, mother of Pete Best (born 1924, British India)
- 11 September – Roger Hargreaves, children's author (born 1935)
- 12 September – Stephen B. Grimes, production designer and art director (born 1927)
- 14 September
  - Sir Donald Albery, theatre impresario (born 1914)
  - Roy Dutton, World War II flying ace (born 1917)
- 15 September – Sir Frank Francis, librarian and curator of the British Museum (born 1901)
- 16 September – Dick Pym, footballer (born 1893)
- 17 September
  - Nellie Beer, politician, Lord Mayor of Manchester (1966–67) (born 1900)
  - Robert Hall, Baron Roberthall, economist and government advisor (born 1901, Australia)
  - Nat Jackley, comic actor (born 1909)
- 18 September – John Elliot, railway manager (born 1898)
- 20 September – Roy Kinnear, actor (born 1934) (fall from horse in Spain)
- 21 September
  - Harold Balfour, 1st Baron Balfour of Inchrye, politician and World War I air ace (born 1897)
  - Christine Norden, actress (born 1924)
- 23 September
  - Mary Colvin, Army brigadier (WRAC) (born 1907)
  - Arwel Hughes, Welsh orchestral conductor (born 1909)
- 25 September – Nipper Pat Daly, boxer (born 1913)
- 28 September – Frank Caplan, British-born American toy collector and manufacturer (born 1911)

=== October ===
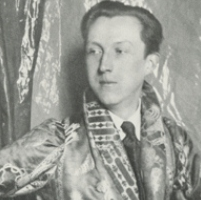
Sacheverell Sitwell

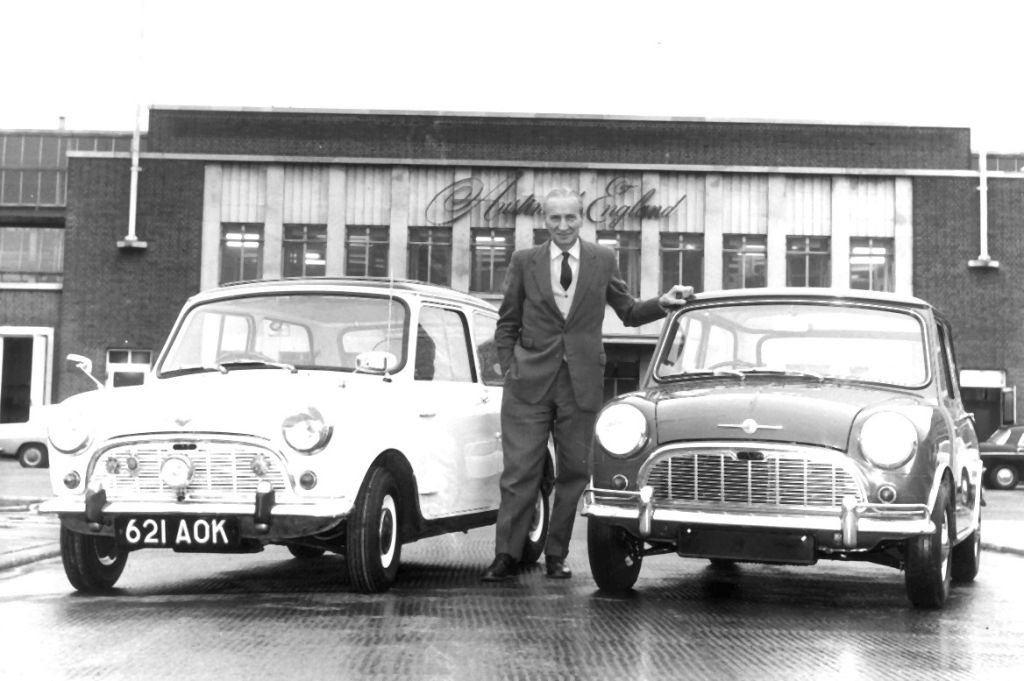
Alec Issigonis

- 1 October – Sir Sacheverell Sitwell, 6th Baronet, writer (born 1897)
- 2 October
  - Robert Blucke, Royal Air Force officer (born 1897)
  - Sir Peter Hunt, Army general (born 1916)
  - Sir Alec Issigonis, car designer (born 1906, Ottoman Empire)
- 4 October – Margaret Lacey, actress (born 1911)
- 7 October – Christian Herbert, 6th Earl of Powis, peer (born 1904)
- 8 October – Charles Beauclerk, 13th Duke of St Albans, peer (born 1915)
- 9 October – Jackie Milburn, footballer (born 1924)
- 11 October
  - Roy Herrick, actor (born 1936)
  - Hugh Percy, 10th Duke of Northumberland, peer (born 1914)
- 14 October – Graham Hutton, economist and author (born 1904)
- 15 October – Kaikhosru Shapurji Sorabji, composer, music critic, pianist, and writer (born 1892)
- 16 October – John Gwilym Jones, Welsh dramatist (born 1904)
- 18 October – Michael ffolkes, illustrator and cartoonist (born 1925)
- 19 October – Mildred Ratcliffe, painter (born 1899)
- 20 October – Sheila Scott, aviator (born 1927)
- 26 October – Ruth Gervis, illustrator (born 1894)
- 27 October – Charles Hawtrey, actor (born 1914)

=== November ===
- 2 November – George Scott, broadcaster (born 1925)
- 4 November
  - Elinor Bellingham-Smith, painter (born 1906)
  - Henry Pelham-Clinton-Hope, 9th Duke of Newcastle, peer (born 1907)
- 6 November – Donald Wade, Baron Wade, lawyer and politician (born 1904)
- 9 November – Rosemary Timperley, author (born 1920)
- 11 November – William Ifor Jones, Welsh composer (born 1900)
- 12 November – Ursula Graham Bower, anthropologist and World War II veteran (born 1914)
- 13 November – Geddes Hyslop, architect (born 1900)
- 15 November – Mona Washbourne, actress (born 1903)
- 16 November – Jennie Lee, Baroness Lee of Asheridge, Labour politician and wife of Aneurin Bevan (born 1904)
- 18 November – Janet Gladys Aitken, aristocrat and socialite (born 1908)
- 21 November – Tom Fraser, coal miner and trade unionist (born 1911)
- 23 November – Richard Lonsdale, Army lieutenant-colonel (born 1913)
- 24 November – Mary Cavendish, Duchess of Devonshire, courtier and Mistress of the Robes (1953– 1967) (born 1895)
- 25 November – Jack Leslie, English footballer (born 1901)
- 30 November
  - Pannonica de Koenigswarter, jazz patron and writer (born 1913)
  - Margaret Mee, botanical artist (born 1909; road accident)

=== December ===
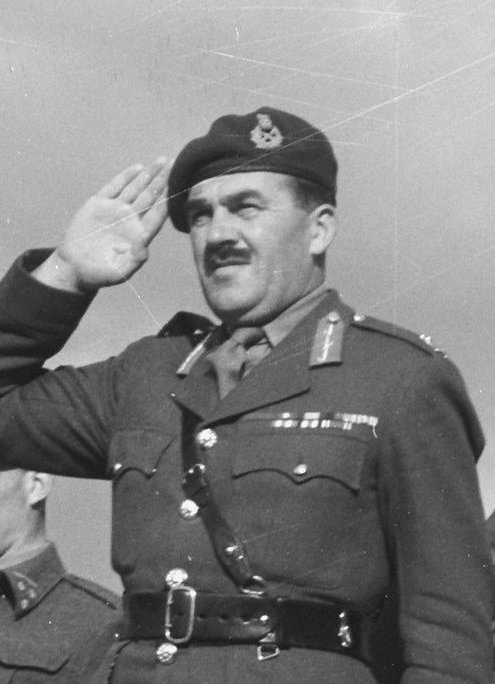
Roy Urquhart

- 1 December – Alun Oldfield-Davies, Welsh broadcaster (born 1905)
- 6 December – Derek Senior, planning expert (born 1912)
- 7 December – John Addison, composer (born 1920)
- 10 December
  - Johnny Lawrence, cricketer and coach (born 1911)
  - Dorothy de Rothschild, philanthropist and activist (born 1895)
- 11 December
  - Thomas Owen Beachcroft, writer (born 1902)
  - Frank S. Pepper, writer of comics (born 1910)
- 13 December
  - Brian Sinclair, veterinary surgeon (born 1915)
  - Roy Urquhart, major-general and World War II veteran (born 1901)
- 18 December – Adelayo Adedayo, actress
- 21 December
  - Theodora Llewelyn Davies, barrister and prison reform campaigner (born 1898)
  - Paul Jeffreys, rock musician, victim of the Lockerbie bombing (born 1952)
- 24 December – Mary Cavendish, Duchess of Devonshire, courtier (born 1895)
- 25 December – Edward Pelham-Clinton, 10th Duke of Newcastle, peer (born 1920)
- 26 December – John Loder, actor (born 1898)
- 29 December – Sir Ieuan Maddock, nuclear scientist (born 1917)

== See also ==
- 1988 in British music
- 1988 in British television
- List of British films of 1988
