= Lilias Margaret Frances, Countess Bathurst =

British newspaper publisher

The Right Honourable The Countess Bathurst
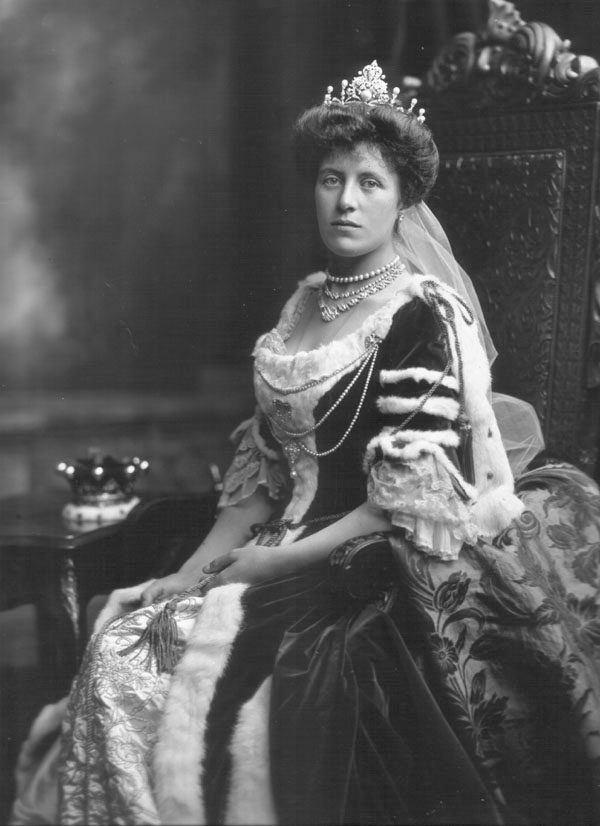
- Born: Lilias Margaret Frances Borthwick; 12 October 1871; London, England
- Died: 30 December 1965 (aged 94); Chesterton, Gloucestershire, England
- Known for: Owning The Morning Post
- Political party: Conservative
- Spouse: Seymour Bathurst (m. 1893; died 1943)
- Children: 4 (including Allen Bathurst, Lord Apsley)
- Parent(s): Algernon Borthwick, 1st Baron Glenesk; Alice Beatrice Lister

Lilias Margaret Frances, Countess Bathurst (née Borthwick, 12 October 1871 – 30 December 1965) was a British newspaper publisher who owned The Morning Post. Her father, Algernon Borthwick, 1st Baron Glenesk, owned the paper and passed control to her upon his death in 1908. She led the paper as the only female owner of a major newspaper in the world, reorienting it to focus on political and diplomatic affairs. Lady Bathurst herself was an anti-feminist, supporting movements against women's suffrage.

The paper continued to be successful and respected under her ownership; it was considered an organ of the Conservative Party and contributed to the fall of Arthur Balfour and David Lloyd George from power. Under her ownership, the paper was also known for its far-right stance, which largely reflected her own views, including expressing opinions that were antisemitic, imperialist, and militaristic. Lord Northcliffe, one of Lady Bathurst's competitors and the owner of The Times, wrote that she was "the most powerful woman in England, without exception other than royalty". She sold the paper in 1924 and lived in relative obscurity before dying in 1965 at the age of 94.

== Personal life ==
Lilias Margaret Frances Borthwick was born in Eaton Place, London, on 12 October 1871 to Algernon Borthwick, 1st Baron Glenesk, and Alice Beatrice, the daughter of Thomas Henry Lister.

She married Seymour Bathurst, 7th Earl Bathurst on 15 November 1893. They had four children; three sons and a daughter. She lived with her husband, a lieutenant-colonel in the 4th Battalion, Gloucestershire Regiment, on Saint Helena during the Second Boer War as he was in command of the garrison on the island. She wanted to purchase Longwood House, where Napoleon had lived in exile, but never did. When her father died, she inherited his house in Piccadilly but sold it after several years and moved to Bruton Street.

== The Morning Post ==
The Dictionary of National Biography (DNB) wrote that Borthwick considered her main principles to be "loyalty to the crown, to the church, and to every cause which was honourable and right". Under her ownership, The Morning Post was imperialist, protectionist, militaristic, antisemitic, and opposed Home Rule for Ireland, socialism, women's suffrage and communism. The DNB concludes the paper was "in general die-hard". The paper served as the organ of the Conservative party and was considered refined and aristocratic under her ownership. In 2014 Harry Defries wrote that "The Morning Post represented the extreme right of Conservatism and its hostility towards Jews was extreme". The paper was described in The Journal of British Studies as "the most important right-wing newspaper of the day". Bathurst also felt women were not qualified to become voters, and was broadly anti-feminist. She supported and was a member of the National Service League.

=== Editorship of Fabian Ware (1905–1911) ===
Her father, Lord Glenesk, was the owner of The Morning Post. Glenesk replaced his father, Peter Borthwick, as editor of the paper in 1852, and he purchased it in 1876. Under his ownership, the paper gradually shifted to advocate protectionist policies and supported Lord Palmerston. He trained her brother Oliver Borthwick to take over the paper, but her brother died in 1905. Upon Oliver's death, Lady Bathurst became involved in the paper.

Earlier in 1905, before Lady Bathurst became the owner, Fabian Ware was made editor of The Morning Post. Shortly after beginning work, he came into conflict with Glenesk, who thought Ware should promote tariff reform less. Ware wrote asking Lady Bathurst to intervene and threatening to resign. When Glenesk died in November 1908, she became the owner of the paper. Although Spenser Wilkinson, the paper's lead writer, attempted to turn her against Ware, Ware eventually became Lady Bathurst's favorite editor.

When Lady Bathurst took ownership of the newspaper, it was reported that she was the only female newspaper owner in London, and by some papers that she was the only woman in the world to own a major newspaper. She focused The Morning Post on political and diplomatic affairs and was a dedicated Conservative. Borthwick played a large role in dictating the paper's policies. In 1922, it was written that "no line of importance is admitted to the columns without her 'O.K'". She was described in 1977 as having remained in "constant contact with its editor and with the latest political maneuvers and events." The historian Keith M. Wilson wrote in a history of The Morning Post that under her editorship the paper grew to "reflect her own character and outlook", noting that, in addition to being closely involved with editing, Lady Bathurst often contributed articles to the paper. However, she also sought to preserve the paper to be handed over to her children and was conservative in her management, unwilling to take risks.

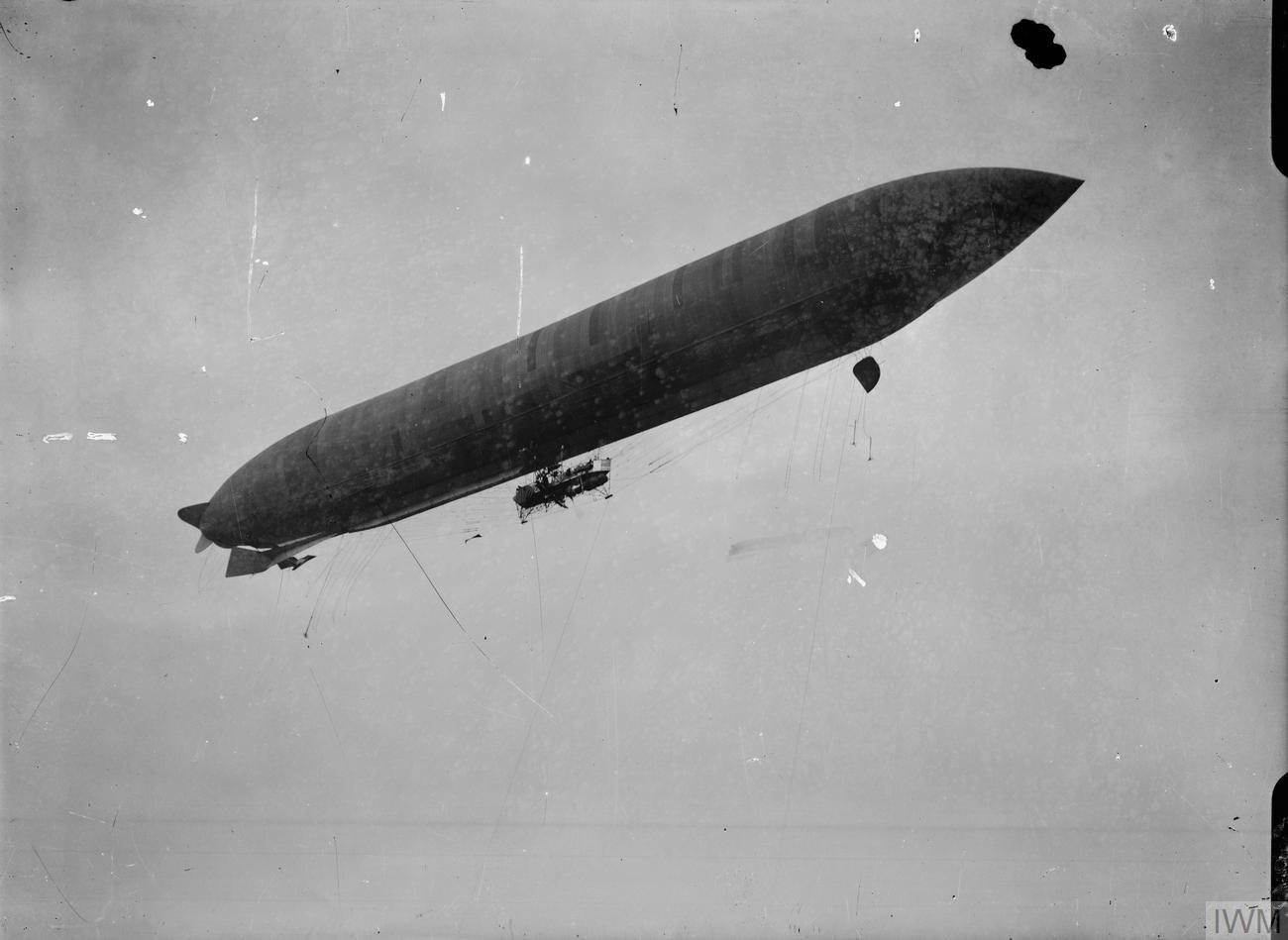
The Lebaudy airship

In response to the perceived military deficiency of the United Kingdom and Germany's successful test of a Zeppelin, The Morning Post announced the creation of a National Airship Fund on 21 June 1909. The aim of the fund was to raise £20,000 through public subscription to purchase the United Kingdom an airship. Lady Bathurst contributed the first £2,000 to the fund. In July, Ware travelled to Paris and commissioned Lebaudy Frères to build the Lebaudy Morning Post. In August, it was revealed that the Daily Mail had offered to pay for a hangar while an airship from Clément-Bayard was shipped to England. Ware rushed to ensure the Morning Post's airship arrived first, and by May 1910 he began helping plan the airship's route to England. However, on 16 October 1910, the Clément-Bayard No.2, sponsored by The Daily Mail, arrived in England. The War Office purchased the airship and the National Airship Fund was left out of negotiations. The airship commissioned by The Morning Post was damaged when it arrived in England ten days after the Clément-Bayard No.2, its hangar was too small, and it crashed on its first test flight. Ware was accused by H. Massac Buist and L. J. Bathurst, the paper's manager and Lady Bathurst's brother-in-law, of financial mismanagement and poorly managing the paper. After threatening to sue L. J. Bathurst over libel, he was given £3,000 and agreed to retire. His retirement was announced on 14 June 1911.

=== Editorship of H. A. Gwynne (1911–1924) ===
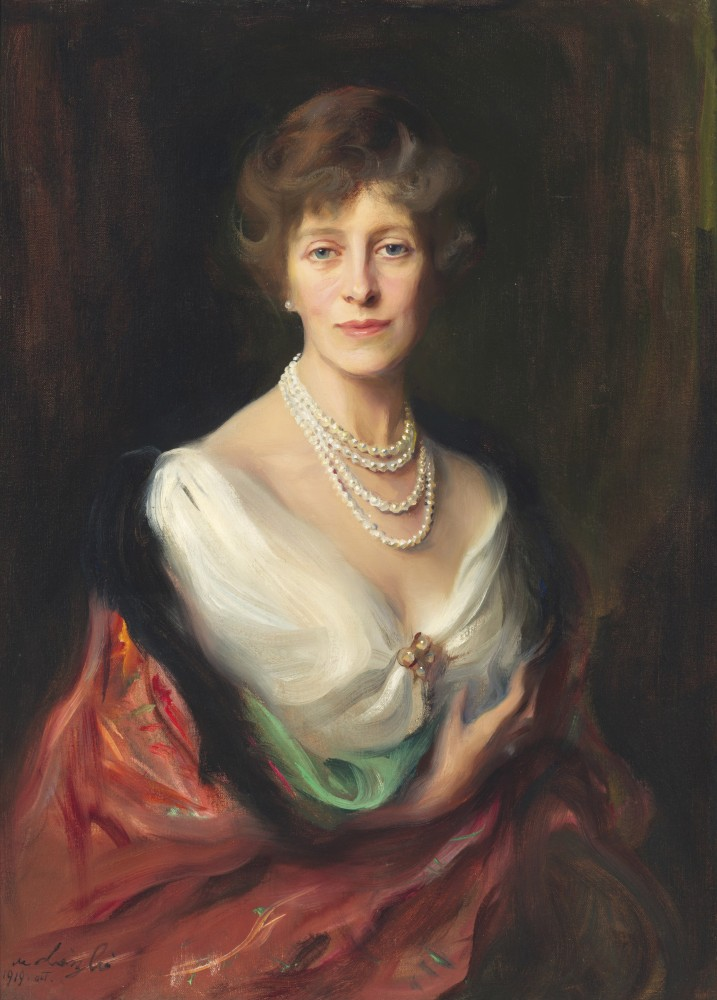
Lady Bathurst in 1919, by Philip de László

Upon the recommendation of Rudyard Kipling, Lady Bathurst appointed H. A. Gwynne editor of the paper in 1911. She stayed informed about important matters of the paper and generally supported Gwynne. Her father had been very successful running the paper; he developed a system to accept payment for coverage in social columns that was earning an estimated $500,000 per year for the paper by 1914. That year, The New York Times described the Morning Post under his control as "a capably conducted newspaper in all respects, conservative in its methods, and retaining possibly more editorial influence than any other London newspaper". The New York Times considered that Lady Bathurst ran the paper "with a success equal to her fathers".

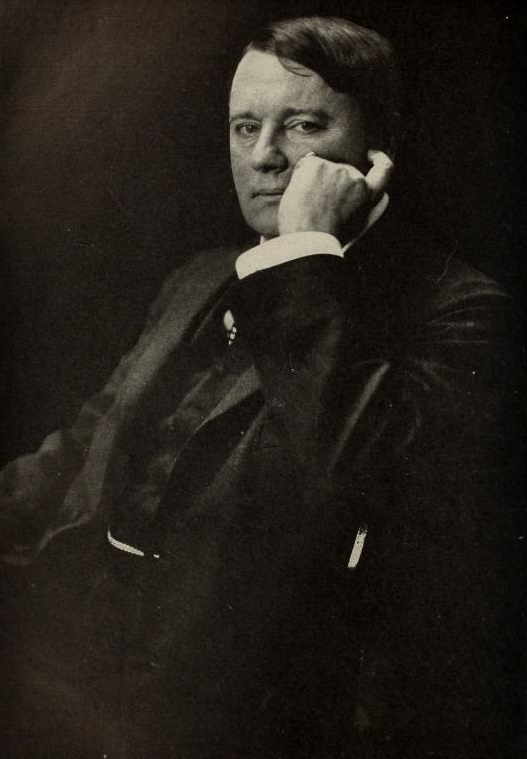
Alfred Harmsworth

In May 1914 Alfred Harmsworth, 1st Viscount Northcliffe, the owner of The Times, reduced the price of his newspapers to one penny, beginning a 'newspaper war' with The Morning Post, The Telegraph, and The Standard, which all published at that price. It was thought that The Morning Post had the weakest hold on circulation, and would be targeted by Lord Northcliffe. He wrote that the Post was "a paper which has the unique distinction of voicing the views of a very gifted lady". The war began with advertisements published in the papers. Borthwick refused to allow The Times to advertise their price reduction in The Morning Post. She continued to fight with Northcliffe for circulation for years.

Borthwick was briefly a nurse in France during the First World War and helped various war charities. Shortly after the war began, she temporarily stopped taking a salary from the paper while it was in dire financial straits. She also refused to fund increased coverage of the war through taking out a loan, considering the move too risky. In 1918 Gwynne and Charles à Court Repington, the war correspondent for The Morning Post during the conflict, were fined $500 each for publishing an article that criticised the Lloyd George ministry. Lady Bathurst supported Repington and Gwynne for publishing the story. In 1920, she founded the British League of Help for the Devastated Areas of France and Belgium.

In July 1920, The Morning Post published The Protocols of the Elders of Zion, a fabricated antisemitic text purporting to describe a Jewish plan for global domination, with no comments. H. A. Gwynne had sent the document to Lady Bathurst before publication, and she had suggested collaborating with The Times in publishing them. However, Wilson suggests that Gwynne had deceived Lady Bathurst over the document's authenticity.

In a 1922 article, The Outlook called her "the world's greatest woman newspaper owner". Lord Northcliffe called her "the most powerful woman in England, without exception other than royalty". In 1922, Lord Midleton was offended by a story he read in the newspaper. He accosted Lady Bathurst, and she refused to apologise. Midleton told her that if her husband had been the owner of the paper, he would have "called him out and shot him." The disagreement soon came up in the House of Lords, where the Lord Chancellor, Lord Birkenhead, sided against Bathurst. When David Lloyd George fell from power in late 1922, Hayden Church for the McClure Newspaper Syndicate wrote that "with the exception of Andrew Bonar Law himself, and perhaps not even excepting the present Prime Minister, no single individual played a greater part in precipitating the crisis that drove David Lloyd George from office than did Lady Bathurst through her famous journal, the 'Morning Post'". She was also credited with helping decrease the power of Arthur Balfour through creating a 'Balfour Must Go' movement.

=== Sale of paper ===
Since the end of the war, the paper had not been financially performing as well as Lady Bathurst had hoped. Attempts at increasing its profits—and therefore her own income—were unsuccessful. After August 1922, the paper's finances were continually overdrawn, and Lady Bathurst herself was in increasingly poor financial condition. Coupled with a dramatic fall in circulation, in December 1922 she decided to sell the paper, assigning her son Allen Bathurst, Lord Apsley, to handle the negotiations. Negotiations with Rupert E. Beckett of The Yorkshire Post began in 1923, but were unsuccessful. On 7 April 1924 the paper was sold to Alan Percy, 8th Duke of Northumberland, and a consortium of prominent Conservatives for £500,000 (£26,281,808 in 2025).

== Later life and death ==
After selling the paper she lived in relative obscurity, helping her son politically. Allen Bathurst died in 1942 and Seymour Bathurst the following year. She died on 30 December 1965 at the age of 94 in Chesterton, Gloucestershire.

== Bibliography ==
- Byrne, Sandi (2007). The Unbearable Saki: The Work of H. H. Munro. OUP. ISBN 978-0-19-922605-4.
- Carruthers, Annette; Greensted, Mary; Roscoe, Barley (2019). Ernest Gimson: Arts & Crafts Designer and Architect. Yale University Press. ISBN 978-0-300-24626-1.
- Crawford, Elizabeth (2003). The Women's Suffrage Movement: A Reference Guide 1866-1928. Routledge. ISBN 978-1-135-43402-1.
- Defries, Harry (2014). Conservative Party Attitudes to Jews 1900-1950. Routledge. ISBN 978-1-135-28462-6.
- Edmond, Martin (2017). The Expatriates. Bridget Williams Books. ISBN 978-1-988533-14-8.
- Hoffman, Helen (September–December 1922). "Lady Bathurst, The World's Greatest Woman Newspaper Owner". The Outlook. Vol. 132. p. 756.
- Leung, H.; Hendley, M.; Compton, R.; Haley, B. (2009). Imagining Globalization: Language, Identities, and Boundaries. Springer. ISBN 978-0-230-10158-6.
- Paris, Michael (1992). Winged Warfare: The Literature and Theory of Aerial Warfare in Britain, 1859-1917. Manchester University Press. ISBN 978-0-7190-3694-1.
- Potter, Simon James (2003). News and the British World: The Emergence of an Imperial Press System, 1876–1922. Clarendon. ISBN 9780199265121.
- Thompson, Andrew S. (2014). Imperial Britain: The Empire in British Politics, c. 1880-1932. Routledge. ISBN 978-1-317-88253-4.
- Wilson, Keith M. (1990). A Study in the History and Politics of The Morning Post, 1905–1926. E. Mellen Press. ISBN 9780889465039.
