= Howell Gwynne =

Howell Gwynne may refer to:

- Howell Arthur Gwynne (1865–1950), British author, editor of the London Morning Post 1911–1937
- Howell Gwynne (MP) (1718–1780), British politician, MP for Radnorshire 1755–61, and Old Sarum 176–68
