= Meresia Nevill =

Primrose League leading member

- Born: 14 December 1849; Upper Grosvenor Street
- Died: 26 October 1918 (aged 68); Sloane Gardens
- Political party: Primrose League

Meresia Nevill (1849–1918) was a British Conservative who was one of the Primrose League's leading advocates. The league would influence elections and with her as treasurer it raised money to assist the First World War effort.

== Life ==
Nevill was born after two years of her parents' marriage as their eldest child. Her mother was Lady Dorothy Nevill and her father and her mother's cousin was Reginald Henry Nevill (d. 1878). Her mother was twenty years younger than her father and they were married after a minor scandal implicated her mother. Her grandfathers were Horatio Walpole, third earl of Orford and the 1st Earl of Abergavenny. Her parents had six children, but only three of her siblings survived their childhood.

She was brought up at Dangstein House in West Sussex where she was schooled by a governess. Their large home was in the Corinthian style and the gardens were designed by her mother on their estate of over 800 hectares. Her home included walled gardens and separate heated glasshouses for palms, peaches, ferns, three vineries, orchid houses, a double aviary. These were supplemented by a pheasantry and two pigeon and a small aviary.

In 1871 she was presented at court where the involuntary movements that she had all her life became apparent. She was described as "manly" and she did not enjoy being a débutante. However she was rich and she did not need to marry.

Her mother was one of the founding members of the Primrose League which was a popular society of people who supported the Conservative party. Women had been initially included in the league but later a Ladies' Branch and Ladies' Grand Council were formed in March 1885 at the home of Lady Borthwick (afterwards Lady Glenesk) in Piccadilly. It was said that "The Primrose League was the first political organisation to give women the same status and responsibilities as men".

Lady Borthwick; the Dowager Duchess of Marlborough became the first president and committee included her mother, Lady Wimborne; Lady Randolph Churchill; Lady Charles Beresford; the Dowager Marchioness of Waterford; Julia, Marchioness of Tweeddale; the Honorable Lady Campbell (later Lady Blythswood); the Honorable Mrs Armitage; Julia, Countess of Jersey; Mrs (subsequently Lady) Hardman; Lady Dorothy Nevill. Meresia became the first secretary and only other members of the committee who did not have a title was the Dutch activist Clarissa Bischoffsheim.

She was not just her mothers assistant, she took to public speaking in support of the Primrose League. The league became important when the Corrupt Practices Act 1883 made it illegal for political parties or candidates to hire people to lobby voters on the day of a ballot. The act forbade paid canvassers but it did not outlaw volunteers.

Nevill became the league's treasurer and in time she was a vice-president. During the First World War the league raised money for the war effort. She died in 1918 in Sloane Square in London.
