= Keith M. Wilson =

British historian and author

Keith Malcolm Wilson (1944 - 9 February 2018) was a historian and author who was Professor of International Politics in the School of History at the University of Leeds.

Wilson received a DPhil for his thesis The role and influence of the professional advisers to the Foreign Office on the making of British foreign policy from December 1905 to August 1914. He has written a number of books on British foreign policy during the 19th and 20th century.

== Works ==
=== Books ===
- Imperialism and Nationalism in the Middle East: The Anglo-Egyptian Experience, 1882-1982. London, England: Mansell Pub, 1983. ISBN 978-0-7201-1682-3
  - Review, The Middle East Journal, Winter, 1986, vol. 40, no. 1, p. 149
  - Review, English Historical Review, Apr., 1986, vol. 101, no. 399, p. 546-547
  - Review, Middle Eastern Studies, Jul., 1984, vol. 20, no. 3, p. 400-402
- The Policy of the Entente: The Determinants of British Foreign Policy, 1904-1914 Cambridge University Press, 1985. ISBN 978-0-521-30195-4
  - Review, The American Historical Review, Jun., 1986, vol. 91, no. 3, p. 669-670
  - Review, English Historical Review, Apr., 1986, vol. 101, no. 399, p. 454-457
  - Review, Albion: A Quarterly Journal Concerned with British Studies, Summer, 1986, vol. 18, no. 2, p. 339-341
- Empire and Continent: Studies in British Foreign Policy from the 1880s to the First World War. London: Mansell Pub, 1987. ISBN 978-0-7201-1859-9
  - Review, Bulletin of the School of Oriental and African Studies, University of London, 1989, vol. 52, no. 2, p. 375-376
- The Rasp of War: The Letters of H. A. Gwynne to the Countess Bathurst, 1914-1918 (eds), Sidgwick & Jackson, 1988
- A Study in the History and Politics of The "Morning Post", 1905-1926 (Lewiston: E. Mellen Press, 1990) ISBN 978-0-88946-450-6
- British Foreign Secretaries and Foreign Policy / From Crimean War to First World War. London: Croom Helm, 1986 ISBN 978-0-7099-3678-7
  - Review, English Historical Review, Oct., 1989, vol. 104, no. 413, p. 1059–1061
  - Review, Victorian Studies, Winter, 1989, vol. 32, no. 2, p. 271-272
- Channel Tunnel Visions, 1850-1945: Dreams and Nightmares. Bloomsbury Academic, 1994
- Decisions for War, 1914. (eds) New York: St. Martin's Press, 1995. ISBN 978-0-312-12652-0
- Forging the Collective Memory: Government and International Historians Through Two World Wars. (eds) Providence: Berghahn Books, 1996. ISBN 978-1-57181-862-1
- The International Impact of the Boer War. New York: Palgrave, 2001. ISBN 978-1-902683-19-5
- Problems and possibilities: exercises in statesmanship, 1814-1918. Tempus, 2003.
- The Limits of Eurocentricity: Imperial British Foreign and Defence Policy in the Early Twentieth Century. Analecta Isisiana, 90. Istanbul: Isis Press, 2006. ISBN 978-975-428-331-0
- The Political Re-Education of Germany and her Allies: After World War II. Routledge, 2019

=== Articles ===
- The "Protocols of Zion" and the "Morning Post," 1919-1920 in Patterns of Prejudice, Vol. 19, No. 3 (July 1985), pp. 5–14
- "The Channel Tunnel Question at the Committee of Imperial Defence. 1990." Journal of strategic studies, (1990) p. 99-125.
