= Lady Dorothy Nevill =

English writer and horticulturist (1826–1913)

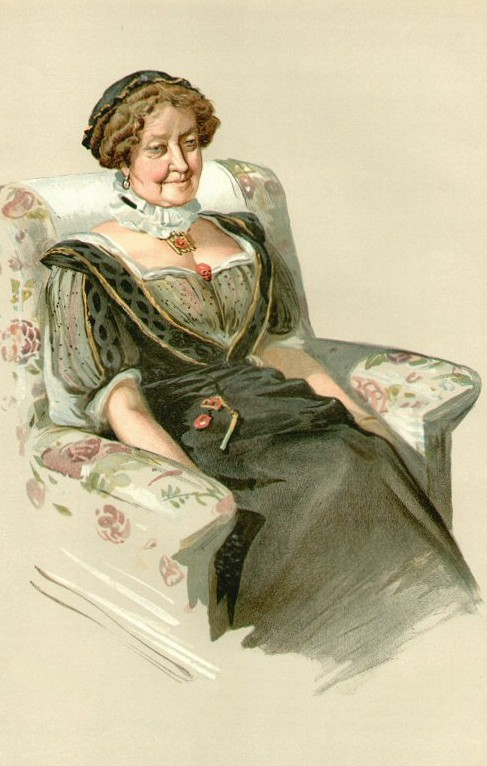
- Born: Lady Dorothy Fanny Nevill; 1 April 1826; Mayfair, London, England
- Died: 24 March 1913 (aged 86); Mayfair, London, England
- Occupations: writer, hostess, horticulturist, and plant collector
- Father: Horatio Walpole, 3rd Earl of Orford
- Relatives: William Augustus Fawkener (grandfather); Meresia Nevill (daughter)

Lady Dorothy Fanny Nevill (née Walpole; 1 April 1826 – 24 March 1913) was an English writer, hostess, horticulturist, and plant collector from the Walpole and Nevill families. She was a founding member of the Conservative Primrose League, collected art, and cultivated a social network of talented friends including writers, artists, and politicians.

== Family and education ==
Nevill was born at 2 Berkeley Square, one of five children of Horatio Walpole, 3rd Earl of Orford (1783–1858) and Mary Fawkener, daughter of William Augustus Fawkener, sometime envoy extraordinary at St Petersburg and close friend of Catherine II of Russia. Nevill was tutored by a governess in French, Greek, Italian and Latin.

== Scandal and marriage ==
In 1847, Nevill was embroiled in a scandal when she was linked with George Smythe, MP, heir to a peerage. Smythe refused to marry her and this destroyed her reputation.

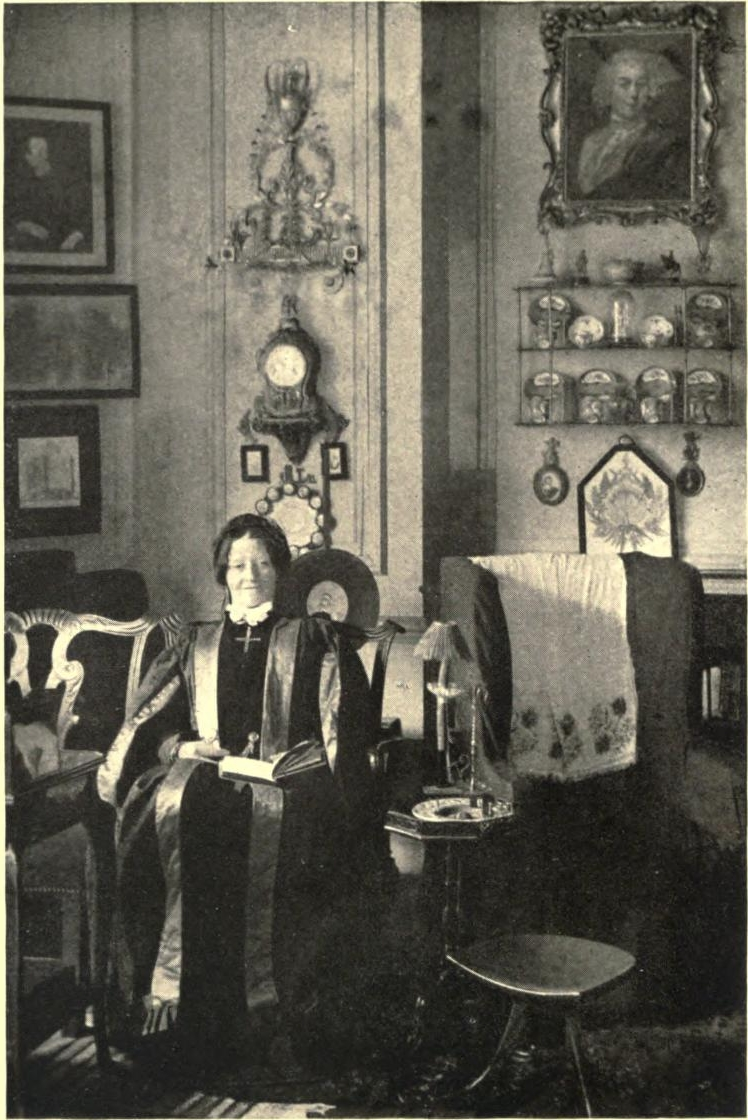
At her home on Charles Street, London

Later in 1847, Nevill married a cousin twenty years her senior. Her husband was Reginald Henry Nevill (d. 1878), a grandson of the 1st Earl of Abergavenny. Their marriage produced six children, only four of whom survived beyond childhood including Meresia Nevill.

Nevill travelled extensively and cultivated a large circle of literary and artistic friends, with a sprinkling of politicians, including James McNeill Whistler, Richard Cobden, Joseph Chamberlain and Benjamin Disraeli, whom she greatly admired. She was however, never received by Queen Victoria.

== Work as a horticulturist ==
In 1851 the Nevills acquired a large Sussex property, 'Dangstein' near Rogate. Dorothy Nevill turned the estate garden into a horticultural landmark. She employed 34 gardeners in her cultivation of orchids, nepenthes, and other tropical plants.

Her exotic plants were housed in seventeen conservatories and were the subject of numerous articles in journals on horticulture. Through her plants, Nevill became friendly with both William and Joseph Hooker at Kew. She supplied Charles Darwin with rare plants for his researches. Dorothy was particularly known as an orchid grower, leading to a correspondence with Darwin that began in November 1861 when he wrote to ask for specimens to further his research towards his pamphlet on orchids. Nevill was delighted to comply, and was duly acknowledged with a presentation copy.

She kept exotic birds and mammals on the estate, farmed silkworms and maintained a museum of her collections. After her husband's death, he left all his money to their surviving children to curtail her expenditures. Nevill moved to 'Stillyans' near Heathfield in Sussex, which she rented from one of her botanist friends, Robert Hogg.

The breadth of her interests was summarized by Virginia Woolf in a sketch of her life:

Now she illuminated leaves which had been macerated to skeletons; now she interested herself in improving the breed of donkeys; next she took up the cause of silkworms, almost threatened Australia with a plague of them, and "actually succeeded in obtaining enough silk to make a dress"; again she was the first to discover that wood, gone green with decay, can be made, at some expense, into little boxes; she went into the question of funguses and established the virtues of the neglected English truffle; she imported rare fish; spent a great deal of energy in vainly trying to induce storks and Cornish choughs to breed in Sussex; painted on china; emblazoned heraldic arms, and, attaching whistles to the tails of pigeons, produced wonderful effects "as of an aerial orchestra" when they flew through the air. To the Duchess of Somerset belongs the credit of investigating the proper way of cooking guinea-pigs; but Lady Dorothy was one of the first to serve up a dish of these little creatures at luncheon in Charles Street.

== Collector ==
In the 1860s Lady Dorothy had established a large ceramic collection including Sèvres porcelain objects. She knew Napoleon III, Empress Eugénie, Princess Mathilde and Prince Demidoff. After the Franco-Prussian War she regularly visited Paris for her collections.

== Salon hostess ==
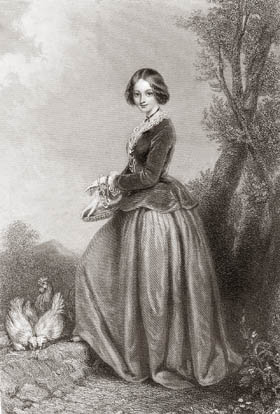
Lady Dorothy in 1852

Nevill was a noted conversationalist - "The real art of conversation is not only to say the right thing at the right place, but to leave unsaid the wrong thing at the tempting moment." - and leading society hostess. Her salons attracted celebrities and politicians. She served on the first committee of the Primrose League.

== Memoirist ==
Nevill wrote a number of volumes of memoirs:

- Reminiscences (1906)
- Leaves from the Notebooks of Lady Dorothy Nevill (1907)
- Under Five Reigns (1910)
- My Own Times (1912).
- Mannington and the Walpoles, Earls of Orford (1894)

== Death ==
Lady Dorothy died in 1913 at her home at 45 Charles Street, Mayfair, where a memorial plaque was unveiled on 8 September 1998. It is a short walk to the house on Berkeley Square where she had been born nearly 88 years prior.

== Children and legacy ==
Her son, Ralph Nevill, wrote Life and Letters of Lady Dorothy Nevill (1919). Her daughter, Meresia Nevill was also a leading worker for the Primrose League. She served for many years as treasurer of the Ladies' Grand Council and died in London on 26 October 1918.
