= Primrose Club =

Mid-18th century London gentlemen's club

Coordinates: 51°30′22.56″N 0°8′26.34″W

The Primrose Club was a short-lived political London gentlemen's club founded in 1886 and located at 4-5 Park Place, St. James's. It was aligned to the Conservative party, with members having to pledge support. It was launched as a bid to combine the explosion of the popularity of clubs in London at the end of the nineteenth century with the phenomenal success of the Conservative-aligned Primrose League.

At first it proved highly successful, with Whitaker's Almanack reporting 6,500 members, but within a decade this had already shrunk to 5,500, and by 1910 it had just 350 members, and was disbanded shortly afterwards.

== See also ==
- List of London's gentlemen's clubs
