= Edmund Beale Sargant =

British colonial administrator

Edmund Beale Sargant (19 March 1855 – 1 October 1938) was a colonial administrator in the British Empire, particularly notable for his policy of introducing English in the South African educational system in the first years of the twentieth century, as Director of Education for the Transvaal and Orange River Colony under Alfred Milner, and in the aftermath of the Second Boer War. The Sargant Report (1905) was important for the future of education in the Transvaal.

Sargant was educated at Rugby School and Trinity College, Cambridge. He was made director of education in South Africa in 1897. Sargant founded and funded a shortlived school in Hackney, London, called 'School Field'. Its purpose was to demonstrate that children could be given a better education if their teachers were not bound by a narrow curriculum and were not required to focus on success in attainment tests in order to ensure school funding.

He was also a poet, appearing in particular in the first of the Georgian Poetry anthologies.

== Works ==
- A Guide Book to Books (1891), compendium of book titles, with Bernhard Whishaw
- Report on Native Education in South Africa (1908) Parliamentary Paper
- The Casket Songs (1912) poems
- The Country’s Call (1914) with Marie Sargant
- More Songs by the Wayside (1934) poems
