= Spenser Wilkinson =

English writer (1853–1937)

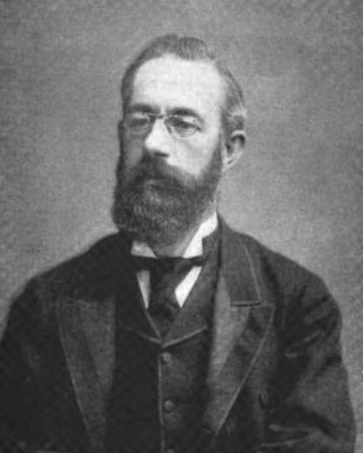
- In The Sketch, 2 December 1896
- Born: Henry Spenser Wilkinson; 1 May 1853; Hulme, England
- Died: 31 January 1937 (aged 83); Oxford, England
- Education: Owens College; Merton College, Oxford
- Occupations: Academic, writer, critic
- Spouse: Victoria Crowe (m. 1888)
- Children: 6

Henry Spenser Wilkinson (1 May 1853 – 31 January 1937) was the first Chichele Professor of Military History at Oxford University. While he was an English writer known primarily for his work on military subjects, he had wide interests. Earlier in his career he was the drama critic for London's Morning Post.

== Early life and education ==
The second son of Thomas Read Wilkinson, a banker, and his wife Emma Wolfenden, he was born in Hulme. He was educated at Owens College, Manchester and studied at Merton College, Oxford in 1873–1878. While at Oxford, he became interested in armies and began his lifelong interest in military affairs. As an undergraduate, he joined the Oxford Volunteers. After Oxford, he read law at Lincoln's Inn and was called to the bar in 1880. On returning to Manchester in 1880, he took a commission in the volunteers and also founded the Manchester Tactical Society.

In 1888, Wilkinson married Victoria Crowe (1868–1929), daughter of Sir Joseph Archer Crowe and niece of the artist Eyre Crowe. Together, he and his wife had two sons and four daughters.

== Career as a journalist ==
From 1882 to 1892 he was on the staff of the Manchester Guardian, for which he wrote occasional pieces on military subjects and was sent on a short-term assignment to cover Lord Wolseley's campaign in Egypt in 1883. He was made redundant in 1892 because of C.P. Scott's view that Wilkinson did not follow the principles of the Liberal Party. Through his friendship with Lord Roberts, Wilkinson obtained a post on the staff of the London Morning Post from 1895 to 1914.

Convinced as early as 1874 that Great Britain was inadequately armed, he increasingly devoted his attention to the subject of the national defence. He became a key figure in the founding of the Navy League of Great Britain in 1894 and a serious student of the German military philosopher Carl von Clausewitz. During the early months of the Boer War (1899–1900) and made remarkably accurate forecasts of military movements. Wilkinson's views on military affairs were widely influential. At the Foreign Office, Wilkinson's wife's brother, Sir Eyre Crowe, summarised much of Wilkinson's argument from his 1896 book The National Awakening in his famous 1 January 1907 memorandum on British relations with France and Germany.

== Academic career ==
Wilkinson was very well connected to key figures in politics and in the armed forces as he journalist and had long hoped for an academic appointment, as his interests increasingly turned toward historical study. He was elected the first Chichele Professor of Military History in the University of Oxford and Fellow of All Souls College in 1909. During World War I he became—like Clausewitz's foremost German proponent at the time, Hans Delbrück—an energetic critic of his nation's counterproductive strategy and policy. He remained an influential voice in Britain until his death in Oxford on 31 January 1937.

== Bibliography ==
- Essays toward the Improvement of the Volunteer Forces (1886)
- The Brain of an Army (1890, 2 ed. 1895, reprinted 1913), an account of the German general staff
- Imperial Defence (1892), with Sir Charles Dilke
- The Command of the Sea (1894)
- The Brain of the Navy (1895)
- The Nation's Awakening (1896)
- British Policy in South Africa (1899)
- War and Policy (1900)
- as editor: The Nation's Need: Chapters on Education (1903)
- Britain at Bay (1909)
- Hannibal's March through the Alps (1911)
- First Lessons in War (1914)
- The French Army before Napoleon (1915)
- The Nation's Servants (1916)
- The Defence of Piedmont, 1742–1748: A Prelude to the Study of Napoleon (1927)

For on-line examples of Wilkinson's writings, see:

- Strategy in the Navy, The Morning Post, 3 August 1909. This essay is essentially an attack on the influential British naval theorist Julian Stafford Corbett's interpretation of Clausewitz and on Corbett's influence on the Royal Navy.
- Killing No Murder: An Examination of Some New Theories of War, Army Quarterly 14 (October 1927). This is a bitingly critical response to B.H. Liddell Hart's book, The Remaking of Modern Armies (London: J. Murray, 1927).

== Sources ==
- Scammell, J. M. "Spenser Wilkinson and the Defense of Britain." Journal of Military History 4 (1940): 129–142 online
- William Archer, Real Conversations (London, 1904)
- John B. Hattendorf, "The Study of War History at Oxford" in Hattendorf and Malcolm H. Murfett, eds., The Limitations of Military Power (1990).
- Jay Luvaas, The Education of an Army: British Military Thought, 1815–1940 (1965.
- A. J. A. Morris, "Wilkinson, (Henry) Spencer (1853–1937)" in Oxford Dictionary of National Biography. (2004)

Wilkinson's Papers are located at the National Army Museum, London. His correspondence with Sir Charles Dilke is in the British Library, Add MSS 43915-43916 and his Correspondence with Sir Basil Liddell Hart is at King's College London

For an extended discussion of Wilkinson, see

- Chapter 9, "Major British Military Writers," and Chapter 15, section "Wilkinson on Liddell Hart and Clausewitz," in Christopher Bassford, Clausewitz in English: The Reception of Clausewitz in Britain and America, 1815–1945 (New York: Oxford University Press, 1994).

Media offices
| Preceded by James Nicol Dunn | Editor of the Morning Post; 1905 | Succeeded by Fabian Ware |
