= Algernon Borthwick, 1st Baron Glenesk =

British journalist and politician

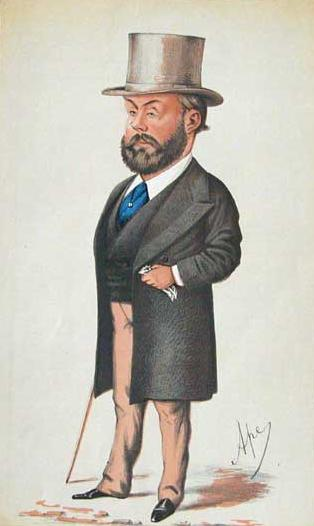
Caricature of Borthwick by Carlo Pellegrini ('Ape') in Vanity Fair, 1871

Algernon Borthwick, 1st Baron Glenesk JP (27 December 1830 – 24 November 1908), known as Sir Algernon Borthwick, Bt, between 1887 and 1895, was a British journalist and Conservative politician. He was the owner of the Morning Post (which merged with The Daily Telegraph in 1937).

== Background and education ==
Borthwick was the son of Peter Borthwick, editor of the Morning Post, and Margaret, daughter of John Colville, of Ewart, Northumberland. He was sent to King's College School.

== Career ==
Borthwick started his career in journalism in 1850 as the Morning Post's Paris correspondent. After his father's death in 1852, he became managing editor and within seven years had paid off the newspaper's financial debt to paper manufacturers Thomas Bonsor Crompton. Borthwick gave the paper "a strong political colour, Conservative, Imperialist and Protectionist ... [and the paper became] the principal organ of the fashionable world". In 1877, Borthwick succeeded in becoming the newspaper's sole proprietor and took a series of risky but ultimately highly successful financial decisions including reducing the newspaper's price from threepence to a penny which resulted in a ten-fold increase in circulation.

Borthwick was known as a conservative voice in the politics of the time and in the 1880s he switched his attention to the world of politics. In the 1880 general election, Borthwick stood unsuccessfully for Evesham as a Conservative candidate. However, the election was declared void on account of bribery of electors, causing a by-election. In April 1880, Borthwick was given a knighthood by Disraeli in Disraeli's resignation honours. In the mid-1880s, Borthwick played a role in popularizing the Primrose League, an organisation dedicated to spreading Conservative principles in the UK. In 1885, Borthwick was elected a Member of Parliament for Kensington South and became an ally of Lord Randolph Churchill. On 12 July 1887, he was created a Baronet, of Piccadilly in the Parish of St George, Hanover Square, in the County of Middlesex. On his retirement from the House of Commons in 1895, Borthwick was raised to the peerage as Baron Glenesk, of Glenesk in the County of Midlothian.

Arms of Baron Glenesk

Borthwick's political career increased the influence on the Morning Post and the newspaper soon became "one of the great organs of opinion on the Conservative side." From 1880 onwards, Borthwick handed over editorship of the newspaper to a series of editors: William Hardman, A. K. Moore, William Algernon Locker, James Nicol Dunn, and Fabian Ware. Under these editors, the literary standard of the newspaper was retained and a series of improvements were made. Borthwick's son, Oliver Borthwick (1873–1905), held a managing role in the Morning Post until his own death, predeceasing his father, in 1905 aged 32. When Algernon Borthwick himself died in 1908, proprietorship of the Morning Post passed his only surviving child, Lilias Margaret Frances Borthwick (1871–1965), who in 1893 had married Seymour Bathurst, 7th Earl Bathurst.

== Marriage and children ==
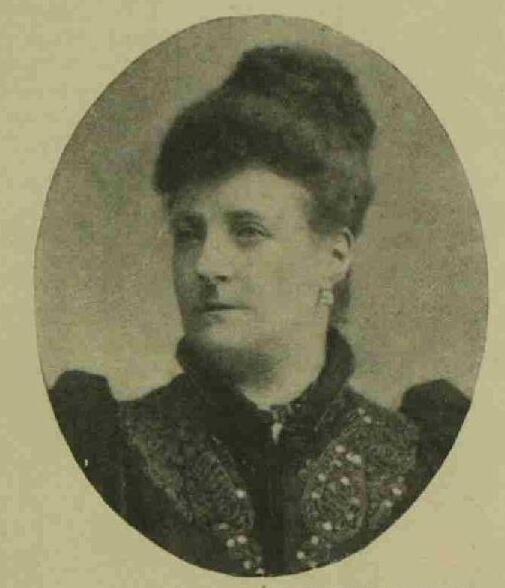
Alice Beatrice Lister

Lord Glenesk married Alice Beatrice Lister (d. 1898) on 5 April 1870. She was the daughter of the writers Thomas Henry Lister and his wife Lady Maria Theresa Villiers, daughter of George Villiers. They had two children:

- The Hon. Lilias Margaret Frances Borthwick (1871–1965), who married Seymour Bathurst, 7th Earl Bathurst, and had four children, three sons and a daughter. Lady Bathurst eventually inherited The Morning Post.
- The Hon. Oliver Borthwick (1873–1905), who predeceased his father, dying aged thirty two unmarried and without children.

Lord Glenesk died in November 1908, aged 77, when the title became extinct. Glenesk was interred in the Glenesk Mausoleum in East Finchley Cemetery. The mausoleum had been designed and built for Glenesk by Arthur Blomfield in 1899, and also held the remains of his wife, and his son, Oliver. The mausoleum was later listed Grade II on the National Heritage List for England.

Parliament of the United Kingdom
| New constituency | Member of Parliament for Kensington South; 1885–1895 | Succeeded by Lord Lovaine |
Peerage of the United Kingdom
| New creation | Baron Glenesk; 1895–1908 | Extinct |
Baronetage of the United Kingdom
| New creation | Baronet (of Heath House); 1887–1908 | Extinct |
| Preceded by Carden baronets | Borthwick baronets of Heath House; 12 July 1887 | Succeeded by Clifford baronets |
