= H. A. Gwynne =

British writer (1865–1950)

Howell Arthur Gwynne CH
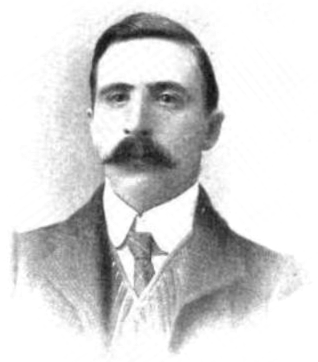
- Gwynne in The Sketch (10 January 1900)
- Born: Howell Arthur Keir Gwynne; 3 September 1865; Kilvey, Wales
- Died: 26 June 1950 (aged 84); Little Easton, England
- Occupations: Newspaper editor, author

Howell Arthur Keir Gwynne (3 September 1865 – 26 June 1950) was a Welsh author, newspaper editor of the London Morning Post from 1911 to 1937.

== Early life ==
He was the son of Richard Gwynne, a schoolmaster and his wife Charlotte Lloyd, born at Kilvey; Llewellyn Henry Gwynne was his brother. He attended Swansea Grammar School.

== Journalistic career ==
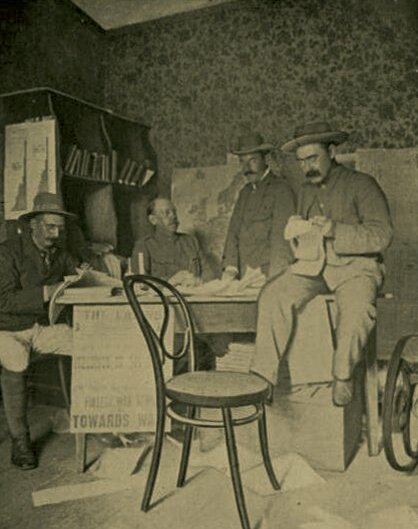
Gwynne (leftmost) with Kipling (rightmost) in South Africa

Gwynne began his career as a foreign correspondent in the Balkans, and then became the Reuters news correspondent in Romania. Early in his career, Gwynne was part of the group of journalists and writers including also Rudyard Kipling, Perceval Landon, Julian Ralph and F.W. Buxton who helped start a newspaper, The Friend, for Lord Roberts for the British troops in Bloemfontein, the newly captured capital of the Orange Free State during the Boer War. Kipling and Gwynne remained friends for the rest of Kipling's life. Gwynne married Edith Douglas, daughter of Thomas Ash Lane, in 1907. In 1911, Gwynne became editor of The Morning Post. The owner of the paper was Lilias, Countess Bathurst (1871–1965), a.k.a. Lady Bathurst, wife of Seymour Henry Bathurst, 7th Earl Bathurst (1864–1943). The Bathursts sold the paper in 1924. Gwynne held conservative, imperialist and anti-Zionist political views, and used his editorship of the Morning Post to promote these positions. Gwynne was a strong supporter of the British war effort in the First World War, supporting conscription and championing Lord Kitchener as the military leader that Gwynne believed was best qualified to help Britain win the war. Gwynne also befriended Edward Carson, whose support for Irish Unionism Gwynne shared. After the Russian Revolution, Gwynne became an outspoken opponent of Communism.

Later, "[l]ike many another elderly Conservatives in the nineteen-twenties [Kipling] reacted at the news of events in Ireland, Egypt, India, by moving further to the right in politics". Gwynne's Post "continued to fight its rearguard action, and [Kipling] continued to urge Gwynne to take stronger stands". Kipling "was for years closely associated with the editorial policy of the Post and on terms of friendship with Lady Bathurst ..., [and] spent many week-ends at Cirencester". Gwynne's relationship with Kipling remained close throughout the latter's life — he was a pallbearer at Kipling's burial in Poet's Corner at Westminster Abbey in 1936.

Gwynne died at his home in Little Easton, Essex on 26 June 1950.

== Gwynne and The Protocols of the Elders of Zion ==
In 1920, Gwynne caused controversy when he wrote an introduction to a book titled The Cause of World Unrest. Gwynne's introduction argued that there was a Jewish conspiracy to promote Communism. Gwynne cited the book The Protocols of the Elders of Zion (later exposed as a forgery) in his introduction. While Gwynne did not take a stance on whether The Protocols were authentic or not, he did claim that "the Jewish Bolsheviks" in Russia were "carrying out almost to the letter" the program outlined in The Protocols. Gwynne's articles linking Jews and Communism resulted in him receiving a letter of complaint from the Jewish journalist Leopold Greenberg, who accused Gwynne of promoting Antisemitism.

== Works ==
- The Army on Itself (1904)
- The Cause of World Unrest (1920) (editor), collection of a series of Post articles based on the so-called Protocols of the Elders of Zion
- The Will and the Bill (1923)

Media offices
Preceded by Fabian Ware	Editor of the Morning Post; 1911–1937	Succeeded by Position abolished
