= The Morning Post (London) =

London newspaper (1772–1937)

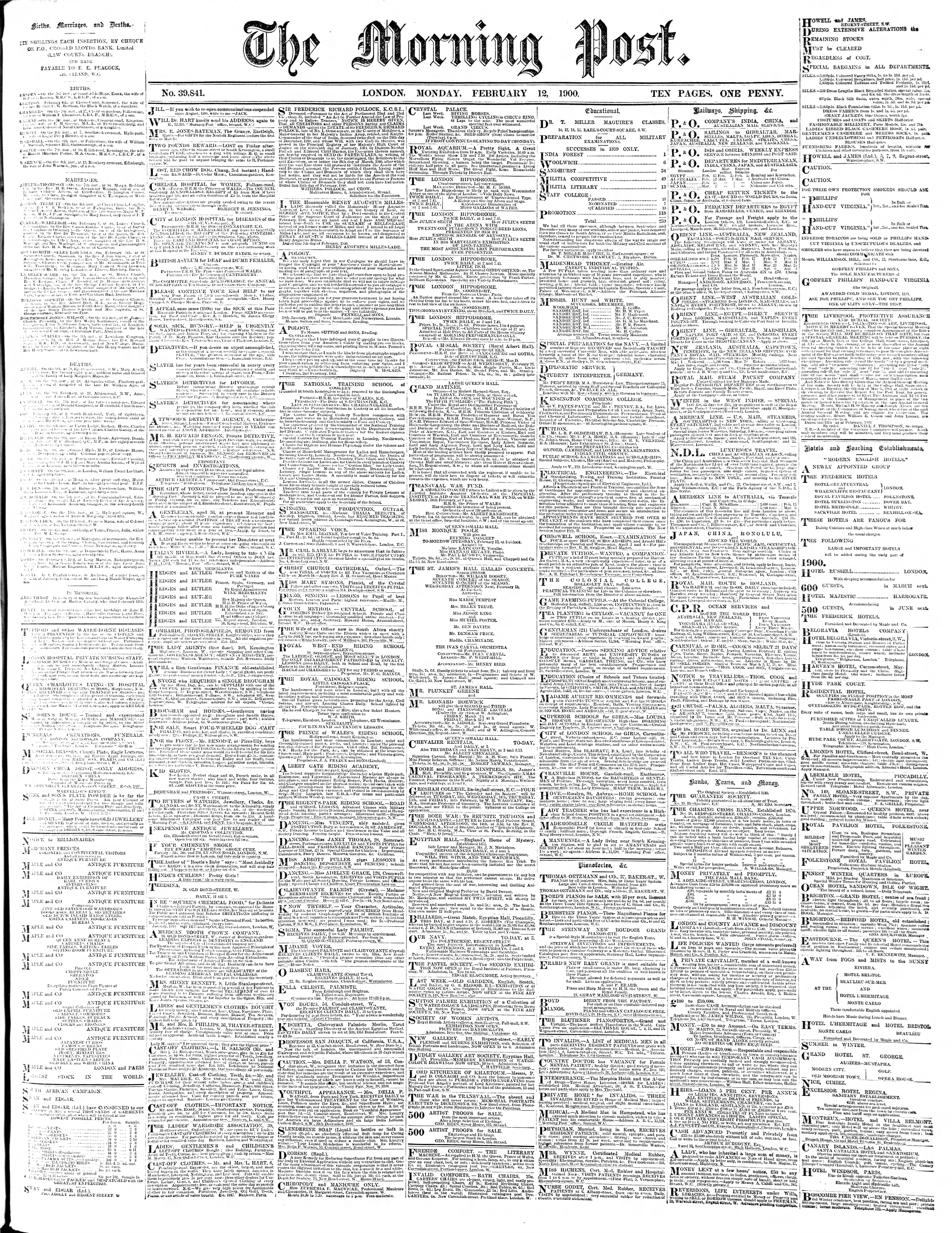
The Morning Post

The Morning Post was a conservative daily newspaper published in London from 1772 to 1937, when it was acquired by The Daily Telegraph.

== History ==
The paper was founded by John Bell. According to historian Robert Darnton, The Morning Post scandal sheet consisted of paragraph-long news snippets, much of it false. Its original editor, the Reverend Sir Henry Bate Dudley, earned himself nicknames such as "Reverend Bruiser" or "The Fighting Parson", and was soon replaced by an even more vitriolic editor, Reverend William Jackson, also known as "Dr. Viper".

Originally a Whig paper, it was purchased by Daniel Stuart in 1795, who made it into a moderate Tory organ. A number of well-known writers contributed, including Samuel Taylor Coleridge, Charles Lamb, James Mackintosh, Robert Southey, Mary Robinson, and William Wordsworth. In the seven years of Stuart's proprietorship, the paper's circulation rose from 350 to over 4,000.

From 1803 until his death in 1833, the owner and editor of the Post was Nicholas Byrne; his son William Pitt Byrne later held these roles.

Later, in 1849, the paper was acquired by Lancashire papermaker T. B. Crompton. In 1848 he hired Peter Borthwick, a Scot who had been a Conservative MP for Evesham (1835–1847), as editor. When Peter died in 1852, his son Algernon took over. During the 1850s, the Post was very closely associated with the Palmerston ministry.

With the aid of Andrew Montagu, Borthwick purchased the Post in 1876. His son Oliver (1873–1905) was business manager and editor, but died young, and upon the father's death in 1908 control went to his daughter Lilias Borthwick (1871–1965), wife of Seymour Henry Bathurst, 7th Earl Bathurst (1864–1943). In 1881, the paper appointed the first woman war correspondent when it sent Lady Florence Dixie to South Africa to cover the First Boer War.

The paper was noted for its attentions to the activities of the powerful and wealthy, its interest in foreign affairs, and in literary and artistic events. It began regular printing of notices of plays, concerts, and operas in the early 20th century, and is said to have been the first daily paper in London to do this. Arthur Hervey (1855–1922) was the paper's music critic between 1892 and 1908.

Beginning in 1900, the Australian politician Alfred Deakin wrote anonymous commentaries on Australian politics for the paper, continuing even when he had become Prime Minister.

Maurice Baring was a foreign correspondent for the paper, reporting from Manchuria, Russia and Constantinople between 1904 and 1909. He was war correspondent with Russian forces during the Russo-Japanese War (1904–1905). Also, Harold Williams started to write from Russia.

Howell Arthur Gwynne took over as editor in 1910.

=== Controversial publications ===
Upon General Reginald Dyer's return to India in 1920, after his role in the Jallianwala Bagh massacre in Amritsar, the Morning Post collected and presented £26,317 to him, along with a golden sword and the title "Defender of the Empire" and "the man who saved India". The editor of the Morning Post had received waves of letters containing contributions. The Morning Post received criticism during the sittings of the Hunter commission investigating the massacre as not being impartial.

The paper gained notoriety in 1920, after it ran a series of 17 or 18 articles based on The Protocols of the Elders of Zion, a text previously published in Russian by Sergei Nilus as the final chapter (Chapter XII), of his book Velikoye v malom i antikhrist kak blizkaya politicheskaya vozmozhnost'. Zapiski pravoslavnogo veruyushchego ("The Great within the Small and Antichrist, an Imminent Political Possibility. Notes of an Orthodox Believer"). It is widely held that Victor E. Marsden, the paper's Russian desk correspondent, used the copy of this rare book in the British Museum to translate the last chapter for the paper. Some have questioned that because the anonymous 1923 pamphlet crediting Marsden as the translator in its preface appeared three years after Marsden's death on 28 October 1920.

The articles were subsequently collected and formed the basis of the book The Cause of World Unrest, to which half the paper's staff contributed, as well as George Shanks and Nesta Webster. However, credit for the compilation was ascribed principally to the paper's editor, H.A. Gwynne. The book further denounced international Jewry, and cultural and social dissolution in the Christian nations.

=== Final years ===
The Bathursts sold the paper to a consortium headed by the Duke of Northumberland in 1924. After Adolf Hitler's rise to power in 1933, it was one of the few newspapers in Europe to immediately recognize that Nazi Germany would try to "seek a solution to difficulties at home with adventures abroad." In 1937, the Morning Post was sold to the Daily Telegraph, which was owned by William Berry. The Post did not remain a separate title, and it was absorbed into the Telegraph.

== Editors ==
- 1803–33: Nicholas Byrne
- 1849–52: Peter Borthwick
- 1852–76: Algernon Borthwick
- 1897: James Nicol Dunn
- 1905: Spenser Wilkinson
- 1905: Fabian Ware
- 1910–37: Howell Arthur Gwynne

== Sources ==
- Hindle, Wilfrid. (1937). 'The Morning Post,' 1772–1937: Portrait of a Newspaper. London: Routledge. OCLC 59113358; re-published in 1974, Google Books 'The Morning Post,' 1772–1937: Portrait of a Newspaper. Westport, Connecticut: Greenwood Publishing Group. ISBN 0-8371-7243-8
- Preziosi, Giovanni. (1943). Giudaismo, Bolscevismo, Plutocrazia, Massoneria. Milan: Arnoldo Mondadori Editore. OCLC 13235772
