= Thomas Kellock =

British judge and politician (1923–1993)

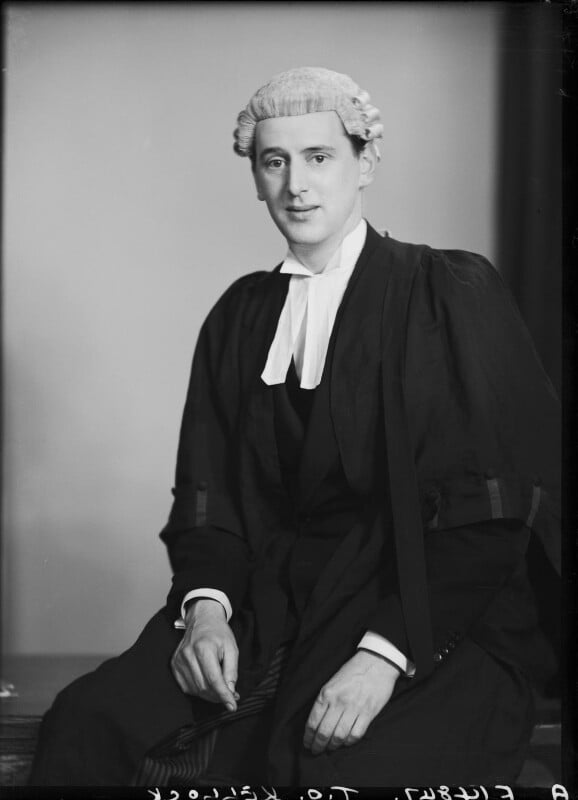
Kellock in 1952

Thomas Oslaf Kellock QC (4 July 1923 – 12 January 1993), was a British judge, Liberal Party politician and leading figure in the Anti-Apartheid Movement.

== Background ==
He was the son of surgeon Thomas Herbert Kellock of Cambridge and Margaret Brooke. He was educated at Rugby School and Clare College, Cambridge. In 1967 he married Jane Ursula Symonds.

== Professional career ==
He was barrister and a member of the chambers of former Liberal MP Dingle Foot.

== Political career ==
He was elected a member of the Liberal Party council. He was Liberal candidate for the Torquay division of Devon at the 1959 General Election. He was Chairman of the Anti-Apartheid Movement from 1963–65. He was Liberal candidate for the Kensington South division at the 1966 General Election. He was Liberal candidate for the Kensington South division at the 1968 Kensington South by-election. He was Liberal candidate for the Harwich division of Essex at the October 1974 General Election. He did not stand for parliament again. He was actively involved in Liberal International as Chairman of the British section.

=== Election results ===
General Election 1959: Torquay
Party	Candidate	Votes	%	±%
Conservative	Frederic Bennett	29,527	56.79	
Labour	WV Cooper	11,784	22.66	
Liberal	Thomas Kellock	10,685	20.55	
Majority		17,743	34.12	
Turnout			76.91	
Conservative hold		Swing		

General election of 31 March 1966: Kensington South
Party	Candidate	Votes	%	±%
Conservative	William Roots	21,050	65.1	
Labour	J.V. Rosenhead	6,419	19.8	
Liberal	Thomas Kellock	4,871	15.1	
Majority		14,631	45.2	
Turnout		55,660	58.1	
Conservative hold		Swing		

1968 Kensington South by-election
Party	Candidate	Votes	%	±%
Conservative	Brandon Rhys-Williams	16,489	75.5	
Liberal	Thomas Kellock	2,742	12.6	
Labour	Clive Bradley	1,874	8.6	
Independent	Sinclair Eustace	675	3.1	
Independent	William Gold	59	0.3	
Majority		13,747	63.0	
Turnout			40.0	
Conservative hold		Swing		

General Election October 1974: Harwich
Party	Candidate	Votes	%	±%
Conservative	Julian Ridsdale	29,963	46.7	+1.1
Labour	JB Fryer	19,135	29.8	+3.5
Liberal	Thomas Kellock	15,048	23.5	−4.6
Majority		10,828	16.9	−0.6
Turnout		64,146	72.3	−8.4
Conservative hold		Swing	-1.2	

== See also ==
- Anti-Apartheid Movement
- Torquay (UK Parliament constituency)
- Kensington South (UK Parliament constituency)
- 1968 Kensington South by-election
- Harwich (UK Parliament constituency)
- Liberal International
