= Emrys Roberts =

Emrys Roberts may refer to:

- Emrys Roberts (Liberal politician) (1910–1990), Welsh Liberal politician and businessman
- Emrys Roberts (Plaid Cymru politician) (1931–2025), Welsh nationalist political activist
- Emrys Roberts (poet) (1929–2012), Welsh language poet and author
