= Sir Gareth Rhys Williams, 3rd Baronet =

British engineer and businessman (born 1961)

Sir (Arthur) Gareth Ludovic Emrys Rhys Williams, 3rd Baronet, CB CEng FIET FIMechE CCMI (born 9 November 1961), is a British engineer, businessman and civil servant. As of 2024, Sir Gareth is HMG Chief Commercial Officer in the Cabinet Office, where he has served since 2016.

== Early and personal life ==
Born in 1961 to Caroline née Foster, daughter of Dr Ludovic Foster, and Sir Brandon Rhys-Williams, Bt, MP, the only surviving son of Sir Rhys and Dame Juliette Rhys-Williams, Rhys Williams attended Eton College, before going up to read Engineering at Durham University, graduating BSc. Rhys Williams then pursued further studies at INSEAD, taking an MBA.

Sir Gareth married Harriet née Codner in 1996, by whom he has a daughter and two sons, including his heir to the baronetcy, Ludo (born 2001).

== Career ==
Rhys Williams worked in a number of management posts in engineering companies across Europe, rising to CEO (Chief executive officer) of Vitec Group from 2001–08, of Capital Safety for 2008–10, of Charter International for 2011–12, and finally PHS Group for 2012–14. In 2016, he was appointed as HMG Chief Commercial Officer to the Cabinet Office, replacing Chris Hall.

Rhys Williams served as a Member of the Council of the conservation charity Fauna and Flora International from 2012–20, and as one of their Vice-Presidents since 2021, after his grandfather attended the first meeting of the preceding organization the Society for the Preservation of the Wild Fauna of the Empire in 1903. Rhys Williams has been a Trustee of the Chartered Management Institute since 2022.

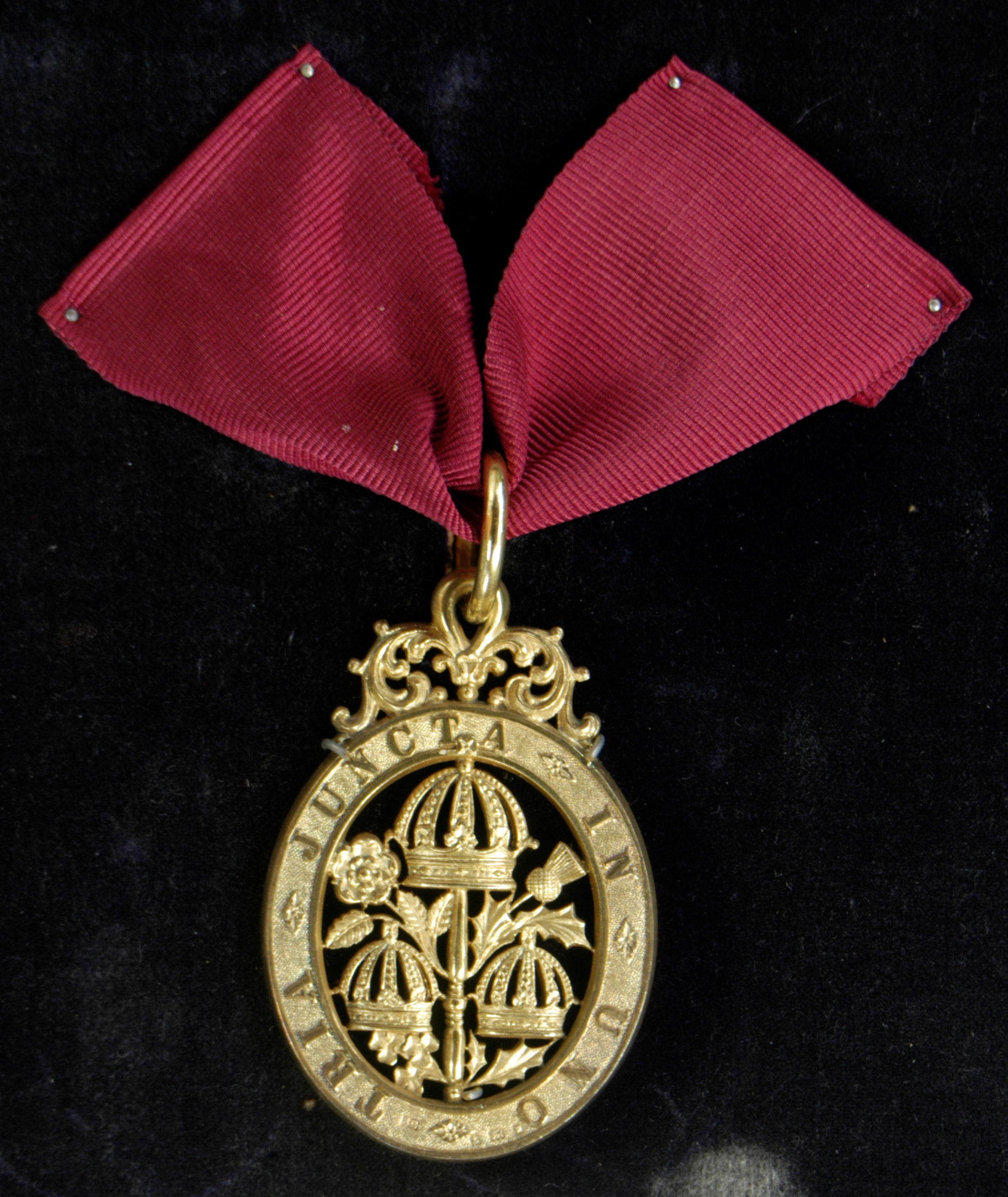
Companion of the Bath neck decoration

== Honours ==
Sir Gareth, who succeeded to the family baronetcy in 1988 upon his father's death from leukaemia, was appointed a Companion of the Order of the Bath (CB) in the 2024 New Year Honours for "public service".

== See also ==
- Rhys-Williams baronets
- Order of the Bath

Government offices
Preceded by Chris Hall	HMG Chief Commercial Officer; 2016–	Incumbent
Baronetage of the United Kingdom
Preceded by Brandon Rhys-Williams; 2nd baronet	Baronet (of Miskin); 1988–	Incumbent
