= Ebbw Vale (UK Parliament constituency) =

UK Parliament constituency (1918–1983)

- Former county constituency for the House of Commons

1918–1983
- Seats: One
- Created from: West Monmouthshire
- Replaced by: Blaenau Gwent and Merthyr Tydfil & Rhymney

Ebbw Vale was a constituency in the Parliament of the United Kingdom. It was created for the 1918 general election and returned one Member of Parliament (MP) by the first past the post system until it was abolished for the 1983 general election.

== Boundaries ==
The constituency was first contested in 1918 and was used until 1983. It comprised the north-western part of the historic county of Monmouthshire, in south-east Wales.

The seat was a county constituency, formed as a division of Monmouthshire. The areas, which comprised the seat, were Ebbw Vale, Rhymney and Tredegar. The division included three Urban District council areas, one named after each town. The boundaries were left unchanged throughout the existence of the Ebbw Vale constituency.

== Members of Parliament ==
Election	Member	Party
1918	Thomas Richards	Labour
1920 by-election	Evan Davies	Labour
1929	Aneurin Bevan	Labour
1960 by-election	Michael Foot	Labour
1983	constituency abolished. See Blaenau Gwent	

== Elections ==
=== Election in the 1970s ===
General election 1979: Ebbw Vale
Party	Candidate	Votes	%	±%
Labour	Michael Foot	20,028	69.2	−4.9
Conservative	Geoffrey Inkin	3,937	13.6	+6.1
Liberal	A T Pope	3,082	10.7	−0.4
Plaid Cymru	G R J ap Robert	1,884	6.5	−0.8
Majority		16,091	55.6	−7.4
Turnout		28,931	79.9	+3.8
Labour hold		Swing		

General election October 1974: Ebbw Vale
Party	Candidate	Votes	%	±%
Labour	Michael Foot	21,226	74.1	+4.6
Liberal	Angus Donaldson	3,167	11.1	−5.7
Conservative	Jonathan Evans	2,153	7.5	−0.3
Plaid Cymru	G R J ap Robert	2,101	7.3	+1.4
Majority		18,059	63.0	+10.3
Turnout		28,647	76.1	−3.4
Labour hold		Swing		

General election February 1974: Ebbw Vale
Party	Candidate	Votes	%	±%
Labour	Michael Foot	20,660	69.5	−2.9
Liberal	Angus Donaldson	4,996	16.8	+2.3
Conservative	Jonathan Evans	2,303	7.8	+0.7
Plaid Cymru	J D Rogers	1,767	5.9	−0.1
Majority		15,664	52.7	−5.2
Turnout		29,726	79.5	+1.1
Labour hold		Swing		

General election 1970: Ebbw Vale
Party	Candidate	Votes	%	±%
Labour	Michael Foot	21,817	72.4	−12.7
Liberal	Angus Donaldson	4,371	14.5	New
Conservative	Elgar Spencer Jenkins	2,146	7.1	−7.8
Plaid Cymru	Derek James Baskerville	1,805	6.0	New
Majority		17,446	57.9	−12.3
Turnout		30,139	78.4	−0.9
Labour hold		Swing		

=== Elections in the 1960s ===
General election 1966: Ebbw Vale
Party	Candidate	Votes	%	±%
Labour	Michael Foot	24,936	85.1	+1.5
Conservative	John Roger Lovill	4,352	14.9	−1.5
Majority		20,584	70.2	+3.0
Turnout		29,288	79.3	−0.2
Labour hold		Swing		

General election 1964: Ebbw Vale
Party	Candidate	Votes	%	±%
Labour	Michael Foot	25,220	83.6	+12.6
Conservative	Brandon Rhys-Williams	4,949	16.4	−2.6
Majority		20,271	67.2	+5.2
Turnout		30,169	79.5	−6.3
Labour hold		Swing		

1960 Ebbw Vale by-election
Party	Candidate	Votes	%	±%
Labour	Michael Foot	20,528	68.8	−12.2
Conservative	Brandon Rhys-Williams	3,799	12.7	−6.3
Liberal	Patrick Lort-Phillips	3,449	11.5	New
Plaid Cymru	Emrys Roberts	2,091	7.0	New
Majority		16,729	56.1	−6.0
Turnout		29,867	76.1	−9.7
Labour hold		Swing	-3.0	

=== Elections in the 1950s ===
General election 1959: Ebbw Vale
Party	Candidate	Votes	%	±%
Labour	Aneurin Bevan	27,326	81.0	+1.7
Conservative	Arthur Gwynne Davies	6,404	19.0	−1.7
Majority		20,922	62.0	+3.4
Turnout		33,730	85.8	+2.1
Labour hold		Swing	+1.7	

General election 1955: Ebbw Vale
Party	Candidate	Votes	%	±%
Labour	Aneurin Bevan	26,058	79.3	−1.4
Conservative	James E Bowen	6,822	20.7	+1.4
Majority		19,236	58.6	−2.8
Turnout		32,880	83.7	−3.3
Labour hold		Swing		

General election 1951: Ebbw Vale
Party	Candidate	Votes	%	±%
Labour	Aneurin Bevan	28,283	80.7	0.0
Conservative	James E Bowen	6,754	19.3	0.0
Majority		21,529	61.4	0.0
Turnout		35,037	87.0	+0.3
Labour hold		Swing		

General election 1950: Ebbw Vale
Party	Candidate	Votes	%	±%
Labour	Aneurin Bevan	28,245	80.7	+0.6
Conservative	Graeme Finlay	6,745	19.3	−0.6
Majority		21,500	61.4	+1.2
Turnout		34,990	86.7	+4.1
Labour hold		Swing		

=== Elections in the 1940s ===
General election 1945: Ebbw Vale
Party	Candidate	Votes	%	±%
Labour	Aneurin Bevan	27,209	80.1	+2.3
Conservative	Charles Stanley Parker	6,758	19.9	−2.3
Majority		20,451	60.2	+4.6
Turnout		33,967	82.6	0.0
Labour hold		Swing		

=== Election in the 1930s ===
General election 1935: Ebbw Vale
Party	Candidate	Votes	%	±%
Labour	Aneurin Bevan	25,007	77.8	N/A
Conservative	Ethel Scarborough	7,145	22.2	New
Majority		17,862	55.6	N/A
Turnout		32,152	82.6	N/A
Labour hold		Swing		

General election 1931: Ebbw Vale
Party	Candidate	Votes	%	±%
Labour	Aneurin Bevan	Unopposed	N/A	N/A

=== Election in the 1920s ===
General election 1929: Ebbw Vale
Party	Candidate	Votes	%	±%
Labour	Aneurin Bevan	20,088	60.3	N/A
Liberal	William Griffiths	8,924	26.8	New
Unionist	Mark Brace	4,287	12.9	New
Majority		11,164	33.5	N/A
Turnout		33,299	85.9	N/A
Registered electors		38,781		
Labour hold		Swing	N/A	

General election 1924: Ebbw Vale
Party	Candidate	Votes	%	±%
Labour	Evan Davies	Unopposed		
Labour hold				

General election 1923: Ebbw Vale
Party	Candidate	Votes	%	±%
Labour	Evan Davies	16,492	65.6	+0.2
Liberal	Cyrus Golyddan Davies	8,639	34.4	New
Majority		7,853	31.2	+0.4
Turnout		25,131	75.8	−2.4
Registered electors		33,171		
Labour hold		Swing		

General election 1922: Ebbw Vale
Party	Candidate	Votes	%	±%
Labour	Evan Davies	16,947	65.4	N/A
Unionist	Morgan Morgan	8,951	34.6	New
Majority		7,996	30.8	N/A
Turnout		25,898	78.2	N/A
Registered electors		33,119		
Labour hold		Swing	N/A	

1920 Ebbw Vale by-election
Party	Candidate	Votes	%	±%
Labour	Evan Davies	Unopposed		
Labour hold				

=== Election in the 1910s ===
General election 1918: Ebbw Vale
Party	Candidate	Votes	%	±%
Labour	Thomas Richards	Unopposed		
Labour win (new seat)				
