= Gordon Parry =

Gordon Parry may refer to:

- Gordon Parry (film director) (1908–1981), British film director and producer
- Gordon Parry, Baron Parry (1925–2004), Labour peer from Neyland, Wales
- Gordon Parry (musician), Grammy award winner for production and engineering
