= Dudley Fishburn =

British businessman, journalist, & politician (born 1946)

John Dudley Fishburn
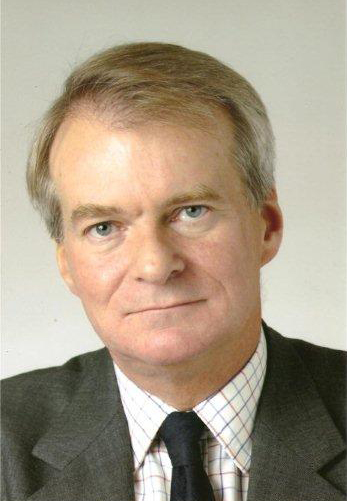

Member of Parliament for Kensington
- In office 14 July 1988 – 8 April 1997
- Preceded by: Brandon Rhys-Williams
- Succeeded by: Constituency abolished

Personal details
- Born: 8 June 1946 (age 80) New York City, New York, U.S.
- Relatives: Nick Boles (brother-in-law)
- Education: Eton College; Harvard College
- Occupation: Businessman, politician, philanthropist, journalist
- Known for: Leadership at Harvard University

John Dudley Fishburn (born 8 June 1946) is a British businessman, journalist, and politician. He was executive editor of The Economist and Member of Parliament of the United Kingdom (MP) for Kensington.

== Early life and family ==
Educated at Eton and Harvard College, from which he graduated in American history and literature and was a member of the Harvard Lampoon, he has an honorary Doctorate from the Open University and the University of Reading. He was married to Victoria Boles, who served as High Sheriff of Berkshire in 2016, a daughter of Sir Jack Boles and sister of one-time Conservative MP Nick Boles, by whom he has four children. Alice, the eldest, works as a journalist on the Financial Times; Honor was an assistant at Downing Street, having been David Cameron's diary secretary.

== Business career ==
Fishburn is the chairman of Bluecube Technology Solutions Ltd, and Mulvaney Capital Management Ltd. He is on the board of GFI Group, the European subsidiary of a Wall Street broker, BGC. He once was a Director of Altria Inc, then one of America's ten biggest companies. He was also on the board of Philip Morris International Inc, and of HSBC Bank plc, Beazley Group plc, and Saatchi and Saatchi plc.

== Not-for-profit organisations ==
Fishburn has a long connection with universities on both sides of the Atlantic. He was chairman of the Trustees of the Open University Foundation. He was the first Englishman to be elected to Harvard University's governing board, the Board of Overseers and served on the Council of Reading University and as a Trustee of the Foundation for Liver Research, which is affiliated to the University of London. He chaired the Visiting Committee of the Cambridge University Library.

For 10 years he chaired the committee for the foremost private library and research system, that of Harvard University's schools and faculties. He won the Harvard Alumni award for this work. Fishburn served of the advisory board of the Centre for the Advanced Study of India at the University of Pennsylvania.

Fishburn is currently Chairman of the Governors of Theale Green Academy, a school for 1,100 students in Theale, Berkshire, sponsored by Bradfield College.

Dudley Fishburn has worked for heritage organisations. He is currently chairman of the Heritage of London Trust and chairs the Friends of the Silchester Archaeological Dig. For 10 years he was on the Executive Committee of the National Trust and was the National Trust's Treasurer. Fishburn recently retired as Deputy Chairman of the Peabody Housing Trust. He is an advisor to the Parasol Charitable Trust.

== Politics and journalism ==
In the 1970s, Fishburn twice stood unsuccessfully for Parliament for the Isle of Wight. He was elected to the House of Commons, as the MP for Kensington, in a by-election in 1988 and re-elected in 1992. In 1997, he stepped down claiming "there were too many MPs" and has since campaigned for a reduction in the size of the House of Commons.

In Parliament, he campaigned for leasehold reform which led to the Leasehold Reform, Housing and Urban Development Act (1993). Fishburn also brought to the Statute Book a private bill to amend the Medicinal Products: Prescription by Nurses etc. Act (1992) to permit district nurses and health visitors to independently prescribe from a limited formulary, thus breaking the doctors’ monopoly. Fishburn served as Parliamentary Private Secretary to Sir Timothy Sainsbury in the Foreign and Commonwealth Office and the Department of Trade.

During his terms in Parliament, he continued as associate editor of The Economist, producing 13 annual editions of its publication The World in..., which is published in 15 languages. He has been published in The New York Times and The Times. He is now president of the Newbury Conservative Association; the member of parliament for Newbury was Laura Farris until 2024, when Lee Dillon was elected for the Liberal Democrats.

Parliament of the United Kingdom
Preceded by Sir Brandon Rhys-Williams	Member of Parliament for Kensington; 1988–1997	Constituency abolished
