= 1945 Kensington South by-election =

UK Parliamentary by-election

The 1945 Kensington South by-election was held on 20 November 1945. The by-election was held due to the elevation to hereditary peerage of the incumbent Conservative MP, Sir William Davison. It was won by the Conservative candidate Richard Law.

By-election, 20 November 1945
Party	Candidate	Votes	%	±%
Conservative	Richard Law	15,846	81.7	+11.9
Liberal	Lancelot Spicer	3,559	18.3	+7.0
Majority		12,287	68.4	+17.5
Turnout		19,405	36.8	−29.1
Conservative hold		Swing		
