= Kensington (UK Parliament constituency) =

UK Parliament constituency (1974–1997; 2010–2024)

Coordinates: 51.505°N 0.20°W

- Former borough constituency for the House of Commons
- Boundary of Kensington in Greater London
- County: Greater London
- Electorate: 64,609 (December 2019)

2010–2024
- Created from: Kensington and Chelsea; Regent's Park and Kensington North
- Replaced by: Kensington and Bayswater

1974–1997
- Created from: Kensington North; Kensington South
- Replaced by: Kensington and Chelsea; Regent's Park and Kensington North

Kensington was a constituency (Note: A borough constituency (for the purposes of election expenses and type of returning officer)) in Greater London which first existed between 1974 and 1997 and was recreated in 2010, (Note: As with all constituencies, the constituency elects one Member of Parliament (MP) by the first past the post system of election at least every five years.) until 2024. It was replaced by the Kensington and Bayswater constituency, first contested at the 2024 general election.

At the 2017 general election, Emma Dent Coad gained the seat for Labour from incumbent Conservative Victoria Borwick by the slenderest margin in England, 20 votes, the first time Kensington had been represented by a Labour MP. Dent Coad was defeated by Felicity Buchan for the Conservatives at the 2019 United Kingdom general election by a narrow margin of 150 votes.

Kensington was known as the wealthiest parliamentary constituency in the whole of the United Kingdom.

== Boundaries ==
Map of boundaries 2010–2024

The constituency formed for the 2010 election comprised the northern and central parts of the Royal Borough of Kensington and Chelsea in and around Kensington and aligned similarly with the boundary of the Royal Borough of Kensington prior to its merger with the Metropolitan Borough of Chelsea. It had the electoral wards:

- Abingdon, Brompton, Campden, Colville, Courtfield, Earls Court, Golborne, Holland, Norland, Notting Dale, Pembridge, Queen's Gate, and St Helens (Note: The remaining electoral wards in the Royal Borough involved: Cremorne, Hans Town, Redcliffe, Royal Hospital, and Stanley were lost to the cross-borough Chelsea and Fulham.)

From 1974 to 1983, the constituency comprised the electoral wards:

- Golborne, Holland, Norland, Pembridge, Queen's Gate, and St. Charles

From 1983 to 1997, the constituency comprised the electoral wards:

- Avondale, Campden, Colville, Golborne, Holland, Kelfield, Norland, Pembridge, Queen's Gate, and St. Charles

== History ==
=== First creation ===
The first incarnation of a Kensington constituency in Westminster was for the February 1974 general election, derived from the fairly safe Labour seat of Kensington North, and the overwhelmingly Conservative stronghold of Kensington South; this was abolished for the 1997 general election. The seat was mostly replaced by Regent's Park and Kensington North which until its 2010 abolition was represented by Labour MPs, being won twice during the Blair Ministry, and was partly replaced by Kensington and Chelsea which was held by Malcolm Rifkind (Conservative) until his resignation at the 2015 general election.

Summary of results (first creation)

The old seat returned Conservative MPs from 1974 up to and including its last general election in 1992. At its sole by-election in 1988 the seat was won by its smallest majority, a highly marginal 3.4% – a by-election which saw a majority turnout and a Labour splinter party candidate, for the Social Democratic Party (UK, 1988) achieve fourth place attracting 5% of the vote yet standing in the year of the formal amalgamation of the main SDP splinter group with the Liberal Party to form the Liberal Democrats who stood as the Social and Liberal Democrats and seven years after the formation of the official SDP-Liberal Alliance.

=== Second creation ===
The constituency was recreated by adopting the Fifth Periodic Review of Westminster constituencies of the Boundary Commission at the 2010 general election, combining elements of the two constituencies.

Summary of results (second creation)

The 2015 result was a narrower result than 2010, and gave the seat the 126th-most marginal majority of the Conservative Party's 331 seats by percentage of majority. The runner-up party remained the Labour Party and the Liberal Democrats' share of the vote fell by 13.9% to 5.6% of votes cast.

In the June 2017 election, three recounts occurred, the first two producing extremely close results with the latter producing a Labour majority of only 20+ votes. After the two recounts due to fatigue among the staff the counting was suspended to allow them to "rest and recuperate". The third recount gave Labour a majority of 20, the first time the constituency had become a Labour seat since its creation, and made it the Labour Party's most vulnerable seat.

== Constituency profile ==
Kensington is mostly residential — housing varies between the expensive apartments with manicured garden squares or terraces of South Kensington, that has some of the most exclusive real estate in the world located in the West End of London and, by contrast, North Kensington and Ladbroke Grove have, for the most part, dense social housing, tower blocks in output areas in inner West London with high rankings in the 2000-compiled Index of Multiple Deprivation. Kensington High Street is an upmarket shopping hub, Kensington Palace is the residence of members of the Royal Family, and Kensington Palace Gardens is the site of many embassies and a few private residences of very affluent homeowners. South Kensington also borders Hyde Park and includes the Science Museum, the Natural History Museum and the Victoria and Albert.

Earls Court, Brompton, Holland Park and Notting Hill have their own characters. Earls Court is less affluent than its neighbours; while it is undergoing rapid gentrification and includes its own areas for the super-rich, there are still old hotels and bedsits around the site of the former Earls Court Exhibition Centre, which extends into the historically marginal Hammersmith constituency. Notting Hill is an affluent, highly cosmopolitan area which hosts the Notting Hill Carnival, led by the area's Afro-Caribbean community. It fell on hard times in the twentieth century, being associated with low-rent flats and multiple-occupancy homes, but has since been gentrified.

In 1981, 11% of the population was non-White.

== Members of Parliament ==
Election	Member	Party
Feb 1974	Sir Brandon Rhys-Williams	Conservative
1988 by-election	Dudley Fishburn	Conservative
1997	constituency abolished: see Kensington and Chelsea	
2010	Sir Malcolm Rifkind	Conservative
2015	Victoria Borwick	Conservative
2017	Emma Dent Coad	Labour
2019	Felicity Buchan	Conservative

== Election results ==
=== Elections in the 2010s ===
General election 2019: Kensington
Party	Candidate	Votes	%	±%
Conservative	Felicity Buchan	16,768	38.3	−3.9
Labour	Emma Dent Coad	16,618	38.0	−4.2
Liberal Democrats	Sam Gyimah	9,312	21.3	+9.1
Green	Vivien Lichtenstein	535	1.2	−0.8
Brexit Party	Jay Aston	384	0.9	New
CPA	Roger Phillips	70	0.2	New
Touch Love Worldwide	Harriet Gore	47	0.1	New
Workers Revolutionary	Scott Dore	28	0.1	New
Majority		150	0.3	N/A
Turnout		43,762	67.7	+3.9
Registered electors		64,609		
Conservative gain from Labour		Swing	+0.2	

General election 2017: Kensington
Party	Candidate	Votes	%	±%
Labour	Emma Dent Coad	16,333	42.2	+11.1
Conservative	Victoria Borwick	16,313	42.2	−10.1
Liberal Democrats	Annabel Mullin	4,724	12.2	+6.6
Green	Jennifer Nadel	767	2.0	−3.1
Independent	James Torrance	393	1.0	New
Independent	Peter Marshall	98	0.3	New
Alliance for Green Socialism	John Lloyd	49	0.1	−0.2
Majority		20	0.0	N/A
Turnout		38,677	63.8	+6.8
Registered electors		60,588		
Labour gain from Conservative		Swing	+10.6	

Kensington was the last constituency to be declared in the 2017 general election. The result was extremely close in Kensington, which had been considered a safe Conservative seat. After three counts on 8 and 9 June, which appeared to show Labour majorities of between 36 and 50, counting was suspended due to fatigue. The result was announced later on 9 June.

General election 2015: Kensington
Party	Candidate	Votes	%	±%
Conservative	Victoria Borwick	18,199	52.3	+2.2
Labour	Rod Abouharb	10,838	31.1	+5.6
Liberal Democrats	Robin McGhee	1,962	5.6	−14.0
Green	Robina Rose	1,765	5.1	+3.0
UKIP	Jack Bovill	1,557	4.5	+2.4
CISTA	Tony Auguste	211	0.6	New
Animal Welfare	Andrew Knight	158	0.5	New
Alliance for Green Socialism	Toby Abse	115	0.3	−0.3
New Independent Centralists	Roland Courtenay	23	0.1	New
Majority		7,361	21.2	−3.4
Turnout		34,828	57.0	+3.7
Registered electors		61,133		
Conservative hold		Swing	−1.7	

General election 2010: Kensington
Party	Candidate	Votes	%	±%
Conservative	Malcolm Rifkind	17,595	50.1	+6.2
Labour	Sam Gurney	8,979	25.5	−4.1
Liberal Democrats	Robin Meltzer	6,872	19.6	−0.6
UKIP	Stephen James Cleeve	754	2.1	+1.0
Green	Melan Ebrahimi-Fardouée	753	2.1	−2.4
Alliance for Green Socialism	Eddie Adams	197	0.6	+0.2
Majority		8,616	24.6	
Turnout		35,150	53.3	
Registered electors		65,975		
Conservative win (new seat)				

=== Elections in the 1990s ===
General election 1992: Kensington
Party	Candidate	Votes	%	±%
Conservative	Dudley Fishburn	15,540	50.3	+2.8
Labour	Patricia Holmes	11,992	38.8	+5.5
Liberal Democrats	Christopher Shirley	2,770	9.0	−8.2
Green	Ajay Burlingham-Johnson	415	1.3	−0.4
Natural Law	Anthony W. Hardy	90	0.3	New
Anti-Federalist League	Anne Bulloch	71	0.2	New
Majority		3,548	11.5	−2.7
Turnout		30,878	73.3	+8.6
Registered electors		42,129		
Conservative hold		Swing	−1.4	

=== Elections in the 1980s ===
1988 Kensington by-election
Party	Candidate	Votes	%	±%
Conservative	Dudley Fishburn	9,829	41.6	−5.9
Labour	Patricia Holmes	9,014	38.1	+4.8
SLD	William Goodhart	2,546	10.8	−6.4
SDP	John Martin	1,190	5.04	New
Green	Phylip Hobson	572	2.42	+0.7
Rainbow Alliance – Payne & Pleasure	Cynthia Payne	193	0.82	New
Monster Raving Loony	Screaming Lord Sutch	61	0.26	New
London Class War Candidate	John Duignan	60	0.25	New
Anti Left-Wing Fascist	Brian Goodier	31	0.13	New
Free Trade Liberal – Europe Out!	Thomas McDermott	31	0.13	New
Fair Wealth & Health	Roy Edey	30	0.13	New
Leveller Party	William Scola	27	0.11	New
Anti-Yuppie	John Crowley	24	0.10	New
Peace – Stop ITN Manipulation	John Connell	20	0.08	New
Independent Janata Party	Kailash Trivedi	5	0.02	New
Majority		815	3.45	−10.8
Turnout		23,633	51.6	−13.1
Registered electors		45,830		
Conservative hold		Swing	-5.40	

General election 1987: Kensington
Party	Candidate	Votes	%	±%
Conservative	Brandon Rhys-Williams	14,818	47.5	+1.5
Labour	Benjamin Bousquet	10,371	33.3	+3.8
SDP	William Goodhart	5,379	17.2	−4.9
Green	Roger Shorter	528	1.7	−0.4
Humanist	Lana Carrick	65	0.2	New
Public Independent Plaintiff Party	Muriel Hughes	30	0.1	New
Majority		4,447	14.2	−2.3
Turnout		31,191	64.7	+2.4
Registered electors		48,212		
Conservative hold		Swing		

General election 1983: Kensington
Party	Candidate	Votes	%	±%
Conservative	Brandon Rhys-Williams	14,274	46.0	−5.3
Labour	Benjamin Bousquet	9,173	29.5	−5.7
SDP	William Goodhart	6,873	22.1	New
Ecology	Jonathon Porritt	649	2.1	0.0
Independent	T.F. Knight	86	0.3	New
Majority		5,101	16.5	+0.4
Turnout		31,055	62.3	−2.3
Registered electors		49,584		
Conservative hold		Swing		

=== Elections in the 1970s ===
General election 1979: Kensington
Party	Candidate	Votes	%	±%
Conservative	Brandon Rhys-Williams	17,361	51.3	+6.1
Labour	Patricia Holmes	11,898	35.2	−4.4
Liberal	Bobbie Vincent-Emery	3,537	10.5	−4.7
Ecology	Nicholas Albery	698	2.1	New
National Front	Christopher Hopewell	356	1.1	New
Majority		5,463	16.1	+10.5
Turnout		33,850	64.6	+8.2
Registered electors		52,396		
Conservative hold		Swing		

General election October 1974: Kensington
Party	Candidate	Votes	%	±%
Conservative	Brandon Rhys-Williams	15,562	45.2	−0.9
Labour	John Tilley	13,645	39.6	+6.4
Liberal	R. Cohen	5,236	15.2	−5.5
Majority		1,917	5.6	−7.3
Turnout		34,443	56.4	−9.4
Registered electors		61,105		
Conservative hold		Swing		

General election February 1974: Kensington
Party	Candidate	Votes	%	±%
Conservative	Brandon Rhys-Williams	18,425	46.1	
Labour	John Tilley	13,293	33.2	
Liberal	Robert LeFever	8,270	20.7	
Majority		5,132	12.9	
Turnout		39,988	65.8	
Registered electors		60,818		
Conservative win (new seat)				

== See also ==
- List of parliamentary constituencies in London
