= Rhys-Williams baronets =

Baronetcy in the Baronetage of the United Kingdom

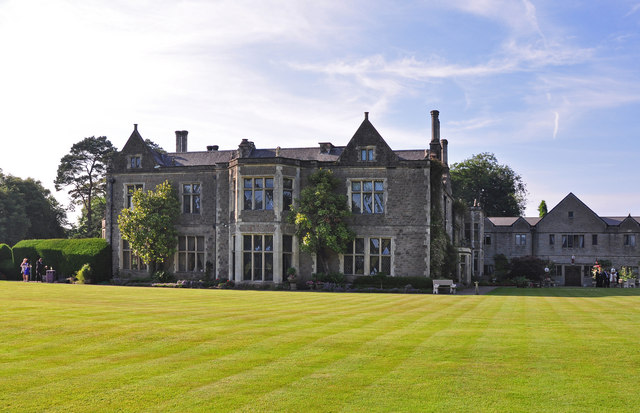
Miskin Manor, the former seat of the Rhys Williams family

The Williams, later Rhys Williams Baronetcy, of Miskin in the Parish of Llantrisant in the County of Glamorgan, is a title in the Baronetage of the United Kingdom. It was created in 1918 for Rhys Williams, member of parliament for Banbury from 1918 to 1922. He assumed in 1938 by deed poll the additional surname of Rhys. The second baronet was a Conservative politician. As of 2014 the title is held by the latter's son, the third baronet, who succeeded in 1988.

The family seat was Miskin Manor, near Rhondda Cynon Taf, Glamorgan.

== Williams, later Rhys Williams baronets, of Miskin (1918) ==
- Sir Rhys Rhys Williams, 1st Baronet (1865–1955)
- Sir Brandon Meredith Rhys Williams, 2nd Baronet (1927–1988)
- Sir (Arthur) Gareth Ludovic Emrys Rhys Williams, 3rd Baronet (born 1961)

The heir apparent is the present holder's eldest son Ludo Dhaulagiri Rhys Williams (born 12 October 2001).
