= 1895 Kensington South by-election =

UK Parliamentary by-election

The 1895 Kensington South by-election was held on 28 November 1895. The by-election was held due to the elevation to hereditary peerage of the incumbent Conservative MP and journalist, Sir Algernon Borthwick, who had been elected unopposed earlier in the year in the 1895 United Kingdom general election. It was won by the 24 year old Conservative candidate Henry Percy, styled with the courtesy title Lord Warkworth as the eldest son of the then Earl Percy (in turn the eldest son of the Duke of Northumberland).

By-election, 28 November 1895
Party	Candidate	Votes	%	±%
Conservative	Henry Percy, Lord Warkworth	Unopposed	N/A	N/A
Conservative hold				
