= Kensington South =

Parliamentary constituency in the United Kingdom, 1885–1974

- Former borough constituency for the House of Commons

1885–February 1974
- Seats: one
- Created from: Chelsea
- Replaced by: Kensington

Kensington South was a parliamentary constituency centred on the Kensington district of west London. It returned one Member of Parliament (MP) to the House of Commons of the Parliament of the United Kingdom.

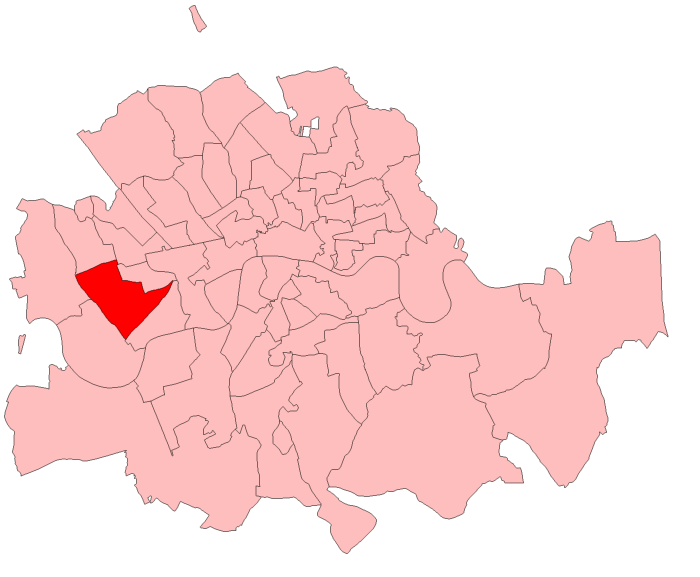
Kensington South in the Metropolitan area 1885-1918

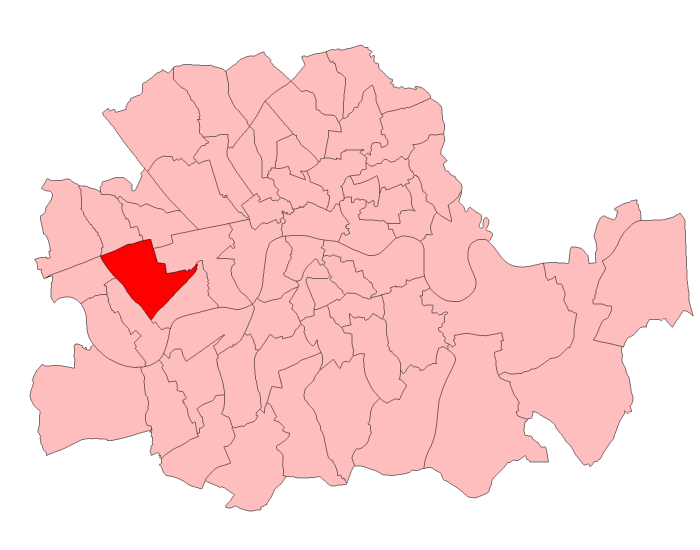
Kensington South in the Parliamentary County of London 1918-50

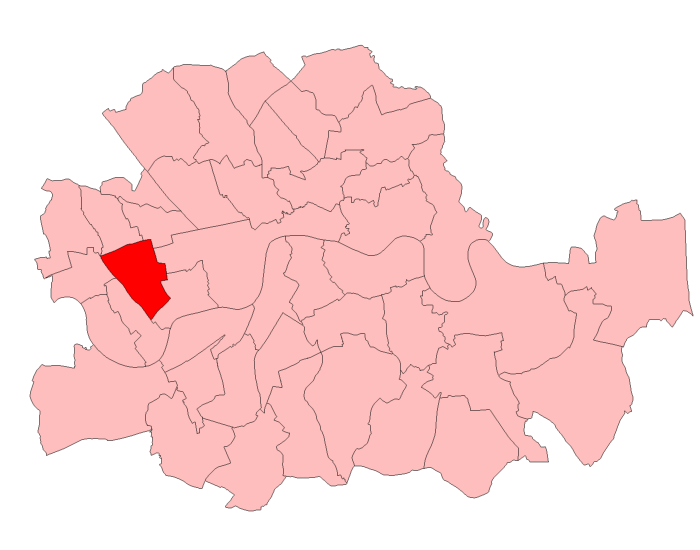
Kensington South in the Parliamentary County of London 1950-74

Kensington Metropolitan Borough wards in 1916

The constituency was created for the 1885 general election, and abolished for the February 1974 general election. In every postwar election until its abolition, it was the safest Conservative seat (excluding Northern Irish constituencies) in the country.

== Members of Parliament ==
Election	Member	Party
1885	Sir Algernon Borthwick	Conservative
1895 by-election	Lord Warkworth (known as Earl Percy from 1899)	Conservative
1910	Lord Claud Hamilton	Conservative
1918	Sir William Davison	Conservative
1945 by-election	Richard Law	Conservative
1950	Sir Patrick Spens	Conservative
1959	William Roots	Conservative
1968 by-election	Sir Brandon Rhys-Williams	Conservative
Feb 1974	constituency abolished	

== Boundaries ==
Prior to 1885, the area was originally part of the Chelsea constituency. Following the Redistribution of Seats Act 1885, the new Kensington South seat was a single-member constituency consisting of all of the parliamentary borough of Kensington south of the Uxbridge Road.

Following boundary changes under the Representation of the People Act 1918, the constituency was defined as consisting of the Royal Borough of Kensington wards of Brompton, Earl's Court, Holland, Queen's Gate, and Redcliffe.

In the 1950 redistribution, Brompton ward was transferred to the Chelsea constituency. The constituency was thus now defined as consisting of the Royal Borough of Kensington wards of Earl's Court, Holland, Queen's Gate, and Redcliffe. It then remained unchanged until its abolition in 1974.

In 1965, under major local government boundary changes, the London County Council area was absorbed by the new Greater London Council, and the constituency was included in a new London Borough of Kensington and Chelsea. This did not affect parliamentary boundaries for another nine years, however.

In the 1974 redistribution, this constituency disappeared. Earl's Court and Redcliffe wards became part of the redrawn Chelsea constituency, while Holland and Queen's Gate wards became part of the new Kensington constituency.

== Election results ==
=== Elections in the 1880s ===
General election 1885: Kensington, South
Party	Candidate	Votes	%	±%
Conservative	Algernon Borthwick	4,602	68.3	
Liberal	Montagu Hughes Cookson	2,138	31.7	
Majority		2,464	36.6	
Turnout		6,740	76.1	
Registered electors		8,859		
Conservative win (new seat)				

General election 1886: Kensington, South
Party	Candidate	Votes	%	±%
Conservative	Algernon Borthwick	4,156	80.3	+12.0
Liberal	Henry Fearnside Speed	1,022	19.7	−12.0
Majority		3,134	60.6	+24.0
Turnout		5,178	58.4	−17.7
Registered electors		8,859		
Conservative hold		Swing	+12.0	

=== Elections in the 1890s ===
General election 1892: Kensington, South
Party	Candidate	Votes	%	±%
Conservative	Algernon Borthwick	Unopposed		
Conservative hold				

General election 1895: Kensington, South
Party	Candidate	Votes	%	±%
Conservative	Algernon Borthwick	Unopposed		
Conservative hold				

By-election: 28 November 1895
Party	Candidate	Votes	%	±%
Conservative	Henry Percy	Unopposed		
Conservative hold				

=== Elections in the 1900s ===
General election 1900: Kensington, South
Party	Candidate	Votes	%	±%
Conservative	Henry Percy	Unopposed		
Conservative hold				

General election 1906: Kensington, South
Party	Candidate	Votes	%	±%
Conservative	Henry Percy	4,835	74.9	N/A
Liberal	Edward O'Malley	1,624	25.1	New
Majority		3,211	49.8	N/A
Turnout		6,459	70.0	N/A
Registered electors		9,223		
Conservative hold		Swing	N/A	

=== Elections in the 1910s ===
General election January 1910: Kensington, South
Party	Candidate	Votes	%	±%
Conservative	Claud Hamilton	5,771	81.6	+6.7
Liberal	George Stanford MacIlwaine	1,301	18.4	−6.7
Majority		4,470	63.2	+13.4
Turnout		7,072	77.2	+7.2
Conservative hold		Swing		

General election December 1910: Kensington, South
Party	Candidate	Votes	%	±%
Conservative	Claud Hamilton	5,093	83.1	+1.5
Liberal	George Rodhouse Reid	1,033	16.9	−1.5
Majority		4,060	66.2	+3.0
Turnout		6,126	66.9	−10.3
Conservative hold		Swing		

General election 1918: Kensington South
Party		Candidate	Votes	%	±%
C	Unionist	William Davison	10,693	66.8	−16.3
	National	Ernest Makins	5,306	33.2	N/A
Majority			5,387	33.6	−32.6
Turnout			15,999	51.8	−15.1
Registered electors			30,888		
	Unionist hold		Swing	−16.3	
C indicates candidate endorsed by the coalition government.

=== Elections in the 1920s ===
General election 1922: Kensington South
Party	Candidate	Votes	%	±%
Unionist	William Davison	15,760	76.0	+9.2
Independent	* Ferdinand Cavendish-Bentinck	4,964	24.0	New
Majority		10,796	52.0	+18.4
Turnout		20,724	58.1	+6.3
Registered electors		35,684		
Unionist hold		Swing	+9.2	

*Cavendish-Bentinck was incorrectly labelled by the media as a National Liberal but corrected this label as 'anti-Conservative'.

General election 1923: Kensington South
Party	Candidate	Votes	%	±%
Unionist	William Davison	Unopposed		
Unionist hold				

General election 1924: Kensington South
Party	Candidate	Votes	%	±%
Unionist	William Davison	Unopposed		
Unionist hold				

General election 1929: Kensington South
Party	Candidate	Votes	%	±%
Unionist	William Davison	28,049	66.9	N/A
Liberal	Hugh Seely	7,570	18.0	New
Ind. Unionist	Rayner Goddard	6,354	15.1	New
Majority		20,479	48.9	N/A
Turnout		41,973	59.5	N/A
Registered electors		70,593		
Unionist hold		Swing	N/A	

=== Elections in the 1930s ===
General election 1931: Kensington South
Party	Candidate	Votes	%	±%
Conservative	William Davison	Unopposed	N/A	N/A
Conservative hold		Swing	N/A	

General election 1935: Kensington South
Party	Candidate	Votes	%	±%
Conservative	William Davison	38,297	88.9	N/A
Labour	Charles Henry Hartwell	4,779	11.1	New
Majority		33,518	77.8	N/A
Turnout		43,076	62.0	N/A
Conservative hold		Swing	N/A	

=== Elections in the 1940s ===
General election 1945: Kensington South
Party	Candidate	Votes	%	±%
Conservative	William Davison	22,166	69.8	−19.1
Labour	Patricia Strauss	6,014	18.9	+8.8
Liberal	Francis N Beaufort-Palmer	3,586	11.3	New
Majority		16,152	50.9	−26.9
Turnout		31,766	67.9	+5.9
Conservative hold		Swing		

By-election, 20 November 1945
Party	Candidate	Votes	%	±%
Conservative	Richard Law	15,846	81.7	+11.9
Liberal	Lancelot Spicer	3,559	18.3	+7.0
Majority		12,287	68.4	+17.5
Turnout		19,405	36.8	−29.1
Conservative hold		Swing		

=== Elections in the 1950s ===
General election 1950: Kensington South
Party	Candidate	Votes	%	±%
Conservative	Patrick Spens	32,870	73.1	+3.3
Labour	Marcel Philip Picard	8,002	17.8	−1.1
Liberal	John Frankenburg	4,079	9.1	−2.2
Majority		24,868	55.3	+4.4
Turnout		44,951	71.0	+3.1
Conservative hold		Swing		

General election 1951: Kensington South
Party	Candidate	Votes	%	±%
Conservative	Patrick Spens	34,592	79.5	+6.4
Labour	Michael Clynes Parker	8,894	20.5	+2.7
Majority		25,698	59.0	+5.7
Turnout		43,486	68.6	−2.4
Conservative hold		Swing		

General election 1955: Kensington South
Party	Candidate	Votes	%	±%
Conservative	Patrick Spens	32,051	82.5	+3.0
Labour	Marjorie Macrae Crane	6,804	17.5	−3.0
Majority		25,247	65.0	+6.0
Turnout		38,855	62.0	−6.6
Conservative hold		Swing		

General election 1959: Kensington South
Party	Candidate	Votes	%	±%
Conservative	William Roots	26,606	74.3	−8.2
Liberal	Gurth Hoyer-Millar	4,666	13.0	New
Labour	Ivor Richard	4,525	12.6	−4.9
Majority		21,940	61.3	−3.7
Turnout		35,797	61.7	−0.3
Conservative hold		Swing		

=== Elections in the 1960s ===
General election 1964: Kensington South
Party	Candidate	Votes	%	±%
Conservative	William Roots	21,668	68.0	−3.3
Labour	Barrington J Stead	5,300	16.6	+4.0
Liberal	Anthony A W Dix	4,916	15.4	+2.4
Majority		16,368	51.3	−10.0
Turnout		31,884	56.8	−3.9
Conservative hold		Swing		

General election 1966: Kensington South
Party	Candidate	Votes	%	±%
Conservative	William Roots	21,050	65.1	−2.9
Labour	Jonathan V Rosenhead	6,419	19.8	+3.2
Liberal	Thomas Kellock	4,871	15.1	−0.3
Majority		14,631	45.3	−6.0
Turnout		32,340	58.1	+1.3
Conservative hold		Swing		

By-election of 14 March 1968
Party	Candidate	Votes	%	±%
Conservative	Brandon Rhys-Williams	16,489	75.5	+10.4
Liberal	Thomas Kellock	2,742	12.6	−2.5
Labour	Clive Bradley (executive)	1,874	8.6	−11.2
Independent	Sinclair Eustace	675	3.1	New
Independent	William Gold	59	0.3	New
Majority		13,747	62.9	+17.6
Turnout		21,839	40.0	−18.1
Conservative hold		Swing		

=== Elections in the 1970s ===
General election 1970: Kensington South
Party	Candidate	Votes	%	±%
Conservative	Brandon Rhys-Williams	21,591	75.7	+10.6
Labour	Faith M Bridges	6,928	24.3	+4.5
Majority		14,663	51.4	+6.1
Turnout		28,519	49.9	−8.2
Conservative hold		Swing		
