= 1968 Kensington South by-election =

UK parliamentary by-election

The 1968 Kensington South by-election by-election was held in the Kensington South constituency of the House of Commons of the United Kingdom on 14 March 1968. The election was to fill a vacancy in the seat formerly held by Conservative MP William Roots, who resigned from Parliament in 1968 due to ill health.

The seat was considered a safe seat for the Conservatives ('as safe and solid as the red-brick Victorian blocks of flats', wrote the Times); at the 1966 general election Roots was elected with 65.1 percent of the vote and a majority of 14,631. Turnout was expected to be low as the constituency had a large transient population living in bedsits and flats.

The Conservative Sir Brandon Rhys-Williams, a management consultant, won the seat with 75.5 percent of the vote and a slightly reduced majority (13,747) on a much reduced turnout. The Liberal candidate Thomas Kellock, a QC who had fought the seat at the previous general election, came in a distant second, with Labour candidate Clive Bradley, a barrister and journalist, forced into third place and losing his deposit. There were two independent candidates who received the fewest votes: Sinclair Eustace, 37, a teacher of phonetics and a campaigner against aircraft noise, described by The Times as 'perhaps the most civilized and likeable' of all the candidates but with a platform very close to that of the Liberal Party; and William Gold, 45, an engineer and 'a Buddhist, anti-vivisectionist, periodic vegetarian and author of at least six unpublished novels' who had only just returned to the UK after living in Australia.

== Result ==
By-Election 14 March 1968: Kensington South
Party	Candidate	Votes	%	±%
Conservative	Brandon Rhys-Williams	16,489	75.5	+10.4
Liberal	Thomas Kellock	2,742	12.6	−2.5
Labour	Clive Bradley	1,874	8.6	−11.2
Independent	Sinclair Eustace	675	3.1	New
Independent	William Gold	59	0.3	New
Majority		13,747	62.9	+17.8
Turnout		21,839	40.0	−18.1
Conservative hold		Swing		
