= 1988 Kensington by-election =

Election in the UK

- 14 July 1988

Constituency of Kensington
- Turnout: 51.6% (▼13.1%)
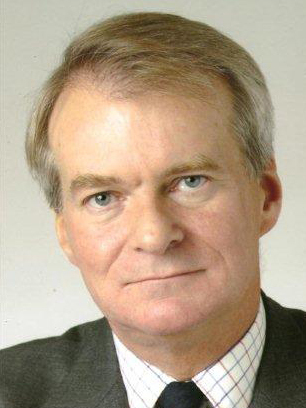
	First party	Second party
		Lab
Candidate	Dudley Fishburn	Patricia Holmes
Party	Conservative	Labour
Popular vote	9,829	9,014
Percentage	41.59%	38.14%
Swing	▼5.9%	▲4.9%
	Third party	Fourth party
	SLD	SDP
Candidate	William Goodhart	John Martin
Party	SLD	SDP
Popular vote	2,546	1,190
Percentage	10.77%	5.04%
Swing	▼6.5%	N/A
MP before election
Brandon Rhys-Williams
Conservative
Subsequent MP
Dudley Fishburn
Conservative

The 1988 Kensington by-election, in Kensington, on 14 July 1988 was held after the death of Conservative Member of Parliament (MP) Brandon Rhys-Williams. Normally a relatively safe Conservative seat, it was narrowly won by Dudley Fishburn, who would retain the seat in 1992.

It was the first by-election of that parliament, which had begun after the general election of June 1987, and would last until the next election in April 1992.

== Candidates ==
- John Connell was a peace advocate who opposed what he saw as manipulation of the news by ITN.
- John Crowley described himself as an 'Anti Yuppie Revolutionary Crowleyist, Vegetarian Visionary'.
- John Duignan was a supporter of the Class War organisation.
- Roy Edey called for equal redistribution of wealth and a policy of social housing construction.
- Dudley Fishburn was a former editor of The Economist.
- William Goodhart was a leading human rights lawyer who has since taken a seat in the House of Lords.
- Brian Goodier described himself as an 'Anti-Left Wing Fascist'.
- Phylip Hobson was the Green Party candidate.
- Ann Holmes was again a candidate for this seat in the 1992 general election. and subsequently became a councillor in the City of London.
- John Martin was a candidate for the dissident wing of the SDP that had rejected membership of the Social and Liberal Democrats.
- Thomas McDermott was the founder of the Free Trade Liberal Party and campaigned on a platform of the UK leaving the European Community.
- Cynthia Payne, who had been convicted of controlling a brothel, ran under the 'Rainbow Alliance Payne and Pleasure Party' banner.
- William Scola represented his own 'Leveller Party'.
- Screaming Lord Sutch was the leader and founder of the Official Monster Raving Loony Party.
- Kailash Trivedi ran as candidate for the 'Janata Party' (Peoples Party in Hindi and the name of a former governing party in India), his own creation.

== Result ==
1988 Kensington by-election
Party	Candidate	Votes	%	±%
Conservative	Dudley Fishburn	9,829	41.59	−5.9
Labour	Patricia Holmes	9,014	38.14	+4.9
SLD	William Goodhart	2,546	10.77	−6.5
SDP	John Martin	1,190	5.04	N/A
Green	Phylip Hobson	572	2.42	+0.7
Rainbow Alliance – Payne & Pleasure	Cynthia Payne	193	0.82	N/A
Monster Raving Loony	Screaming Lord Sutch	61	0.26	N/A
London Class War Candidate	John Duignan	60	0.25	N/A
Anti Left-Wing Fascist	Brian Goodier	31	0.13	N/A
Free Trade Liberal – Europe Out!	Thomas McDermott	31	0.13	N/A
Fair Wealth & Health	Roy Edey	30	0.13	N/A
Leveller Party	William Scola	27	0.11	N/A
Anti-Yuppie	John Crowley	24	0.10	N/A
Peace – Stop ITN Manipulation	John Connell	20	0.08	N/A
Independent Janata Party	Kailash Trivedi	5	0.02	N/A
Majority		815	3.55	−10.69
Turnout		23,633	51.6	−13.1
Registered electors		45,830		
Conservative hold		Swing	-5.40	

== Previous result ==
General election 1987: Kensington
Party	Candidate	Votes	%	±%
Conservative	Brandon Rhys-Williams	14,818	47.5	+1.5
Labour	Benjamin Bousquet	10,371	33.3	+3.8
SDP	William Goodhart	5,379	17.2	−4.9
Green	Roger Shorter	528	1.7	−0.4
Humanist	Lana Carrick	65	0.2	N/A
Public Independent Plaintiff Party	Muriel Hughes	30	0.1	N/A
Majority		4,447	14.26	−2.14
Turnout		31,191	64.7	+2.4
Registered electors		48,212		
Conservative hold		Swing		
