= Henry Percy, Earl Percy =

British politician (1871–1909)

Earl Percy
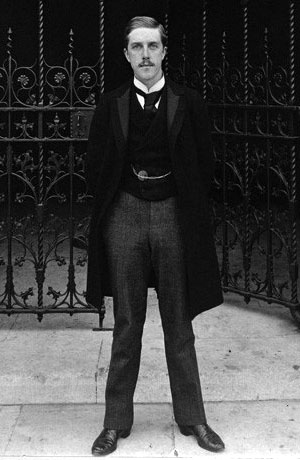
- Earl Percy, photographed by Sir John Benjamin Stone

Under-Secretary of State for India
- In office 18 August 1902 – 9 October 1903
- Monarch: Edward VII
- Prime Minister: Arthur Balfour
- Preceded by: The Earl of Hardwicke
- Succeeded by: Vacant

Under-Secretary of State for Foreign Affairs
- In office 9 October 1903 – 4 December 1905
- Monarch: Edward VII
- Prime Minister: Arthur Balfour
- Preceded by: Viscount Cranborne
- Succeeded by: Lord Edmond Fitzmaurice

Personal details
- Born: 21 January 1871 Mayfair, London
- Died: 30 December 1909 (aged 38) Paris, France
- Party: Conservative
- Parent(s): Henry Percy, 7th Duke of Northumberland; Lady Edith Campbell
- Education: Christ Church, Oxford

Henry Algernon George Percy, Earl Percy (21 January 1871 – 30 December 1909), sometimes styled as Lord Percy or, until 1899, Lord Warkworth, was a British Conservative politician from the Percy family. He held political office under Arthur Balfour as Under-Secretary of State for India and Under-Secretary of State for Foreign Affairs before his early death in 1909.

== Background ==
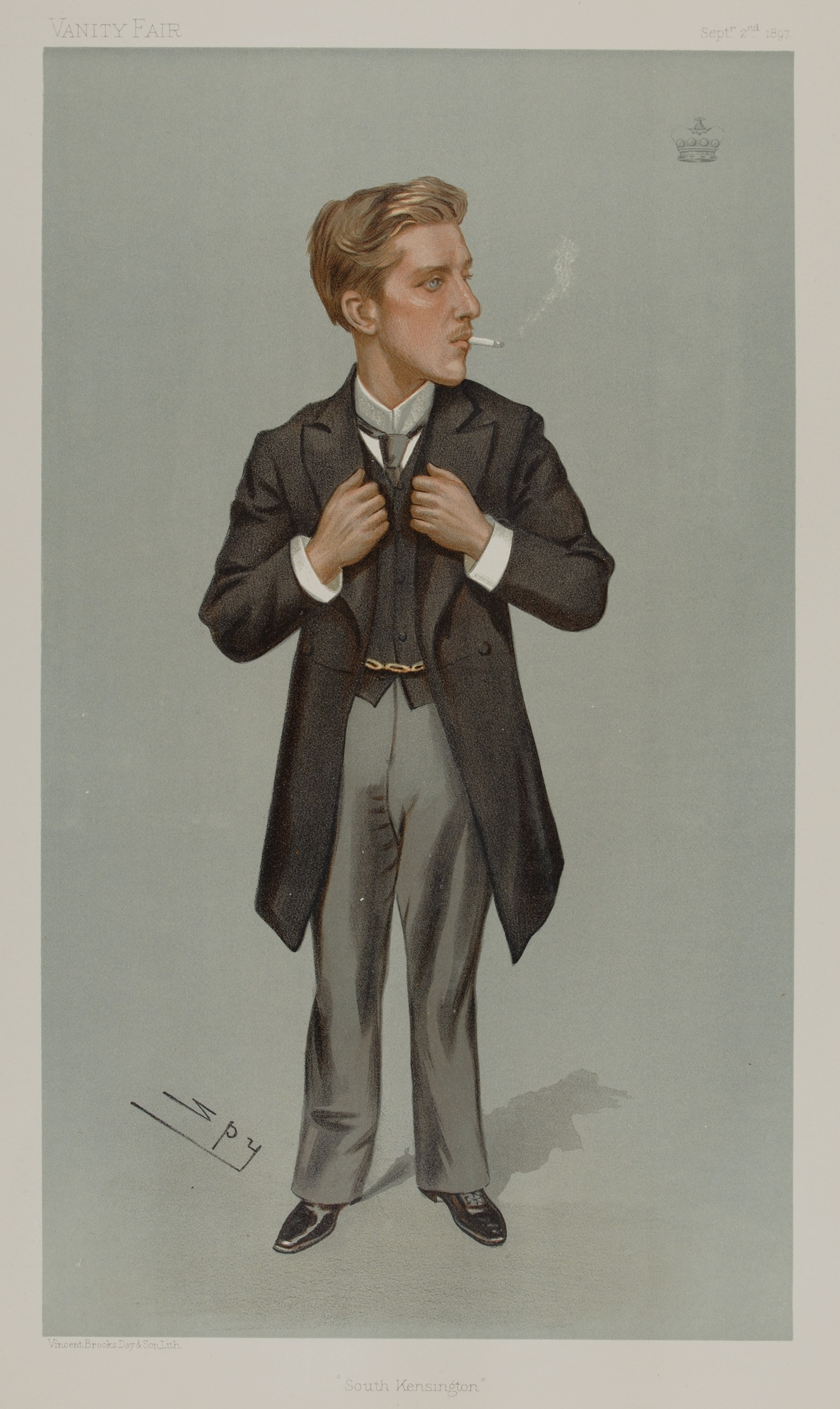
Earl Percy as caricatured by Spy (Leslie Ward) in Vanity Fair, September 1897

Percy was born at 25 Grosvenor Square in Mayfair, the eldest son of Henry Percy, 7th Duke of Northumberland, and his wife Lady Edith, daughter of George Campbell, 8th Duke of Argyll. Alan Percy, 8th Duke of Northumberland, and Eustace Percy, 1st Baron Percy of Newcastle, were his younger brothers.

He was educated at Eton College and Christ Church, Oxford.

== Political career ==
Percy was returned to Parliament for Kensington South in a November 1895 by-election, replacing the ennobled Sir Algernon Borthwick. In August 1902 he was appointed Under-Secretary of State for India in the Conservative administration of Arthur Balfour, a post he held until 1903, and was then Under-Secretary of State for Foreign Affairs under Balfour from 1903 to 1905.

== Personal life ==
Lord Percy died in Paris in December 1909, aged 38, from pleurisy caused by pneumonia. The Paris correspondent for The Times reported:

Lord Percy, who had arrived in Paris shortly before Christmas, contracted a chill a few days ago, which ultimately developed into an attack of pneumonia. He had rallied to some extent yesterday afternoon, and it was hoped that a change for the better had set in, but early this morning a fresh crisis took place, to which he succumbed.

— The Times, 31 December 1909

His brother Lord William Percy and sister Lady Victoria Percy, who had traveled to Paris when they learned of their brother's condition, were with him when he died.

However, as the wealthy Lord Percy had been staying at the cheap Hotel du Buffet-Nord at the Gare du Nord, under the name Mr. Percy, his sudden death resulted in a conspiracy theory that he had been mortally wounded in a duel. A decade later, unfounded rumours circulated that he had been murdered on the orders of Winston Churchill, who was unpopular at the time because of his role as mastermind of the disastrous Gallipoli campaign during the First World War, when he served as First Lord of the Admiralty.

Rumours alleged that Percy had been the lover of Clementine Hozier, whom Churchill married in 1908. Churchill's mild-mannered brother Jack was whispered to have been the unlikely perpetrator of this act, because Winston was "too cowardly" to do the deed himself.

Percy was unmarried. He died intestate and with property worth more than £210,000 (equivalent to £21,387,000 in 2025), which was left to the administration of his father. His brother Alan became heir to their father in the dukedom.

== See also ==
- Duke of Northumberland

Parliament of the United Kingdom
Preceded by Sir Algernon Borthwick, Bt	Member of Parliament for Kensington South; 1895 – 1909	Succeeded by Lord Claud Hamilton
Political offices
Preceded by The Earl of Hardwicke	Under-Secretary of State for India; 1902–1903	Vacant
Preceded by Viscount Cranborne	Under-Secretary of State for Foreign Affairs; 1903–1905	Succeeded by Lord Edmond Fitzmaurice
