= Government Chief Commercial Officer =

The Government Chief Commercial Officer, formerly the Chief Procurement Officer, is a director-general-graded job in the British Civil Service, working in the Cabinet Office. They lead across government on procuring goods and services, and planning commercial needs. They head the Government Commercial Function, one of the official vertical groupings of professionals working with the service. The GCCO reports directly to the Permanent Secretary of the Cabinet Office in their role as Chief Executive of the Civil Service.

== List of Government Chief Commercial Officers ==
- April 2012–November 2015: Bill Crothers
- December 2015–March 2016: (interim) Chris Hall
- March 2016–July 2024: Sir Gareth Rhys Williams
