= Lancelot Spicer =

British Liberal Party politician

Lancelot Dykes Spicer DSO, MC and Bar, (22 March 1893 – 6 December 1979), was a British Liberal Party politician.

== Background ==
He was the youngest son of Rt Hon. Sir Albert Spicer, the Liberal Party politician. He was educated at Rugby School and Trinity College, Cambridge. He married in 1920, Iris Cox. They had one son who was killed in action on 31 May 1944. Iris obtained a divorce in 1935. Lancelot's second marriage, in 1951, was to Dorothy Beverley Gwyther.

== War service ==
In the First World War he was granted temporary commission in the Army in September 1914. He was made T/Captain in July 1916 and Brigade-Major in April 1918. He served with the King's Own Yorkshire Light Infantry, was awarded the Military Cross in October 1917, bar to Military Cross in May 1918 and was made a Companion of the Distinguished Service Order in September 1918.

== Professional career ==
He was a director of the family paper-manufacturing business Spicers Ltd, serving as chairman from 1950 to 1959. He served as president of the Stationers' Association of Britain and Ireland.

== Political career ==
In November 1941 he was a founder of the Liberal Action Group, a pressure group inside of the Liberal Party that lobbied for the party to withdraw from the wartime electoral truce. In 1943 he was selected as Liberal prospective parliamentary candidate for the Walthamstow West Division of Essex and at the 1945 General Election finished second.

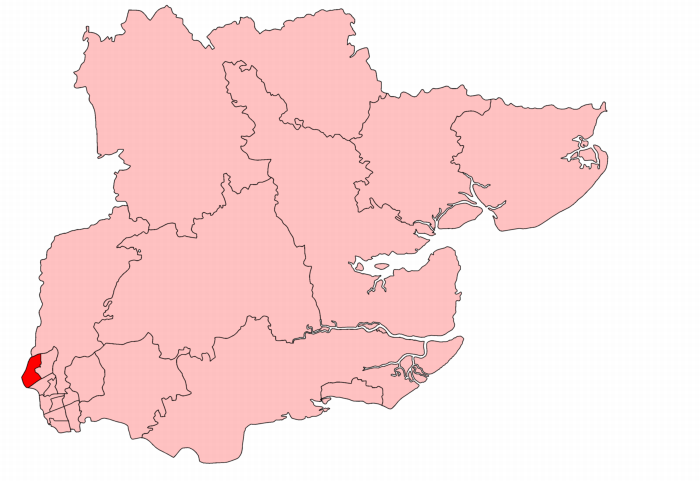
Walthamstow West in Essex for 1945

General Election 1945: Walthamstow West Electorate 38,269
Party	Candidate	Votes	%	±%
Labour	Valentine la Touche McEntee	17,460	65.22	
Liberal	Lancelot Dykes Spicer	4,760	17.78	
Conservative	Leslie Charles Curran	4,550	17.00	
Majority		12,700	47.44	
Turnout			70.14	
Labour hold		Swing		

He was Liberal candidate for the Kensington South Division of London at the 1945 Kensington South by-election where he finished second.

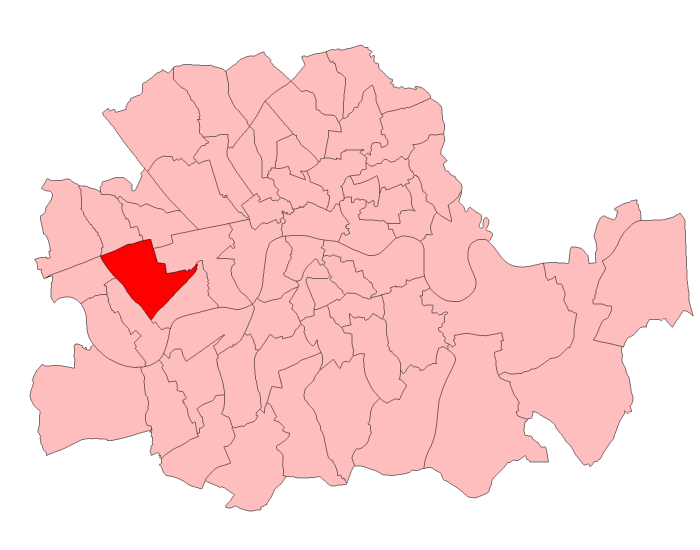
Kensington South in London in 1944

By-election, 20 November 1945 Electorate 52,750
Party	Candidate	Votes	%	±%
Conservative	Rt Hon. Richard Kidston Law	15,846	81.7	+11.9
Liberal	Lancelot Dykes Spicer	3,559	18.3	+7.0
Majority		12,287	68.4	
Turnout		52,750	36.8	
Conservative hold		Swing		

He did not stand for parliament again.
