= 1960 Ebbw Vale by-election =

House of Commons by-election

- 17 November 1960

Constituency of Ebbw Vale
- Turnout: 76.1%
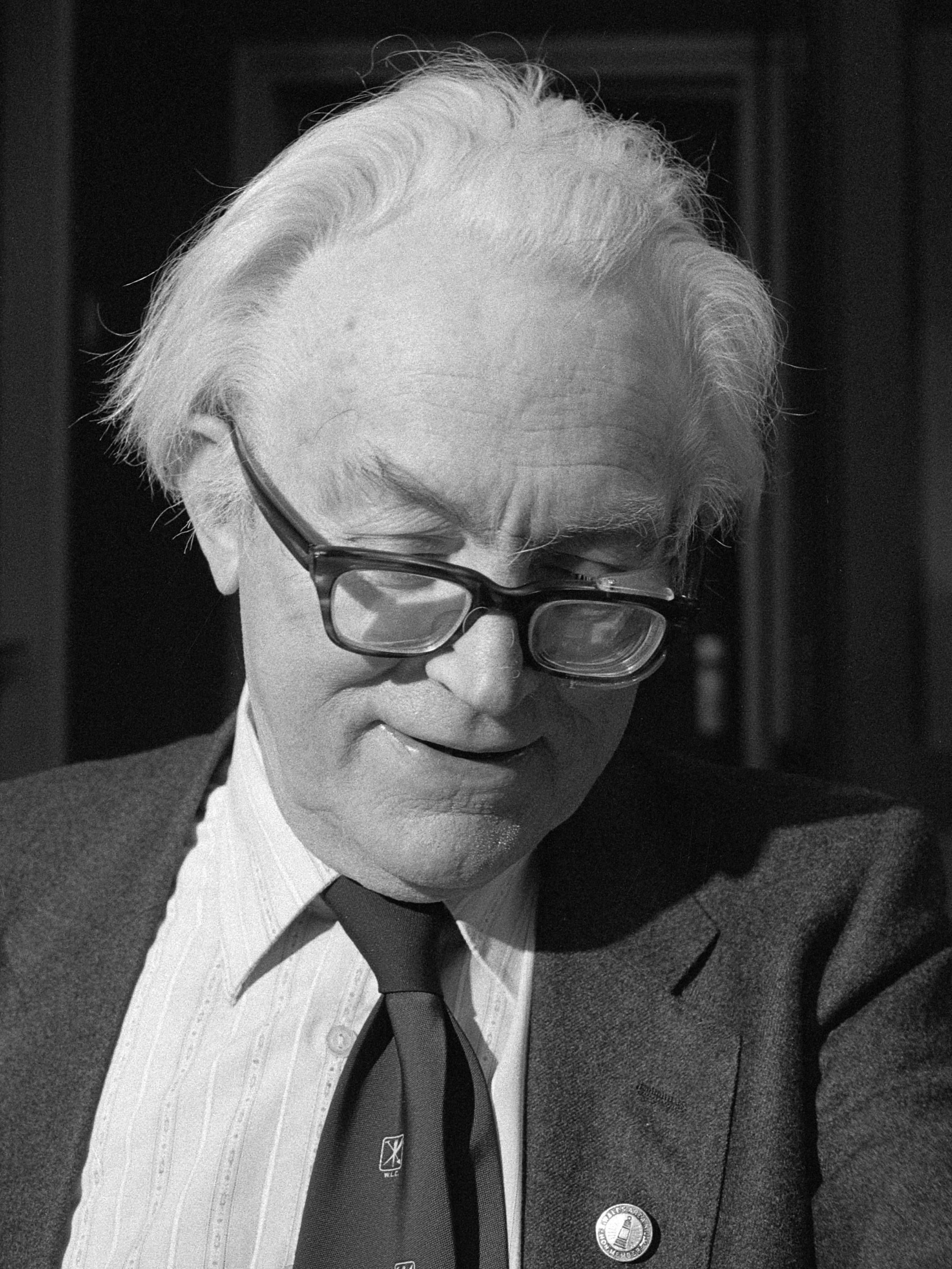

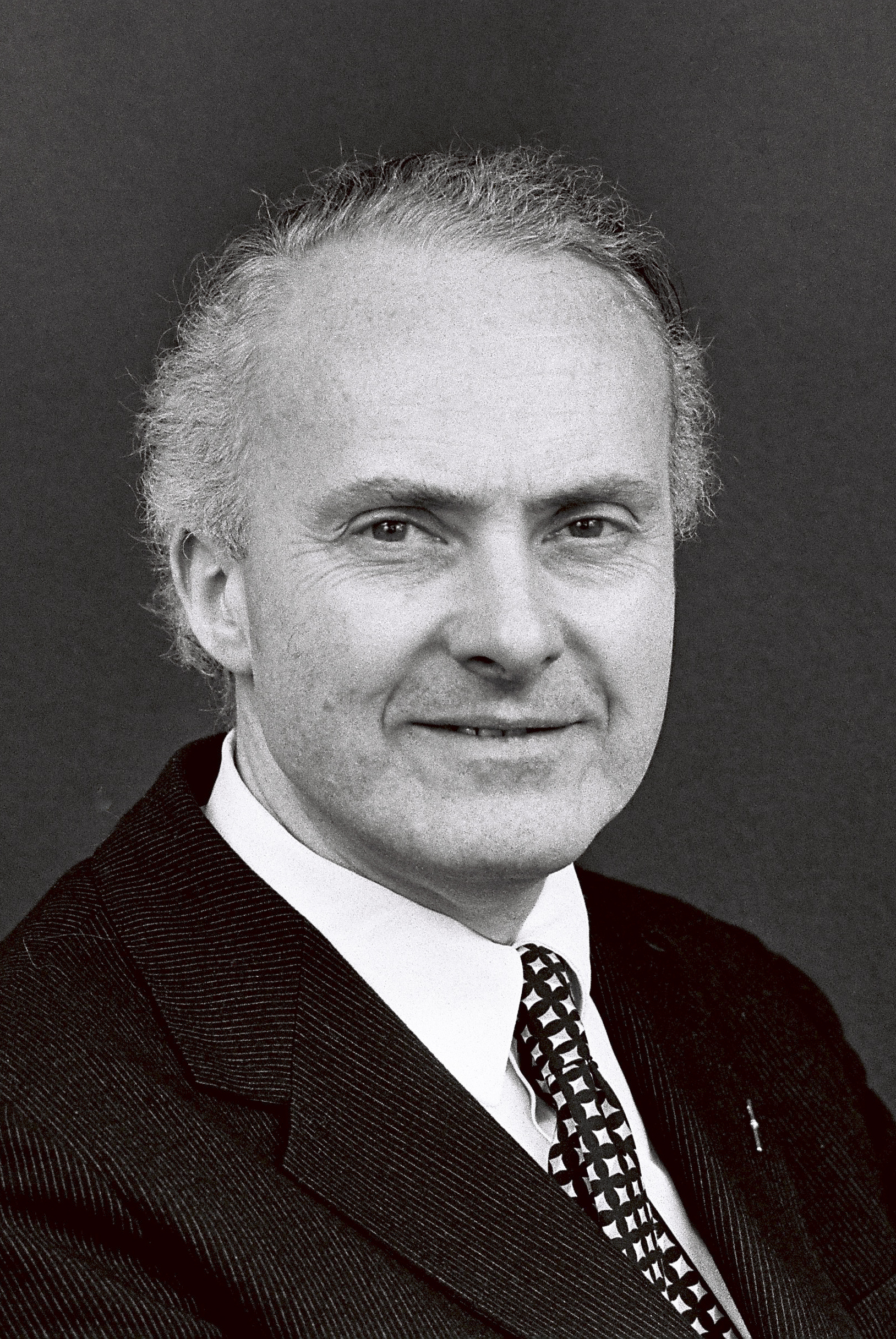
	First party	Second party
Candidate	Michael Foot	Brandon Rhys-Williams
Party	Labour	Conservative
Popular vote	20,528	3,799
Percentage	68.7%	12.7%
Swing	▼12.3%	▼6.3%
	Third party	Fourth party
	Lib	PC
Candidate	Patrick H. Lort-Phillips	Emrys Roberts
Party	Liberal	Plaid Cymru
Popular vote	3,449	2,091
Percentage	11.7%	7.0%
Swing	N/A	N/A
MP before election
Aneurin Bevan
Labour
Elected MP
Michael Foot
Labour

The 1960 Ebbw Vale by-election on 17 November 1960 was a by-election for a single seat in the House of Commons of the United Kingdom. Caused by the death of Labour Party Deputy Leader Aneurin Bevan, the constituency was very safely held by Labour and never in significant danger of changing hands. The selection of Michael Foot, a prominent left-winger out of sympathy with the party leadership on nuclear disarmament and other issues, led to a lively campaign. Foot's handy win was seen as causing problems for party leader Hugh Gaitskell.

== Background ==
Aneurin Bevan had represented Ebbw Vale since the 1929 general election, and had been a very high-profile politician almost throughout. His health was poor in the late 1950s; Bevan had a major abdominal operation in December 1959. Unknown to the general public was that the reason for his operation was that Bevan had been diagnosed with cancer. It was hoped that Bevan would be able to recover, and at the end of March 1960 Bevan told the press he intended to have a prolonged holiday but then resume active politics. Bevan's cancer proved terminal; on 2 July he was reported as critically ill, and he died "peacefully in his sleep" on 6 July.

At the 1959 general election, the result in Ebbw Vale had been:

1959 general election
Party	Candidate	Votes	%	±%
Labour	Aneurin Bevan	27,326	81.0	+1.7
Conservative	Arthur Gwynne Davies	6,404	19.0	−1.7
Majority		20,922	62.0	+3.4
Turnout		33,730	85.8	+2.1
Registered electors		39,299		
Labour hold		Swing	+1.7	

== Candidate selection ==
=== Labour ===
With such a large Labour majority, there was a great deal of attention on the selection of a Labour candidate for the by-election. The procedure did not begin until the end of the summer but on 24 August it was reported that two nominations had been received by the Constituency Labour Party. They were from Ron Evans (a steelworker, Bevan's former agent and a Monmouthshire County Councillor), and from Gordon Parry, a schoolteacher and Pembrokeshire County Councillor. On 29 August the branch of the Iron and Steel Trades Confederation at Richard Thomas and Baldwins steelworks nominated Michael Foot, who had been a prominent left-wing Labour MP for Plymouth Devonport from 1945 to 1955 and the influential editor of unofficial Labour journal Tribune since losing his seat. Foot had been one of Bevan's close friends and strongest supporters; for Foot, it was a cause of pride that he could follow Bevan. Foot also had a following among the local party members.

Foot's main rival for the nomination was Alderman Frank Whatley, who was nominated by the local branch of the National Union of Mineworkers on 29 August. Three further nominees were identified the following day: Dengar Evans (a 49-year-old chemist from Trethomas), Thomas Williams (barrister and former member of parliament for Hammersmith South and Barons Court) and George Viner (a journalist from Cardiff). Dr Kamalakant G. Pendse, president of the Socialist Medical Association for South Wales, was the ninth candidate to be nominated, and two more had appeared by the time nominations closed on 5 September: Glyn Lewis, a steelworkers' union official, and Denis Howell, former MP for Birmingham All Saints.

A shortlist of five was agreed by the executive committee of Ebbw Vale Divisional Labour Party on 8 September: Fred Evans (a headmaster and President of Caerphilly Labour Party), Ron Evans, Gordon Parry, Dr K. G. Pendse, and Thomas Williams. The absence of both Michael Foot and Frank Whatley caused an uproar both among Foot's supporters and the miners who were supporting Whatley, and their supporters checked the rule books to see how the shortlist could be changed. At a meeting of the General Management Committee of the local party on 17 September, there was a motion of no confidence in the Executive; the party chairman Ivor Parton suggested a simpler way out which was to add both Foot and Whatley to the shortlist as proposed. His suggestion was accepted unanimously. The selection contest followed on 25 September; Foot lead clearly from the first ballot:

Ebbw Vale candidate selection: 25 September 1960
Candidate	First round
Michael Foot	67
Ron Evans	27
Frank Whatley	23
Gordon Parry	22
Three others	17
Second Ballot required	

Thomas Williams, Fred Evans and Dr Pendse were eliminated. On the second ballot Whatley was bottom and was eliminated; the miners, without their own candidate, did not unite around any single one of the remaining candidates. On the third ballot the result was:

Ebbw Vale candidate selection: 25 September 1960
Candidate	Third round
Michael Foot	85
Gordon Parry	41
Ron Evans	29
Foot selected	

The announcement of Foot's selection victory was greeted by the singing of "The Red Flag". Immediately after the result, Ron Evans congratulated Foot on his victory and offered to act as Foot's agent just as he had for Bevan; the offer was accepted. Foot's biographer notes that Evans remained Foot's strongest supporter in the constituency until his death.

=== Conservatives ===
The Conservative Party confirmed very early on that it would definitely field a candidate. Five names were submitted to the Ebbw Vale Conservative Association for interview in the first week of September: Anthony Arnold (aged 31) had fought two previous Parliamentary elections and worked in the insurance industry; Humphrey Crum Ewing (aged 36) was a company secretary who had fought Swansea East in 1959; Paul Dean (aged 36) was head of the home affairs section of the Conservative Research Department; Ronald Maddocks (aged 50) was a barrister based in Swansea; and Sir Brandon Rhys-Williams (aged 33) worked for I.C.I. as a commercial assistant. On 12 September, the executive committee of Ebbw Vale Conservative Association decided to submit Rhys-Williams to the membership for adoption as their candidate.

=== Liberals ===
It was initially thought unlikely that a Liberal candidate would stand in the byelection; the last time the Liberals had fought the seat was in 1929. At the end of August the Welsh Liberal Party decided to send an organiser to the constituency for a month to see if the party could win support. At the same time a willing potential candidate appeared: Lieutenant-Colonel Patrick Lort-Phillips, (aged 49) who was a farmer, author and journalist and had twice previously campaigned in Gloucester. Although the national headquarters of the Liberal Party was still unsure, Lort-Phillips was eventually adopted on 10 October. At the 1960 Liberal Assembly held at the end of September, he caused a stir by moving an amendment calling for unilateral nuclear disarmament which was defeated by 607 votes to 78.

=== Plaid Cymru and others ===
The Welsh nationalist party Plaid Cymru made it clear that it would stand in the byelection, and on 7 September the Ebbw Vale area committee of the party chose Emrys Roberts (aged 28) as their candidate. Roberts had fought two previous elections in Newport and Cardiff North, and was organising secretary of the party. No other candidate appeared by the time nominations closed on 7 November.

== Campaign ==
The party conference season intervened between candidate selection and the opening of the campaign; Michael Foot made a strong speech at the 1960 Labour Party conference supporting unilateral nuclear disarmament. Conference passed a unilateralist motion against the strong views of party leader Hugh Gaitskell. Foot was anxious to stress that he would not raise Gaitskell's leadership during the byelection campaign, pledging not to answer questions about it if he was asked, but he would campaign on the issue of nuclear arms. On 26 October, the Labour chief whip Herbert Bowden formally started the byelection by moving that a writ for electing a new member be issued. Nominations were to close on 7 November and polling day would be 17 November.

=== Unilateralism intrudes ===
Foot opened his campaign on 30 October with an attack on "the complacency, the corruption and the poltroonery of the Tory Government". He pointed to the two largest employers of the constituency, coal-mining and steel production, and asserted that the Conservatives were hacking away at both. The other parties attempted to make political capital out of the differences between Foot and the Labour leadership. Lort-Phillips claimed Gaitskell had "signed his political death warrant" by opting to fight against the conference decision to support unilateralism, and that an effective opposition was needed. There was speculation that Foot might lose 10,000 votes because of his stance on unilateralism, although The Times correspondent could not detect any sign of crisis among the electorate. Foot and his wife were also concerned that anger over the incompetence of Ebbw Vale council, run by Labour, would lead to abstentions.

At a public meeting, one of the Labour canvassers asked Foot how to deal with those who disagreed with his stance on nuclear weapons, given Bevan's opposition to a unilateralist motion in 1957. Foot invited constituents to discuss the matter with him personally, and pointed out that the British government had abandoned attempts to produce its own delivery system for nuclear warheads. Rhys Williams concentrated his campaign on talking to voters individually in pubs and clubs, where he claimed to receive a friendly welcome. He invited Joan Vickers, who had defeated Foot in Plymouth in 1955, to speak for him. Lort-Phillips, who claimed to have "a secret league of potential Liberals" at Richard Thomas & Baldwins, invited his party leader Jo Grimond to speak for him; Grimond did not accept. His attitude was thought to be influenced by Lort-Phillips' stance on nuclear arms although late in the campaign he sent a very general letter of support.

=== Personal attacks ===
After some speculation over what the contents of such a message would be, Hugh Gaitskell sent his letter of support to Foot on 11 November. It wished Foot "all good luck", frankly accepting that they were not in agreement on defence and foreign policy, but asserting that any differences were "confined to a narrow field". Gaitskell highlighted government proposals to sell its share in Richard Thomas & Baldwins, and the Rent Act 1957 as policies which the Labour Party would oppose. Foot's camp believed that, nevertheless, Gaitskell would have been pleased to see Foot obtain a poor result at the polls. During the last week, Foot attacked Rhys Williams for "imbecility" in suggesting that the west had been 'at war' with Soviet Union since 1945.

The tone degenerated further when Rhys Williams contrasted Bevan and Foot to Foot's disfavour as he "comes before the Welsh public with an uncongenial armoury of hatred and malicious propaganda". Foot replied denouncing Rhys Williams' "patronising snobbery and pin-headed intellectual capacity". In the late campaign, Rhys Williams frequently reminded voters that the electoral system was absolutely secret. Labour reported that its canvass returns indicated that Foot would get 75% of the vote and a 15,000 majority.

=== Plaid campaign ===
Plaid Cymru entered the campaign with optimism, with Roberts declaring that it was "our great opportunity". He brought across an Irish economist, Tomás MacGabhann, who explained how small independent countries could be prosperous. His campaign was said to be the only one suffused with humour, as when he declared "If you think Wales is not a nation you must be Hitler's uncle"; he was reliably predicted to be bottom of the poll.

A heavy downpour of rain on the days before the poll gave bad omens to Foot's wife Jill Craigie who blamed the rain for her husband's loss of Devonport in 1955. The votes were counted and the result declared on the day after the poll.

== Result ==
1960 Ebbw Vale by-election
Party	Candidate	Votes	%	±%
Labour	Michael Foot	20,528	68.8	−12.2
Conservative	Sir Brandon Rhys-Williams, Bt.	3,799	12.7	−6.3
Liberal	Patrick Herbert Lort-Phillips	3,449	11.5	N/A
Plaid Cymru	Emrys Roberts	2,091	7.0	N/A
Majority		16,729	56.0	−6.0
Turnout		29,867	76.1	−9.7
Registered electors		39,234		
Labour hold		Swing	-3.0	

Foot hailed his win as being the product of a campaign "fought... on a clear policy of socialism and a demand for a new foreign policy which repudiates nuclear strategy altogether". That the result was seen as a good one for Foot and a problem for Gaitskell was shown by a cartoon by 'Vicky' which depicted Gaitskell reading the result and saying "Oh dear, we've won". Foot retained the seat, which was renamed Blaenau Gwent in 1983, until he retired from Parliament in 1992.
