= Gordon Parry, Baron Parry =

Welsh politician (1925–2004)

The Right Honourable The Lord Parry

Member of the House of Lords
- Lord Temporal
- Life peerage 21 January 1976 – 1 September 2004

Personal details
- Born: 30 November 1925
- Died: 1 September 2004 (aged 78)

Gordon Samuel David Parry, Baron Parry DL (30 November 1925 – 1 September 2004), usually Lord Parry, was a Welsh politician. A member of the Labour Party, he was created a life peer as Baron Parry, of Neyland in the County of Dyfed on 21 January 1976 by Prime Minister Harold Wilson.

== Early life ==
The son of Reverend Thomas Lewis Parry and his wife, Anne Parry, Lord Parry's early childhood days were mostly spent around his father's church, Molleston Baptist Church in Pembrokeshire. His university education was at Trinity College, Carmarthen.

== Career ==
Lord Parry was a schoolteacher prior to going into politics, standing as a Labour Party candidate in the Pembrokeshire constituency. but before then, as a young teen, he was a regular at Bethesda Baptist Chapel, Neyland, where his father was then pastor, and where today young Parry's name is preserved in the form of graffiti scratched into one of the pews.

== Political career ==
Parry stood for election to Parliament on several occasions without success. He fought Monmouth in 1959, being defeated by the Conservative incumbent Peter Thorneycroft. He was beaten to the Labour nomination for the 1960 Ebbw Vale by-election by Michael Foot, and he contested three very close elections at Pembrokeshire in 1970, February and October 1974, each time coming within 1,500 votes of winning.

== Legacy ==
Lord Parry was active in travel and public works until the end of his life. His efforts reached around the world and today he is still fondly remembered in such far away locals as Macon, Georgia, United States, where he was important in the early years and ultimately for the success of the Macon International Cherry Blossom Festival.

Lord Parry teaches one of his Godsons to play chess

Among numerous other accolades, Lord Parry was presented with The Welsh American Heritage Medallion by the National Welsh American Foundation during formal ceremonies in September 2001 in Philadelphia, USA.

BBC News presenter Jamie Owen provided a tribute to him at his funeral at Bethesda Baptist Chapel. His funeral procession took place in Neyland and for the event the town was closed to traffic. The procession was led by a full contingent of Welsh Guards, the streets were lined with silent well-wishers, and the Royal Air Force paid homage by a missing-man flyover at the cemetery.

He was predeceased by his wife, Glenys, Lady Parry, and was survived by his daughter, The Hon. Cathy Parry Sherry.
