= Brandon Rhys-Williams =

British politician (1927–1988)

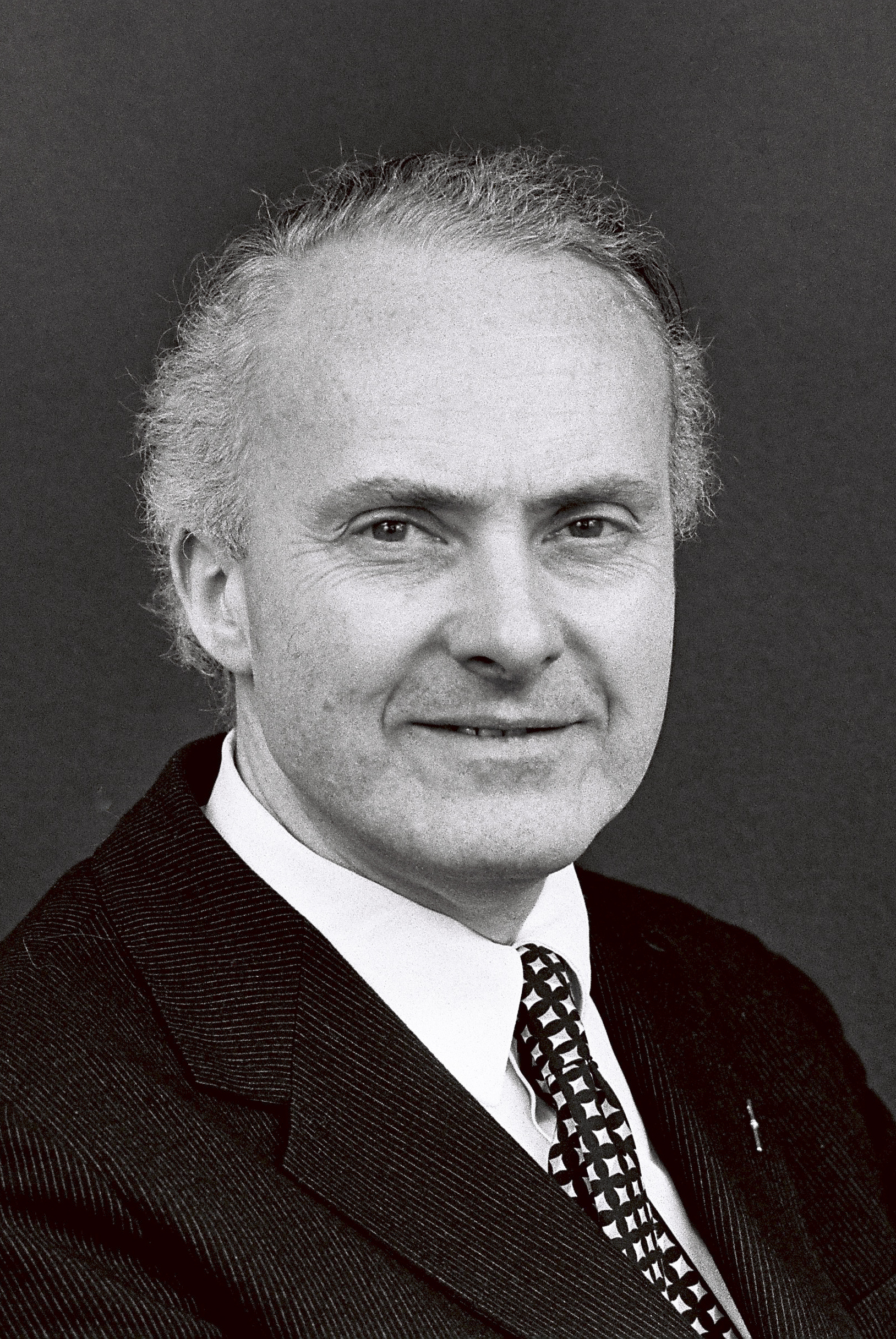
European Parliament portrait

Sir Brandon Meredith Rhys-Williams, 2nd Baronet (born Brandon Meredith Rhys Williams; 14 November 1927 – 18 May 1988) was a British Conservative politician who was the Member of Parliament (MP) for Kensington South from 1968 to 1974, and for Kensington from 1974 until his death.

== Background ==
Brandon Meredith Rhys Williams was born in 1927. His father, Sir Rhys Rhys-Williams, had been a Liberal MP. His mother, Juliet Rhys-Williams, was another Liberal politician who later joined the Conservative Party and became a member of the Conservative Monday Club. He took the surname Rhys-Williams in 1938. He was educated at Eton College and Bolton Technical College. From 1946 to 1948, he was in the Welsh Guards.

After his father's death, Brandon Rhys-Williams inherited his estate at Miskin.

== Parliamentary career ==
Rhys-Williams contested Pontypridd in 1959, and Ebbw Vale in the 1960 by-election following the death of Aneurin Bevan as well as the same constituency in the following general election. He was defeated each time in these safe Labour seats.

He was elected a Member of Parliament (MP) in the 1968 Kensington South by-election, representing that seat until February 1974, then for Kensington from February 1974 until his death. He was also a Member of the European Parliament from 1973 until 1984.

== Personal life and death ==
Rhys-Williams and his wife, the former Caroline Foster, had one son and two daughters. He lived in London and Groes-faen.

On 18 May 1988, Rhys-Williams died from pneumonia, as a complication of leukaemia, at Westminster Hospital, aged 60. In the subsequent by-election for Kensington, the seat was held for the Conservatives by Dudley Fishburn. Rhys-Williams was buried at St David's Church in Groes-faen.

== Archives ==
- Catalogue of the Rhys-Williams papers held at LSE Archives

Parliament of the United Kingdom
Preceded by William Lloyd Roots	Member of Parliament for Kensington South; 1968 – Feb 1974	Constituency abolished
New constituency	Member of Parliament for Kensington; Feb 1974 – 1988	Succeeded by Dudley Fishburn
Baronetage of the United Kingdom
Preceded by Rhys Rhys-Williams	Baronet (of Miskin); 1955–1988	Succeeded by (Arthur) Gareth Rhys-Williams
