= William Roots =

British Conservative politician

William Lloyd Roots (10 September 1911 – 14 August 1971) was a British Conservative politician. He was elected as Member of Parliament (MP) for Kensington South at the 1959 general election, and served until his resignation in 1968.

Parliament of the United Kingdom
Preceded by Sir Patrick Spens	Member of Parliament for Kensington South; 1959–1968	Succeeded by Brandon Rhys-Williams
