= Capital Safety =

- Type: Private
- Industry: Manufacturing
- Founded: 1998
- Founder: Electra Private Equity
- Headquarters: Bloomington, Minnesota, United States
- Key people: Stephen G. Oswald (Former CEO); Kevin Coplan (President); Pat Velasco (Chairman of the Board)
- Products: DBI-Sala, Protecta
- Revenue: ▲US$350 million
- Number of employees: 1200
- Website: capitalsafety.com

Capital Safety is a manufacturer of fall protection, confined space, and rescue equipment serving the oil and gas, construction, utilities, wind energy, transportation, telecommunications, mining, and general industrial sectors. The company's fall protection products are sold worldwide. In addition to manufacturing, Capital Safety provides in-house and on-site fall protection and rescue training services. The company partners with insurance providers to offer safety training programmes ranging from four hours to five days in duration.

Capital Safety is headquartered in Bloomington, Minnesota, United States. It operates offices and facilities in China, Colombia, Brazil, Mexico, Dubai, Singapore, Australia, New Zealand, Canada, France, the United Kingdom, and Slovakia.

== History ==
In 2006, Capital Safety acquired Unique Concepts Ltd., a confined space safety equipment brand. In 2007, Arle Capital acquired Capital Safety.

In 2010, Capital Safety acquired TAG Safety Ltd. (United Kingdom) and the Technical Institute of Training in Height (ITFH) in France. In March 2011, the company acquired Uniline Safety Systems. In January 2011, Capital Safety formed a Global Wind Energy team composed of wind-energy professionals from the United States, Canada, Europe, Asia, and Australia.

In June 2011, Capital Safety opened a wind turbine training structure in Red Wing, Minnesota. The company also operates a wind turbine training structure in Greenfield, United Kingdom, near Manchester. In July 2011, Capital Safety acquired Arseg, a Latin America–based personal protective equipment company.

In January 2012, KKR & Co. acquired Capital Safety for $1.1 billion. Stephen Oswald became chief executive officer in March 2012. On June 23, 2015, 3M announced an agreement to acquire Capital Safety for $1.8 billion.

Following the acquisition, Capital Safety's brands, including DBI-SALA and Protecta, were integrated into 3M Fall Protection.

== Locations ==
Capital Safety is headquartered in the Minneapolis–Saint Paul metropolitan area in Minnesota, with primary manufacturing and training facilities located in Red Wing, Minnesota. The company operates manufacturing, distribution, and training facilities worldwide.

In the United States, Capital Safety operates distribution centres in Minnesota, southern California, Texas, and Connecticut. A wind turbine training structure, opened in June 2011, is located in Red Wing, Minnesota.

The company also operates a 7,000 square-foot training facility in Houston, Texas, offering courses for competent persons, authorised persons, qualified persons, programme administrators, rescue operations, tower climbers, and confined space safety. Capital Safety maintains an international training centre in Saddleworth, near Manchester, featuring telecommunications towers, masts, and confined space rescue areas.
