= Emrys Roberts (Plaid Cymru politician) =

Welsh nationalist political activist (1931–2025)

Emrys Pugh Roberts (30 November 1931 – 9 January 2025) was a Welsh nationalist political activist.

== Life and career ==
Roberts was born in Royal Leamington Spa, Warwickshire, where his father, WH Roberts, originally of Blaenau Ffestiniog, kept a greengrocers shop. The family moved to Cardiff during WWII and Roberts attended Minny Street Chapel where he absorbed Welsh culture and learned to speak Welsh.

Roberts studied at Cathays High School in Cardiff and then joined the civil service. He was a conscientious objector to National Service and was sentenced to three months in HMP Cardiff in 1952.

Roberts read Welsh and History at University of Wales College Cardiff where he was elected President of the Students Union 1954–1955. He also served as a Governor of UWCC 1976–79.

Roberts joined Plaid Cymru in his youth and stood for the party in numerous parliamentary elections, without ever being elected: the 1956 Newport by-election, Cardiff North at the 1959 general election, the 1960 Ebbw Vale by-election, then Cardiff North again in 1964. He was also active in the Campaign for Nuclear Disarmament, serving as the first secretary of its Welsh national council.

Roberts served as Organising Secretary for Plaid from 1957, with the initial brief of organising the campaign against the flooding of Capel Celyn (Tryweryn). In 1960 he became the Plaid General Secretary, serving for four years.

In 1964 Roberts accepted the offer to organise the Teesside International Eisteddfod which was held in 1966. He returned to Wales as he was offered the post of Public Relations Officer for Welsh National Opera but the funding did not materialise so he worked as a freelance journalist and editor of Caerphilly Advertiser until his appointment as the first Public Relations Officer for the Welsh Hospital Board in 1968. He quit this in 1972 when he was asked to stand as the Plaid Cymru party candidate in the Merthyr Tydfil by-election. He took a strong second place with 37% of the vote, providing hope for the party that they would gain seats in the next general election. He stood again in Merthyr Tydfil in the February and October 1974 general elections, gradually losing vote share. However, he was elected to Merthyr Borough Council 1975–1981 where he led the group of Plaid councillors. Under the leadership of Roberts, in 1976, Plaid took control of the council, the first authority it had ever run. They retained control until 1979.

In 1979, Roberts was elected as Vice President of Plaid, serving until 1981.

Roberts was appointed Chief Officer of South Gwent Community Health Council 1974–1993 and was Honorary Secretary of the Association of Welsh CHCs 1988–92. He was appointed the NHS District Health Manager for Torfaen 1993 where he served until his retirement in 1996. After his retirement he served two terms on the Council of Tribunals.

Roberts was actively involved with the Newport National Eisteddfod 1988 (Chair of Publicity Committee) and Press Officer for the 1997 Urdd National Eisteddfod held in Islwyn.

After retirement Roberts became more active in Rhymni Valley MIND, serving as Treasurer for many years, and was a founder member of Caerphilly FORUS user involvement forum.

After moving back to Cardiff in 1997 Roberts was for many years the Treasurer of the South Wales branch of Cymru-Cuba and involved in raising money to send medical and educational supplies to Cuba in defiance of the US embargo.

Roberts was a humanist and communitarian and believed democracy could only be effective when decision making power remained within communities because large, remote governments are not accountable to the electorate and disenfranchise minorities. After careful reading of the Treaty of Lisbon Roberts supported Brexit in 2016 and subsequently wrote regular letters to the Western Mail in support of leaving the European Union.

Roberts's own account of his career, "A Bee or Two in My Bonnet" (2011), was published online by Plaid Cymru History Society. Roberts's overview of Welsh history, "Ein Stori Ni", was published by Lolfa in 2017 and later in translation entitled "Highlights from Welsh History".

Roberts died on 9 January 2025, at the age of 93.

Party political offices
Preceded by John Edward Jones	General Secretary of Plaid Cymru; 1962–1964	Succeeded by Elwyn Roberts
